= Hazel Sampson =

American linguist (1910–2014)

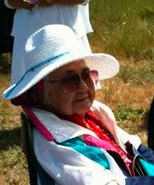
- Sampson in 2011
- Born: Hazel Hall; May 26, 1910; Jamestown, Washington, U.S.
- Died: February 4, 2014 (aged 103); Port Angeles, Washington, U.S.
- Citizenship: United States (Jamestown S'Klallam Tribe of Washington)
- Known for: Last native speaker of the Klallam language
- Spouse: Edward C. Sampson
- Parent(s): William Hall, Ida Balch Hall
- Relatives: Grandfather, James Balch

Hazel M. Sampson (née Hall; May 26, 1910 – February 4, 2014) was an American Klallam elder and language preservationist. Sampson was the last native speaker of the Klallam language, as well as the oldest member of the Klallam communities at the time of her death in 2014. She was a member of the Jamestown S'Klallam Tribe of Washington.

The Klallam language is still spoken as a second language by some members of the four indigenous Klallam communities: the Jamestown S'Klallam Tribe, and the Lower Elwha Klallam Tribe of Washington's Olympic Peninsula, the Port Gamble Band of S’Klallam Indians of Washington's Kitsap Peninsula, as well as the Beecher Bay Klallam of British Columbia, Canada.

== Biography ==
Hazel Hall was born to William Hall and Ida Balch Hall on May 26, 1910, in Jamestown, Washington. She was the granddaughter of Chief James Balch, the founder of Jamestown and the namesake of both the town and the Jamestown S'Klallam Tribe of Washington. Her parents taught her the Klallam language as a native speaker, though she later learned English as a second language. Her father, William Hall, founded the first Indian Shaker Church on the Olympic Peninsula in Dungeness, Washington, circa 1910.

In 1934, Sampson and her husband, Edward C. Sampson Sr., moved from Jamestown to Port Angeles, Washington. There, the Sampsons became one of the thirteen founding families who purchased and owned land on the Lower Elwha Klallam Reservation. She was married to Edward Sampson for 75 years, until his death in 1995. She was also a member of the Jamestown S'Klallam Band, which was established as a separate Klallam political entity during the 1980s. According to Jamestown chairman Ron Allen, Sampson, "considered herself a S'Klallam first. She associated closely with all three bands" in Washington state.

Hazel Sampson was a key contributor in the work to preserve the Klallam language. Timothy Montler, a professor of linguistics at the University of North Texas, began working on Klallam language preservation beginning in 1990. Montler partnered with Jamie Valadez, a Klallam language teacher at Port Angeles High School and member of the Lower Elwha Klallam, compile Klallam language materials and teaching tools. The two began work to save Klallam from potential extinction.

Montler and Valdez collaborated closely with local native speaking Klallam, including Hazel and Ed Sampson, Adeline Smith and Bea Charles. In 1999, Montler published several guidebooks and lesson plans aimed at teaching Klallam language basics through storytelling. Montler also published the first Klallam dictionary in 2012 through the University of Washington Press. He used terms and definitions contributed by Hazel Sampson, Smith and Charles to compile the dictionary.

Hazel Sampson had declined to be named as an official member of Montler and Valadez's project, citing tradition. However, she collaborated closely with her husband and other members. The researchers believed she understood the Klallam language better than her husband and the other members of the project. According to Valadez, "She said, 'This is Ed's work.' She was very traditional." Adeline Smith died in March 2013, leaving Sampson as the last surviving, native speaker of the Klallam language.

Hazel Sampson resided in her Port Angeles home until her death on February 4, 2014, at the age of 103. Her death marked the passing of the last native speaker of Klallam, though some younger members continued to speak it as a second language. According to Klallam cultural teacher Jamie Valadez, "She was the last one...[Her death] changes the dynamics of everything...They carry so much knowledge of our culture and traditions." She was survived by five generations of descendants.
