= Adeline Smith =

American Klallam elder and lexicographer

- Born: March 15, 1918
- Died: March 19, 2013 (aged 95); Puyallup, Washington
- Resting place: Neah Bay Cemetery
- Education: Chemawa Indian School
- Occupations: Lexicographer, conservationist, teacher, welder, waitress, salal picker
- Employer(s): Boeing, Goodwill Industries
- Known for: Tribal elder, lexicographer, activist. One of the last two native speakers of the Klallam language.
- Spouses: Roosevelt Suppah, Roy Smith
- Children: Mark Suppah, Roy Smith Jr., Patricia Forbe

Adeline Smith (March 15, 1918 – March 19, 2013) (Lower Elwha Klallam Tribe) was an American elder, lexicographer, activist, and cultural preservationist. She was a member of one of four indigenous Klallam communities of the Pacific Northwest.

Smith was one of the last two native speakers of the Klallam language who spoke it as her first language. Smith led efforts to revive the Klallam language. Adeline Smith created the first Klallam alphabet with Timothy Montler, a professor of linguistics at the University of North Texas. Smith and Montler also developed the first Klallam dictionary, which was published in December 2012. She was the largest contributor, offering 12,000 words and phrases to the dictionary. Her revitalization work has enabled the Klallam language to be taught to public and private students from preschool through high school.

Smith also championed the preservation of Tse-whit-zen, a historic Lower Elwha village which is approximately 2,700 years old, rediscovered during a construction project on the waterfront in Port Angeles, and the restoration of the Elwha River. The removal of the Elwha dams, beginning in September 2011, drained Lake Aldwell reservoir, which had been created before she was born. The destruction of the dams and drainage of the lake uncovered the Klallam ceremonial creation site.

== Biography ==
=== Early life ===
Smith was born on March 15, 1918. She was raised on a family homestead on the Elwha River, just outside Port Angeles, Washington. Her family spoke only Klallam at home and Smith did not have an English language name until she first enrolled in public school when she was seven years old. Her great-grandparents passed down the family's unwritten, oral history with events from the late 18th century.

Smith was forced to leave Chemawa Indian School, a boarding school in Salem, Oregon, shortly before her graduation due to the death of her mother and needs of her family. At age 18 she moved to Seattle with her niece, Bea Charles, to find work, despite the widespread discrimination against Native Americans at the time. (Bea Charles, who died in 2009, later became a noted Klallam linguist).

Smith worked a series of jobs, finding employment as a waitress and an employee of Goodwill Industries. During World War II, Smith worked as a welder at a submarine factory in San Francisco and at a Boeing plant in Seattle.

=== Klallam linguistic preservation ===
Smith was working a job in Neah Bay, Washington, as a salal picker when she decided to move back permanently to the Lower Elwha Klallam reservation outside Port Angeles. She had worked outside the reservation for more than forty years by that time. Once she was back with the Lower Elwha, she began teaching Klallam history and culture.

In the 1990s, Smith began trying to revive the Klallam language, which had fallen into disuse. She co-created the first Klallam alphabet with Timothy Montler, a professor of linguistics at the University of North Texas. She worked with Montler throughout the 1990s, 2000s, and early 2010s to create the first Klallam-language dictionary. Smith contributed 12,000 words to the dictionary, making her the largest single contributor to the new lexicon. To research entries for the dictionary, Smith transcribed Khallam language recordings, which were made by the late ethnologist John Peabody Harrington in Khallam communities in 1942. The transcriptions took her months to complete.

The Klallam Dictionary, a 983-page book, was published by the University of Washington Press in December 2012. It is one of the largest books ever published by the UW Press. The dictionary was unveiled at a celebration ceremony held at the Port Gamble S'Klallam longhouse on November 28, 2012. The ceremony was attended by members of the Lower Elwha, Jamestown S'Klallam, and Port Gamble Klallam communities. Members of the three tribal governments held up portraits of Smith, who could not attend, to honor her contributions to the dictionary. Smith held her first copy of the dictionary in January 2013. Copies of the dictionary were distributed to all Klallam tribal government offices and schools.

Smith trained new teachers in the Klallam language and culture. Since 2013, the Klallam language is taught in both private Klallam tribal and public schools in the Port Angeles area due to her efforts. Classes are taught from the elementary to high school levels.

Smith was the subject of a documentary, The Life of a Klallam Girl Growing up on the Elwha River.

Smith continued to create written accounts of the Klallam's oral history and stories until shortly before her death in 2013.

=== Elwha River restoration ===
Adeline Smith appeared in U.S. federal court in cases on behalf of her Lower Elwha Klallam Tribe. Her efforts are credited with helping to win the 1974 Boldt court decision, which upheld the rights of the Lower Elwha and other tribes under past treaties to half the catch of a salmon run.

In 1992, Smith lobbied the United States Congress in the run-up to a vote to tear down dams along the Elwha River. She lived to see the removal of the dams, including the Elwha Dam, from the river beginning in September 2011, and the return of the first salmon to the river. The removal of one of the dams in 2012 drained Lake Aldwell, a man-made reservoir created in 1913, revealing the Klallam ceremonial creation site in July 2012. It had been submerged since the reservoir was filled.

She is featured in the film "Unconquering the Last Frontier" by Robert Lundahl, narrated by actor, Gary Farmer, and seen on Public Television. In the film, Adeline recalls her early years growing up along the Elwha River, and relates stories about the devastation of the fisheries there, and the Lower Elwha Klallam Tribe's efforts to remove two industrial power dams and restore the river ecosystem.

=== Preservation of Tse-whit-zen ===
Smith championed the preservation of Tse-whit-zen, a historic Lower Elwha village located at the base of Ediz Hook, which dates back to approximately 2,700 years. The site is the largest ancient Native American village discovered in Washington state to date. As a child, Smith had been warned by adults never to walk on or play on the site of Tse-whit-zen, which is considered sacred by the Lower Elwha Klallam Tribe.

Smith campaigned against the construction of a drydock on the Port Angeles waterfront. It was intended to be used to build floating bridge pontoons for the Hood Canal Bridge replacement. The graving yard project, which was being constructed by the Washington state government, encountered the large village site of Tse-whit-zen, including its cemetery. More than three hundred bodies were exhumed and removed from the site before Washington Governor Gary Locke intervened and permanently halted the construction in December 2004.

The three hundred remains were reburied by the Lower Elwha. The state government turned over ownership of the area of Tse-whit-zen to the Lower Elwha Klallam.

=== Legacy ===
Adeline Smith died from heart failure in Puyallup, Washington, on March 19, 2013, just four days after her 95th birthday. She was buried in Neah Bay Cemetery. She was predeceased by her first husband Roosevelt Suppah, their son Mark Suppah; and by her second husband Roy Smith, and their children Roy Smith Jr., and Patricia Smith Forbe.

With Smith's death, Hazel Sampson, 103 years old in March 2013, was left as the last living native speaker of the Klallam language. Smith was the last Klallam native speaker to teach her language on Washington's Olympic Peninsula. Smith had planned to make audio recordings of additional Klallam stories in the Spring of 2013.

She left behind many grandchildren and great-grandchildren. (Brian Williams, Wendy Sampson, Zoie Craver, Briana Anderson, and many more.)
