= Kalaloch, Washington =

Unincorporated community in Washington, United States

- Unincorporated community
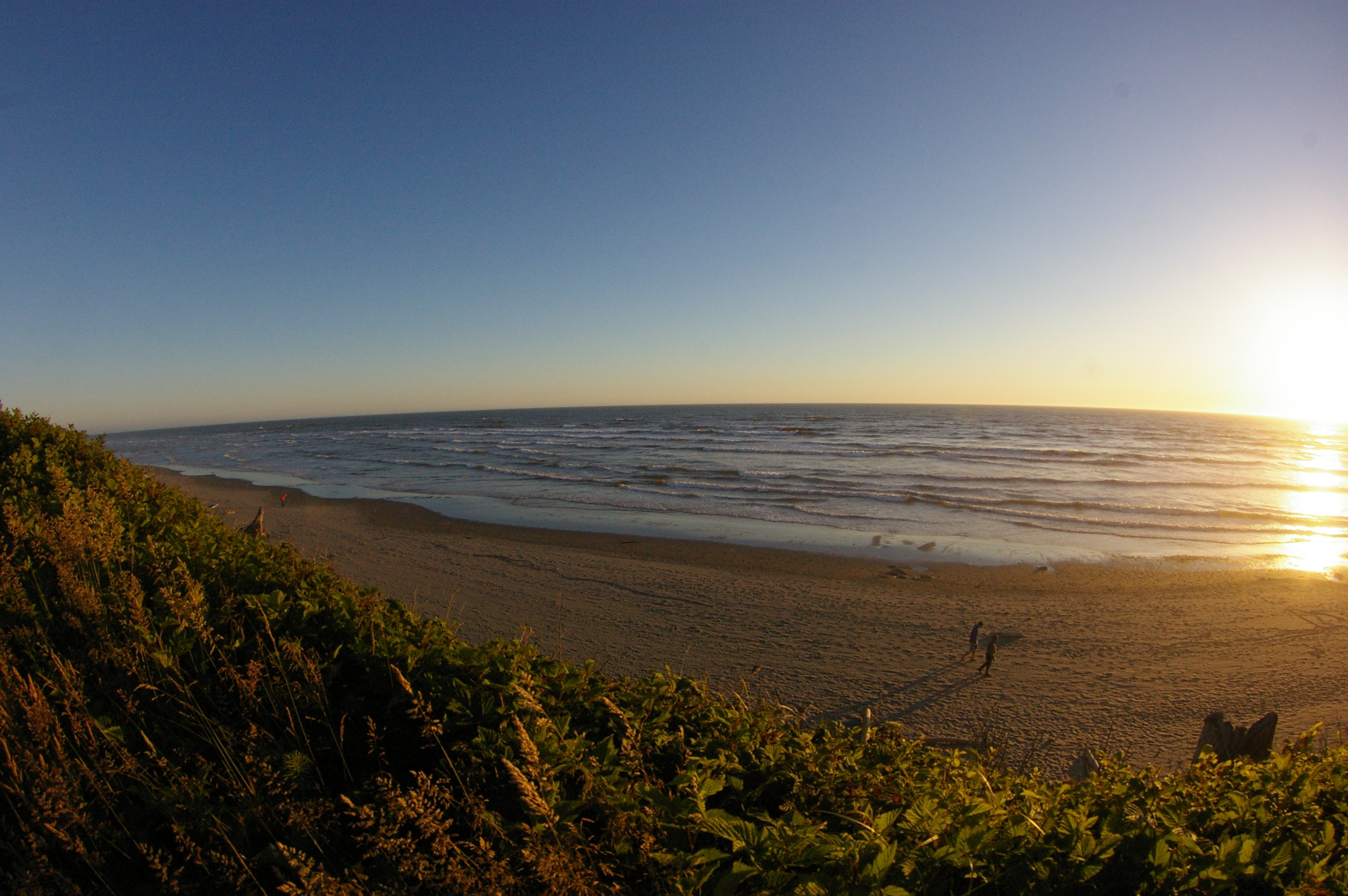
- Kalaloch Beach

- Location within Washington (state) Location within the United States
- Coordinates: 47°36′16″N 124°22′21″W
- Country: United States
- State: Washington
- County: Jefferson
- Elevation: 30 ft (9.1 m)
- Time zone: UTC-8 (Pacific (PST))
  - Summer (DST): UTC-7 (PDT)
- ZIP Code: 98331
- Area code(s): 360, 564
- GNIS feature ID: 1521546

Kalaloch /ˈkleɪlɒk/ is an unincorporated resort area entirely within Olympic National Park in western Jefferson County, Washington, United States. Kalaloch accommodations, which include a lodge, rental cabins, and campgrounds, are on a 50-foot (15 m) bluff overlooking the Pacific Ocean, west of U.S. Route 101 on the Olympic Peninsula, north of the reservation of the Quinault Indian Nation.

The name Kalaloch is a corruption of the Quinault term k'–E–le–ok, pronounced Kq–â-lā'–ȯk, meaning "a good place to land", "canoe launch and landing", or "sheltered landing". The site was one of the few safe landing sites for dugout canoes between the Quinault River and Hoh River.

== History ==
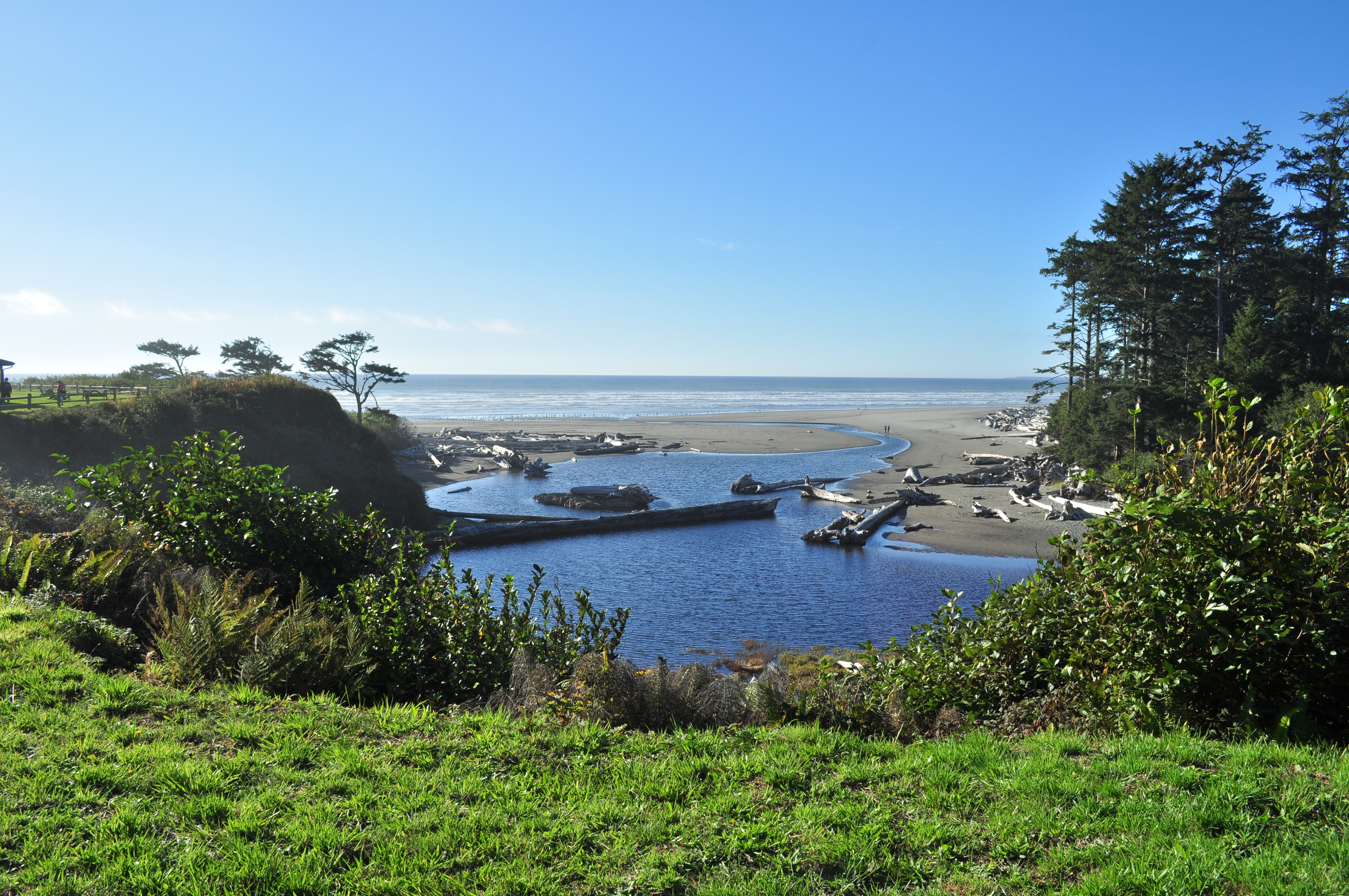
Kalaloch Creek

Artifacts discovered in Olympic National Park are evidence early humans inhabited the Olympic Peninsula 6,000 to 12,000 years ago. Today eight tribes (Elwha Klallam, Hoh, Jamestown S'Klallam, Makah, Port Gamble, Quileute, Quinault, and Skokomish) live in reservations along the shores. In 1855 and 1856 Olympic Peninsula tribes ceded their lands and waters to the federal government.

In 1889, Washington became a state. President Grover Cleveland created the Olympic Forest Reserve in 1897, which was renamed to Olympic National Forest in 1907. Charles W. Becker, Sr., purchased a 40-acre (16 ha) coastal plot just south of where Kalaloch Creek meets the Pacific Ocean in 1925. Becker used milled lumber from driftwood logs that washed up on the beach to build a main lodge and cabins.

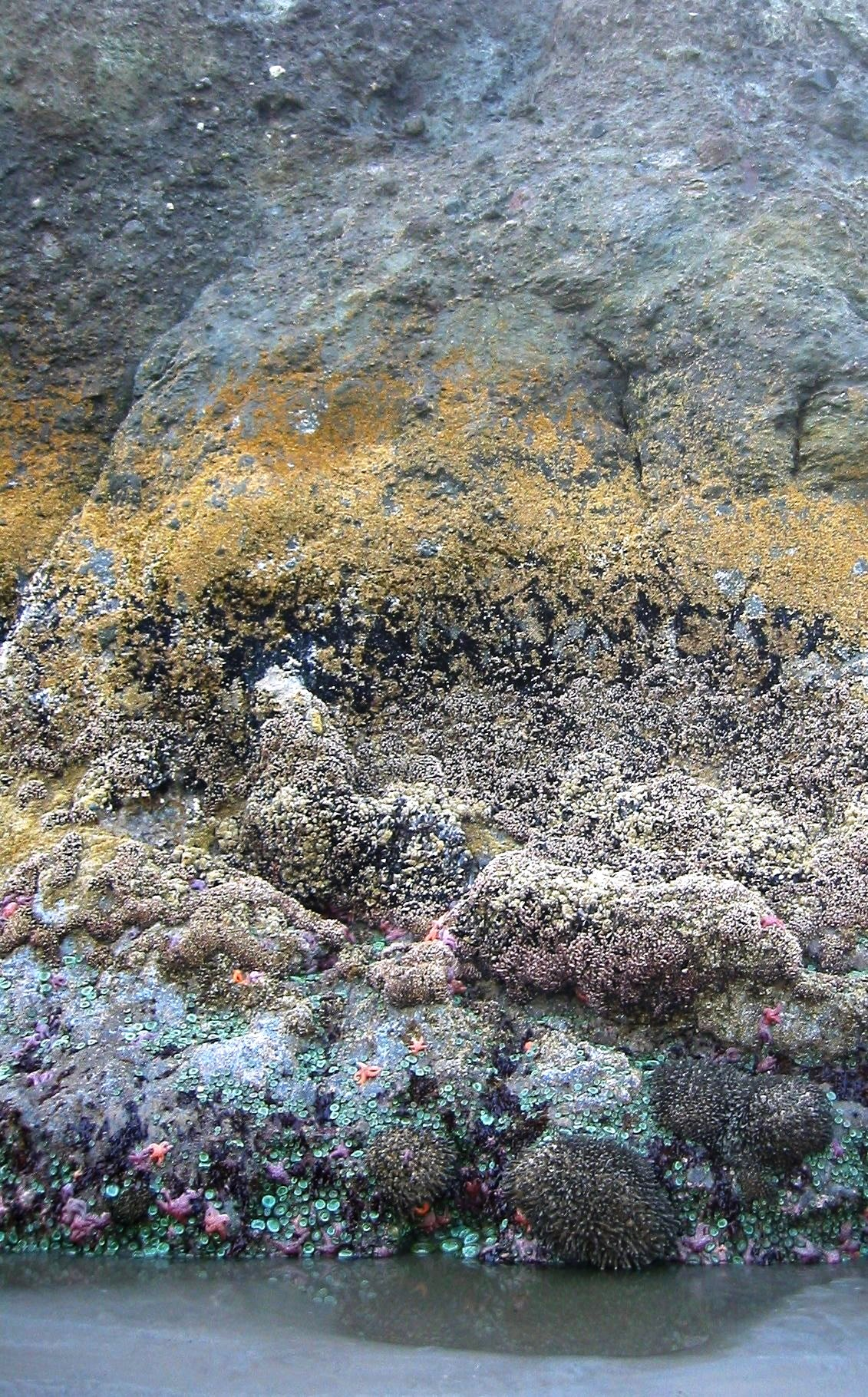
Intertidal zones at Kalaloch

To preserve some of Washington's primeval forest lands, in 1938, President Franklin D. Roosevelt designated 898,000 acres (363,000 ha) as Olympic National Park. Two years later, President Roosevelt added 300 square miles (780 km^{2}) to the park. President Harry S. Truman added 75 miles (121 km) of coastal wilderness to the park in 1953, including the Kalaloch area. In 1976 the Olympic National Park was designated as an International Biosphere Reserve. The National Park Service (NPS) purchased the Becker property in 1978 and renamed it Kalaloch Lodge. Olympic National Park was designated in 1981 as a World Heritage Site. In 1988, Congress approved the designation of 95 percent of the park as the Olympic Wilderness.

== Climate ==
Kalaloch weather is influenced by prevailing Pacific winds and two temperate rain forests, the Hoh Rainforest and the Quinault Rainforest. Annual rainfall at Kalaloch is measured in feet: on average, 8.5 feet (2.6 m) fall annually.

- Spring – 8.94 inches (227 mm) per month average
- Summer – 3.13 inches (80 mm) per month average
- Fall – 11.17 inches (284 mm) per month average
- Winter – 17.12 inches (435 mm) per month average

== Recreation ==
Bald eagle at Kalaloch

About 73 miles (117 km) of beach in the Olympic National Park provide beachcombing opportunities. At Kalaloch, seven area beach trails lead to coastal hikes and Kalaloch Creek. Fishing possibilities at Kalaloch include surf perch, salmon, or native trout, or at low tide visitors may dig for razor clams. Bald eagles, black-legged kittiwakes, red-throated loons, black scoters, and brown pelicans are among birdwatchers' sightings at Kalaloch. From Kalaloch bluffs, whale watchers may see migratory gray whales, and sea lions, harbor porpoise, harbor seals, sea otters and orcas may also be spotted.

The National Park Service staffs a ranger station in the area during the summer.

Kalaloch Beach is known for the location of the "Tree of Life", a Sitka spruce with exposed roots that spans over a small creek that drains onto the sand from cliffs above the beach. Normally a tall species, the Tree of Life is shorter and thicker, with bent and windswept branches. The tree is a landmark in the county and is a popular site for social media photographers. In early January 2025, the tree had noticeably slumped approximately 5 feet (1.5 m) after the creek gully eroded.

== Kalaloch Lodge and Campground ==
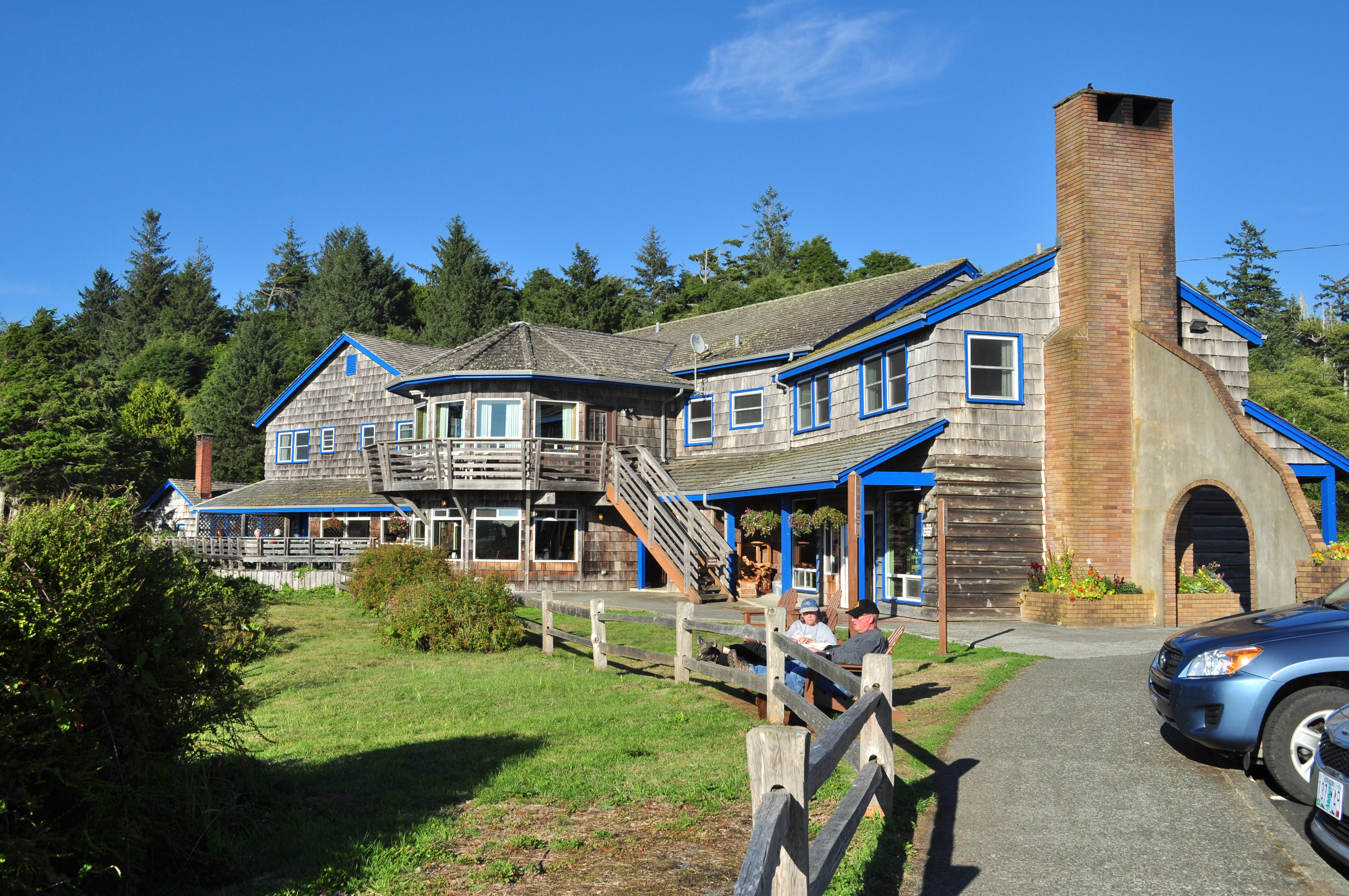
Kalaloch Lodge

Kalaloch Lodge offers three types of accommodations: lodge, cabins, and campground. At its peak, forty cabins were available, including six on the bluff overlooking the ocean. Due to approximately 13 feet (4.0 m) of erosion to the bluffs in 2023 and 2024, a total of seven cabins were demolished. The NPS stated that the lodge and remaining rental units were not considered threatened.

Kalaloch Campground, with 166 camp sites, is one of four campgrounds in Olympic National Park that accepts summer reservations.
