= Northwest Straits Foundation =

The Northwest Straits Foundation is the non-profit partner of the Northwest Straits Marine Conservation Initiative. It is based in Bellingham, Washington and was established to support the programs of the Marine Resources Committees (MRCs) in partnership with the Northwest Straits Commission. The Foundation's primary purpose is to attract funding for the work of the Northwest Straits Marine Conservation Initiative. The Foundation also heads the Derelict Gear Program. They also head the Shoreline Armoring Reduction Program (SHARP), restoring beaches in Puget Sound.
