= Port Angeles School District =

School district in Washington state

Port Angeles School District No. 121 is a public school district in Port Angeles, Washington, United States. It serves the city of Port Angeles and surrounding rural areas, and the nearby Lower Elwha Klallam Tribe. The district's operations are supported by Educational Service District 121. In November 2015, the district had a total enrollment of 3,985 students. The Port Angeles School District stretches from McDonald Creek in the east to Lake Crescent in the west, and from the northern coastline of the Straits of Juan de Fuca to the foothills of Olympic National Park in the south.

The district's collaborative relationship with the Lower Elwha Tribe has been celebrated since 1996 in an Annual Potlatch hosted by the tribe.

== Schools ==
The district operates five elementary schools, one middle school, a high school, an alternative high school and a vocational school.

=== Preschools ===
While there is no explicitly set preschool in port Angeles school district, the preschools available for students 3–5 years old(and potty trained) typically rotate once per year. Only one preschool is available per year.

=== Elementary schools ===
Each of the five elementary schools have enrollments of 300-400 students which serve kindergarten through the 6th grade. They have basic education, and various special programs in psychical and music categories, serving strings for 4-6 and band for 6th graders.

- Dry Creek Elementary School serves mostly rural students west of Port Angeles and from the Lower Elwha Klallam tribal reservation.
- Hamilton Elementary School serves students in west Port Angeles.
- Jefferson Elementary School serves students in central Port Angeles.
- Roosevelt Elementary School serves mostly rural students east of Port Angeles.
- Franklin Elementary School serves mostly students east of Port Angeles

=== Middle schools ===
- Stevens Middle School has an average enrollment of 600 students, has won state honors in science education and was named among the top 22 middle schools in the state in 2011 and 2012. It has a strong education focus, with various classes in music band, orchestra, economics, language classes, and vocational classes. It also has multiple sports programs and an intensified math sequence.

=== High schools ===
- Port Angeles High School. Port Angeles high school has various sports programs at the 2A state level, an award winning music program with bands and choirs, a large set of fine arts and vocational courses, as well as NROJTC military programs.

=== Alternative schools and programs ===
- Lincoln High School — alternative high school that serves approximately 50 students. Here students are given the opportunity, understanding, and encouragement needed to help each student become a successful person. Basic skills and other post-secondary education is the primary focus. Unlike port Angeles high school, no sports programs or music programs are available, and only the basic English, math, science, and other classes that are required for graduation are present. The credit requirements however, remain the same as port Angeles high school.
- Parents as Partners — homeschool program.
- Seaview Academy - Virtual school program. Serves students in all grades(with the exception of preschool level) K-12.

== Governance ==
The district is governed by a board of directors elected from the district at large. Each of the five directors is elected for a term of four years. Two are elected in one two-year election cycle and the other three in the alternate cycle.

The school board president is Steven Baxter.
