= Jeffrey Veregge =

S'Klallam artist (1974–2024)

- Born: March 13, 1974; Little Boston, Washington, US
- Died: April 12, 2024 (aged 50); Seattle, Washington, US
- Citizenship: Port Gamble S'Klallam Tribe and American
- Education: The Art Institute of Seattle
- Known for: Digital painting
- Style: "Salish Geek"; Formline art; Coast Salish art
- Website: jeffreyveregge.com

Jeffrey Veregge (March 13, 1974 – April 12, 2024) was a Native American (Port Gamble S'Klallam Tribe) artist. His work, which blended traditional Coast Salish aesthetics and pop culture references into what he called "Salish Geek" style, was featured in exhibitions at the George Gustav Heye Center, the IAIA Museum of Contemporary Native Arts, and the Center on Contemporary Art. Veregge was also known for his work in the comic book industry including variant covers for Marvel Comics.

== Life and career ==
=== Early life and education ===
Veregge was born in March 1974 in Kingston, Washington. His mother was a member of the Port Gamble S'Klallam Tribe and also had Suquamish and Duwamish heritage. His extended family contained several artists, including a great-grandmother who painted several covers for the magazine Liberty. He had four sisters. Veregge graduated from North Kitsap High School in 1992, later attending The Art Institute of Seattle. He graduated from The Art Institute with honors in 2000.

Veregge worked as a designer for a marketing agency in Poulsbo, Washington after graduating from The Art Institute of Seattle. He interned with Tsimshian artist David A. Boxley in 2001, where he learned how to draw formline art. After the internship, Veregge began working as a freelance artist, contributing work to Fast Company and Io9. He had his first exhibition in 2009 at the In The Spirit Art Festival in Tacoma, Washington.

=== Comics work ===
In 2012, his print of the DC Comics character Batman in style heavily inspired by traditional Coast Salish art won several awards at the In The Spirit Art Festival. Veregge described his intention with the piece as moving beyond efforts to be "the Native Picasso." He was subsequently recognized by IDW Publishing, Marvel Comics, and Valiant Comics, who commissioned him to create cover art. His first comic book cover was for an issue of Judge Dredd.

In 2015, Veregge worked on Marvel's relaunch of Red Wolf, a Native American superhero. The character, created by Roy Thomas and John Buscema in 1970, had only appeared in comics sporadically since his original appearance. Veregge described the project as a "chance for Natives and non-Natives to see a hero." Veregge also collaborated on several comic book projects with Taboo and B. Earl. In 2017, Veregge launched a creator-owned comic series named Demicon featuring a S'Klallam protagonist. It was published by Native Realities Press.

In 2020, Veregge led development of an issue of Marvel's Voices, titled Indigenous Voices #1, with a team of Indigenous artists and writers. The issue featured contributions from Veregge along with Rebecca Roanhorse, Darcie Little Badger, Stephen Graham Jones, and others. Following the issue's publication, Marvel published a series of eight variant covers featuring Veregge's interpretation of Marvel characters, including Thor, Spider-Man, and Captain America.

=== Other work ===
Veregge created a poster to commemorate the 35th anniversary of the 1980 eruption of Mount St. Helens. In 2016, Veregge donated a mural to Kingston High School in Washington. Also in 2016, his work was featured in an exhibit on cultural appropriation at Seattle's Center on Contemporary Art. In 2018, two 50-foot murals by Veregge, featuring Marvel superheroes battling aliens in New York City, were displayed at the Smithsonian's George Gustav Heye Center. The exhibit, titled "Of Gods and Heroes," ran for two years before closing in February 2020.

He ran a virtual exhibit at the Stonington Gallery in Seattle, titled "Bold Americans: Above and Beyond," in 2019. He ran a second virtual exhibit for the gallery, titled "A Better Tomorrow," in 2020. Also in 2020, Veregge was contracted to create a mural for the Climate Pledge Arena. The mural, titled "Legacy," features evergreen trees and Salish iconography. Veregge's art was featured in an exhibit at the Institute of American Indian Arts later in the year.

Two of Veregge's paintings, inspired by the Apollo 11 mission and the Space Shuttle program, were featured in the "Art + Flight" exhibit at the Museum of Flight in Tukwila, Washington. The exhibit ran from June 2023 to January 2024.

== Artistry, personal life and death ==
Veregge described his artistic style as being "Salish geek" because of how he combined traditional Coast Salish aesthetics with pop-culture characters and references. He also described his style using a Lushootseed word, "taʔčaʔx̣ʷéʔtəŋ," which translates to "get into trouble." Veregge was an enrolled member of the Port Gamble Band of S'Klallam Indians. He married Christina Godbolt in 1996. The two had three children. He was a personal friend of Washington State Senator Drew Hansen. In 2021, Veregge was diagnosed with lupus and was forced to mostly retire from art. He died on April 12, 2024 from a heart attack.
