= Timothy Montler =

American linguist

Timothy Montler is an American academic and linguist. Montler is a professor of linguistics at the University of North Texas, as of 2013. He has worked to preserve the Klallam language since 1990.

Montler collaborated with Adeline Smith, a Lower Elwha Klallam Tribe elder, to create the first Klallam language alphabet. He and Smith also composed the world's first Klallam language dictionary, which was published in December 2012 by the University of Washington Press. Montler and Smith had collaborated on the Klallam lexicon throughout the 1990s, 2000–02, and early 2010s. Adeline Smith added 12,000 words and phrases, the largest single contribution to the dictionary. Montler also worked closely with other Native Klallam speakers, including Hazel Sampson, Ed Sampson, and Bea Charles.
