= Port Angeles High School =

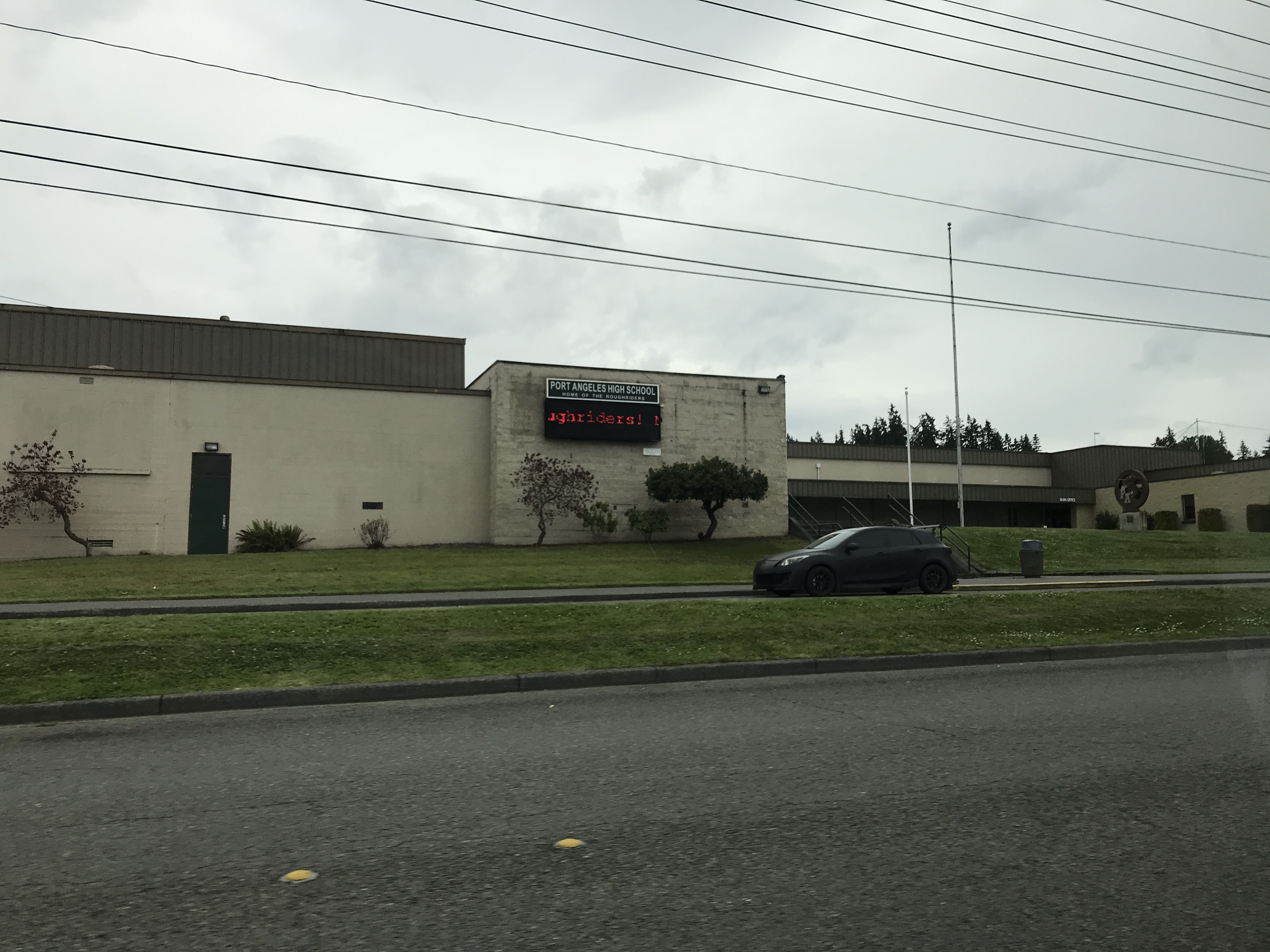

Location
- 304 E Park Ave. Port Angeles, Washington 98362; 48°06′03″N 123°26′27″W

Information
- Type: Public high school
- Established: 1953
- School district: Port Angeles School District
- Principal: Jeff Lunt
- Staff: 48.70 (FTE)
- Grades: 9-12
- Student to teacher ratio: 20.45
- Color
- Mascot: Roughrider
- Athletic facilities: Civic Stadium
- Website: pahs.portangelesschools.org

Port Angeles High School (PAHS) is a public high school in Port Angeles, Washington, United States. It is part of the Port Angeles School District. It is the largest high school in the North Olympic Peninsula region.

Built in 1953, the facilities are located on 33 acres within a block of Olympic National Park borders. The school has views of the Olympic Mountain Range and the Salish Sea from the campus buildings. The school's mascot is the Roughrider, depicting Theodore Roosevelt on a horse in his role as commander of the First U.S. Volunteer Cavalry. The school's colors are green and white.

== Academics ==
In addition to core courses, PAHS offers honors and Advanced Placement courses, a full range of traditional vocational courses, four choirs, five bands, four orchestras, and a full range of fine art courses. Junior and senior students have the option of taking courses at nearby Peninsula College for both high school and college credit. Similarly, a program known as "college in the high school" allows sophomores (second semester only), juniors, and seniors to take classes for both high school and college credit, without actually going to the college building itself.

Classes include Astronomy, World History, Calculus, and American Government. It is the only high school in the U.S. that offers Klallam language courses, due to its proximity to the Lower Elwha Klallam Tribe reservation on the Elwha River delta and high number of tribal members who attend the school.

Also included is a local funds program for graduating seniors who plan further education. The program typically receives $275,000 but over $900,000 in scholarships when combined with college-offered scholarships and other awards.

== Athletics ==
Football, baseball and soccer games are played at Civic Field, a city-owned stadium about 1.5 miles from the school. The school athletic teams have won various accolades for their performance during sports games. PAHS also offers a variety of seasonal sports:

- Fall: cross country, football, girls' soccer, girls' swimming/diving, volleyball, boys' tennis
- Winter: boys' basketball, girls' basketball, gymnastics, boys' swimming/diving, wrestling, girls' bowling, girls' flag football
- Spring: baseball, boys' soccer, girls' softball, track, golf, girls' tennis

== NJROTC ==
Port Angeles High School's Navy Junior Reserve Officer Training Corps "Roughrider Company" is a highly decorated unit with approximately 120 cadets. The unit achieved a 98 percent on-time graduation rate for cadets with four years in the unit, and has received the Distinguished Unit with Honors Award annually since 2006.

The unit won the state championship at the Northwest Drill and Rifle Championships in Tacoma, Washington, on March 14, 2015, among other recognition.

== PAHS Performing Arts Center ==
The school is home to the Port Angeles Performing Arts Center. The 1,150-seat auditorium was constructed in 1958 and significantly remodeled in 1978. In addition to school use, it is the venue for community arts organizations such as the Port Angeles Symphony Orchestra, Sequim City Band, PALOA Musical Theater, Olympic Barbershop, Peninsula Men's Gospel Singers, Arts Northwest, and Ballet Workshop. Notable performances it has hosted include Arlo Guthrie and the internationally acclaimed men's choir Ladysmith Black Mambazo.

== Student media controversy ==
In 2012, the PAHS student newspaper, the Timberline, came to the center of controversy within the scholastic community when then-Principal Garry Cameron nearly prevented distribution of the newspaper because of the appearance of the letters "G-A-Y" in a word search puzzle. Students claimed that the letters had been featured in the puzzle unintentionally and that Cameron did not have any legitimate basis for restricting distribution. A few pages later in the edition, students had written a story about President Barack Obama's endorsement of same-sex marriage in which the word "gay" was used multiple times. Cameron did not object to the use of the word in that story.
