= Battle of Port Gamble =

US Navy attack on Tlingit tribe in 1856

- Part of American Indian Wars
Date	November 21, 1856
Location	Port Gamble, Washington, United States 47.854°N 122.584°W
Result	United States victory

Belligerents
United States	Haida raiders from Alaska

Commanders and leaders
Samuel Swartout	Unknown

Casualties and losses
1 killed	27 killed, 21 wounded

The Battle of Port Gamble was an isolated engagement between the United States and the Haida on 21 November 1856. It occurred during, but was not a part of, the Yakima War.

== Background ==
The Haida of British Columbia and Alaska, among other groups, had, since time immemorial, periodically conducted raiding expeditions against the Coast Salish peoples of the Puget Sound, who were used as a source for slave labor. Northwest Coast Native maritime technology was unsurpassed among First Nations peoples and raiding parties would travel in large dugout canoes at distances of up to 1,000 miles. The largest of these canoes could hold 100 warriors and their equipment. These raids continued even after the demarcation of the border between the United States and Canada, which was then controlled by the United Kingdom.

== Conflict ==
In November 1856 a Haida party, consisting of approximately 100 warriors and their accompanying families, entered Puget Sound in a fleet of canoes, in what was then the Washington Territory. When the force approached the town of Steilacoom, residents alerted the U.S. Army garrison at Fort Steilacoom who, in turn, sent word to the nearby U.S. Navy gunboat USS Massachusetts. Even so, before the USS Massachusetts could arrive, the Haida had already withdrawn north.

Port Gamble is located on Puget Sound at the entrance to Port Gamble Bay.

On November 20 the Haida approached the logging community of Port Gamble, near which was located the Port Gamble Band of S’Klallam Indians some of whose members worked at the nearby sawmill. Josiah Keller, superintendent of the mill, sounded the mill's whistle prompting the community to evacuate to a blockhouse that had been previously constructed for this eventuality. USS Massachusetts arrived at Port Gamble soon thereafter and, finding that the Haida party had landed and camped at the edge of town, placed a force of 18 armed sailors ashore. The skipper of USS Massachusetts, Commander Samuel Swartwout, twice sent messengers to the Haida chiefs with offers to tow them to Victoria, but each offer was rebuffed. The next morning, Swartwout began shelling the Haida camp with the deck guns of the Massachusetts, inflicting heavy casualties on the party before they managed to retreat to the forest. During the Haida withdrawal, small arms fire was exchanged between the war party and USS Massachusetts' sailors, resulting in the death of coxswain Gustavus Engelbrecht, the only American casualty in the battle and the first U.S. Navy battle death in the Pacific. After the Haida had abandoned the field, the landing party from USS Massachusetts proceeded to destroy the beached Haida canoes and burn their provisions.

Two days later the surviving Haida surrendered. The Haida prisoners were issued a ration of bread and molasses and given 24 hours to bury their dead, after which they were taken aboard the USS Massachusetts with the intention of taking them to British Columbia. When the ship arrived in Victoria, however, British Columbia governor James Douglas objected to the landing of the Haida in the colony. In a dispatch sent to colonial secretary Henry Labouchère, Douglas described Swartwout's reaction,

Captain Swartwout appeared disappointed and irritated at my decision, and somewhat inconsiderately held out a threat of landing his prisoners, with or without my sanction, on some of the uninhabited islets on our coast, but on being reminded that such a course, would be a breach of international law, and immediately become the subject of complaint to his Government, he apologized for the warmth into which he had been inadvertently betrayed.

Swartwout and Douglas eventually reached a compromise: the Haida were provisioned with food and new canoes, then dropped off near the border of Russian America.

== Aftermath ==
Because one of the Haida killed in the Battle of Port Gamble was a chief, under Haida custom, a "chief" of the enemy had to be killed in revenge. On August 11, 1857, the Haida returned to Washington Territory, landing at Whidbey Island. After inquiring among residents there if any local chiefs were around, they decided to find and kill Dr. John Coe Kellogg who lived near Admiralty Head. Discovering Kellogg was out of the area, they then chose Colonel Isaac N. Ebey as their target. After heading roughly a half mile north by water and landing at the beach below Ebey's land, the tribal members knocked on the door of the Ebey home. After opening the door, Ebey was shot on his porch by the Haida before being scalped. The Ebey family escaped to a family member's adjacent property for safety before the tribal party decapitated Colonel Ebey. The group then left with his head as a trophy and proof to their tribe that the mission was completed.

With increased policing of the Canada–United States border, Northern incursions into Washington steadily dropped in the years following the Battle of Port Gamble. Later incidents involving the Haida and United States tribes occurred in 1859 when Suquamish warriors repelled a Haida landing on the western shore of Bainbridge Island; a confrontation between the Snohomish and Haida in August 1860.

== See also ==
- Ebey's Landing National Historical Reserve
