= Little Boston, Washington =

Unincorporated community in Washington, United States

- Unincorporated community
- Location in Washington and the United States Little Boston (the United States)
- Coordinates: 47°51′08″N 122°34′12″W
- Country: United States
- State: Washington
- County: Kitsap
- Elevation: 66 ft (20 m)
- Time zone: UTC-8 (Pacific (PST))
  - Summer (DST): UTC-7 (PDT)
- ZIP codes: 98346
- GNIS feature ID: 1511101

Little Boston is a community in Kitsap County, Washington, United States. It is located on the east side of Port Gamble, an inlet or bay of Hood Canal, and is direct across the bay from the unincorporated community of Port Gamble. Little Boston is within the Port Gamble Indian Reservation, which houses the Port Gamble band of the S'Klallam tribe.

The Port Gamble S'Klallam Reservation consists of 1,340 acres (5 km^{2}) of land held in trust by the federal government. There is no private land ownership on the reservation. Most of the land is in the forest with residential, business, and office areas. The land is listed by the U.S. Census Bureau as the Port Gamble Tribal Community census-designated place, with a population of 916 as of the 2010 census.

The reservation receives approximately 20 inches (510 mm) of rain per year due to its location in the Olympic Mountain rain shadow. The reservation lands rise from the beach to gently rolling terrain.

Port Gamble Bay is the last bay in Kitsap County that is still open for commercial shellfish harvest. The Tribe has a hatchery on Middle Creek. Bear, deer, and other wildlife also live on the reservation.

== History ==
On June 16, 1938, the S'Klallam tribe received a 1,234-acre (4.99 km^{2}) reservation on Port Gamble Bay, which is their historic home.

At the time that the United States organized Oregon Territory in 1848, the S'Klallams lived in villages on the west side of Port Gamble Bay. In the summer of 1853, Josiah Keller arrived by ship to build a sawmill for the Puget Mill Co. He asked the Native Americans to move across the bay to make room for the mill and he offered free lumber for their homes, free firewood, and Christmas gifts. The S'Klallams agreed. Keller's mill prospered and many S'Klallams worked there. Eventually, the Puget Mill Co. and other lumber companies acquired title to all the land around Port Gamble Bay.

The S'Klallams ceded their rights to the land in the treaty of Point No Point on January 26, 1855. Under that agreement, the tribe was supposed to move to a reservation along with the Skokomish. Few S'Klallams were interested in moving. They continued to make their living from the water and the land and they got jobs at the mill.

Little Boston (named by a Yankee sea captain) consisted of frame homes built on the sand spit. Water was carried in a wood trough and residents used diversion boards to direct their share from the flume. The homes stood on stilts because of tides and sanitary facilities consisted of privies over the mudflats connected with wooden walkways.

Some individual S'Klallams bought their own land along the bay either for cash or under the Indian Homestead Act. Once the land had been logged, it was of little interest to the logging companies. Much of these titles were lost in the Great Depression when the owners could not pay county taxes.

Under the Indian Reorganization Act of 1934, the U.S. Government purchased land for reservations. The Department of the Interior bought up land from Puget Mill Co. and established the S'Klallam (spelled Clallam) Reservation in 1938. Health officials burned the community of Little Boston because it represented a health hazard, and new homes were built on the reservation.

== Notable residents ==
- Jeffrey Veregge (1975-2024), S'Klallam artist
