= Northwest Straits Commission =

Marine Conservation Advisory

The Northwest Straits Commission was established by US Congress in 1998 as the Northwest Straits Advisory Commission (referred to as the ‘‘Commission’’) in the Northwest Straits Marine Conservation Initiative Act. The commission, based at Padilla Bay National Estuarine Reserve, is administered by the Washington State Department of Ecology and provides base funding for seven Marine Resources Committees (MRCs) in Whatcom, Skagit, Snohomish, San Juan, Island, Jefferson and Clallam counties. The Commission includes state appointees, representatives of seven MRC counties, a tribal representative and a representative from Puget Sound Partnership.
