= Port Gamble Tribal Community, Washington =

Port Gamble Tribal Community
- Census-designated place
- Location within Washington (state) Location within the United States
- Coordinates: 47°51′14″N 122°34′2″W
- Country: United States
- State: Washington
- County: Kitsap

Area
  - Total: 4.87 sq mi (12.62 km^{2})
  - Land: 4.23 sq mi (10.95 km^{2})
  - Water: 0.64 sq mi (1.67 km^{2})
- Elevation: 246 ft (75 m)

Population (2010)
  - Total: 916
  - Density: 217/sq mi (83.6/km^{2})
- Time zone: UTC-8 (Pacific (PST))
  - Summer (DST): UTC-7 (PDT)
- ZIP Code: 98346
- Area code(s): 360, 564
- FIPS code: 53-55612
- GNIS feature ID: 2585020

Port Gamble Tribal Community is a census-designated place (CDP) corresponding to the Port Gamble S'Klallam Reservation in Kitsap County, Washington, United States. As of the 2020 census, Port Gamble Tribal Community had a population of 1,010.

== Geography ==
The tribal community is in northern Kitsap County, on the east side of Port Gamble, an embayment of Hood Canal. It includes the unincorporated community of Little Boston. Directly across the bay to the west is the unincorporated community and historic district of Port Gamble. The tribal community is 6 miles (10 km) northwest of Kingston and 19 miles (31 km) north of Bainbridge Island.

According to the United States Census Bureau, the Port Gamble Tribal Community CDP has a total area of 4.9 square miles (12.6 km^{2}), of which 4.2 square miles (11.0 km^{2}) are land and 0.7 square miles (1.7 km^{2}), or 13.21%, are water.

== Demographics ==
Historical population
Census	Pop.	Note	%±
2010	916		—
2020	1,010		10.3%
U.S. Decennial Census; 2000 2010

The Port Gamble Tribal Community first appeared as a census designated place in the 2010 U.S. census.

=== Racial and ethnic composition ===
Port Gamble Tribal Community CDP, Washington – Racial and ethnic composition Note: the US Census treats Hispanic/Latino as an ethnic category. This table excludes Latinos from the racial categories and assigns them to a separate category. Hispanics/Latinos may be of any race.
Race / Ethnicity (NH = Non-Hispanic)	Pop 2010	Pop 2020	% 2010	% 2020
White alone (NH)	298	297	32.53%	29.41%
Black or African American alone (NH)	0	4	0.00%	0.40%
Native American or Alaska Native alone (NH)	543	586	59.28%	58.02%
Asian alone (NH)	3	9	0.33%	0.89%
Native Hawaiian or Pacific Islander alone (NH)	0	0	0.00%	0.00%
Other race alone (NH)	0	5	0.00%	0.50%
Mixed race or Multiracial (NH)	32	60	3.49%	5.94%
Hispanic or Latino (any race)	40	49	4.37%	4.85%
Total	916	1,010	100.00%	100.00%
