= Marine Resources Committees =

Government board for maritime counties in the U.S

The Marine Resources Committees (MRC) are a type of government board for maritime counties in the U.S. state of Washington. It is part of the Northwest Straits Marine Conservation Initiative, enacted in 1998. Seven of the state's counties have MRCs: Whatcom, Skagit, Snohomish, Clallam, Island, Jefferson and San Juan. The first MRC was San Juan County in 1996, setting an example for others. A typical MRC has representation from local government, tribal government, the local port district, local business, and the scientific, recreational and conservation communities. Funding for the MRCs comes from federal, state, and local governments and non-profit groups. General operational funding is provided by the Northwest Straits Commission. Each MRC has a representative who sits on the Northwest Straits Commission board, making up the majority of the group. These committees perform baseline studies of Northern Puget Sound and provide solutions for protection of the waters and their habitats. They also serve to carry out the overall mission of the Northwest Straits Marine Conservation Initiative.
