= Port Gamble, Washington =

Unincorporated community in Washington, US

- Port Gamble Historic District
- U.S. National Register of Historic Places
- U.S. National Historic Landmark District
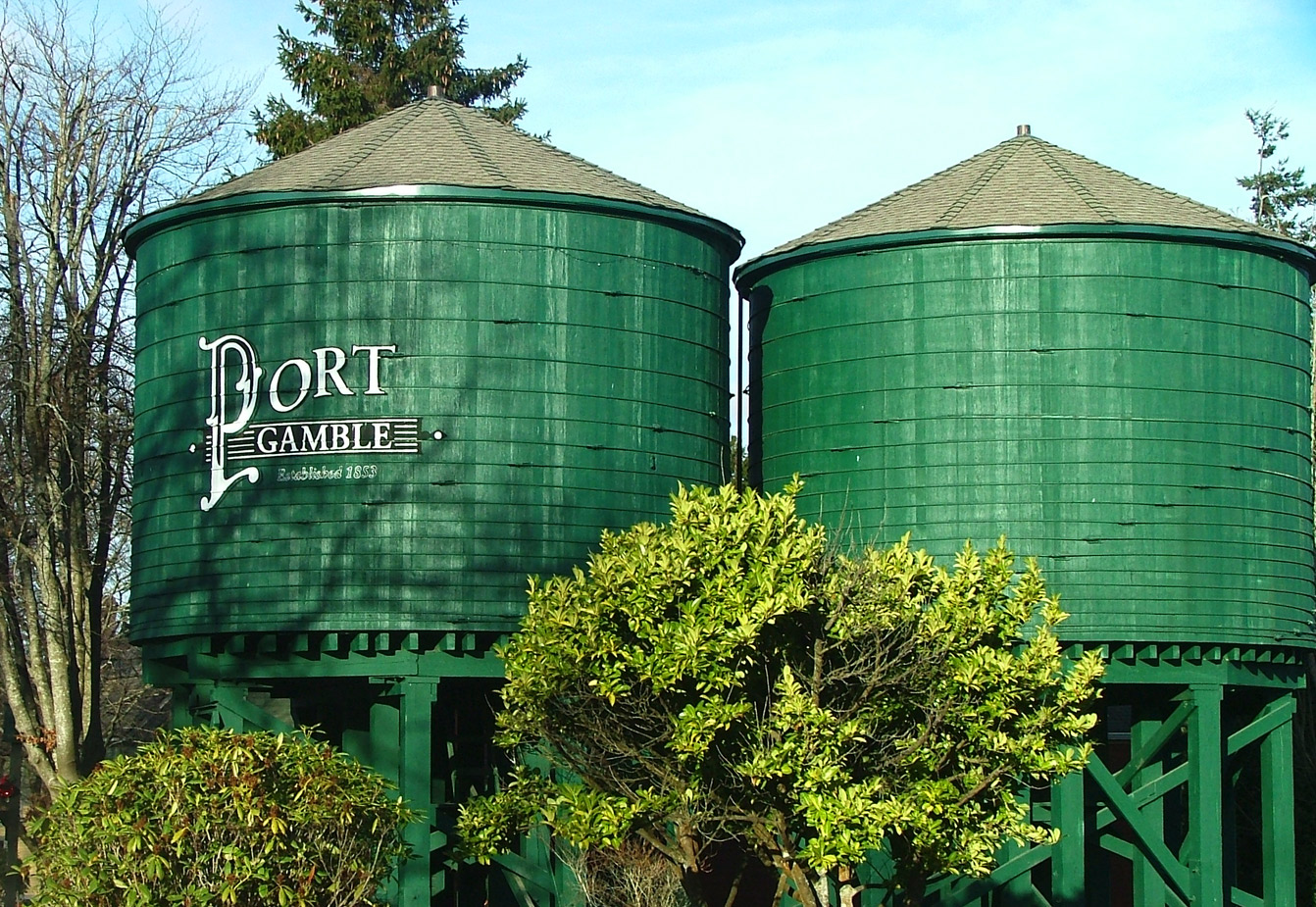
- Water towers in Port Gamble

- Location within Washington (state)
- Location: Port Gamble, Washington
- Coordinates: 47°51′15″N 122°35′02″W
- Built: 1853
- Architectural style: Greek Revival, Late Victorian
- NRHP reference No.: 66000746

Significant dates
- Added to NRHP: November 13, 1966
- Designated NHLD: November 13, 1966

Port Gamble (Lushootseed: q̓əq̓lax̌ad) is an unincorporated community on the northwestern shore of the Kitsap Peninsula in Kitsap County, Washington, United States. It is also a small, eponymous bay, along which the community lies, near the entrance to Hood Canal. The unincorporated communities of Port Gamble and Little Boston, part of Kitsap County, lie on the west and the east side, respectively, of the mouth of this bay. The Port Gamble Historic District, a U.S. National Historic Landmark, covers one of the nation's best-preserved western lumber towns.

The community of Port Gamble has a wide range of shops from antiques to a tea shop to an old-fashioned general store. It is a popular tourist destination, due to its location near Bremerton, Port Townsend, Bainbridge Island, and Seattle. Port Gamble is home to the grave of Gustave Englebrecht, the first U.S. Navy sailor to die in the Pacific.

== History ==
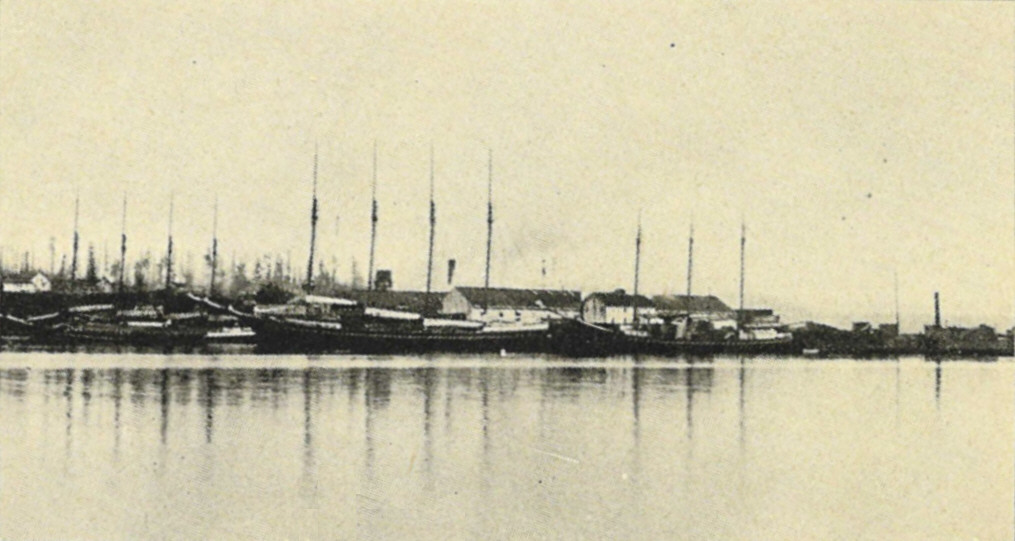
Port Gamble, 1900

Gamble Bay was named by the Wilkes Expedition in 1841. The source of the name is unclear. Wilkes often named places after historical figures, and speculation centers on Lt. Col. John M. Gamble, an illustrious figure in the War of 1812; or U.S. Navy Lt. Robert Gamble, an officer aboard the frigate USS President wounded in an exchange with HMS Belvidera. But the name may have had a more prosaic origin. Wilkes's published account of the expedition omits mention of either Gamble but does say that a lieutenant's survey party "[o]n entering [Hood's] canal [at what would become Gamble Bay] camped near some Suquamish Indians who had received as visitors a party of fifty Clalams, by appointment to gamble for blankets: they continued their games throughout the night."

The community, originally known as "Teekalet" and later renamed "Port Gamble" for the bay which gave it access to ocean commerce, was founded as a company town by Josiah Keller, William Talbot, and Andrew Pope's Puget Mill Company in 1853.

In 1856, USS Massachusetts was sent from Seattle to Port Gamble on the Puget Sound, where indigenous raiding parties from British and Russian territories had been enslaving local Native Americans. When the warriors refused to hand over those among them who had attacked the Puget Sound Native American communities, Massachusetts landed a shore party and a battle ensued in which 26 natives and 1 sailor were killed. In the aftermath of this, Colonel Isaac Ebey, the first white settler on Whidbey Island, was shot and beheaded on August 11, 1857, by a Haida raiding party in revenge for the killing of a native chief during similar raids the year before. British authorities demurred on pursuing or attacking the northern tribes as they passed northward through British waters off Victoria, and Ebey's killers were never caught.

The first school in the county went up in 1859, and the community took its present name in 1868. In 1966, the town of Port Gamble was designated a National Historic Landmark District. In 1985, Pope & Talbot, the successor company to Puget Mill, split into Pope & Talbot and Pope Resources, the latter of which took over the site and the sawmill. In 1995, the mill shut down after 142 years, ending the longest span of operation of any sawmill in the country.

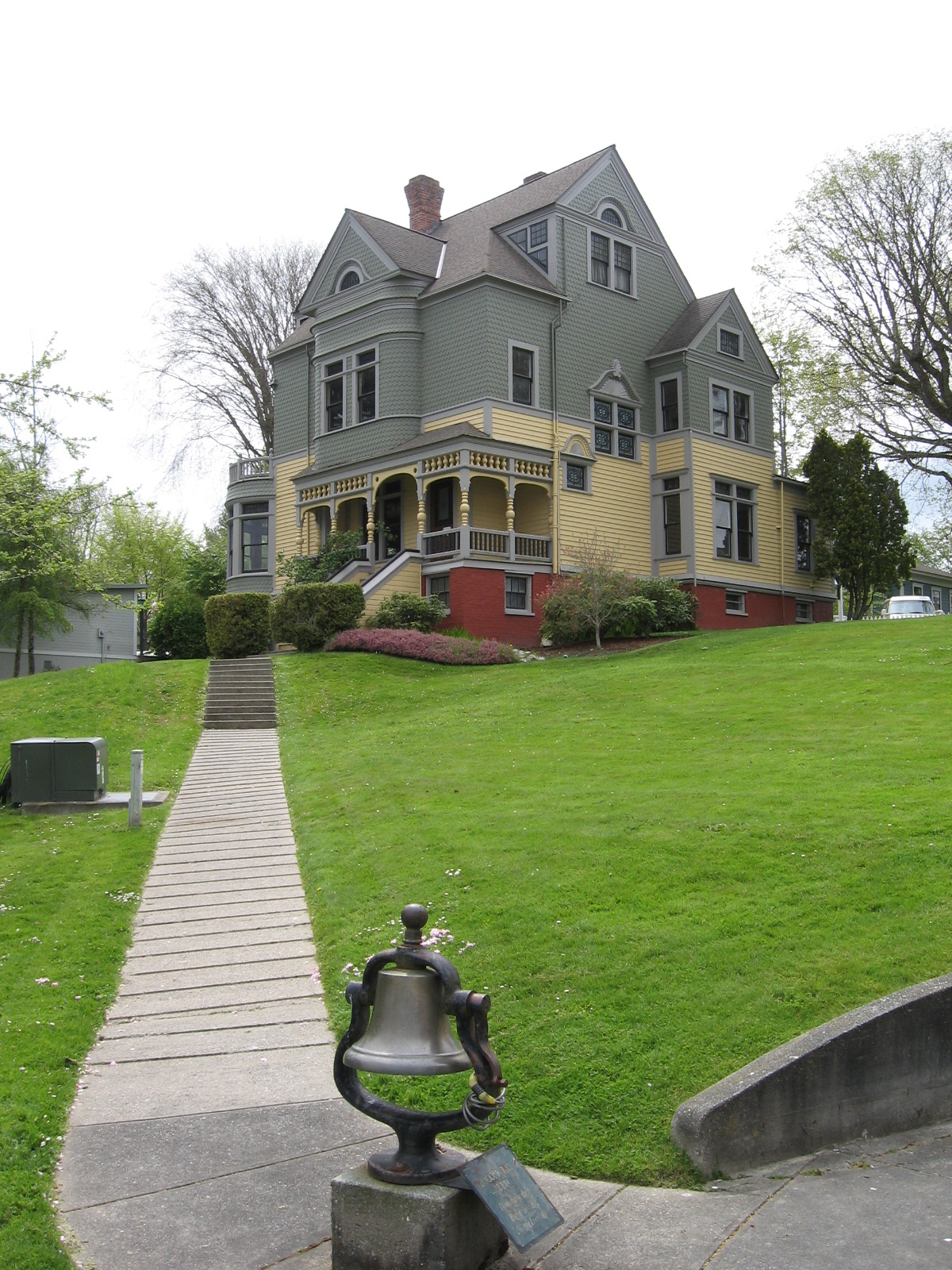
Walker-Ames house in Port Gamble

=== Founding ===
In 1849, William Talbot and Andrew Pope arrived in San Francisco from East Machias, Maine, in hope of taking part in its shipping and lumber industry, for the shipping of lumber to the rapidly growing Western United States was becoming a very lucrative business. Pope and Talbot quickly realized that the lumber shipments from New England were not enough to meet the growing demand for building materials in the West. After hearing about the dense forests in the Oregon Territory, Talbot and Pope, along with partners Josiah Keller and Charles Foster, formed the Puget Mill Company to harvest the much-needed lumber for the expanding West. In the summer of 1853, Talbot, after searching the Puget Sound area for the best possible site for a mill, spotted a sand spit at the mouth of Gamble Bay as an excellent location, for it provided a location near the abundant trees of the Oregon Territory and a port for shipping the cut lumber to California. Soon after arriving, Keller sailed up the coast to join him with the boiler, engine, and muley saw for the mill. By September, the new mill was cutting logs into lumber.

Although they had a ready and working mill, Pope, Keller, and Talbot had difficulty finding enough workers to run the mill. During the 1850s, the Pacific Northwest was frontier territory with little population. With the help of their partner in Maine, Charles Foster, the mill was able to recruit experienced mill workers from East Machias to come west to Gamble Bay. In their new and labor-intensive environment, workers quickly became homesick for the lifestyle they had left behind in Maine. As houses were constructed for workers' and company executives' families, the design reflected their desire to feel at home, as the architecture looked like that which could be found in a New England city. This new little town that grew up by the mill was named "Port Gamble" after its location on Gamble Bay, which had been named by the American explorer Commodore Wilkes in 1842.

The founders of the mill of Port Gamble, however, were not the first to occupy Gamble Bay. The S'Klallams, or Nux Sklai Yem, had been living in the Puget Sound region since 2400 B.C. Legally, land was not available for non-Native settlement until March 8, 1859, when Congress ratified the Treaty of Point No Point, which was signed January 26, 1855, by representatives of the United States and the Chemakum, S'Klallam and Skokomish nations. But by that time, the Port Gamble S'Klallam Tribe had moved across the bay to Point Julia. As part of an agreement between them and the mill company, the S'Klallams were given jobs at the mill and lumber to build their new homes, community facilities, and a new school. The new little town across Gamble Bay became known as Little Boston.

=== Tree farms ===
As the Port Gamble mill continued to expand and increase its production of lumber, their need for suitable logging areas increased. The Puget Mill Company continued purchasing viable timberland, and by 1892 had ownership of 186,000 acres (750 km^{2}). With the depletion of forestland in other states, more and more companies turned to Washington to supply the growing need for timber. By 1906 there were over 900 lumber mills of various sizes in Washington alone.

As Washington's old-growth forests were dwindling, the need for new sources of lumber became readily apparent. On June 12, 1941, the Weyerhaeuser Timber Company designated the first certified tree farm, the Clemons Tree Farm in Washington state. The Puget Mill Company, now known as Pope & Talbot, Inc., soon followed suit, forming the Hood Canal Tree Farm in 1946 and having 75,000 acres (30,000 ha) in it by 1953.

=== Economic boom of Port Gamble ===
During the mid-1800s, California experienced an expansive economic boom and an increase in population from the California Gold Rush. The gold rush opened the door to a vast unknown of resources and fortune. The constant flow of settlers into the frontier and expanding economic influence demanded a high level of resources to maintain stability and growth. California then looked to tap into the high abundance of timber and mining in the Oregon Territory. This called for three explorers to set sail up along the Pacific Coast to explore the unknown territory. When William Talbot, Andrew Pope, and Josiah Keller washed up on the sandy shores of the Hood Canal they discovered the fortune of timber along the Olympic Peninsula. Talbot, a lumber merchant from the San Francisco area, partnered with Pope who was an experienced sea captain. The characteristics of the two men drove them through the ups and downs of global economic woes and stiff competition, especially their eventual counterparts in the Oregon Territory. After the founding of Port Gamble, these three men established the longest-working lumber mill on the North American continent.

Port Gamble established itself as an industrial power house globally. The Puget Mill Company became a source of lumber all around the world from Shanghai to Cape Town, South Africa. Trees coming straight from the Olympic Peninsula were shipped to 37 other ports around the world. By 1862, the Puget Mill Company owned a fleet of ten vessels and was shipping almost 19 million board feet of lumber to foreign outlets.

During the turn of the century, the Puget Mill Company and the Pope and Talbot Lumber Company shipped their lumber from Port Gamble across the Atlantic Ocean to be used in the British, French and Russian navies for their sparring around the world. Captain Keller took hold of the shipment plans for the Pope and Talbot Lumber Company and created routes along the Pacific Coast to help supply the large demands of the California Gold Rush. This transportation of lumber opened the door for shipments to China and Southeast Asia. Because Talbot and Pope hailed from the state of Maine, their connections to the East Coast and constant travels back to their hometown, many of the ports along South America and the West Indies experienced contact from the Port Gamble shipments.

=== Sale of Puget Mill Company ===
In July 1925, the board of directors for the Puget Mill Company, including William H. Talbot, George A. Pope Sr., Talbot C. Walker, John Deahl and A.G. Harms, met to discuss the sale of the company. A little over a year earlier in May 1924, William Talbot had already reached his own decision regarding the future of the Port Gamble mill. In a letter to Northwest Operations Manager, E.G. Ames, Talbot mentioned that it was "suicidal to continue operating the Port Gamble Mill." He also informed Ames that production of lumber at the mill must cease once all remaining orders had been filled. When the board of directors met over a year later it took only a few minutes for them to decide that selling the company was the only option. After the meeting had concluded, Talbot met with Charles McCormick of the Charles McCormick Lumber Company, who agreed to purchase the Puget Mill Company for $15 million.

This was a significant period in the history of Port Gamble and the Puget Mill Company. For almost a hundred years the Puget Mill Company had been owned and operated by the descendants of the Pope and Talbot families, but this sale meant that the mill would no longer be operated by the descendants of the men that had helped establish Port Gamble. William H. Talbot was reluctant to sell the company, but the early 1900s were a trying time for the lumber industry. The troubles for the company began in 1907, when the state of Washington instituted a tax increase on timber acreage held by mill companies. This, combined with inefficient operations, outdated equipment, and increasingly dilapidated facilities, became too much of a burden for William Talbot. Despite the sale of the company, Talbot devised a way to ensure that the Port Gamble Mill would remain operational. In the agreement with McCormick, Talbot specified that McCormick must build a brand new mill at Port Gamble.

=== Creation of Pope & Talbot Co. ===
McCormick had very little success as the president and owner of the Puget Mill Company. The cost of building the new mill in Port Gamble along with the cost of modernizations and improvements being made to other mills quickly added to the company's debt. In 1938, McCormick owed over $7 million to the original owners of Puget Mill, but unable to make payments, McCormick was forced to return all of the company holdings to the principals of the foreclosure suit filed against him. The principals were all descendants of the original founders of the Puget Mill Company. By 1940 the company was running under the guidance of another descendant of the Pope family, George Pope Sr., when it was decided that the business should be renamed Pope & Talbot Mills. The entrance of the U.S. into World War II brought plenty of business to Pope & Talbot Mills. During the entire war the mills operated at full capacity. The company's vessels were involved in transporting supplies necessary for battle to areas of conflict such as Guadalcanal and Okinawa.

== Preservation ==
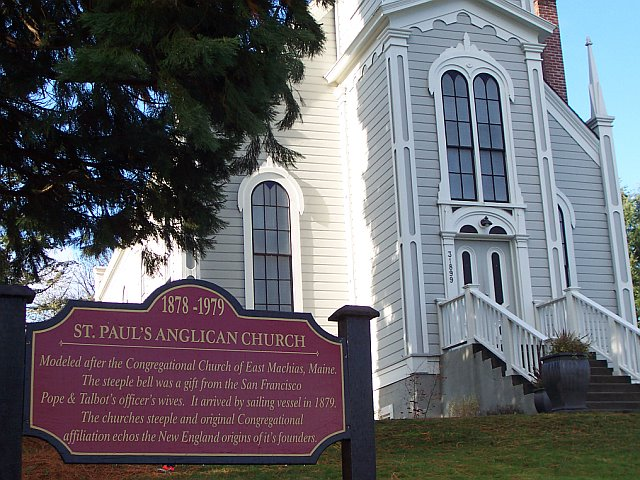
St. Paul's church, Port Gamble, Washington

Many of the buildings are well maintained historical sites. Most of the town is still owned today by the mill. There is an old church that has been restored to its original condition. The St. Paul's Episcopal Church "on Rainier Avenue dates from 1870. Built from the same plans used for the construction of the village church in East Machias, Maine, in 1836." Many of the remnants of the colonial architecture are left behind from the settlers who had come from Maine such as Pope and Talbot. The National Park Service has cited Port Gamble as "the finest example of a nineteenth century Pacific Coast logging community." The Port Gamble Historical Museum tells the history of the town and how the Pope and Talbot mill impacted the community. The general store was the "first building [that] was constructed in 1853 on the mill site, a 'rough structure' built of lumber shipped from Maine and shingled with cedar split cut nearby. Employees picked up paychecks at the office. The store sold coffee, pickles, boots, crockery, brooms, windows, toys, gloves, tools and other goods to employees, settlers, sailors, loggers, and the S'kallam tribe."

A general store still stands in the town, renovated to its 1916 form and now a tourist attraction. The town has an Old Mills Days festival that keeps alive the spirit of the mill. Port Gamble gives out pamphlets for a walking tour to the historic buildings.

The preservation of the town of Port Gamble began in the mid-1960s, when Pope & Talbot rebuilt and restored thirty houses and buildings, located utilities underground, and installed gas street lamps. In 1966, Port Gamble was declared a National Historic Landmark. One of the oldest houses in Port Gamble that is still standing is the Thompson house, built in 1859 and owned by James A. Thompson.

== Events ==
The annual Old Mill Days festival takes place over the course of three days during early July and encompasses the entire downtown area. The event includes craft and food stands, a logging show, fireworks, and various other forms of entertainment.

== In popular culture ==
Port Gamble was the setting of and filming location for the 2010 film ZMD: Zombies of Mass Destruction. Author Gregg Olsen made Port Gamble the setting for his "Empty Coffin" series of books, which include Betrayal and Envy.

== See also ==
- Ebey's Landing National Historical Reserve
- Old Man House
- John M. Gamble
- Battle of Port Gamble
