= Northwest Straits Marine Conservation Initiative =

Environmental conservation organization

The Northwest Straits Marine Conservation Initiative or Northwest Straits Initiative (NWSI) was established in the United States under Title IV of Public Law 105–384 in 1998. It is composed of the Northwest Straits Commission, the Marine Resources Committees, and the Northwest Straits Foundation.

The NWSI was born from political deadlock over the proposed formation of a federal marine sanctuary in the waters of northwest Washington, including Strait of Juan de Fuca and the San Juan Islands. Democratic Senator Patty Murray and Republican Congressman Jack Metcalf proposed the Initiative as an alternative to the marine sanctuary. Its base operations are federally-funded.

The NWSI focuses on conservation and restoration of Puget Sound in northwest Washington State and relies on the work of local, citizen-based Marine Resources Committees (located in seven counties) to prioritize actions in recovering the health of the sound. The seven Washington State counties are: Whatcom, Skagit, Snohomish, Island, San Juan, Jefferson and Clallam.
