= Tse-whit-zen =

Coordinates: 48.1302°N 123.4618°W

- Tse whit zen Village
- U.S. National Register of Historic Places
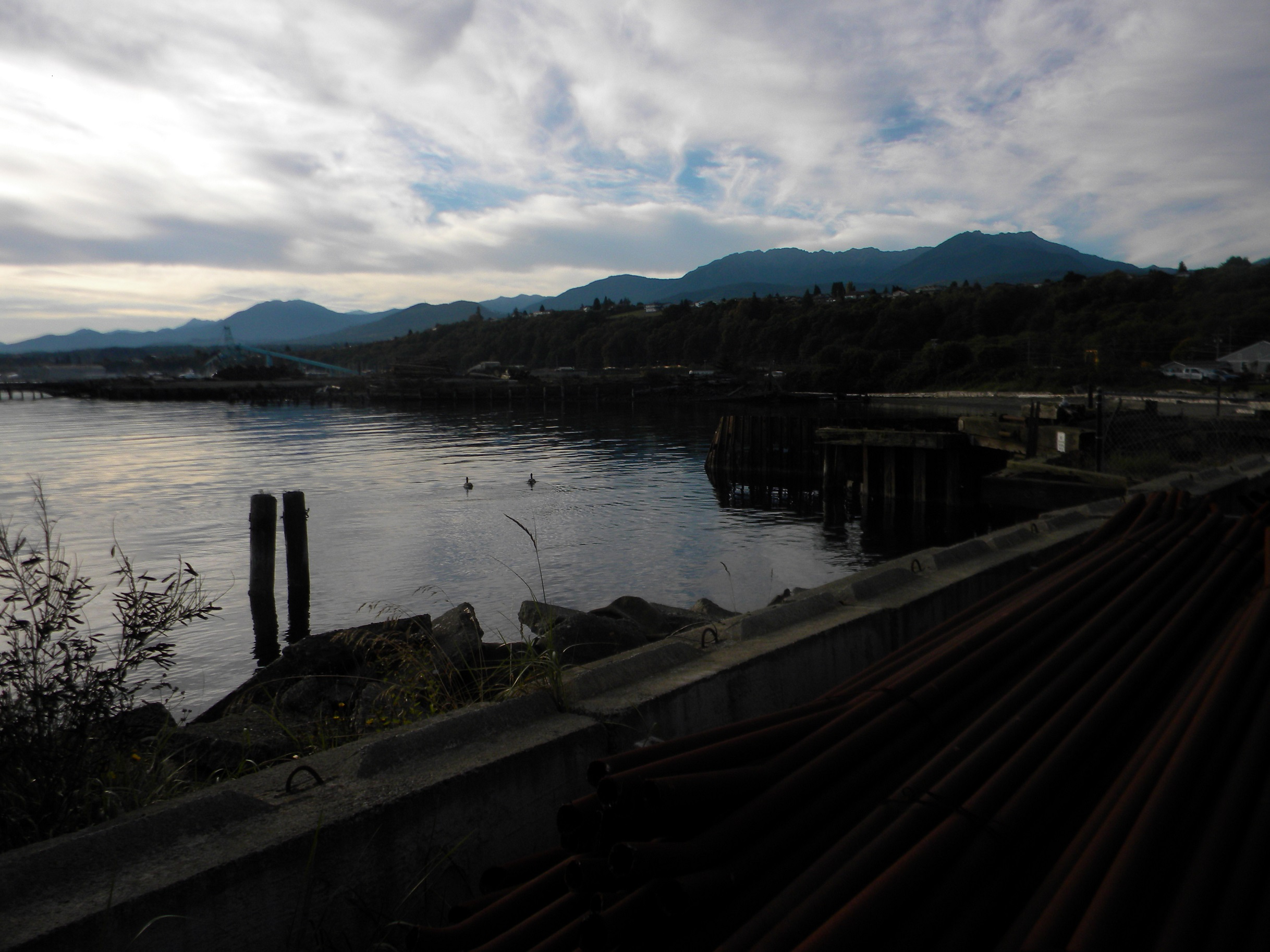
- Tse-whit-zen village site
- Location: Address restricted, Port Angeles, Washington
- NRHP reference No.: 14000848
- Added to NRHP: October 8, 2014

Tse-whit-zen (č̕ixʷícən [t͡ʃʼiˈxʷit͡sən] in the Klallam language, meaning "inner harbor") was a 1,700- to 2,700-year-old village of the Lower Elwha Klallam Tribe located along the Port Angeles, Washington waterfront. It was located at the base of Ediz Hook on the Olympic Peninsula. During construction in August 2003 of a graving dock associated with replacement of the Hood Canal Bridge, the village's cemetery and other prehistoric remains were discovered. The construction project was abandoned at this site because of the importance of the find, as the village was intact. It is the largest pre-European contact village site excavated in Washington State.

Archaeological excavation has revealed more than 10,000 artifacts and more than 335 intact skeletons. The Washington State Department of Transportation decided to halt all construction efforts related to the graving dock on December 21, 2004. Since then it has worked to ensure the preservation of remains and artifacts already uncovered by the construction.

As a result of a legal settlement with Washington State, the tribe received the land of the village site, as well as $2.5 million to build a cultural center or museum at the site. The tribe intended to begin construction around 2012.

== History ==
The Lower Elwha Klallam Tribe occupied the village of Tse-whit-zen for more than 2,700 years, according to radiocarbon dating. Their territory extended from this area along the Hoko River on the Strait of Juan de Fuca into the present-day Hood Canal, and this was one of several villages throughout the area. The earliest confirmed settlement at the village site dates to 750 B.C., about the same time as the founding of Rome, Italy.

This village site, which includes longhouse areas, ceremonial areas, places for fish and clam drying, was occupied by the Klallam until the 1930s. During the early 20th century, businesses owned by European Americans built a number of lumber mills on top of the village site at the waterfront during the expansion of the lumber industry. Because the ground was covered with 15 to 30 feet (4.6 to 9.1 m) of fill, the village and cemetery site was preserved through this period.

Archaeological excavation has revealed possibly eight long house structures.

Elder Adeline Smith of the Lower Elwha Klallam Tribe championed the preservation of Tse-whit-zen. As a child, Smith had been warned by adults never to walk on or play on the site of Tse-whit-zen, as it was considered sacred by her people. She was also instrumental in gaining removal of the Elwha Dam and contributing to preservation of the Klallam language through creating a dictionary and written form.

The site is the largest ancient (pre-contact) Native American village discovered in Washington state to date (as of 2013).
