= Jamestown, Washington =

- Census-designated place
- Location within Washington (state)
- Coordinates: 48°07′28″N 123°05′28″W
- Country: United States
- State: Washington
- County: Clallam

Area
  - Total: 0.58 sq mi (1.5 km^{2})
  - Land: 0.58 sq mi (1.5 km^{2})
  - Water: 0 sq mi (0.0 km^{2})
- Elevation: 26 ft (7.9 m)

Population (2020)
  - Total: 412
  - Density: 710/sq mi (270/km^{2})
- Time zone: UTC-8 (Pacific (PST))
  - Summer (DST): UTC-7 (PDT)
- ZIP Code: 98382
- Area code: 360, 564
- FIPS code: 53-33890
- GNIS feature ID: 2586735

Jamestown is an unincorporated community and census-designated place (CDP) in Clallam County, Washington, United States. As of the 2020 census, Jamestown had a population of 412.

The community derives its name from Chief James, a Clallam Indian leader.

== Geography ==
Jamestown is located in northeastern Clallam County, along the shore of the Strait of Juan de Fuca southeast of Dungeness. It is 4 miles (6 km) north of the city of Sequim.

According to the United States Census Bureau, the Jamestown CDP has a total area of 0.58 square miles (1.5 km^{2}), all of it land.

== Demographics ==
Historical population
Census	Pop.	Note	%±
2010	361		—
2020	412		14.1%
U.S. Decennial Census; 2000 2010

Jamestown first appeared as a census designated place in the 2010 U.S. census.

=== Racial and ethnic composition ===
Jamestown CDP, Washington – Racial and ethnic composition Note: the US Census treats Hispanic/Latino as an ethnic category. This table excludes Latinos from the racial categories and assigns them to a separate category. Hispanics/Latinos may be of any race.
Race / Ethnicity (NH = Non-Hispanic)	Pop 2010	Pop 2020	% 2010	% 2020
White alone (NH)	285	307	78.95%	74.51%
Black or African American alone (NH)	2	8	0.55%	1.94%
Native American or Alaska Native alone (NH)	40	31	11.08%	7.52%
Asian alone (NH)	3	3	0.83%	0.73%
Native Hawaiian or Pacific Islander alone (NH)	0	0	0.00%	0.00%
Other race alone (NH)	0	6	0.00%	1.46%
Mixed race or Multiracial (NH)	17	22	4.71%	5.34%
Hispanic or Latino (any race)	14	35	3.88%	8.50%
Total	361	412	100.00%	100.00%

== See also ==
- Jamestown S'Klallam Tribe of Washington
