= Jamestown S'Klallam Tribe of Washington =

Native American tribe

Coordinates: 48.0275°N 122.999167°W

Jamestown S'Klallam Tribe
Regions with significant populations
- United States (Washington)

Languages
- English, formerly Klallam language

The Jamestown S'Klallam Tribe is a federally recognized tribe of S'Klallam or Klallam Native Americans. They are on the northern Olympic Peninsula of Washington state in the northwestern United States.(S'klallam is a Salish term for "the strong people")

== History ==
The Jamestown S'Klallam Tribe was formalized by members of S'Klallam communities along the eastern end of the Strait of Juan de Fuca in 1874 when, faced with the threat of forced relocation by European colonizers, a group purchased a tract of 210 acres (0.85 km^{2}) and established a community near Dungeness named "Jamestown" in honor of village leader James Balch. This was a notable feat, since at the time Native people were legally barred from buying property. Despite periodic pressures to relocate to reservations, and without the Federal financial assistance that such relocation would have enabled, the Jamestown band maintained its independent community, and developed a viable economic base.

A century later, after a six-year effort to receive official recognition as a tribe, the United States Department of the Interior granted them such recognition on February 10, 1981.

== Reservation ==
Location of the Jamestown S'Klallam Indian Reservation

The Jamestown S'Klallam Indian Reservation is very small in area, comprising 0.145 km (13.49 acres) of land area on and near Sequim Bay along U.S. Route 101 in the community of Blyn, in extreme eastern Clallam County at the southwest corner of the Miller Peninsula. The reservation is the location of the tribal government administration, not a residential area. It includes the Jamestown S'Klallam Tribal Center (location of the tribe's administration, natural resources, social and community services departments as well as the Tribal Library and Jamestown Family Dental Clinic), the Tribe's Seven Cedars Casino, Longhouse Market Deli and Fueling Station, Cannabis and natural remedies shop, and newly built resort hotel.

In addition to the small parcel of reservation land, the Tribe also owns more than 1,000 acres of land in Clallam and Jefferson Counties. That land includes Railroad Bridge Park and The Cedars at Dungeness Golf Course in Sequim, and Tamanowas Rock, a sacred S'Klallam site in Chimacum.

== Language ==
The S'Klallam language (called Clallam or Klallam) belongs to the Salishan family of Native American languages. The word S'Klallam means "the strong people."

== Tribal government ==
The community is governed by a democratically elected tribal council. As of 2012, the tribe had 594 enrolled citizens, and provided services to almost 640 Indians in the northeast Olympic Peninsula.

=== Mission statement ===
The tribal mission statement reads:

The Jamestown S'Klallam Tribe seeks to be self-sufficient and to provide quality governmental programs and services to address the unique social, cultural, natural resource and economic needs of our people. These programs and services must be managed while preserving, restoring and sustaining our Indian heritage and community continuity.

=== Tribal council ===
The Tribe is governed by the five-member Jamestown S'Klallam Tribal Council. Council members are elected on a staggered basis by the registered adult tribal members for two-year terms. The council acts in accordance with the Jamestown S'Klallam Tribal Constitution and is led by the Tribal Chairman.

== Native American Advocacy ==
On April 4, 2014, the Bureau of Indian Affairs, part of the United States Department of the Interior, approved the Jamestown S'Klallam Tribe leasing regulations under the HEARTH Act after testimony from the Tribal Chairman, W. Ron Allen. With this approval, the Tribe is authorized to enter into the following type of leases without BIA approval: Business leases. This has allowed the tribe to expand their business ventures for the welfare of the members with the prosperity and benefits of a casino, golf course, medical and dental facilities, and other small enterprises.

The Jamestown S'Klallam Tribe is also heavily involved in protecting and preserving their ancestral lands. Their natural resources department works to reach all parts of the diverse Pacific Northwestern ecosystem, but is mainly focused on the Dungeness River watershed. Headed primarily by their Dungeness River Management Team, the tribe has been involved in the completion of over 40 watershed planning documents, studies, and recovery plans since 1989.
