= Klallam language =

Salishan language of North America

Klallam
- nəxʷsƛ̕ay̕əmúcən
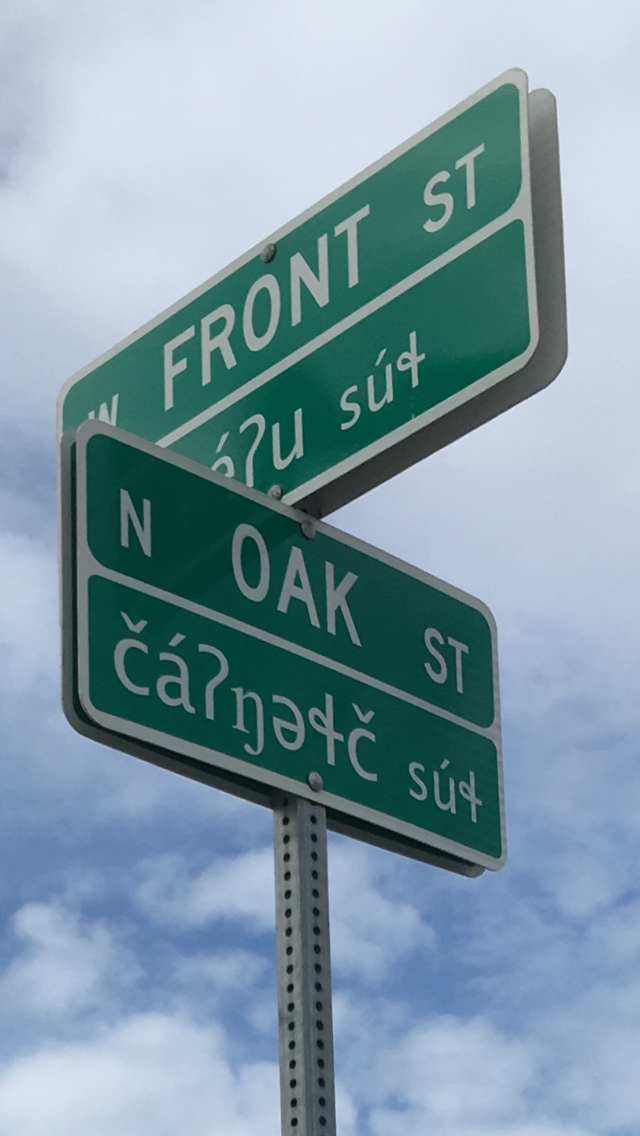
- English-Klallam street signs in Port Angeles
- Pronunciation: /nxʷst͡ɬʼajˀˈmut͡sn/
- Native to: United States
- Region: Washington
- Extinct: 2014, with the death of Hazel Sampson
- Revival: Spoken through youth programs
- Language family: Salishan: Coast; Central; Straits Salish; Klallam
- Dialects: Elwha Klallam; Becher Bay Klallam; Jamestown Klallam; Little Boston Klallam

Language codes
- ISO 639-3: clm
- Glottolog: clal1241
- ELP: Klallam
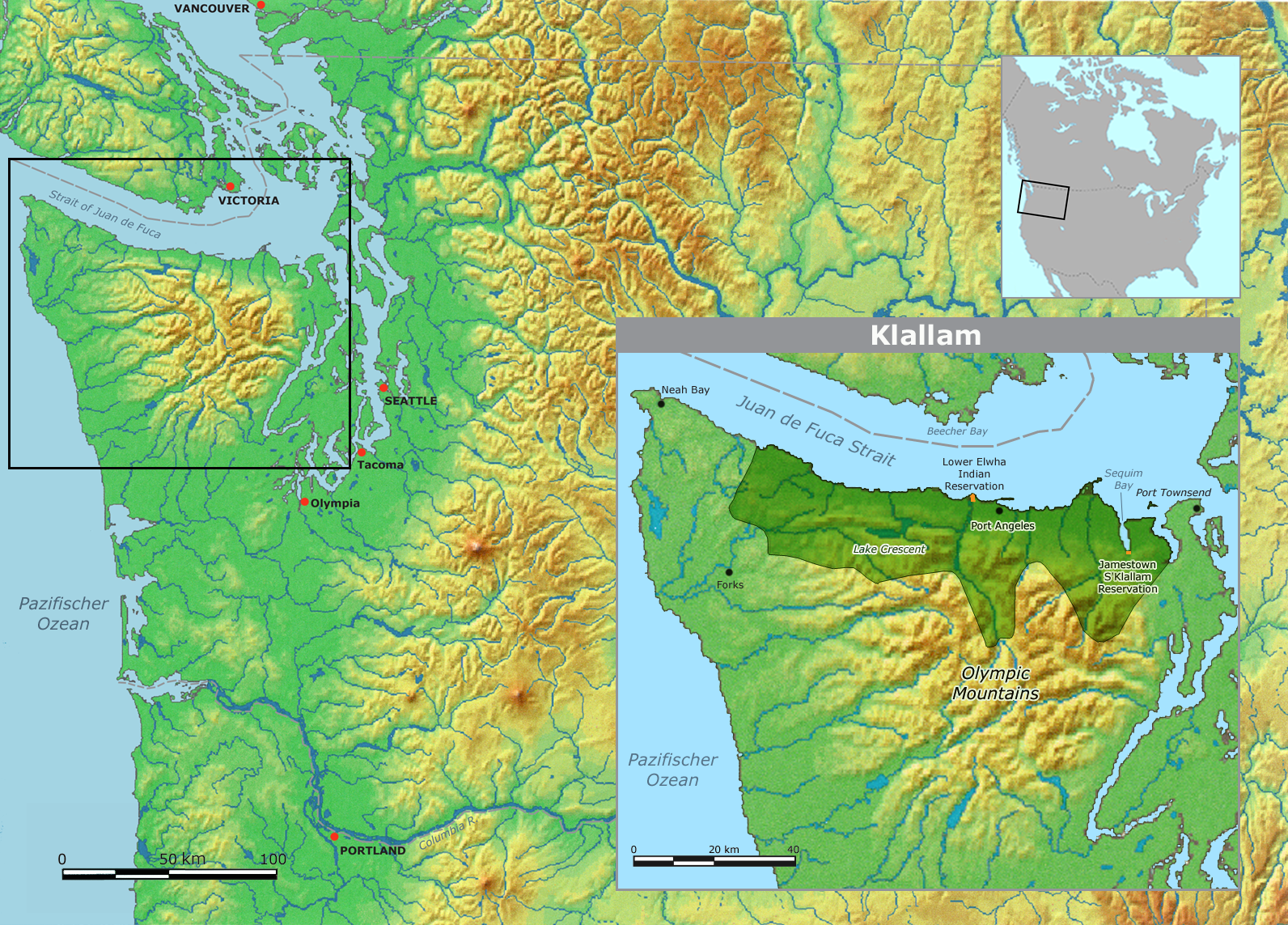
- Pre-contact distribution of the Klallam people and language

- Klallam is classified as Critically Endangered by the UNESCO Atlas of the World's Languages in Danger.

Klallam, also known as Clallam, Ns'Klallam or S'klallam (endonym: nəxʷsƛ̕ay̕əmúcən, pronounced [nxʷst͡ɬʼajˀˈmut͡sn]), is a Salishan language that was historically spoken by the Klallam people at Beecher Bay on Vancouver Island in British Columbia and across the Strait of Juan de Fuca on the north coast of the Olympic Peninsula in Washington. The last native speaker of Klallam as a first language died in 2014, but there is a growing group of speakers of Klallam as a second language.

Klallam is closely related to the Northern Straits Salish dialects, Sooke, Lekwungen, Saanich, Lummi, and Samish, but the languages are not mutually intelligible. There were several dialects of Klallam, including Elwha Klallam, Becher Bay Klallam, Jamestown S'Klallam, and Little Boston S'Klallam.

== Use and revitalization efforts ==
The first Klallam dictionary was published in 2012. Port Angeles High School, in Port Angeles, Washington, offers Klallam classes, taught as a heritage language "to meet graduation and college entrance requirements". Beginning in the fall of 2020, the Klallam language has been taught at Peninsula College in Port Angeles.

The last native speaker of Klallam was Hazel Sampson of Port Angeles, who died on February 4, 2014, at the age of 103. Hazel Sampson had worked along with brother Ed Sampson (d. 1995), Tom Charles (d. 1999), Bea Charles (d. 2009) and Adeline Smith (d. 2013), other native speakers of Klallam, and with language teacher Jamie Valadez and linguist Timothy Montler from 1992 to compile the Klallam Dictionary. In 1999, this effort led to the development of a lesson plan and guidebooks to teach students the basics of the language through storytelling. In 2015, a complete grammar of Klallam was published for second language instruction and preservation of the language.

Bilingual English-Klallam street signs were installed at two intersections in Port Angeles in 2016. In 2020, Donald Sullivan, a member of the Port Gamble S'Klallam Tribe, installed street signs in Klallam alongside existing English ones in Little Boston.

== Phonology ==
=== Vowels ===
Klallam has four phonemic vowels:

	Front	Central	Back
Close	i		u
Mid	(ɛ)	ə	
Open		a	

- /i/ has allophones [e, ɛ] when stressed before /ʔ/, and for some speakers also before /j/, /jˀ/, /ɴ/, or /ɴˀ/. Similarly, a stressed /u/ becomes [o] before /ʔ/, and for some, also before /j/ or /jˀ/ (but not before /w/ or /wˀ/). The former is indicated in the traditional orthography, but the latter is not.
- When unstressed, /ə/ can be pronounced as [ʌ, ɪ, ʊ, ɑ] in the following environments:
  - Before ʔ or h, it becomes [ɑ].
  - Around č and š, it becomes [ɪ].
  - Before rounded dorsal consonants, it becomes [ʊ].
- Vowels may be stressed or unstressed. Unstressed vowels are shorter and lower in intensity than are stressed vowels.
  - Unstressed schwas are often deleted. For example, nətán ('my mother') is usually pronounced as ntán.
  - In the case of schwa deletion after a nasal consonant that is immediately after the stressed vowel, the nasal consonant is often geminated. For example, čánəs ('to move something') is pronounced as čánns even in very careful speech.

=== Consonants ===
The 36 consonants of Klallam written in the International Phonetic Alphabet, with its orthography in brackets where different:

		Bilabial	Alveolar			Palatal (-alveolar)	Velar		Uvular		Glottal
		Bilabial	plain	sibilant	lateral	Palatal (-alveolar)	plain	labial	plain	labial	Glottal
Plosive	plain	p	t	t͡s ⟨c⟩		t͡ʃ ⟨č⟩	k (Note: /k/ occurs in only a few loanwords, mostly from Chinook Jargon, English, or French.)	kʷ	q	qʷ	ʔ
Plosive	ejective	pʼ	tʼ	t͡sʼ ⟨c̕⟩	t͡ɬʼ ⟨ƛ̕⟩	t͡ʃʼ ⟨č̕⟩		kʷʼ ⟨k̕ʷ⟩	qʼ	qʷʼ ⟨q̕ʷ⟩	ʔ
Fricative				s	ɬ	ʃ ⟨š⟩		xʷ	χ ⟨x̣⟩	χʷ ⟨x̣ʷ⟩	h
Sonorant	plain	m	n		l (Note: /l/ rarely occurs in Klallam. It often replaces rhotics in loanwords from Chinook Jargon, French, and English (whether it occurs in native words is possibly a matter of debate).)	j ⟨y⟩		w	ɴ ⟨ŋ⟩		
Sonorant	glottalic	mˀ ⟨m̕⟩	nˀ ⟨n̕⟩			jˀ ⟨y̕⟩		wˀ ⟨w̕⟩	ɴˀ ⟨ŋ̕⟩		

- Glottalized sonorants /mˀ/, /nˀ/, /ɴˀ/, /jˀ/, /wˀ/ are realized either

1. with creaky voice: [m̰], [n̰], [ɴ̰], [j̰], [w̰],
2. as decomposed glottal stop + sonorant: [ʔm], [ʔn], [ʔɴ], [ʔj], [ʔw], or
3. as decomposed sonorant + glottal stop: [mʔ], [nʔ], [ɴʔ], [jʔ], [wʔ]

- The alveolar affricate /t͡s/ contrasts with a sequence of stop + fricative /ts/. The same goes for other affricates.
- Doubled non-glottal stops and affricates are pronounced as two separate sounds, but doubled sonorants, /ʔ/, and fricatives are geminated.

=== Syllable structure ===
In Klallam, consonant clusters occur at both the beginning and the end of syllables. In the onset, consonant clusters are rather unstructured and so words like ɬq̕čšɬšáʔ ("fifty") exist with no problem. Similarly, codas can contain similar consonant clusters, as in sx̣áʔəstxʷ ('to dislike something'), wherein the unstressed schwa is dropped, creating a [ʔstxʷ] cluster.

=== Stress ===
Stress in Klallam defines the quality of the vowel in any given syllable and can occur only once in a word. Unstressed vowels are often reduced to schwa, which is indicated in the orthography. In turn, unstressed schwas are deleted. Mark Fleischer (1976) argues that schwa may be the only underlying vowel and considers that all of the others can be derived from the environment.

Stress often falls on the penultimate syllable; however, some affixes attract stress, and some words do not follow that pattern. Additionally, not all words can have stress.

== Morphology ==
=== Affixation ===
Klallam is a polysynthetic language, like the other Salishan languages. Affixes are common for both verbs and nouns and provide temporal, case, and aspectual information. Every word contains at least one root. For example, the Klallam word ʔəsxʷaʔnáʔyaʔŋəs ('smiling') includes prefixes, suffixes, and an infix. In its component parts, ʔəs-xʷ-naʔnáʔ-yaʔ-ŋ-əs means 'be in a state of small laughing on the face' or, more simply, 'smiling'. There are many forms of prefix, suffix, and infix; allomorphy is common, and a single affix often has multiple phonetic realizations because of the stress structure or the phonology of the word to which it is being added.

==== Prefixes ====
A common form of prefix is the time prefix. It can be added to nouns, adjectives, and verbs to project ideas of time into the root's meaning. Examples are kwɬ- ('already'), twaw̓ ('still'), čaʔ ('just now'), and txʷ- ('first', 'for a while'). Other prefixes add verbal semantics with meanings such as 'have', 'go to', 'go from', and 'be affected by'.

==== Suffixes ====
Klallam has lexical suffixes, which are unique to the languages of northwestern North America. They have inherently noun-like meanings and can function as the object of a verb, create a compound meaning, and act as the object of a number word. Many refer to body parts, but almost 100 lexical suffixes cover a number of different ideas. The suffixes can often take on a metaphorically-extended meaning and so "nose" can be used to refer also to a single point, and "mouth" can also mean "language." Here are examples of common lexical suffixes with alternate pronunciation in parentheses. Alternate pronunciations usually depend on the location of the stress in the root.

- -ákʷtxʷ (-aʔítxʷ) – "dollar," "round object"
- -áw̓txʷ – "house," "building," "room"
- -áy – "people"
- -éʔqʷ – "head"
- -íkʷs (-íkʷən) – "body", "of a kind"
- -tən (-ən) – "instrument," "tool"
- -ucən (-cən, -cín, -úc) – "mouth," "edge," "language"

There are also activity suffixes that give more information about an activity, such as "structured" with -ayu and -ay̓s, "customary," with -iŋəɬ, and "habitual" with -ənəq.

==== Infixes ====
Plurality can be marked with an infix but also by many other ways. The infix marks collective plurality and so instead of strictly marking multiple of a noun, it creates a group of the noun. The infix takes one of the forms -əy̓-, -aʔy-, -éy-, or -éye-, depending on the root structure and the stress placement before it.

=== Reduplication ===
There are multiple forms of reduplication in Klallam, and each lends a particular meaning to the word. Two-consonant reduplication is a way to express plurality in about 10% of Kallam words. The first two consonants are copied and inserted before their location in the stem, and a schwa is inserted between them. For example, ləmətú ("sheep") becomes ləmləmətú ("many sheep") through this process. First-letter reduplication is one of three ways to create a continuative verb form. The first consonant of a word is then inserted after the first vowel, sometimes with a schwa later added: qán̓ cn ("I steal") becomes qáqən̓ cn ("I am stealing").

To create a diminutive form, the first consonant is reduplicated with an additional suffix' of -aʔ afterwards and an infix of -ʔ- later in the word, which may be replaced by glottalization. Then, músmes ("cow") becomes maʔmúʔsməs ("little cow," "calf"). The diminutive is not limited to noun forms. When used with a verb, the meaning takes on the characteristic of "just a little" or "by a small thing." With an adjective, the meaning is construed to a lesser extent than the original form. Other forms of reduplication exist with meanings of "characteristic," "inceptive," and "affective" aspects.

== Syntax ==
Klallam typical has a word order that is VSO, but if the subject of the verb is obvious, the object and the subject may be in any order. Thus, VOS is a very frequent alternative structure. In addition a sentence that simply could not work with the subject and object's roles swapped, the subject is considered obvious when both participants are human and one possesses the other. For example, in kʷənáŋəts cə swéʔwəs cə táns ("The boy helped his mother," literally "helped the boy his mother"), the mother is possessed by the boy and therefore cannot be the subject. In that case, the sentence could also be written as kʷənáŋəts cə táns cə swéʔwəs, inverting the object and the subject. An adjective that is involved in a noun phrase comes before the noun that it describes.

After the first verb, either the main verb or an auxiliary verb, often there are one or more enclitic particles, which can indicated tense and a variety of moods and evidentials.

=== Case system ===
In main clauses, Klallam uses an ergative-absolutive pattern to mark the third person. The first and the second persons in the main clause, however, as well as all persons in subordinate clauses, follow a nominative-accusative pattern.

Verbs are intransitive unless marked with one of several transitivizing suffixes. The suffix -t on a verb indicates control by the actor. For example, in c̕áʔkʷ cn ʔaʔ cə nətán ("I got washed by my mother"), the root is unmarked, the subject cn is a patient, and the agent is the object of the oblique preposition ʔaʔ. However, in c̕áʔkʷt cn cə nəŋənaʔ ("I washed my child"), the -t transitive suffix marks that the agent subject and the cn is in control of the action. In a similar manner, the transitivizer -nəxʷ indicates a lack of control or a sense of "finally" or "manage to" since whether they will succeed is out of the subject's control.

The suffix -əŋ on a transitivized verb creates a passive construction. For example, c̕áʔkʷtəŋ cn ʔaʔ cə nəŋə́naʔ ("I was washed by my child"). There is additionally a middle voice in which the suffix -əŋ on an intransitive stem creates an antipassive construction, indicating an agent subject. If no patient is mentioned in the middle voice, the patient and the agent are assumed to be the same, as in an action being done to oneself. For example, c̕áʔkʷəŋ cn would usually be taken to mean "I washed myself" but is subject to some ambiguity, as it could also mean "I washed (regularly)" or "I did some washing."

== Bibliography ==
- Brooks, Pamela (1997). "John P. Harrington's Klallam and Chemakum place names". Proceedings of the International Conference on Salish and Neighboring Languages. Vol. 32. pp. 144–188.
- Fleisher, Mark (1976). Clallam: A study in Coast Salish ethnolinguistics (Doctoral dissertation). Washington State University.
- Fleisher, Mark (1977). "Aspects of Clallam phonology and their implication of reconstruction". Proceedings of the International Conference on Salishan Languages. Vol. 12. pp. 132–141.
- Mithun, Marianne (1999). The languages of Native North America. Cambridge: Cambridge University Press. ISBN 0-521-23228-7. ISBN 0-521-29875-X (pbk).
- Montler, Timothy (1996). "Languages and dialects in Straits Salishan". Proceedings of the International Conference on Salish and Neighboring Languages. Vol. 31. pp. 249–256.
- Montler, Timothy (1996). "Some Klallam paradigms". Proceedings of the International Conference on Salish and Neighboring Languages. Vol. 31. pp. 257–264.
- Montler, Timothy (1998). "The major processes affecting Klallam vowels". Proceedings of the International Conference on Salish and Neighboring Languages. Vol. 33. pp. 366–373.
- Montler, Timothy (1999). "Language and dialect variation in Straits Salishan". Anthropological Linguistics. 41 (4): 462–502.
- Montler, Timothy (2005), Personal communication
- Montler, Timothy (2012). Klallam Dictionary. Seattle: University of Washington Press.
- Montler, Timothy (2015). Klallam Grammar. Seattle: University of Washington Press.
- Thompson, Laurence; Thompson, M. Terry (1969). "Metathesis as a grammatical device". International Journal of American Linguistics. 35: 213–219.
- Thompson, Laurence; Thompson, M. Terry (1971). "Clallam: A preview". University of California Publications in Linguistics. 65: 251–294.
- Thompson, Laurence; Thompson, M. Terry; Efrat, Barbara (1974). "Some phonological developments in Straits Salish". International Journal of American Linguistics. 40: 182–196.
