= Klallam people =

Coast Salish ethnic group

Klallam
nəxʷsƛ̕áy̕əm̕
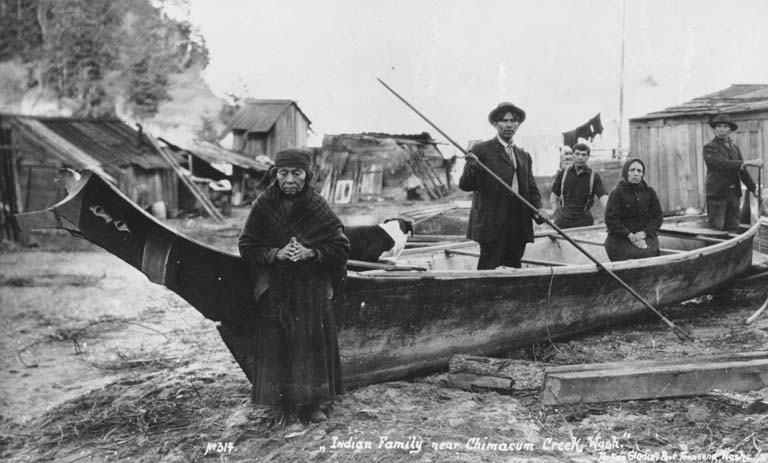
- Hicks family (Klallam) pose with canoe near Chimacum Creek, Washington, ca. 1914

Regions with significant populations
- Canada (British Columbia); United States (Washington)

Languages
- Klallam, English

Related ethnic groups
- other Coast Salish peoples

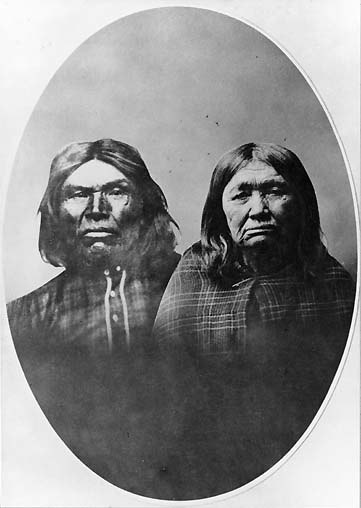
Klallam chief Chitsamanhan and his wife, ca. 1884

The Klallam (Klallam: nəxʷsƛ̕áy̕əm̕; also known as the S'Klallam or Clallam) are a Coast Salish people Indigenous to the northern Olympic Peninsula. The language of the Klallam is the Klallam language (Klallam: nəxʷsƛ̕ay̕əmúcən), a language closely related to the North Straits Salish languages. The Klallam are today citizens of four recognized bands: Three federally-recognized tribes in the United States and one band government in Canada. Two Klallam tribes, the Jamestown S'Klallam and Lower Elwha Klallam, live on the Olympic Peninsula, and one, the Port Gamble S'Klallam, on the Kitsap Peninsula in Washington state. In Canada, the Scia'new First Nation is based at Becher Bay on southern Vancouver Island in British Columbia.

== Name and etymology ==
The Klallam-language name for the tribe is nəxʷsƛ̕áy̕əm̕ (meaning "strong people"). According to the oral history of the Klallam, the name was earned after the tribe won a challenge around hoisting a log onto a house. They put the log in the water, and then floated it onto their shoulders. When they came back with the log, other tribes started cheering "strong people".

There exists a wide variety of English spellings including "Chalam", "Clalam", "Clallem", "Clallum", "Khalam", "Klalam", "Noodsdalum", "Nooselalum", "Noostlalum", "Tlalum", "Tlalam", "Wooselalim", "S'Klallam", "Ns'Klallam", "Klallam" and "Clallam". "Clallam" was used by the Washington Territory legislature in 1854 when it created Clallam County. The following year "S'klallam" was used in the Point No Point Treaty. In the following decades the simpler "Klallam" or "Clallam" predominated in the media and research literature. In 1981 "S'Klallam" was used when the United States Department of the Interior officially recognized the Lower Elwha, Jamestown, and Port Gamble (or Little Boston) tribes.

In local media today "Clallam" is usually used to refer to Clallam County, Washington. It is also used in the names of a number of non-native commercial enterprises. The spellings with 'K' are used to refer to the native peoples. The Lower Elwha tribe has adopted "Klallam" as its official spelling. The Port Gamble and Jamestown tribes have adopted "S'Klallam" as their official spelling.

== History ==
=== Pre-Contact ===
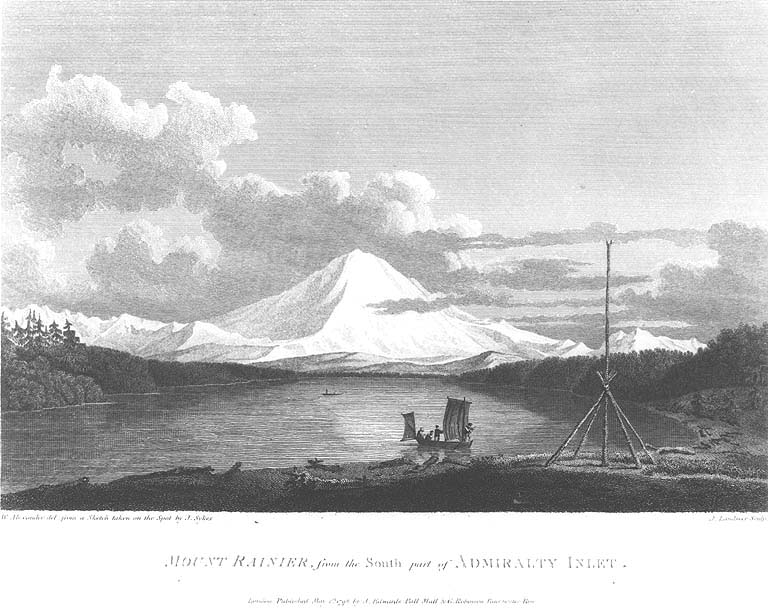
Klallam pole for netting ducks, Mount Rainier as seen from Admiralty Inlet, in engraving made in 1792 by John Sykes

Before the arrival of Europeans to the Pacific Northwest the territory inhabited by the Klallam stretched across the north coast of the Olympic Peninsula from the mouth of the Hoko River on the west to Port Discovery Bay on the east. There were also some Klallam living across the Strait of Juan de Fuca on Vancouver Island, in or near today's Saanich, Sooke, and Beecher Bay. Klallam villages were mostly located along the coast, while some villages were inland along rivers, inlets or large lakes.

Based on early interviews of tribal elders by early ethnologists and anthropologists, the estimated number of Klallam villages has ranged from ten to over thirty, with some ambiguity in distinguishing permanent from seasonal settlements, and some villages with mixed or disputed tribal identity.

While language and tradition united the Klallam people, there were extensive trade, inter-marriage, and other forms of cooperation between the Klallam and surrounding tribes.

Like many other indigenous peoples of the Pacific Northwest coast, the Klallam held potlatches, which played a large role in determining social status.

=== Post-Contact ===
Europeans first began to explore the Pacific Northwest coast with Juan Pérez in 1774, James Cook in 1778, and many others, especially maritime fur traders, from the 1780s on. Early explorers did not enter the Strait of Juan de Fuca or make direct contact with the Klallam. By the time direct contact was made, sometime before 1789, the Klallam had already heard about the European newcomers. Charles William Barkley was the first European known to have entered the Strait of Juan de Fuca, in 1787. Robert Gray reached Clallam Bay in 1789. From 1790 to 1792 the Spanish, based at Nootka Sound on Vancouver Island, made multiple expeditions into the Strait of Juan de Fuca. Manuel Quimper reached Port Discovery Bay in 1790. In 1791 Francisco de Eliza led a small exploring fleet, which for a time based itself at Port Discovery. It is not known which ship first made contact with the Klallam, but it was most likely before 1789 and probably at the village at Clallam Bay or Port Discovery, and involved gifts of knives, buttons, and copper. George Vancouver made contact with the Klallam in 1792. He thought he was the first European to visit them and wrote about their indifference, which surprised him. He traded them copper, knives, and minor trade goods.

In 1825 the Hudson's Bay Company (HBC) established Fort Vancouver on the Columbia River. There was little traffic between the Klallam and the fort. The only serious incident between the two occurred in 1828 when five white men were killed by a number of Klallam, two of which had been serving as guides and had been mistreated by the white men. In response a party of about 60 men from Fort Vancouver visited Klallam territory and attacked the first group they found, killing seven including women and children, and burning their house. Then, with the help of an HBC ship they attacked, plundered, and destroyed a Klallam village near Dungeness Spit. HBC records say they killed 25 Klallam altogether.

In 1832 the HBC trading post Fort Nisqually was established on the southern shore of Puget Sound, in what is the city of DuPont today. Fort records indicate that Klallam were visiting to trade furs and game by 1833. Between 1833 and 1835 Klallam parties visited Fort Nisqually at least nine times, and more regularly in the following decade. During the same period an HBC trading party visited Klallam territory. This party found the Klallam mostly unwilling to sell furs, saying the HBC's prices were too low and that they would instead wait for some other, more competitive trader.

Paul Kane visited Fort Nisqually and the larger region in 1847. His descriptions of the Klallam indicate that they still practiced slavery, had given up bows and arrows for guns, that duck netting was common, shell money was still valued, and shamanism still practiced. One village he visited was fortified and inhabited by about 200 Klallam.

In 1847 about 150 Klallam warriors joined with Suquamish led by Chief Seattle in a major attack on the Chimakum people, intending to wipe them out completely. They largely succeeded, destroying the last Chimakum villages and leaving nearly everyone dead or enslaved. The few surviving Chimakum fled and subsequently joined the Twana, or Skokomish, near the southern end of Hood Canal. After this the Klallam occupied the former Chimakum territory, which was the northeastern part of the Olympic Peninsula, especially on the Quimper Peninsula, where Port Townsend is today, and along northern Hood Canal.

The first white settler of Port Townsend arrived in 1850. That same year the Klallam chief Chetzemoka, known as the Duke of York—many Klallam were given royal names by whites who had difficulty pronouncing Klallam names—was taken by a ship captain on a visit to San Francisco, returning very impressed. In the early 1850s many settlers came to Port Townsend and elsewhere in the region. By 1853 there were sawmills operating at Port Townsend, Port Gamble, and Port Ludlow. A small settlement was established in Klallam territory near Dungeness Spit and present-day Sequim. These early settlers, who lived in conditions little better, or worse than the Klallam, began selling large amounts of liquor to the Klallam, which quickly had deleterious effects.

The ethnologist George Gibbs visited the Klallam in 1855. He reported their population as 926 and blamed alcohol and disease for their population decline. Although his count was probably too low, the Klallam population was significantly reduced from earlier times, mostly due to alcohol and disease. According to Gibbs, the Klallam regularly raided their neighbors but had almost completely stopped using clubs and bows. The Klallam had many tools and utensils of European manufacture. They were growing potatoes in cultivated fields. The fur trade, formerly vital, was almost extinct. Slavery and potlatching were still practiced.

In 1855 the Klallam, along with the Skokomish and the surviving Chimakum, signed the Point No Point Treaty. Under the treaty the Klallam were supposed to give up their land and move to the Skokomish Reservation, near today's Skokomish, Washington, in exchange for government aid in the form of rations and instruction. However the Klallam never made this move and remained in their territory along the northern coast of the Olympic Peninsula.

Clallam County was established in 1854, but its population and infrastructure remained minimal for decades. Around 1860 there was smallpox among the Klallam, but it is not known how serious it was. The last act of intertribal warfare involving the Klallam occurred in 1869. A band of over thirty Tsimshian, men, women, and children, were killed on Dungeness Spit by a group of about twenty Klallam men. One Tsimshian woman survived by pretending to be dead. The attack was in retaliation for the abduction of some Klallam women by the Tsimshian a few years earlier. Before the attack the Klallam debated over how the white settlers would react, but after some hesitation the attack was carried out in the traditional manner. One Klallam man was killed, which led to arguments among the Klallam who in the end threw away their trophies and went home dejected. A few were arrested by white settlers and sentenced to hard labor at the Skokomish Reservation, but they were not held for long and the punishment was generally considered to have been mild.

After Gibbs's questionable census of 1855, which counted 926 Klallam, somewhat better censuses were conducted in the 1860s and 1870s. It appears that from initial contact to about 1862 the Klallam population declined but not too severely. Between 1862 and 1878 a more rapid decline occurred—from about 1,300 to 597. By 1870 most Klallam lived near Dungeness Spit and what is now Sequim. The period around 1870 marked what appears to be the lowest point in Klallam history. Due to rampant alcoholism, petty bickering and fighting, and thievery, the white residents of Dungeness forced them to relocate to other nearby areas twice, and then threatened to have them moved to the Skokomish Reservation. This led to Chief James Balch, who had been a heavy drinker until his reform in 1873, to lead the Klallam in purchasing their own land and create their own community. He and other leading Klallam collected enough money to purchase a parcel of 250 acres, in 1874, and found a town they named Jamestown, after James Balch. This was very unusual for the time, not least because Native people were legally barred from buying land at the time. By doing this and not moving to the Skokomish Reservation they gave up the possibility of federal assistance of any kind. For many decades Jamestown was one of the few examples of a Native settlement fully owned and managed by the native people themselves, with no governmental assistance or oversight.

In 1981, over a century later, and after six years of effort to gain official recognition as a tribe, the federal government agreed, resulting in the federally recognized Jamestown S'Klallam Tribe of Washington. Some Klallam never joined the Jamestown project. Today there are several other Klallam groups, such as the Lower Elwha Klallam Tribe, the Port Gamble S'Klallam Tribe, and, in Canada, the Scia'new First Nation.

== Culture ==
=== Transportation ===
The rugged terrain and dense vegetation of the Olympic Peninsula made the canoe the preferred mode of transportation. The canoes were carved from western red cedar (Thuja plicata) through an intricate and arduous process requiring great skill, beginning with the selection of the proper tree. Stone adzes, fire, and heated water were used to hollow and shape the canoe. This knowledge was passed to a select few of each generation, and some of the canoes were purchased from other tribes, especially the larger ones.

There were two main types of canoes used by the Klallam: The smaller Coast Salish type used on protected waters, and the larger Chinook style for use in rougher waters. The smaller type of canoe had a rounded bottom and was 12–30 feet (4–9 m) long, 20–48 inches (50–120 cm) wide, and 9–20 inches (20–50 cm) deep. This type was used on calm waters for fishing or to haul small loads. The larger canoes had flat bottoms and could be over 30 feet (10 m) long, 6 feet (200 cm) wide, and 3 feet (100 cm) deep. These were used on the rougher waters of Puget Sound, the Strait of Juan de Fuca, and in particular off the Pacific coast, for whaling, transporting larger loads, and carrying up to thirty passengers.

Early white settlers in the area noted the great skill the Klallam used in canoe handling and navigation, and that the Klallam canoes tended to be larger than those used by other Puget Sound tribes.

=== Diet ===
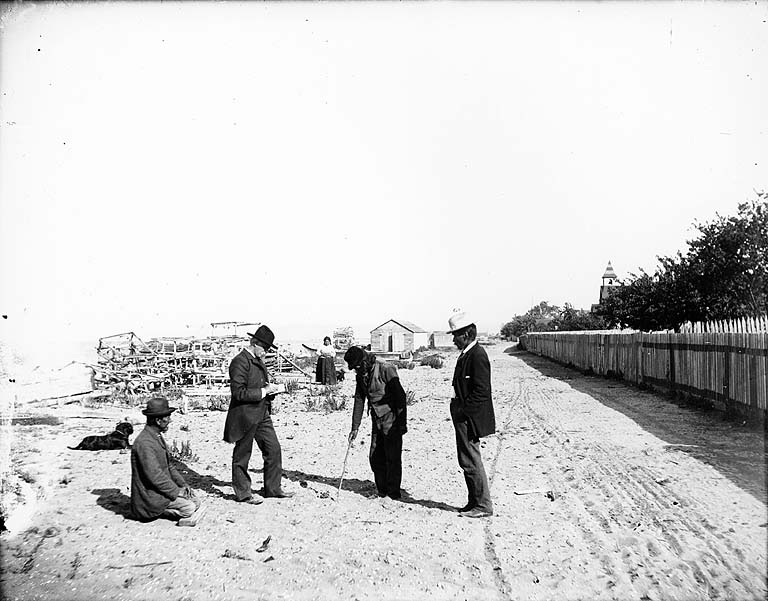
Klallam men on beach with the Shaker church in the background, Jamestown, Washington, ca. 1903

The lands, rivers, marine waters, and beaches in Klallam territory provided an abundant, year-round supply of food. Strategic intertribal marriages and agreements also allowed them permission to hunt or forage outside their homeland. Though their diet included large and small land game, sea fowl, and shellfish, the most important source of food was fish. Salmon still plays a significant nutritional and spiritual role in the Klallam culture.

The Klallam fished year round using a variety of tools and techniques particular to the species, location, and season. They were known to use traps, trolling, gillnets, spears, rakes, dip nets, and holes dug in the beach. Specific locations were known to produce certain fishes at the right time of year, and special implements and skills were employed for a successful catch.

=== Ethnobotany ===
They apply a poultice of the smashed flowers of Viola adunca to the chest or side for pain.

== Tribal groups ==
- Lower Elwha Tribal Community of the Lower Elwha Reservation, Washington
- Jamestown S'Klallam Tribe of Washington
- Port Gamble Indian Community of the Port Gamble Reservation, Washington
- Scia'new First Nation (Becher Bay Indian Band), Vancouver Island, British Columbia

== Schools ==
The Klallam tribes do not operate their own schools.

Lower Elwha Klallam children are offered a Klallam cultural and language immersion program at the Lower Elwha Klallam Head Start. Older children are provided with Klallam language and tribal history courses at Dry Creek Elementary School, Stevens Middle School and Port Angeles High School, where most Lower Elwha Klallam children attend school.

A majority of Jamestown S'Klallam children attend Sequim School District schools.

A majority of Port Gamble S'Klallam children attend schools in the North Kitsap School District in the Kingston area.

== See also ==
- Tse-whit-zen, an ancient Klallam village unearthed in 2004 in Port Angeles, Washington
- Coast Salish
- Clallam (steamboat)
