= Lower Elwha Klallam Tribe =

Federally recognized Indian tribe in Washington State

Lower Elwha Klallam Tribe ʔéʔɬx̣ʷaʔ nəxʷsƛ̕áy̕əm̕ (Klallam)
- Location of the Lower Elwha Reservation in Washington
- Headquarters: Port Angeles
- Languages: Klallam, English
- Demonym: Lower Elwha Klallam
- Tribal citizens: 776 (2007)

Domestic dependent nation within the United States
- Website elwha.org

The Lower Elwha Klallam Tribe (Klallam: ʔéʔɬx̣ʷaʔ nəxʷsƛ̕áy̕əm̕) is a federally recognized tribe of Klallam people located in Washington state.

The traditional territory of the Klallam is the north and northeast portion of the Olympic Peninsula, in the U.S. state of Washington. They traditionally had several villages in this area. Since the 1930s part of the tribe has controlled a reservation located four miles (6.4 km) west of Port Angeles at the mouth of the Elwha River.

In August 2003 the site of an ancient Klallam village, Tse-whit-zen, was discovered during a construction project on former tribal land in the city. The significance of the nearly intact village site, hundreds of human remains, and thousands of artifacts led to the state abandoning the construction project at that site. Based on radiocarbon dating, the village site appears to have been occupied for nearly 2700 years. The Lower Elwha Klallam lived there until the 1930s, when the federal government persuaded them to move outside the city to a reservation four miles (6.4 km) west. The state has since returned 10 acres (4.0 ha) of land to the Tribe and leased it another six acres (2.4 ha).

In 2012 and 2014, two dams built in the early 20th century were removed from the Elwha River as part of a major restoration project long advocated by the Tribe. This will enable the building up of the beaches and delta at the mouth of the river, as well as restore salmon runs and improve the ecology of the river and watershed. As lands were revealed, in August 2012 the tribe rediscovered their long-submerged sacred creation site near the river. In addition, an archeological site has been found along the river with artifacts revealing 8,000 years of human habitation; it is the oldest site in the Olympic National Park.

== History ==
=== Background ===
The Lower Elwha Klallam Tribe is one of the three federally recognized Klallam tribes in the United States. Their historic territory was in the northeast of the Olympic Peninsula, approximately from the Hoko River to the Strait of Juan de Fuca.

In historic and ancient times, the Lower Elwha Klallam occupied several villages along the Elwha River, including on the bay sheltered by Ediz Hook, the area of present-day Port Angeles. They claimed a rock along the river as their creation site, calling it a word that in Klallam means coiled basket, for its shape. This was known as the place where the Creator "bathed and blessed the Klallam people and other tribes," according to Jamie Valadez, a Klallam language instructor. It was known as a place for vision quests. This site was submerged under a lake created by construction of the Elwha Dam in 1913. Tribal members recounted it to anthropologists and other researchers in the early 20th century.

In the late 18th and 19th centuries, the Tribe suffered high fatalities from infectious diseases carried from European traders, as they had no immunity to these new diseases, such as smallpox and measles. Their numbers were markedly reduced by the late 19th century.

=== Point No Point Treaty ===
The Lower Elwha Klallam Tribe was recognized by the United States in the 1855 Point No Point Treaty. In the 20th century, the federal government bought land outside Port Angeles and persuaded the tribe to relocate there in 1935–36 from their property in the city, to allow for industrial development along the waterfront. Lumber and paper mills were built over tribal land. In 1968 the land at the mouth of the Elwha River was designated as the Lower Elwha Reservation. Today tribal lands include about one thousand acres (4 km^{2}) of land on and near the Elwha River.

In 1938 the Olympic National Park was established to protect the upper Elwha and other rivers, mountains, and other areas of the northern Olympic Peninsula. This has preserved important habitat but dams built on the lower river in the early 20th century altered the ecology by preventing the annual salmon runs. By the late 20th century, the number of salmon returning to the river had dropped from nearly 400,000 to less than 4,000.

=== Fight for treaty rights ===
The Tribe collaborated with others in the Pacific Northwest in pressing its treaty rights, including to traditional fishing. They long depended on salmon for a major part of their diet. Salmon runs on the Elwha River had been sharply reduced due to the barriers of two dams constructed in the early 20th century, and the Tribe sought their share of salmon and other fish. By the Boldt Decision of 1979, the tribes' treaty rights were affirmed and they were granted half the salmon runs. An annual process of consultation and negotiation over fishing has developed in collaboration with the National Marine Fisheries Service of NOAA, and commercial and sports fishermen, to maintain sustainable fisheries.

=== Restoration of the Elwha River ===
From the beginning, the Tribe opposed the dams on the Elwha, and increasingly as their negative environmental effects became obvious. Removal of the dams was supported as the only way to restore the salmon fisheries in the upper Elwha River. The Tribe worked with national and regional environmental groups to lobby state representatives and Congress, ultimately gaining passage of the 1992 Elwha River Ecosystem and Fisheries Restoration Act. This has been the largest restoration project undertaken by the National Park Service after the Restoration of the Everglades and the Tribe has been one of the stakeholders consulted in its development and implementation. Removal of the dams began in 2011 and was completed in August 2014.

=== Archaeology ===
In August 2003, the Tribe's ancient village of Tse-whit-zen was rediscovered during construction of a graving dock in Port Angeles by the Washington State Department of Transportation (WSDOT). This project was for building pontoons for the replacement of the Hood Canal Bridge. The Tribe and WSDOT initially collaborated on exploring the artifacts but, with the discovery of 10,000 artifacts and 335 human remains, and recognition that the site was nearly intact, the Tribe demanded that the construction project be abandoned. On December 21, 2004, the state governor announced that WSDOT would halt all construction efforts relating to the graving dock at that site.

In a later settlement of the suit brought by the tribe, the state gave 10 acres (4.0 ha) of land of the village site to the Lower Elwha Klallam Tribe for reburial of remains, and agreed to WSDOT leasing another six acres (2.4 ha) to the Tribe for a structure to curate the 67,000 artifacts recovered from the village site from 2003 to 2005. The settlement provided a payment of $2.5 million by the state to the Tribe, and $7.5 million each to the city of Port Angeles and the Port of Port Angeles due to abandonment of the construction project. As of 2012, certain terms of the agreement, intended to prevent construction or operation of gaming casinos on the site, were delaying the federal government's taking this land into trust for the Tribe. This would enable their control of the land. The Tribe intends to build a museum or curation center at this site.

According to radiocarbon dating, the village of Tse-whit-zen dates back over 2,700 years. It was occupied by the Tribe into the early 1930s, when they relocated to new reservation land. The ground was filled and a number of mills were built on top of the village site during the 20th century. Because the ground was covered with 15 to 30 feet (4.6 to 9.1 m) of fill, the village site was preserved. Archaeology has revealed the evidence of possibly eight longhouse structures, as well as areas for food preparation and ceremonies, and the cemetery.

In August 2012, Tribal members rediscovered their sacred creation site along the Elwha River. It was revealed after Lake Aldwell, the reservoir created by the Elwha Dam, was drained as part of the Restoration of the Elwha River Project. Some members journeyed to the sacred site, where they gathered water to take back to elders who could not get there, including Adeline Smith. It was the first time living members of the tribe had ever seen this site.

In a related find on formerly submerged land, archeologists discovered a site that revealed 8,000 years of human habitation. It is the oldest archeological site within the Olympic National Park. In consultation with the Tribe, researchers removed some artifacts for study, and reburied the site to protect it. Both locations are being kept secret to preserve them.

== Lower Elwha Reservation ==
The Lower Elwha Klallam Tribe governs the Lower Elwha Reservation, primarily located near the Elwha River.

== Demographics ==
As of 2007 there are 776 enrolled members of the Lower Elwha Klallam Tribe. Of these, 112 live on the Lower Elwha Reservation. This is managed by the tribe and located at the mouth of the Elwha River, 48°8′19″N 123°33′11″W, about 4 miles (6.4 km) west of Port Angeles.

== Culture ==
The tribe traditionally spoke the Klallam language, a Coast Salish language. In projects already underway, a Klallam dictionary was published in 2012, with major contributions by tribal elders such as Adeline Smith. Language classes are reviving use of Klallam.

== Notable Lower Elwha Klallam ==
- Adeline Smith (1918–2013), worked with a noted linguist to develop the Klallam language alphabet and the first Klallam dictionary, published in 2012. She contributed 12,000 words and phrases to the dictionary, becoming its main source. She also was known for supporting preservation of Tse-whit-zen and for encouraging removal of dams from the Elwha River.
- Vanessa Castle (1985), worked on Elwha River Restoration for the Lower Elwha Klallam Tribe Department of Natural Resources from 2019-2024. She was featured in the PBS Nature Series "Wild Hope - The Beautiful Undammed"

== See also ==
- Restoration of the Elwha River
- Tse-whit-zen
- Media related to Lower Elwha Reservation at Wikimedia Commons
