= Port Gamble S'Klallam Tribe =

Port Gamble S'Klallam Tribe nəxʷqíyt nəxʷsƛ̕áy̕əm̕ (Klallam)
- Headquarters: Port Gamble Tribal Community
- Languages: S'Klallam, English
- Demonym: Port Gamble S'Klallam
- Tribal citizens: 1,440 (2024)

Domestic dependent nation within the United States
- Website pgst.nsn.us

Location of the Port Gamble S'Klallam Reservation

The Port Gamble S'Klallam Tribe (Klallam: nəxʷqíyt nəxʷsƛ̕áy̕əm̕), formerly known as the Port Gamble Indian Community of the Port Gamble Reservation or the Port Gamble Band of S'Klallam Indians is a federally recognized tribe of S'Klallam people, located on the Kitsap Peninsula in Washington. They are an Indigenous peoples of the Northwest Coast.

== Reservation ==
The Port Gamble S'Klallam Reservation, located in the northern part of Kitsap County, Washington. It was founded in 1938 and is collectively held by the tribe. The reservation covers 1,303 acres (527 ha). The land is counted by the U.S. Census Bureau as the Port Gamble Tribal Community census-designated place, with an on-site population of 916 as of the 2010 census.

== Government ==
The tribe's headquarters is in Kingston, Washington. The tribe is governed by a democratically elected, six-member tribal council. The current administration is as follows:

- Chairwoman: Amber Caldera
- Vice-Chairman: Chris Tom
- Council Member: Donovan Ashworth
- Council Member: Amber Caldera
- Council Member: Renee Verregge
- Council Member: Matt Ives.

The tribe ratified its constitution in 1939. To enroll in the tribe, members must have a 1/8 minimum blood quantum. However, there is debate on lowering to allow further generations so long as an individual can prove direct descent to a "Treaty Signer."

== Language ==
Traditionally, S'Klallam people speak the S'Klallam language, a Central Salish language. It is very similar to the Saanich dialect of the Straits Salish language. A grammar book has been published in the language, and it is taught in elementary and high school.

== Economic development ==
The Port Gamble S'Klallam Tribe owns and operates the Point Casino, Market Fresh Buffet, Little Boston Bistro, Point Julia Deli, and Heronswood Garden, all located in Kingston.

The tribe also operates a free shuttle connecting the Kingston ferry terminal, Kitsap Transit’s George’s Corner park and ride, the botanical garden, and the casino.
