= Dungeness (disambiguation) =

Dungeness is a headland in Kent, England.

Dungeness may also refer to:

== Places ==
=== Australia ===
- Dungeness, Queensland, a town in the locality of Lucinda in the Shire of Hinchinbrook

=== South America ===
- Punta Dúngeness, a headland in Argentina and Chile at the eastern end of the Straits of Magellan

=== United Kingdom ===
- Dungeness Lighthouse, one of a series of lighthouses built on the headland
- Dungeness nuclear power station, a nuclear power station on the headland
- Dungeness (SER) railway station, closed 1953
- Dungeness railway station, a light railway station on the headland
- Dungeness, Romney Marsh and Rye Bay, the designated Site of Special Scientific Interest (SSSI).
- Battle of Dungeness, a 1652 battle of the First Anglo-Dutch War

=== United States ===
- Dungeness, Washington, an unincorporated community in Washington, U.S.
- Dungeness Spit, a sand spit in Washington, United States, named after Dungeness headland in England
- Dungeness River, in Washington, U.S.
- Dungeness National Wildlife Refuge, in Washington, U.S.
- Dungeness (Cumberland Island, Georgia), a ruined mansion belonging to Thomas M. Carnegie on Cumberland Island, Georgia

== Other ==
- Dungeness crab, a species of crab found from the Aleutian Islands in Alaska to Santa Cruz, California
- Dungeness (album), by Trembling Bells (2018)
