= Blyn, Washington =

- Census-designated place
- Location of Blyn, Washington
- Coordinates: 48°00′45″N 122°59′30″W
- Country: United States
- State: Washington
- County: Clallam

Area
  - Total: 4.9 sq mi (12.7 km^{2})
  - Land: 4.7 sq mi (12.3 km^{2})
  - Water: 0.15 sq mi (0.4 km^{2})
- Elevation: 755 ft (230 m)

Population (2020)
  - Total: 108
  - Density: 22.7/sq mi (8.78/km^{2})
- Time zone: UTC-8 (Pacific (PST))
  - Summer (DST): UTC-7 (PDT)
- ZIP Code: 98382
- Area code: 360, 564
- FIPS code: 53-06855
- GNIS feature ID: 2407871

Blyn is a census-designated place (CDP) in Clallam County, Washington, United States. As of the 2020 census, Blyn had a population of 108. It is located near the city of Sequim on the shores of Sequim Bay. The area includes the Jamestown S'Klallam Indian Reservation, established in 1874 by the Jamestown S'Klallam Tribe, who named their community Jamestown after their leader; Lord James Balch.

== Geography ==
Blyn is located in easternmost Clallam County at the south end of Sequim Bay. U.S. Route 101 passes through the community, leading northwest 6 miles (10 km) to Sequim and east 11 miles (18 km) to the south end of Discovery Bay.

According to the United States Census Bureau, the Blyn CDP has a total area of 4.9 square miles (12.7 km^{2}), of which 4.7 square miles (12.3 km^{2}) is land and 0.2 square miles (0.4 km^{2}), or 3.26%, is water.

== Demographics ==
Historical population
Census	Pop.	Note	%±
2000	162		—
2010	101		−37.7%
2020	108		6.9%
U.S. Decennial Census; 1990 2000 2010

Blyn first appeared as a census designated place in the 2000 U.S. census.

=== Racial and ethnic composition ===
Blyn CDP, Washington – Racial and ethnic composition Note: the US Census treats Hispanic/Latino as an ethnic category. This table excludes Latinos from the racial categories and assigns them to a separate category. Hispanics/Latinos may be of any race.
Race / Ethnicity (NH = Non-Hispanic)	Pop 2000	Pop 2010	Pop 2020	% 2000	% 2010	% 2020
White alone (NH)	146	84	77	90.12%	83.17%	71.30%
Black or African American alone (NH)	0	0	1	0.00%	0.00%	0.93%
Native American or Alaska Native alone (NH)	9	7	9	5.56%	6.93%	8.33%
Asian alone (NH)	1	1	2	0.62%	0.99%	1.85%
Native Hawaiian or Pacific Islander alone (NH)	0	0	0	0.00%	0.00%	0.00%
Other race alone (NH)	0	0	0	0.00%	0.00%	0.00%
Mixed race or Multiracial (NH)	6	1	8	3.70%	0.99%	7.41%
Hispanic or Latino (any race)	0	8	11	0.00%	7.92%	10.19%
Total	162	101	108	100.00%	100.00%	100.00%

=== 2000 census ===
As of the census of 2000, there were 162 people, 68 households, and 36 families residing in the CDP. The population density was 34.0 people per square mile (13.1/km^{2}). There were 92 housing units at an average density of 19.3/sq mi (7.5/km^{2}). The racial makeup of the CDP was 90.12% White, 5.56% Native American, 0.62% Asian, and 3.70% from two or more races.

There were 68 households, out of which 25.0% had children under the age of 18 living with them, 44.1% were married couples living together, 7.4% had a female householder with no husband present, and 45.6% were non-families. 35.3% of all households were made up of individuals, and 14.7% had someone living alone who was 65 years of age or older. The average household size was 2.38 and the average family size was 3.00.

In the CDP the population was spread out, with 25.9% under the age of 18, 3.1% from 18 to 24, 27.2% from 25 to 44, 23.5% from 45 to 64, and 20.4% who were 65 years of age or older. The median age was 42 years. For every 100 females, there were 105.1 males. For every 100 females age 18 and over, there were 110.5 males.

The median income for a household in the CDP was $38,750, and the median income for a family was $53,906. Males had a median income of $25,625 versus $35,833 for females. The per capita income for the CDP was $23,285. None of the families and 3.0% of the population were living below the poverty line.
