= Dungeness School =

- U.S. National Register of Historic Places
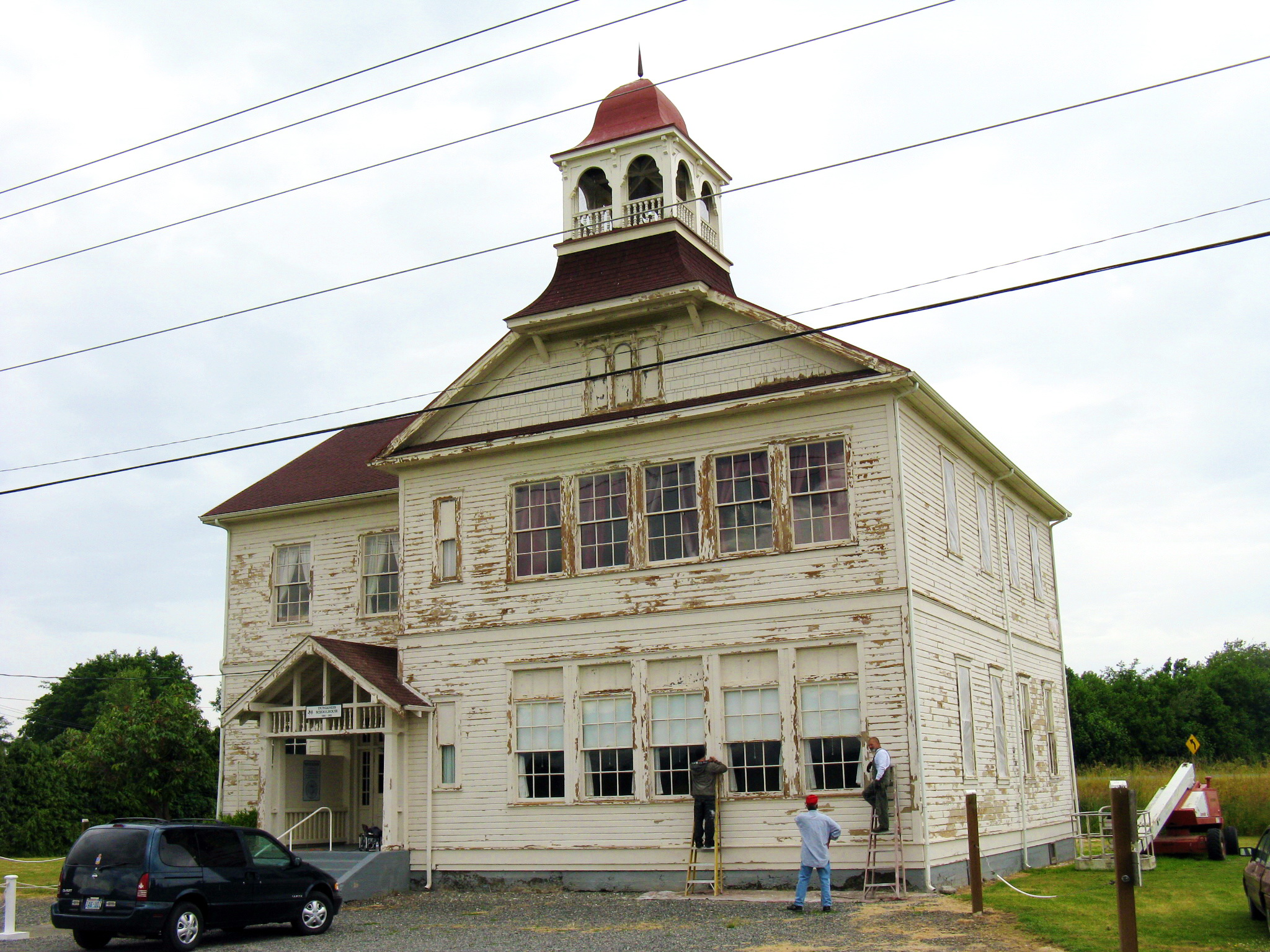

- Location within Washington (state)
- Location: 2781 Towne Road, Dungeness, Washington
- Coordinates: 48°08′34″N 123°07′42″W
- Area: less than one acre
- Built: 1892
- MPS: Rural Public Schools of Washington State MPS
- NRHP reference No.: 88000627
- Added to NRHP: May 19, 1988

The Dungeness School is a historical schoolhouse building located at 657 Towne Road in Dungeness, Washington. The idea for the school was formed in 1892 by the settlers of the Dungeness area. On May 10, 1892 a meeting was held in which settlers created a bond for land and a two-story school house. In August 1892, the Dungeness Beacon reported that the contract for construction was awarded to Hall and Duncan for $1,673. The school house opened on February 27, 1893. The school originally had 73 students from the ages of 5 to 20. The school had one teacher who lived on the second floor of the school. Classes were large and books and supplies not easy to get. School Board minutes of April 8, 1895, show a motion was passed to buy the school a bottle of ink.

In 1955, the Dungeness and Sequim School Districts were consolidated, and the old Dungeness School was closed. In 1967 the Dungeness Community Club purchased the land and the building from the Sequim School District. The Dungeness School was designated a Washington State Historical Site in 1971. On May 19, 1988, the building was listed on the National Register of Historic Places. In 1995, faced with rising maintenance costs, the schoolhouse was donated to the local museum and is now operated as a division of the Sequim Museum & Arts.

The original building was 36 feet by 48 feet, and then in 1921 a second wing was constructed. A USGS datum point was placed on the southeast corner of the building in 1929. In 2008 the Schoolhouse Belfry along with the original school bell was restored.

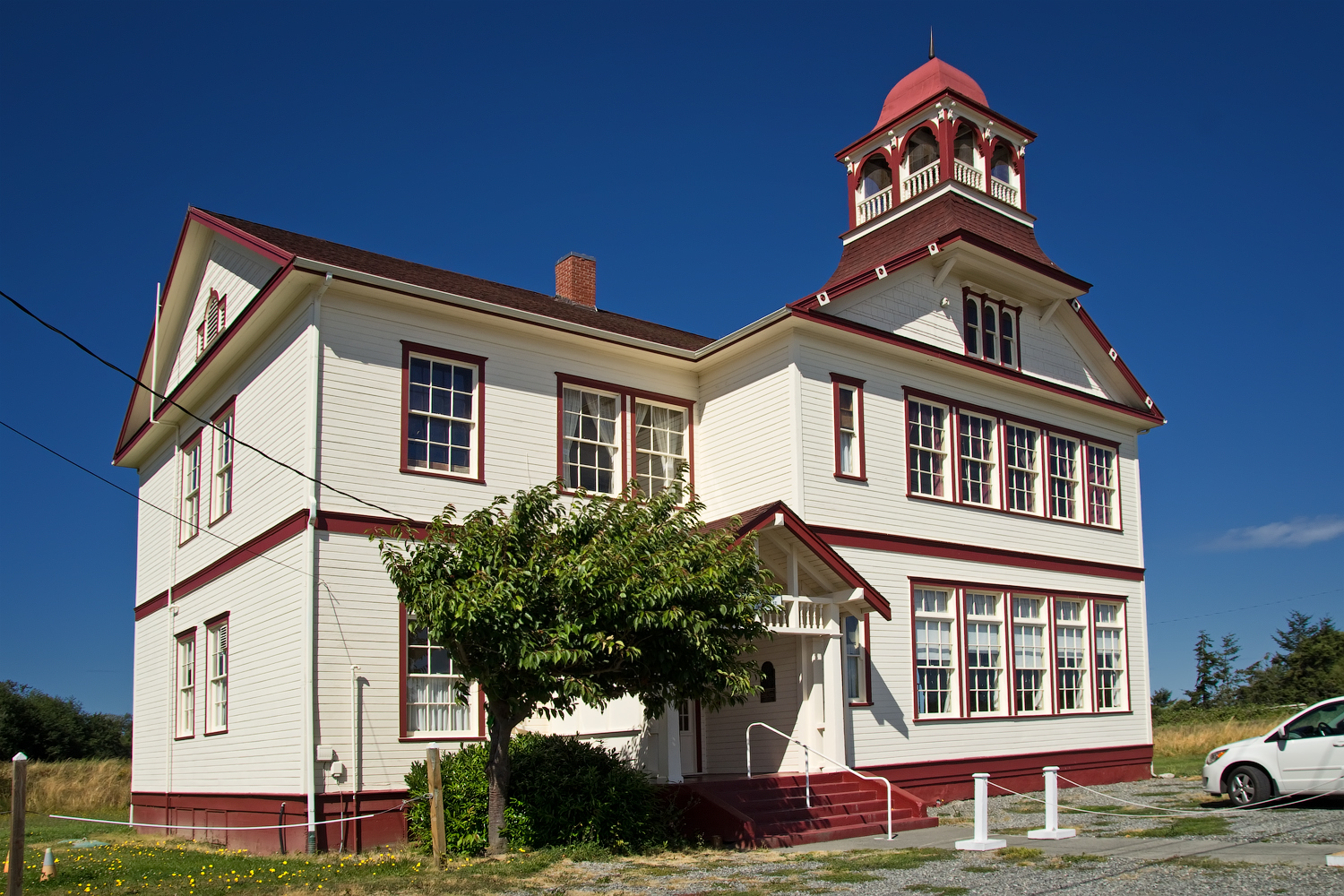
The Dungeness School 2012.

== See also ==
- Sequim Museum & Arts
