= KSTI =

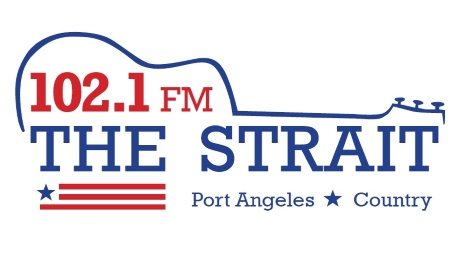
- Port Angeles, Washington; United States
- Frequency: 102.1 MHz
- Branding: The Strait 102

Programming
- Format: Country

Ownership
- Owner: Radio Pacific, Inc.
- Sister stations: KONP, KZEG

History
- First air date: July 15, 2015
- Call sign meaning: The Strait of Juan de Fuca

Technical information
- Licensing authority: FCC
- Facility ID: 190439
- Class: A
- ERP: 3,600 Watts
- HAAT: −82 meters (−269 ft)
- Transmitter coordinates: 48°5′50.70″N 123°29′9.30″W

Links
- Public license information: Public file; LMS
- Webcast: KSTI Webstream
- Website: www.myclallamcounty.com

KSTI is a country music broadcast radio station licensed to Port Angeles, Washington, serving Port Angeles and Sequim in Washington. KSTI is owned and operated by Radio Pacific, Inc.
