= KZEG (FM) =

Coordinates: 48°07′33″N 123°07′02″W

- Sequim, Washington; United States
- Broadcast area: Port Angeles, Washington; Port Townsend, Washington
- Frequency: 104.9 MHz
- Branding: Z104.9

Programming
- Format: Classic hits
- Affiliations: Compass Media Networks

Ownership
- Owner: Radio Pacific, Inc.
- Sister stations: KONP, KSTI

History
- First air date: June 6, 2018 (as KZQM)
- Former call signs: KZQM (2018-2024)

Technical information
- Licensing authority: FCC
- Facility ID: 191496
- Class: A
- ERP: 6,000 watts
- HAAT: 22 meters (72 ft)

Links
- Public license information: Public file; LMS
- Website: www.myclallamcounty.com/z-104-9-on-air/

KZEG (104.9 FM) is a radio station operating in Sequim, Washington.

Monikered as “Rock Classic Hits", Z-104.9 plays a format of top hits from the 1960s-1980s.

KZEG is owned and operated by Radio Pacific, Inc. Its sister stations are KONP and KSTI based in neighboring Port Angeles.

Having launched under the callsign KZQM, the station changed callsigns to KZEG on November 12, 2024, coinciding with the addition of Compass Media Networks' The Anna and Raven Show during mornings, in part to settle a dispute with similarly-called KSQM over the closeness of the callsign and resultant confusion from audiences. Other than the call change and show addition, no other changes were made to the format, to the point even the logo simply switched out the 2 differing letters at that time.

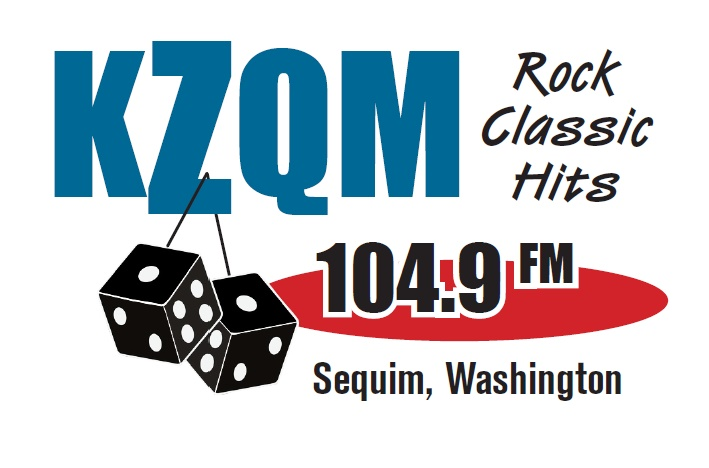
Logo as KZQM; current logo is the same, but carries the KZEG callsign
