= Dungeness, Washington =

Unincorporated community in Washington, United States

- Unincorporated community
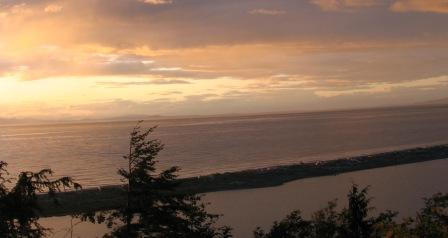
- Dungeness Spit at dusk

- Location within Washington (state)
- Coordinates: 48°08′48″N 123°07′24″W
- Country: United States
- State: Washington
- County: Clallam
- Elevation: 10 ft (3.0 m)
- Time zone: UTC-8 (Pacific (PST))
  - Summer (DST): UTC-7 (PDT)
- GNIS feature ID: 1512162

Dungeness is an unincorporated community in Clallam County, Washington, United States, located north of Sequim and on the Strait of Juan de Fuca. Dungeness has a number of waterfront residential communities, but also features the Dungeness Spit, a popular destination for locals and tourists.

== History ==
The name "Dungeness" refers to the Dungeness headland in England. It was given by George Vancouver in 1792, who wrote: "The low sandy point of land, which from its great resemblance to Dungeness in the English Channel, It is called New Dungeness."

Dungeness crab get their name from the area, where the first commercial fishing was done for the species. The Dungeness crab fishery began in 1848 and is said to be the oldest known shellfish fishery of the North Pacific coast. Crab flourish in Dungeness Bay, and crabbing is a popular local pastime.

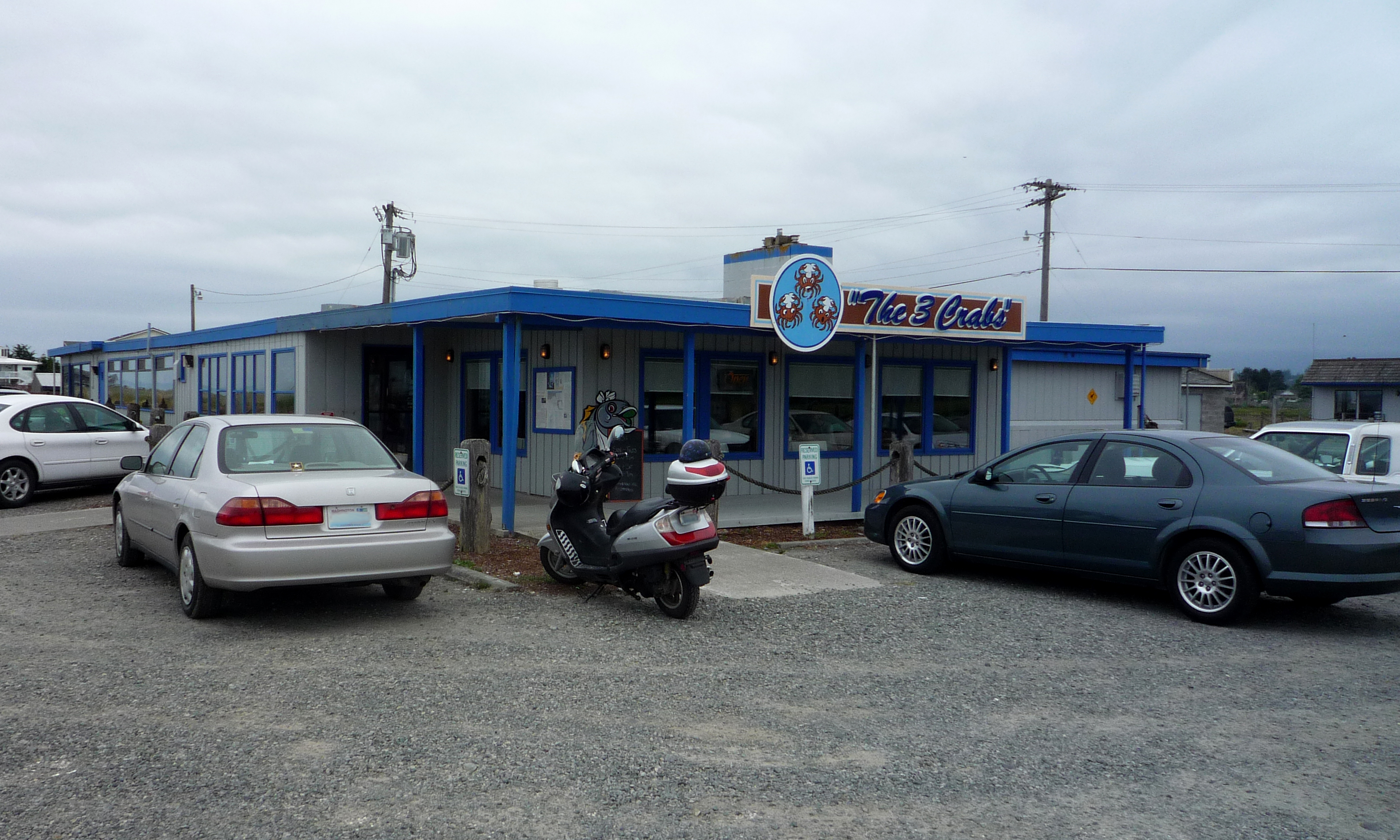
The 3 Crabs

== Geography ==
Smaller communities within the Dungeness area include Old Town, which is located near the Cline Spit, and Jamestown, located around Jamestown Road.

== Parks and recreation ==
Recreational areas in and near Dungeness include Cline Spit and the Dungeness National Wildlife Refuge which contain many trails. The latter contains the Dungeness Spit, Washington state's longest natural sand spit and home to the New Dungeness Light House.

Dungeness is currently home to Nash's Organic Farm, Five Acre School, and Olympic Lavender Heritage Farm. The latter is home of the Olympic Lavender Festival and one of many farms featured during the annual Sequim Lavender Farm Tour in July and annual Tour de Lavender Metric Century Ride in August.
