= KONP =

Radio station in Port Angeles, Washington

Coordinates: 48°05′55″N 123°24′20″W

- Port Angeles, Washington; United States
- Frequency: 1450 kHz
- Branding: Newsradio KONP

Programming
- Format: News/Talk
- Network: ABC News Radio
- Affiliations: CBS News Radio; Genesis Communications Network; Premiere Networks; Westwood One

Ownership
- Owner: Radio Pacific, Inc.
- Sister stations: KSTI, KZEG

History
- First air date: February 3, 1945
- Call sign meaning: Olympic National Park

Technical information
- Licensing authority: FCC
- Facility ID: 54717
- Class: C
- Power: 1,000 watts day; 910 watts night
- Translators: 101.3 K267CT (Sequim); 101.7 K269FX (Port Angeles)

Links
- Public license information: Public file; LMS
- Webcast: Listen Live
- Website: www.myclallamcounty.com

KONP (1450 kHz) is a commercial AM radio station in Port Angeles, Washington. It airs a news-talk radio format and is owned by Radio Pacific, Inc. KONP is co-owned with KSTI and KZQM, with studios on East First Street.

By day, KONP broadcasts at 1,000 watts, using a non-directional antenna. But to protect other stations on 1450 AM from interference at night, it reduces power to 910 watts. Programming is also heard on two FM translators: 101.3 K267CT in Sequim and 101.7 K269FX in Port Angeles.

== Programming ==
Weekdays on KONP begin with The Peninsula's Morning News and The Morning Scramble, two local news and interview shows. There are also news blocks at noon and 4 p.m., and a one-hour midday local talk program, The Todd Ortloff Show. The rest of the weekday schedule is nationally syndicated talk shows: Armstrong & Getty, The Ramsey Show with Dave Ramsey, CBS Eye on The World with John Batchelor, Our American Stories with Lee Habeeb, Coast to Coast AM with George Noory and America in The Morning with John Trout. Most hours begin with an update from ABC News Radio.

KONP also has live play-by-play sports: Seattle Kraken hockey, Seattle Mariners baseball, Seattle Seahawks football and University of Washington Huskies football, as well as local high school sports.

== History ==
Evening Press Inc., a subsidiary of the Port Angeles Evening News Inc., first sought an AM radio license for the city of Port Angeles in 1937. (The newspaper is now the Peninsula Daily News.) Final FCC approval was delayed nearly eight years due to international reallocation of frequencies, then suspension of all newspaper applications, and finally wartime suspension of all new construction.

The station finally signed on the air on February 3, 1945. The station's first tower was a locally-cut 180-foot Douglas fir. The studios were at 313 West First Street.

Through the 1960s and 70s, KONP played Top 40 music. The station switched to full service adult contemporary music, with news and sports, through the 80s and 90s. It was then that KONP changed its on-air moniker to "Newsradio 1450 KONP" and switched to a news-talk format.

KONP has remained locally owned since it first went on the air. It continues to provide Port Angeles and surrounding areas with a mix of syndicated and local programming. KONP offers local, regional, national and world news, sports, talk and community events. KONP has won numerous awards and recognition for its news and community information coverage.

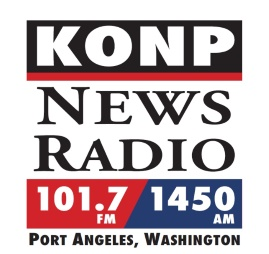
Logo before 101.3 translator sign on

KONP added two FM translators to its broadcasts: 101.7 FM in Port Angeles and 101.3 FM in Sequim and Eastern Clallam County, as well as its longtime 1450 kHz spot on the AM dial.
