= New Dungeness Light =

Lighthouse in Washington, United States

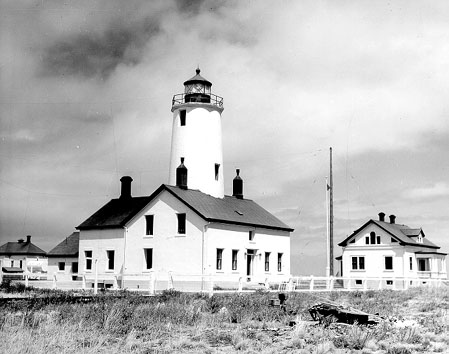
- Dungeness Lighthouse after 1927
- Location: Sequim, Washington
- Coordinates: 48°10′55″N 123°6′37″W

Tower
- Constructed: 1857
- Foundation: Surface
- Construction: Brick, sandstone and stucco
- Automated: 1976
- Height: 63 feet (19 m)
- Shape: Conical
- Heritage: National Register of Historic Places listed place

Light
- First lit: 1857
- Focal height: 20 m (66 ft)
- Lens: Third order Fresnel lens (removed)
- Range: 18 nautical miles (33 km; 21 mi)
- Characteristic: Alternating white flash every 5 seconds
- New Dungeness Lighthouse Station
- U.S. National Register of Historic Places
- U.S. Historic district
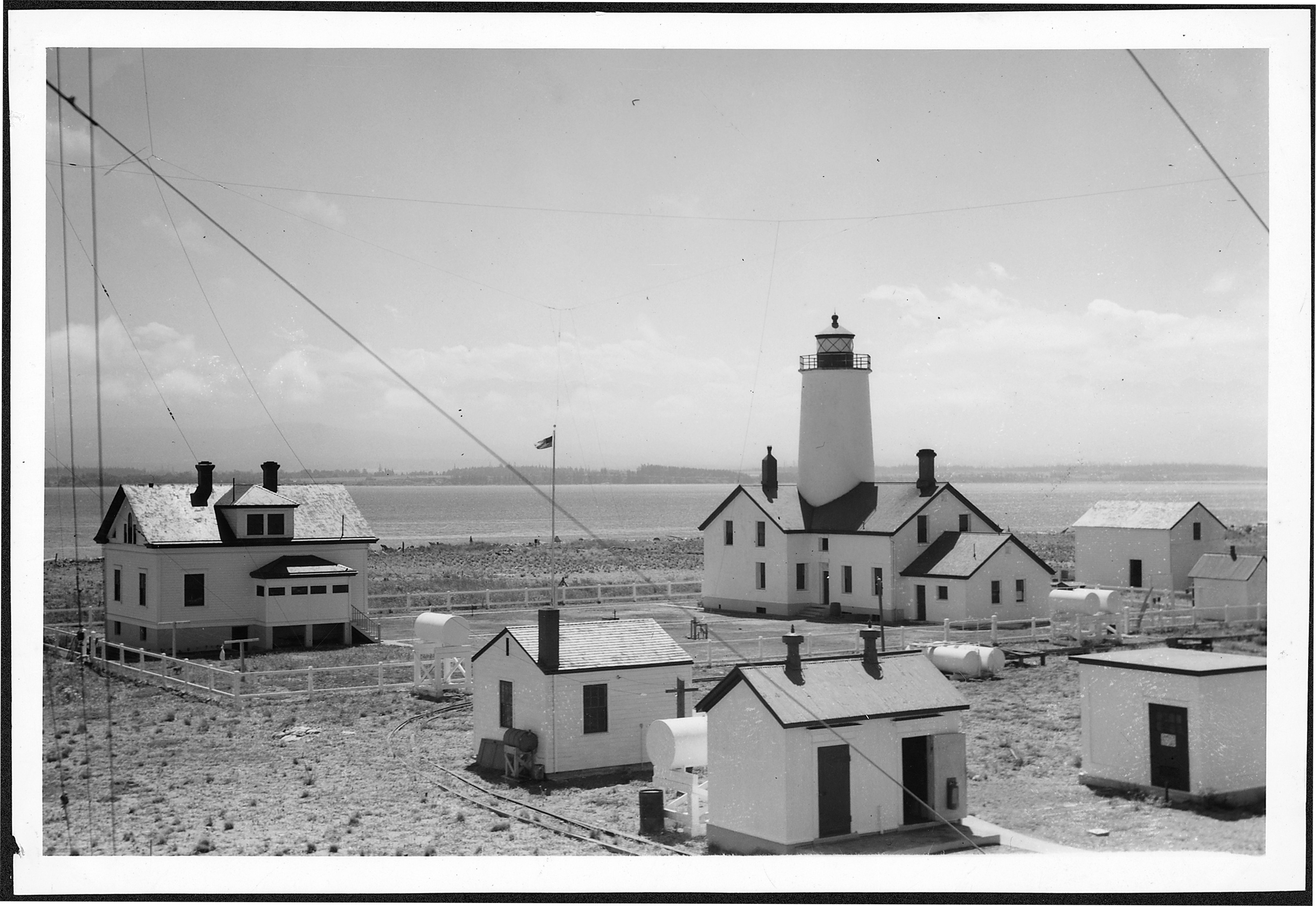
- Location: On Dungeness Spit, about 7 miles (11 km) north of Sequim
- Area: 8 acres (3.2 ha)
- Built by: Isaac Smith
- Architect: Ammi B. Young
- Architectural style: Mid 19th Century Revival
- NRHP reference No.: 93001338
- Added to NRHP: November 30, 1993

The New Dungeness Lighthouse is a functioning aid to navigation on the Strait of Juan de Fuca, located on the Dungeness Spit in the Dungeness National Wildlife Refuge near Sequim, Clallam County, in the U.S. state of Washington. It has been in continuous operation since 1857, although the current lighthouse tower is 26 feet (7.9 m) shorter than when first constructed.

== History ==
The New Dungeness Light was first lit in 1857 and was the second lighthouse established in the Washington territory, following the Cape Disappointment Light of 1856. Originally, the lighthouse was a 1½-story duplex with a 100-foot (30 m) tower rising from the roof. The tower was painted black on the top half and white on the lower section. Over time, the tower developed structural cracks, most likely from a combination of earthquakes and weather erosion. In 1927, the cracks in the tower were so severe that the district's chief lighthouse engineer, Clarence Sherman, noting the structural instabilities, feared that the tower would topple. It was decided that year that the tower would be lowered to its current height of 63 feet (19 m). With the new tower dimensions, the original 3rd order fresnel lens was too large for the tower. To save costs, the lantern room from the decommissioned Admiralty Head lighthouse was removed and placed atop the shorter tower. The newly painted tower was relit with a revolving 4th order Fresnel lens.

In the mid-1970s the Coast Guard decided to remove the Fresnel lens and test a DCB airport style beacon. The beacon only lasted a few years until it was replaced by a much smaller AGA-acrylic revolving beacon that provided the same range as the DCB, but with a 150-watt bulb instead of the 1,000-watt DCB bulb. In 1998, the Coast Guard replaced the AGA with a newer Vega rotating beacon.

The New Dungeness Light Station historic district, a 8 acres (3.2 ha) area comprising the lighthouse, the keeper's quarters and three other contributing properties was added to the National Register of Historic Places in 1993.

=== Keepers ===
Henry Blake was the lighthouse's first keeper. The USCG coastal buoy tender WLM-563 Henry Blake based in Everett, Washington is named after him. Franklin Tucker, the temporary keeper from 1857 to 1858, replaced Blake in 1873. He remained in charge from April of that year until December 1882, when he was transferred to Ediz Hook Light Station and replaced by Amos Morgan, who served until March 1896. In the late 1890s, Oscar Brown and Joseph Dunn served as station keepers.

By 1994, the Dungeness Lighthouse was one of the few lighthouses in the United States to have a full-time keeper. Michelle and Seth Jackson and their dog Chicago were the last to hold the post of lighthouse keepers. In March 1994, the Coast Guard boarded up all the windows at the station, checked all the electrical equipment and left. Within months, the United States Lighthouse Society started the New Dungeness chapter and were able to secure a lease from the Coast Guard. Since September 1994, members of the New Dungeness Light Station Association have staffed the station 24 hours per day, 365 days per year, and tours are available to the general public between 9AM - 5PM every day.
