= North Olympic Library System =

Public library system in Washington, United States

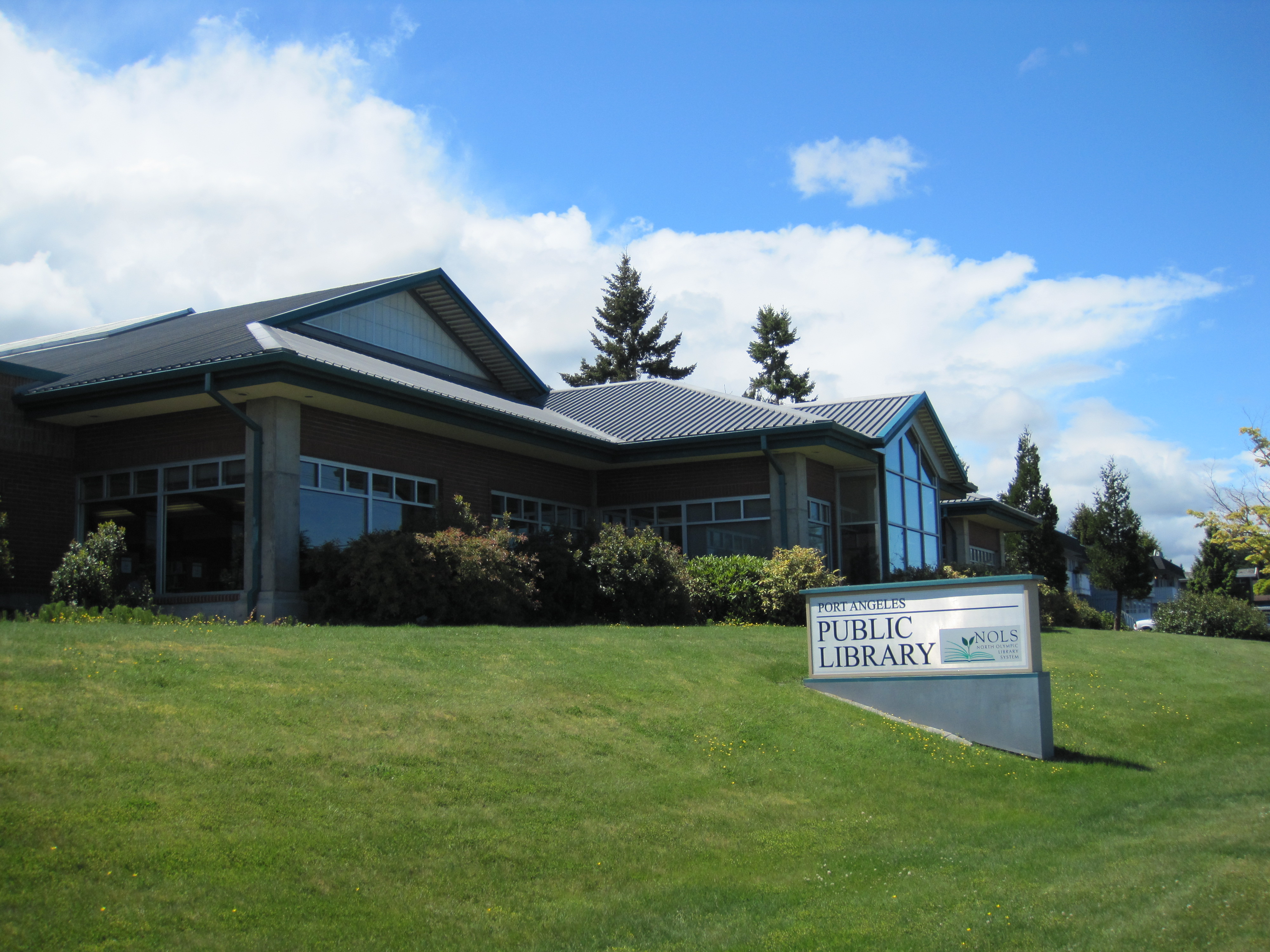
- The Port Angeles Main Library
- Location: Clallam County, Washington
- Established: 1973
- Branches: 4

Collection
- Size: 261,300 items in 2013

Access and use
- Access requirements: Residence in Clallam County
- Circulation: 978,700 checkouts in 2013
- Population served: 72,312 (Est. Clallam County population in 2013)

Other information
- Budget: $3.8 million in 2014
- Director: Margaret Jakubcin
- Employees: 51 FTE
- Website: http://www.nols.org/

The North Olympic Library System (NOLS) is a junior taxing district providing public library services to all of Clallam County, Washington, United States. The Library System is governed by a five-member volunteer Board of Trustees, the members of which are appointed by the Clallam County Commissioners.

The System consists of a Main Library and Administrative Center in Port Angeles, branches in Clallam Bay, Forks, and Sequim, an Outreach program providing books and other materials to people who are homebound, and a variety of web-based services. NOLS offers a collection of more than 260,000 items, including books, DVDs, ebooks, audiobooks, CDs, and extensive online resources. Residency in Clallam County is required for full service, but NOLS does offer limited service accounts to visitors and non-residents who can establish proof of identity. All NOLS libraries offer free Wi-Fi connections.

NOLS is supported primarily by property taxes and other government revenue, which made up 90% of revenues in 2013. Additional revenue comes in the form of grants and donations, overdue fines and charges, and other miscellaneous income. The NOLS budget for 2014 is $3.8 million.

== History ==
The Clallam County Rural Library was formed in January 1945 following a favorable vote of the people in November 1944. The County Library Headquarters was established in the basement of the Port Angeles City Library, not then a part of the county system, and a contract was signed with the city to provide library service to county residents in the Port Angeles area. A branch library was opened in Forks in the old grade school the very first year, and Sequim joined the county system in 1947 following the completion of the Clyde Rhodefer Memorial Library Building. Unable to afford a bookmobile, the library initiated mobile service using private cars and an old Red Cross disaster unit. The first regular bookmobile was purchased in 1947. In addition, deposit stations were opened in Joyce and Eden Valley.

In 1948, the District’s headquarters moved to a new location, 507 South Lincoln Street, and again in 1949 to 114 West Eighth Street, where it remained until 1966. In 1964, the Library Board purchased land at the intersection of Peabody Street and Lauridsen Boulevard and started construction of a new service center facility following a successful bond issue election in November of that year. The building was completed in April 1966 at a cost of approximately $120,000 including furniture and landscaping.

The Port Angeles City Library and the County Library District merged in 1973, forming one library system to serve all residents of the county. It was at this time that the name North Olympic Library System was adopted.

== Branches ==
- Clallam Bay Branch Library
- Forks Branch Library
- Outreach Services
- Port Angeles Main Library and Administrative Center
- Sequim Branch Library
