= Sequim Bay =

Bay of Washington state, US

Coordinates: 48°3′0″N 123°1′11″W

Sequim Bay

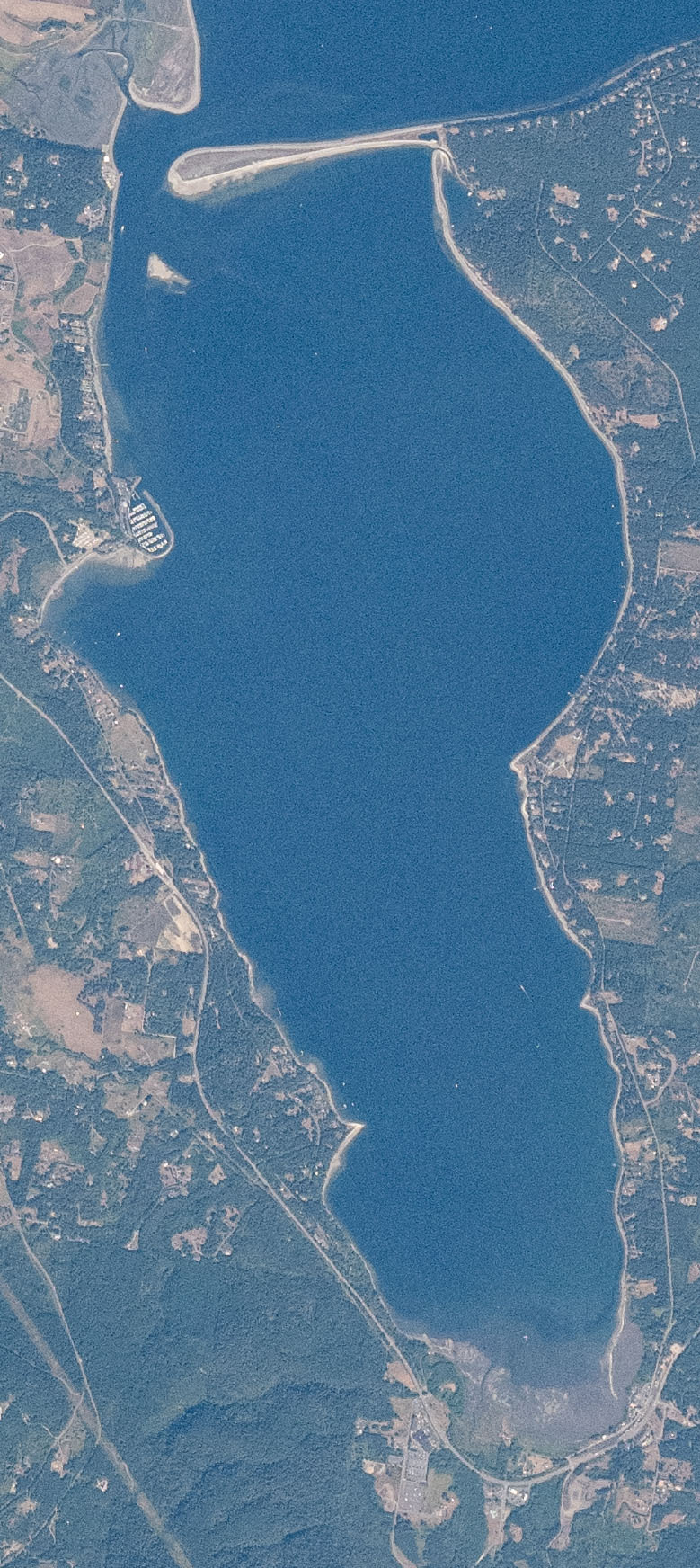
View from ISS Expedition 71, August 2024

Sequim Bay is a bay in northwestern Washington, on the Olympic Peninsula. The bay is on the Strait of Juan de Fuca of the Pacific Ocean and is located east of Sequim, Washington and north of Blyn. Sequim Bay is about 2 miles (3.2 km) long and slightly over 1 mile (1.6 km) wide at the mouth.

The name "Sequim" comes from a Native American word for "place for going to shoot".

Sequim Bay State Park is located on the shore of Sequim Bay.
