= Andrew Nisbet Jr. =

American politician

Member of the Washington House of Representatives from the 24th district
- In office 1979–1983 Serving with Brad Owen

Personal details
- Born: September 10, 1921 Oakland, California
- Died: February 24, 2013 (aged 91) Leavenworth, Kansas

Andrew Nisbet Jr. (September 10, 1921 – February 24, 2013) was an American military officer and state legislator.

Born in Oakland, California, Nisbet went to Stanford University, University of Georgia, and Columbia University. In 1942 Nisbet enlisted in the United States Army and retired in 1975. Nisbet and his wife moved to Sequim, Washington. Nisbet served as port commissioner for Port Angeles, Washington. He also served in the Washington House of Representatives 1978–1982 as a Republican. Nisbet died in Leavenworth, Kansas.
