= Five Acre School =

School in Washington, United States

Coordinates: 48.131758°N 123.1881804°W

Five Acre School is a private pre-school and elementary school next to the Dungeness Wildlife Refuge in Sequim, Washington state. The School was founded in 1994 by Bill and Juanita Jevne and is currently a 501c3 non-profit organization.

Five Acre School serves children from three to twelve. The school has four classrooms: the Primary Class (pre-school), the Discovery Class (kindergarten and 1st grade), the Adventure Class (2nd and 3rd grade) and the Explorer Class (4th, 5th and 6th grade). There are ten faculty and staff including a director.

The school focuses on the arts, the outdoors and project-based learning. Every Wednesday students go on day hikes in the woods and beaches around the school. Students have art and music several times through the week.
