= Sequim Valley Airport =

- IATA: SQV; ICAO: none; FAA LID: W28

Summary
- Airport type: Public use
- Owner: Winifred Sallee
- Serves: Sequim, Washington
- Elevation AMSL: 151 ft / 46 m
- Coordinates: 48°05′53″N 123°11′14″W

Map
- Location of airport in Washington W28 (the United States)

Runways
Direction	Length		Surface
Direction	ft	m	Surface
9/27	3,508	1,069	Asphalt

Statistics (2022)
- Aircraft operations: 8,310
- Based aircraft: 30
- Source: Federal Aviation Administration

Sequim Valley Airport (IATA: SQV, FAA LID: W28) is a privately owned, public use airport located four nautical miles (5 mi, 7 km) northwest of the central business district of Sequim, a city in Clallam County, Washington, United States.

== History ==
During 2022, a website named Barnstormers.com listed the airport as "being for sale" with an asking price of $4,750,000 US dollars.

== Facilities and aircraft ==
Sequim Valley Airport covers an area of 150 acres (61 ha) at an elevation of 151 feet (46 m) above mean sea level. It has one runways: 9/27 is 3,508 by 40 feet (1,069 x 12 m) with an asphalt surface.

For the 12-month period ending December 31, 2022, the airport had 8,310 aircraft operations, an average of 23 per day, 98% general aviation, <1% air taxi, and <1% military. At that time there were 30 aircraft based at this airport: 28 single-engine, 1 multi-engine, and 1 ultra-light.

== See also ==
- List of airports in Washington
