= Manis Mastodon site =

Historic place in Washington, United States

Coordinates: 48°03′16″N 123°06′54″W

- Manis Mastodon Site
- U.S. National Register of Historic Places
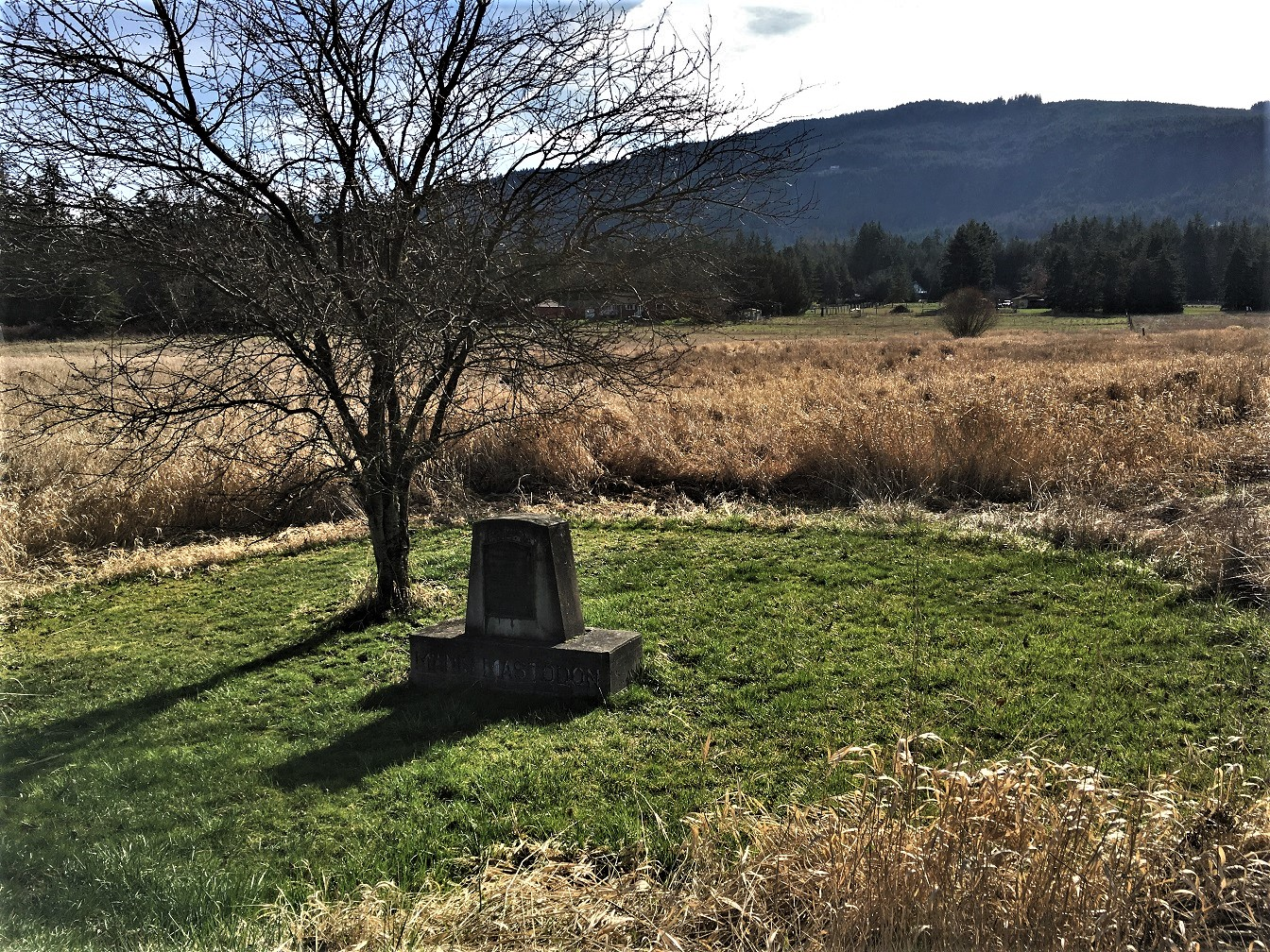

- Location within Washington (state)
- Nearest city: Sequim, Washington
- NRHP reference No.: 78002736
- Added to NRHP: March 21, 1978

The Manis Mastodon Site is a 2-acre (1 ha) archaeological site on the Olympic Peninsula near Sequim, Washington, United States, discovered in 1977. During the 1977–78 excavation, the remains of an American mastodon were recovered with a 13,800-year-old projectile point made of the bone from a different mastodon embedded in its rib. The site was placed on the National Register of Historic Places in 1978.

== History ==
Emanuel “Manny” Nicholas Manis (1926-2000) was excavating a dry peat bog on his property in Happy Valley (just south of Sequim, WA) with a backhoe when he found two tusks of an American mastodon on August 8, 1977. An archaeological excavation led by Dr. Carl Eugene Gustafson (1936-2016) of Washington State University found a rib bone that had what appeared to be a spear point made from the bone of a different mastodon embedded in it. The point had bone growth around it, indicating that it had not caused the mastodon's death. Gustafson deemed it the earliest known evidence of interaction between humans and mastodons in the Americas. However, there was debate, because of the lack of indisputable proof that the point was made by humans. This situation changed in 2011, when a new study of the remains definitively concluded that Gustafson was right as to both the age and the human origin of the point. Others are less certain about the human origin of the point as it is unusually thin and has not been smoothed. Gustafson also analyzed the position of the 6,800-kilogram (14,991 lb) fossil, which was lying on its left side, while the heavily fragmented skull was rotated 180 degrees from its natural position. Noting that this could not have occurred due to natural causes Gustafson deduced that the carcass must have been tampered with by humans. Archaeologists were surprised to find a mastodon in the area at all because pollen samples that were taken showed no evidence of trees, which mastodons fed on.

In an excavated layer above the mastodon, as well as that of a 6,700-year-old deposit of ash from the eruption of Mount Mazama, a projectile-point was found in the style of Cascade points common in the area no earlier than 9,000 years ago.

The site also turned up remains of caribou, bison, and plant macrofossils. Bones of the bison showed evidence of butchering by humans. The pollen found in the same layer as the mastodon was predominantly sedge and cattail, while other layers contained that of plants ranging from Canadian buffaloberry, blackberry and wild rose, to willow and alder.

Gustafson continued to excavate at the site for eight years, finding the partial remains of two more mastodons. Though stone tools and artifacts of bone were found, Gustafson failed to find evidence of an encampment by the people theorized to have butchered the mastodons.

Prior to the excavation at the Manis site, which was dated before 12,000 years ago, archaeological sites west of the Cascade Range considered to be early were aged between 9,000 and 6,000 years old.

During the years of excavation, Clare and Emanuel Manis welcomed over 50,000 visitors to the site. In 1978, when the site was added to the National Register of Historic Places, Senator Henry M. Jackson made the announcement. In 2002, on the 25th anniversary of the discovery, Manis' widow donated the site to The Archaeological Conservancy. The fossil remains of the mastodon were donated to the Sequim Museum & Arts in Sequim and are now on display. A casting of the bone projectile point is also on display.

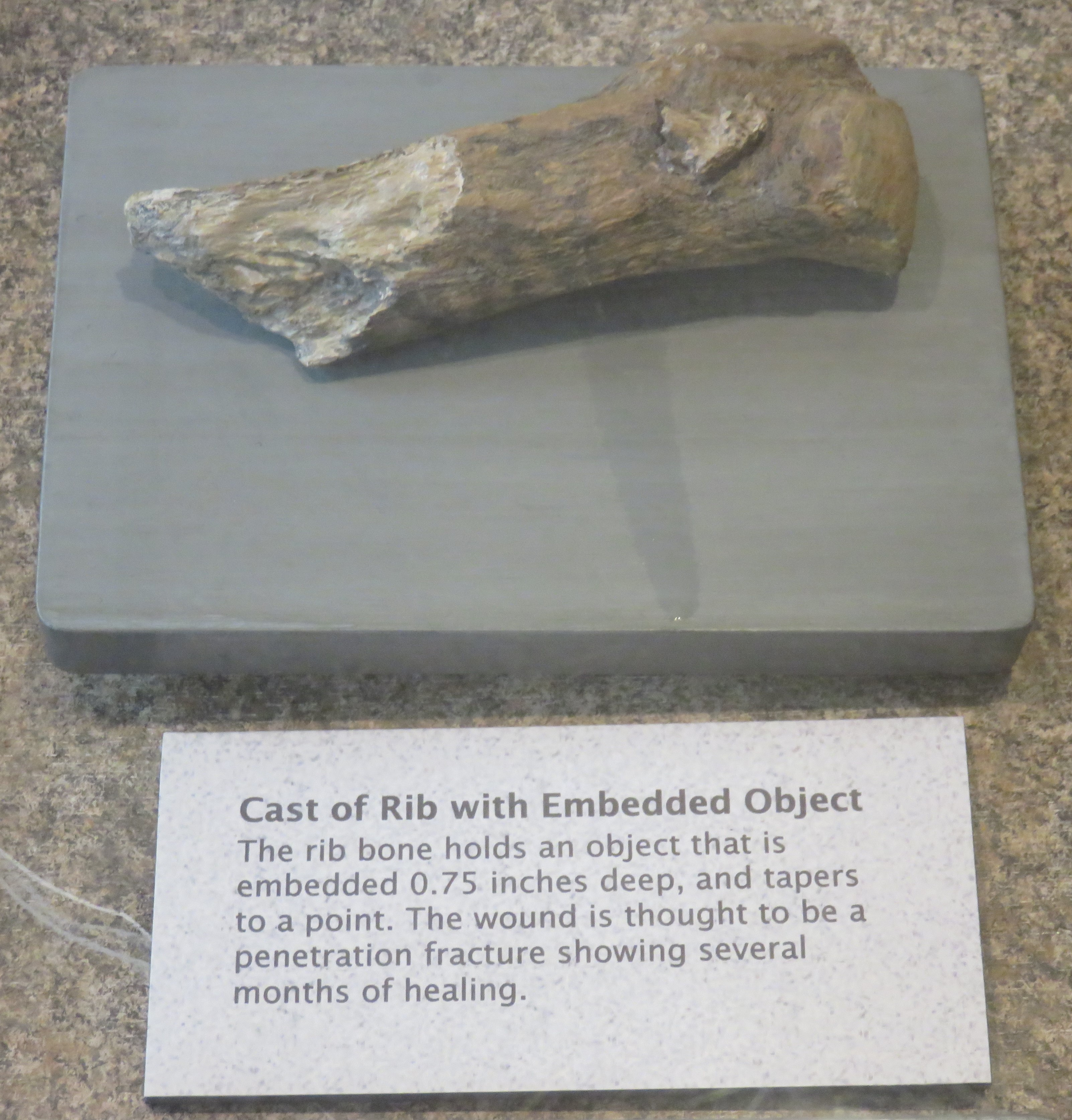
Manis Mastodon, Cast of Rib with Embedded Object; The rib bone holds an object that is embedded 0.75 inches deep, and tapers to a point. The wound is thought to be a penetration fracture showing several months of healing. Museum and Arts Center, Sequim, Washington.

In Oct. 2011, the Center of the Study of the First Americans (CSFA), Anthropology Department at Texas A&M University published findings from DNA tests, CT scans and radiocarbon dating on the mastodon and the spear point. The CT scan clearly established the spear point had been sharpened to a needle point by human hands. Four radiocarbon dates yielded an age of 13,860–13,763 calendar years BP.

Since the 1950s, archaeologists have believed the Clovis people were the first human inhabitants of North America and that they lived here 13,000 years ago. However the discovery of sites pre-dating Clovis, such as Monte Verde in Chile and Meadowcroft Rockshelter in Pennsylvania, have been challenging this presumption at least since the 1990s. The Manis Mastodon Site is 800 years older than the Clovis people. This site, among others, is helping to change the long-held beliefs of many archaeologists about the earliest human inhabitants of North America. Manis Mastodon remains the oldest archaeological site on the Olympic Peninsula in Washington State and one of the oldest in North America.

In November 2011, Shirley Manis, daughter of discoverer Emanuel Manis, authored a children's picture book about the Manis Mastodon Site, which includes the most recent research analysis.

== Sources ==
- Barton, Miles (2002). Prehistoric America: A Journey through the Ice Age and Beyond. Yale University Press. ISBN 0-30009819-7.
- Bergland, Eric O.; Marr, Jerry (1988). Prehistoric Life on the Olympic Peninsula: The First Inhabitants of Great American Wilderness. Pacific Northwest National Parks and Forests Association. ISBN 0-91401919-8.
- Daugherty, Richard D. Manis Mastodon Site (Clallam County, Washington), National Register of Historic Places Inventory-Nomination Form. National Park Service. On file at the Office of Archaeology and Historic Preservation, Olympia, Washington and at the National Park Service, Washington, DC.
- Gustafson, Carl E.; Gilbow, Delbert; Daugherty, Richard D. (1979). The Manis Mastodon Site: Early Man on the Olympic Peninsula, Canadian Journal of Archaeology, 3:157–164.
- Kirk, Ruth; Daugherty, Richard D. (1978). Exploring Washington Archaeology. University of Washington Press. ISBN 0-29595630-5.
- Kirk, Ruth; Daugherty, Richard D. (2007). Archaeology in Washington. University of Washington Press. ISBN 978-0-29598696-8.
- McMillan, Alan Daniel (1999). Since the Time of the Transformers: The Ancient Heritage of the Nuu-chah-nulth, Ditidaht, and Makah. UBC Press. ISBN 0-77480701-6.
- Manis, Shirley (2011). In a Scoop of Dirt – How Digging a Pond Changed North America's Prehistory. Shirley Manis. ISBN 978-0983928607.
- Meltzer, David J. (2009). First Peoples in a New World : Colonizing Ice Age America. Berkeley: University of California Press.
