= Sequim Museum & Arts =

Washington history museum

Coordinates: 48°5′2.2446″N 123°6′5.598″W

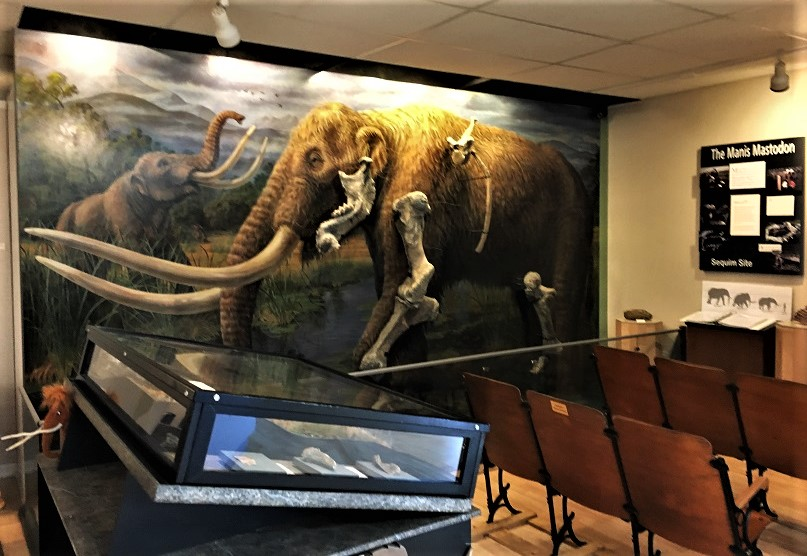
The Manis Mastodon Mural with the bones mounted. Photo taken from the first exhibit building.

The Sequim Museum & Arts, located in downtown Sequim, Washington, is a free-admission local history museum. Founded in 1976, the museum is home to the Manis Mastodon tusks and bones which were found at an early human encampment located on the present day Manis Farm, famous as one of the first-known contact between humans with a mastodon 13,000 years ago.

The Manis Mastodon exhibit features a mastodon mural mounted with the remaining mastodon bones, related artifacts, and a video about the archaeological digs. Additionally, the museum is home to many local and photographs from the 19th century which showcase the prosperous dairy industry. Models of the Mosquito Fleet, along with records of the Dungeness Wharf, Washington Harbor, and Port Williams serve as reminders of the early primary transportation to the region. The Cowan Family Collection is a rotating exhibit of natural history artifacts. The Judith McInnes Tozzer Gallery features exhibits from local artists and changes often. The Boys in the Boat exhibit about Joe Rantz and the gold medalist rowing team of the 1936 Olympics. Also on display are vintage vehicles and tractors, a dairy parlor, a logging display, as well as a Jamestown S'Klallam Tribe exhibit, which as of 10/2019 it is still under construction.

The museum's first exhibit building was opened May 10, 1979, at 175 W. Cedar Street where the former Post Office was. In 1992 merged with Peninsula Cultural Arts Center to become the Museum & Arts Center in the Sequim-Dungeness Valley. Then in 1995 the museum acquired the Dungeness School. On July 6, 2019, the current exhibit building opened. In 2019 the museum changed its name to the Sequim Museum & Arts

The Exhibit Center is located at 544 N. Sequim Ave. in Sequim. The museum administrative offices are located at the DeWitt Building, 544 N. Sequim Ave. The DeWitt Building also houses the Whatton Library for Historical Research, the Vollenweider Archives, the Robert Cooper Photography Studio, and the John & Inez Cowan Collection. The Dungeness School is located at 2781 Towne Rd.

The Sequim Museum operates and maintains the historic Dungeness School (available for rentals), Captain John Morris House and Washington Harbor Schoolhouse. The museum is a 501(c)(3) private nonprofit organization, supported by membership fees, donations, bequests, and grants. It does not receive any county or municipal funding.

== See also ==
- Manis Mastodon site
- Dungeness School
- Joe Rantz
