= KSQM =

Radio station in Sequim, Washington

- Sequim, Washington; United States
- Frequency: 91.5 MHz
- Branding: KSQM 91.5 FM

Programming
- Format: Community Radio

Ownership
- Owner: Sequim Community Broadcasting

History
- First air date: January 8, 2009
- Call sign meaning: "Sequim"

Technical information
- Licensing authority: FCC
- Facility ID: 172153
- Class: A
- ERP: 2,050 watts
- HAAT: -62 meters (-202 ft)
- Transmitter coordinates: 48°4′30″N 123°11′32″W

Links
- Public license information: Public file; LMS
- Website: www.ksqmfm.com

KSQM (91.5 MHz) is a non-commercial FM radio station in Sequim, Washington. It is listener-supported and is owned by Sequim Community Broadcasting. KSQM is a community radio station, staffed largely by volunteers. Music includes oldies, classic hits, adult standards and other genres, along with some talk programming.

KSQM is a Class A station. It has an effective radiated power (ERP) of 2,050 watts. The transmitter tower is on Blue Mountain Road in Port Angeles.

== See also ==
- List of community radio stations in the United States
