= Sequim, Washington =

- City
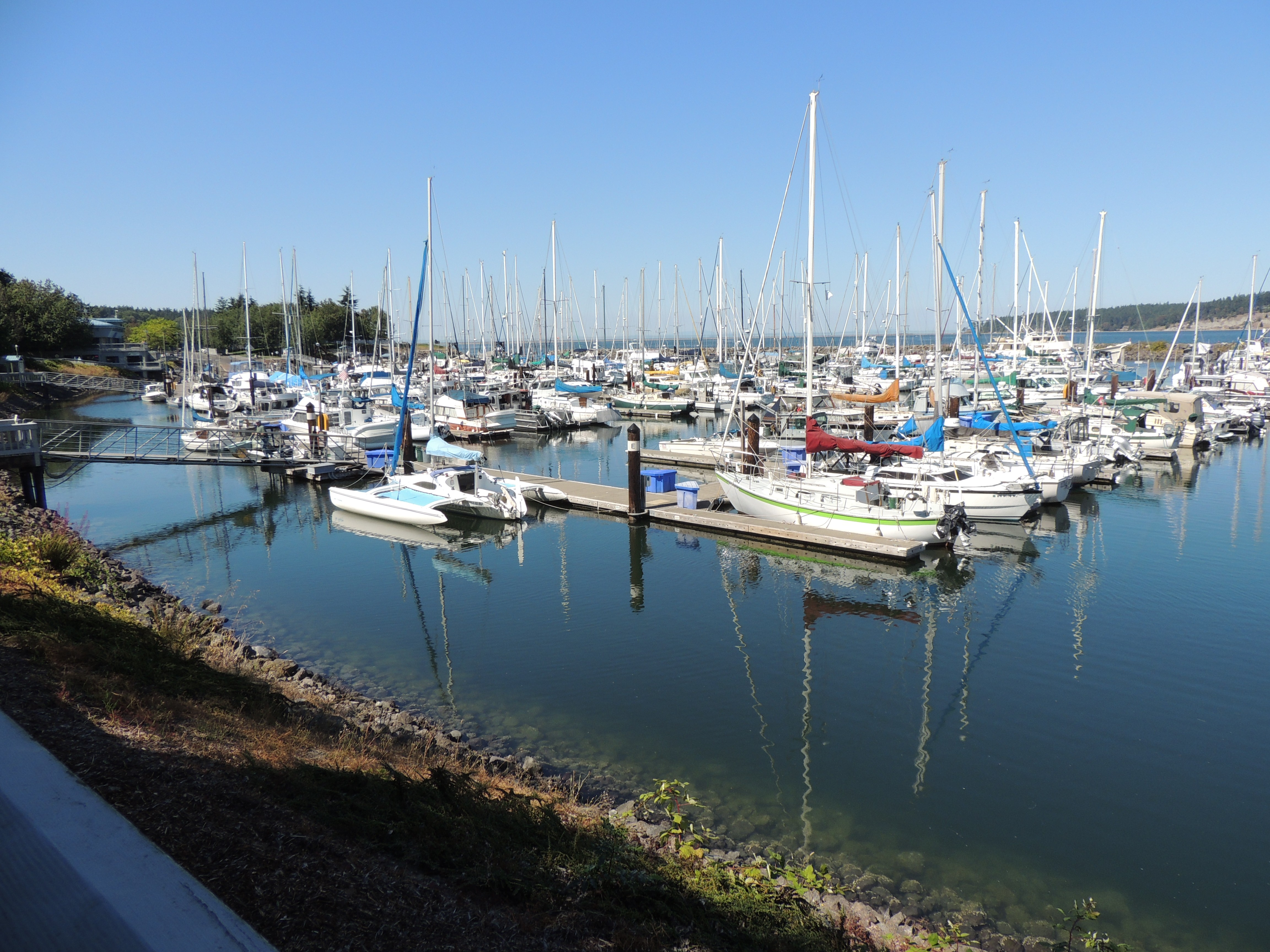
- John Wayne Marina in Sequim

- Sequim, Washington
- Coordinates: 48°04′25″N 123°06′44″W
- Country: United States
- State: Washington
- County: Clallam

Government
  - Type: Council–manager
  - Mayor: Brandon Janisse
  - Manager: Matt Huish

Area
  - Total: 6.40 sq mi (16.58 km^{2})
  - Land: 6.32 sq mi (16.37 km^{2})
  - Water: 0.081 sq mi (0.21 km^{2})
- Elevation: 167 ft (51 m)

Population (2020)
  - Total: 8,024
  - Estimate (2023): 8,203
  - Density: 1,252.5/sq mi (483.59/km^{2})
- Time zone: UTC-8 (Pacific (PST))
  - Summer (DST): UTC-7 (PDT)
- ZIP Code: 98382
- Area code: 360, 564
- FIPS code: 53-63385
- GNIS feature ID: 2411868
- Website: sequimwa.gov

Sequim (/ˈskwɪm/ SKWIM) is a city in Clallam County, Washington, United States. It is located on the north side of the Olympic Peninsula between the Dungeness River and Sequim Bay. The city is south of the Strait of Juan de Fuca and north of the Olympic Mountains. The population was 8,024 as of the 2020 census; the estimated population in 2023 was 8,203. Sequim is connected to nearby Port Angeles by U.S. Route 101, which runs south of the city's downtown.

The city lies within the rain shadow of the Olympic Mountains and receives, on average, less than 16 inches (410 mm) of rain per year – about the same as Los Angeles – giving rise to the region's local nickname of Sunny Sequim. However, the city is relatively close to some of the wettest temperate rainforests of the contiguous United States. This climate anomaly is sometimes called the "Blue Hole of Sequim". Fogs and cool breezes from the Strait of Juan de Fuca make Sequim's climate more humid than would be expected from the low average rate of annual precipitation.

Sequim and the surrounding area are particularly known for the commercial cultivation of lavender, supported by the unique climate. The city is nicknamed the "Lavender Capital of North America". The area is also known for its Dungeness crab, named for the nearby Dungeness Spit.

== Etymology ==
The name Sequim is derived from the Klallam word sxʷčkʷíyəŋ, which means "hunting ground" or "place for going to shoot". It was adopted as the name of the settlement in 1879, with the spelling replacing the earlier "Seguim". The historic translation of "quiet waters" was disproven in 2010 by linguist Timothy Montler, who had researched the Klallam language and interviewed elders of the Jamestown S'Klallam Tribe. Sequim is pronounced as one syllable, with the e elided: "skwim"; a common mispronounciation is "see-kwim".

== History ==
=== Indigenous inhabitants ===
Fossils discovered in the late 1970s – at a dig near Sequim known as the Manis Mastodon site, by Carl Gustafson, an archaeologist at Washington State University – included a mastodon bone with an embedded bone point, evidencing the presence of hunters in the area about 14,000 years ago. According to Michael R. Waters, an archaeologist at Texas A&M University, this is the first hunting weapon found that dates to the pre-Clovis period.

The S'Klallam tribe had inhabited the region prior to the arrival of the first Europeans. S'Klallam means "the strong people". The band of S'Klallam Indians disbanded into their own individual federally recognized tribes in the early 1900s. The local tribe is the Jamestown S'Klallam tribe, named after one of their early leaders, Lord James Balch. According to other tales, the town Sequim in S'Klallam means "a place for going to shoot", which represents the abundance of game and wildlife of the area. Archeological excavation during construction of the U.S. Route 101 bypass in the 1990s found artifacts that were dated between 6000 to 8000 years before present.

=== Settlement ===
Manuel Quimper and George Vancouver explored the region's coast in the 1790s. The first European settlers arrived in the Dungeness Valley in the 1850s, settling nearby Dungeness, Washington. While the lands along the river became fertile farmlands, the remainder of the area remained arid prairie, known as "the desert". Irrigation canals first brought water to the prairie in the 1890s, allowing the expansion of farmlands.

Sequim was officially incorporated on October 31, 1913. For many decades small farms, mostly dairy farms, dotted the area around the small town. Near the end of World War I, Sequim became a stop for a railway that passed through from Port Angeles to Port Townsend, built primarily to carry wood products from the forests of the western Olympic Peninsula.

== Geography ==
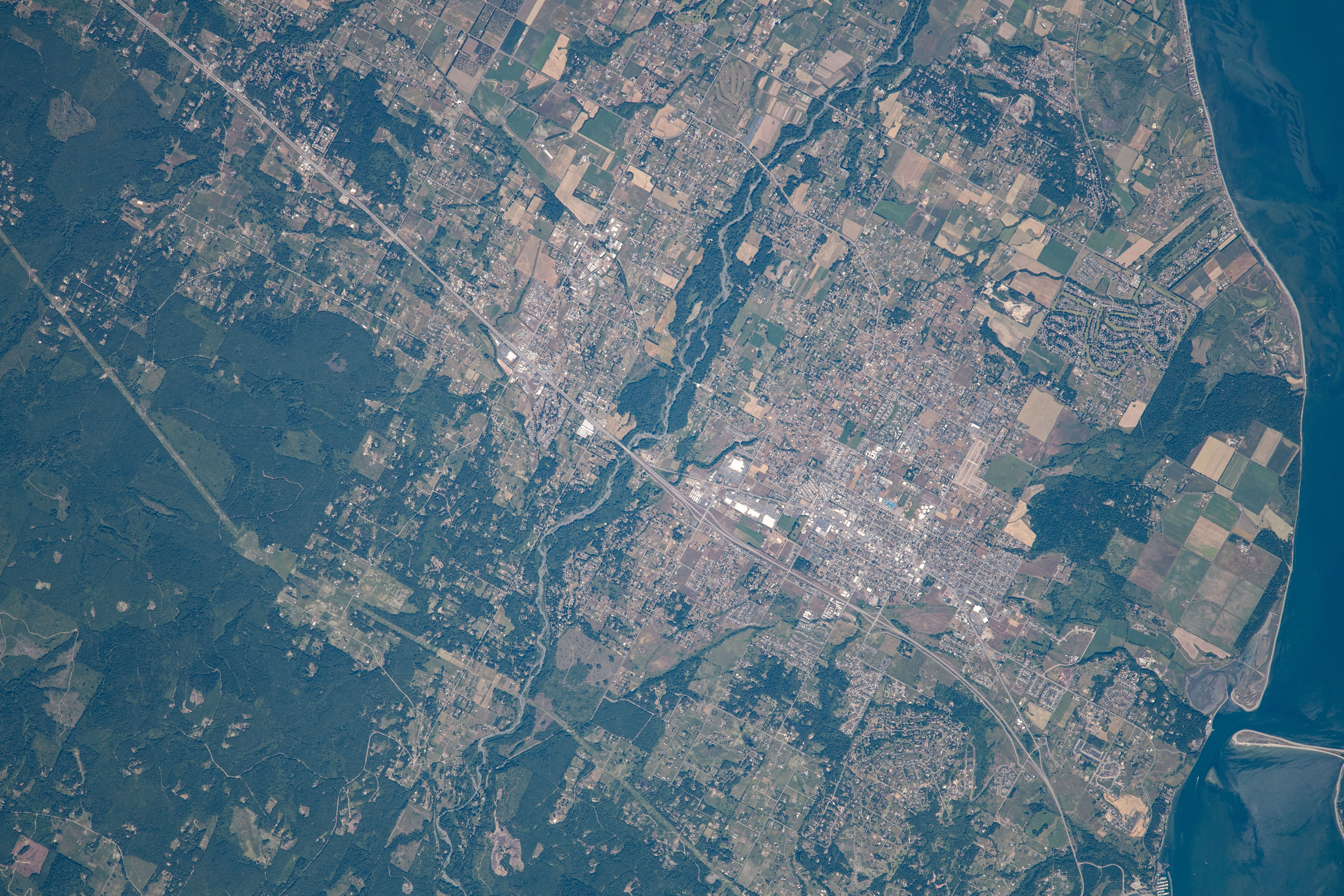
View of Sequim and the Dungeness River area from the International Space Station

According to the United States Census Bureau, the city has a total area of 6.37 square miles (16.50 km^{2}), of which 6.31 square miles (16.34 km^{2}) is land and 0.06 square miles (0.16 km^{2}) is water.

The forests around Sequim are dominated by Douglas-fir and western red cedar. Other trees growing in the area include black cottonwood, red alder, bigleaf maple, Pacific madrone, lodgepole pine and Garry oak, all of which can grow to a significant size. Historically, much of the area was an open, oak-studded prairie, supported by somewhat excessively-drained gravelly and sandy loam soil; agriculture and development of the Dungeness valley have changed this ecosystem. Most soils under Sequim have been placed in a series that is named after the city. This "Sequim series" is one of the few Mollisols in western Washington and its high base saturation, a characteristic of the Mollisol order, is attributed to the minimal leaching of bases caused by low annual rainfall.

Sequim is home to a herd of Roosevelt elk. The herd occasionally crosses U.S. Route 101 just to the southeast of the town. Radio collars on some members of the herd trigger warning lights for motorists.

=== Climate ===
Sequim experiences a warm-summer Mediterranean climate (Köppen climate classification Csb), sometimes classified as an oceanic climate owing to the relatively cool temperatures. Sequim is in the rain shadow of the Olympic Mountains, so annual precipitation is the lowest in the western portion of the state at only 16 inches. Winters are mostly mild with very little snowfall. Many years there is no snow at all. The highest temperature recorded in Sequim was 99 °F (37.2 °C) on July 16, 1941, and the lowest −3 °F (−19.4 °C) on January 19, 1935 and February 4, 1989.

Climate data for Sequim, Washington, 1991–2020 normals, extremes 1916–present
Month	Jan	Feb	Mar	Apr	May	Jun	Jul	Aug	Sep	Oct	Nov	Dec	Year
Record high °F (°C)	68 (20)	66 (19)	76 (24)	80 (27)	86 (30)	93 (34)	99 (37)	94 (34)	87 (31)	76 (24)	70 (21)	66 (19)	99 (37)
Mean maximum °F (°C)	56.3 (13.5)	55.9 (13.3)	61.6 (16.4)	67.1 (19.5)	74.3 (23.5)	79.1 (26.2)	82.3 (27.9)	82.4 (28.0)	75.5 (24.2)	66.7 (19.3)	59.8 (15.4)	55.2 (12.9)	85.2 (29.6)
Mean daily maximum °F (°C)	46.2 (7.9)	47.8 (8.8)	51.3 (10.7)	55.8 (13.2)	61.5 (16.4)	65.4 (18.6)	70.0 (21.1)	70.4 (21.3)	65.9 (18.8)	57.5 (14.2)	50.4 (10.2)	45.9 (7.7)	57.3 (14.1)
Daily mean °F (°C)	39.2 (4.0)	39.9 (4.4)	42.9 (6.1)	46.8 (8.2)	52.9 (11.6)	57.1 (13.9)	60.8 (16.0)	60.7 (15.9)	56.0 (13.3)	48.7 (9.3)	42.5 (5.8)	38.8 (3.8)	48.9 (9.4)
Mean daily minimum °F (°C)	32.3 (0.2)	32.1 (0.1)	34.5 (1.4)	37.9 (3.3)	44.2 (6.8)	48.8 (9.3)	51.5 (10.8)	51.1 (10.6)	46.2 (7.9)	39.9 (4.4)	34.6 (1.4)	31.8 (−0.1)	40.4 (4.7)
Mean minimum °F (°C)	19.7 (−6.8)	21.5 (−5.8)	24.8 (−4.0)	28.0 (−2.2)	33.2 (0.7)	39.5 (4.2)	43.2 (6.2)	42.4 (5.8)	36.5 (2.5)	28.3 (−2.1)	22.9 (−5.1)	20.3 (−6.5)	15.6 (−9.1)
Record low °F (°C)	−3 (−19)	−3 (−19)	12 (−11)	19 (−7)	27 (−3)	30 (−1)	35 (2)	33 (1)	27 (−3)	19 (−7)	4 (−16)	−1 (−18)	−3 (−19)
Average precipitation inches (mm)	2.18 (55)	1.39 (35)	1.49 (38)	1.23 (31)	1.16 (29)	0.94 (24)	0.51 (13)	0.56 (14)	0.87 (22)	1.63 (41)	2.64 (67)	2.25 (57)	16.85 (426)
Average snowfall inches (cm)	0.0 (0.0)	0.0 (0.0)	0.0 (0.0)	0.0 (0.0)	0.0 (0.0)	0.0 (0.0)	0.0 (0.0)	0.0 (0.0)	0.0 (0.0)	0.0 (0.0)	0.0 (0.0)	1.4 (3.6)	1.4 (3.6)
Average precipitation days (≥ 0.01 in)	16.2	13.5	14.5	12.4	10.7	8.8	4.8	5.2	8.6	13.2	16.7	16.7	141.3
Average snowy days (≥ 0.1 in)	0.2	0.0	0.0	0.0	0.0	0.0	0.0	0.0	0.0	0.0	0.0	0.1	0.3
Source 1: National Oceanic and Atmospheric Administration
Source 2: NOAA

== Demographics ==
Historical population
Census	Pop.	Note	%±
1920	402		—
1930	534		32.8%
1940	676		26.6%
1950	1,044		54.4%
1960	1,164		11.5%
1970	1,549		33.1%
1980	3,013		94.5%
1990	3,616		20.0%
2000	4,334		19.9%
2010	6,606		52.4%
2020	8,024		21.5%
2023 (est.)	8,203		2.2%
U.S. Decennial Census

=== 2020 census ===
As of the 2020 census, Sequim had a population of 8,024 people. The median age was 63.7 years; 12.2% of residents were under the age of 18 and 47.6% were 65 years of age or older. For every 100 females there were 78.4 males, and for every 100 females age 18 and over there were 74.2 males age 18 and over.

There were 4,063 households in Sequim, of which 14.7% had children under the age of 18 living in them. Of all households, 38.0% were married-couple households, 16.7% were households with a male householder and no spouse or partner present, and 39.4% were households with a female householder and no spouse or partner present. About 42.9% of all households were made up of individuals and 30.9% had someone living alone who was 65 years of age or older.

There were 4,369 housing units, of which 7.0% were vacant. The homeowner vacancy rate was 2.0% and the rental vacancy rate was 6.8%.

98.5% of residents lived in urban areas, while 1.5% lived in rural areas.

Racial composition as of the 2020 census
Race	Number	Percent
White	6,766	84.3%
Black or African American	61	0.8%
American Indian and Alaska Native	168	2.1%
Asian	210	2.6%
Native Hawaiian and Other Pacific Islander	19	0.2%
Some other race	214	2.7%
Two or more races	586	7.3%
Hispanic or Latino (of any race)	501	6.2%

[Note: The Sequim School District serves a total district population of around 34,119 people, with student enrollment typically hovering around 2,600-2,700 across its six schools.]

=== 2010 census ===
As of the 2010 census, there were 6,606 people, 3,340 households, and 1,626 families residing in the city. The population density was 1,046.9 inhabitants per square mile (404.2/km^{2}). There were 3,767 housing units at an average density of 597.0 per square mile (230.5/km^{2}). The racial makeup of the city was 91.3% White, 0.4% African American, 1.2% Native American, 1.9% Asian, 0.1% Pacific Islander, 1.7% from other races, and 3.2% from two or more races. Hispanic or Latino people of any race were 4.8% of the population.

There were 3,340 households, of which 17.1% had children under the age of 18 living with them, 36.5% were married couples living together, 9.4% had a female householder with no husband present, 2.8% had a male householder with no wife present, and 51.3% were non-families. 45.5% of all households were made up of individuals, and 29.2% had someone living alone who was 65 years of age or older. The average household size was 1.87 and the average family size was 2.57.

The median age in the city was 57.9 years. 15.2% of residents were under the age of 18; 6.3% were between the ages of 18 and 24; 15.9% were from 25 to 44; 22.1% were from 45 to 64; and 40.4% were 65 years of age or older. The gender makeup of the city was 44.4% male and 55.6% female.

== Economy ==
The U.S. Department of Energy maintains a marine laboratory on Sequim Bay that is operated by the Pacific Northwest National Laboratory. Mervin Manufacturing, a producer of snowboards, has a 60,000-square-foot (5,600 m^{2}) factory in Sequim that opened in 1995.

=== Tourism ===
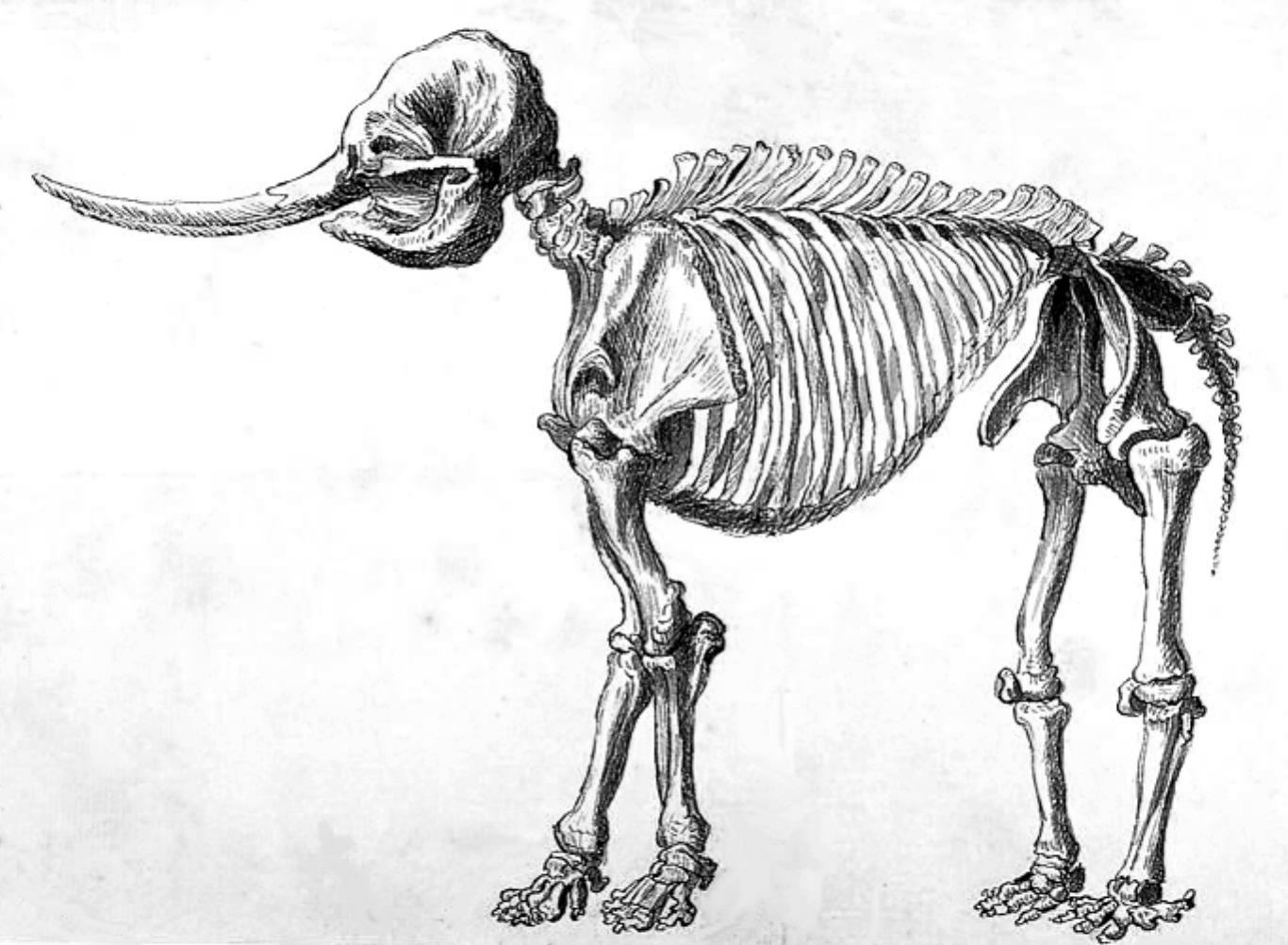
Drawing of a mastodon skeleton by Rembrandt Peale

The Dungeness National Wildlife Refuge is located just north of the city, near the mouth of the Dungeness River. It includes the Dungeness Spit and a five-mile (8 km) hike to the New Dungeness Lighthouse at the end of the spit. To the east along U.S. Route 101 is Sequim Bay, a 4-mile (6.5 km) long inlet from the Strait of Juan de Fuca. Along the western stretch is the Sequim Bay State Park. The inlet is a popular birdwatching area.

The Museum and Arts Center features both natural and cultural exhibits, including a mastodon mural mounted with the remaining mastodon bones, artifacts, and a video on the excavation.

== Government ==
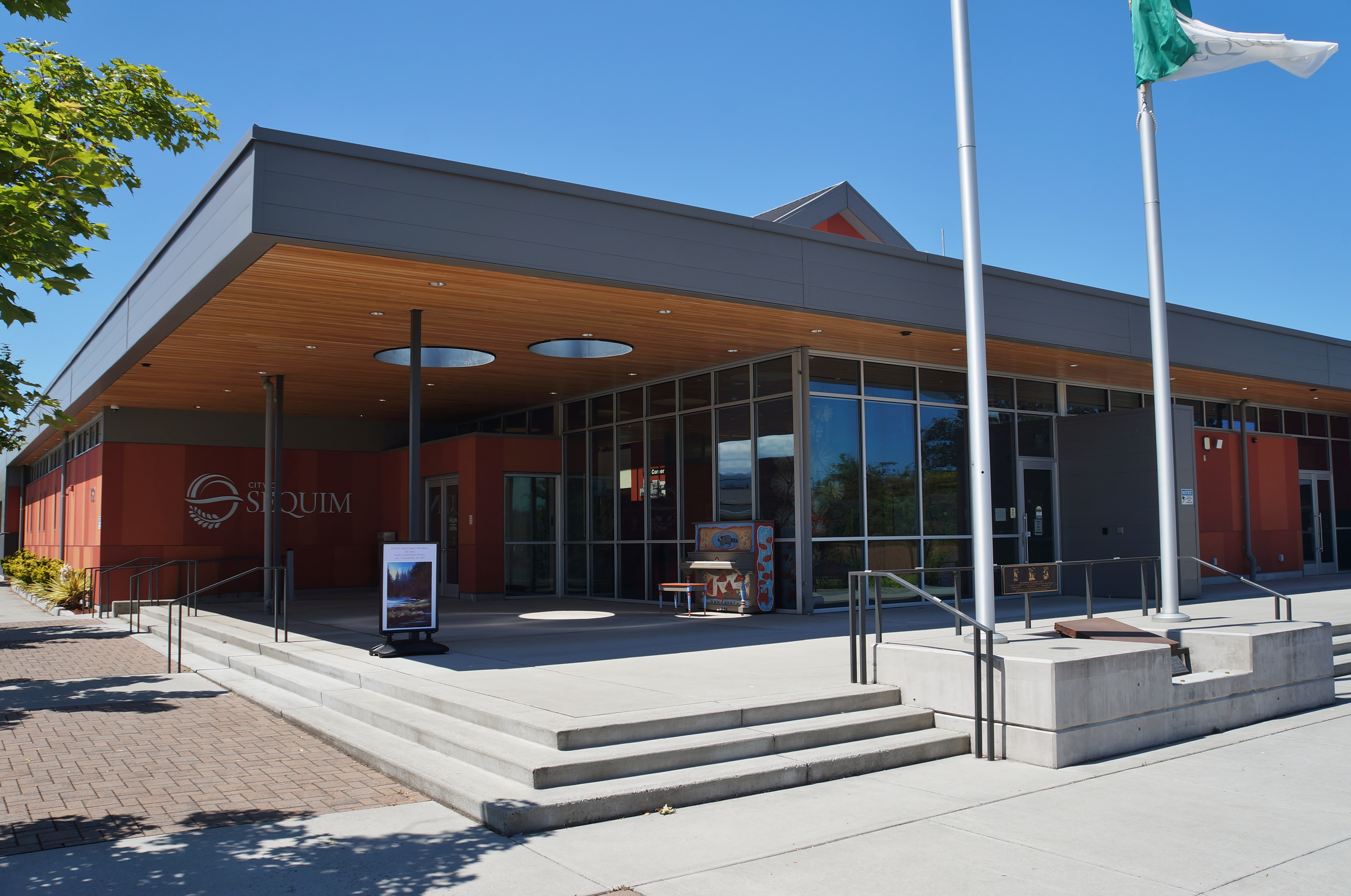
Sequim's city hall

Sequim has had a council–manager government since a 1995 referendum was approved by city residents. The city council has seven members who each serve a four-year term and are elected at-large. The city council appoints a ceremonial mayor to preside over meetings during a two-year term and approves the hiring of a city manager as head of the municipal government's departments. Councilmember Brandon Janisse was elected as mayor in January 2024. Matt Huish has been the city manager since his hiring in November 2021.

At the federal level, the city lies within the 6th congressional district, which encompasses the entire Olympic Peninsula, the neighboring Kitsap Peninsula, and part of Tacoma. Sequim is part of the state's 24th legislative district, which includes most of the Olympic Peninsula except for Mason County. The city is represented in the Clallam County Commission as part of the 1st district, which includes most areas east of the Dungeness River.

== Arts and culture ==
=== Festivals and events ===
Sequim holds its annual Irrigation Festival in early May. It was first held on May 1, 1896, to commemorate the first anniversary of an irrigation system on the Dungeness River and is the longest continually running festival in the state, reaching its 130th edition in 2025. The festival includes a street parade, concerts, live entertainment and performances, arts and crafts, a car show, and a fashion show for clothing made with recycled materials.

Other annual festivals include the Sunshine Festival, which began in 2020 and is held in March, and the Sequim Lavender Weekend, held in July since 1997.

=== Library ===
The city is part of the North Olympic Library System (NOLS), which serves Clallam County. Sequim had its own library that was established in the 1910s and moved into the Clyde Rhodefer Memorial Library in 1936. The new library, named for the first Clallam County casualty in World War I, was opened in November 1936 and was constructed by the federal Public Works Administration. The Clallam County Rural Library District, the predecessor to NOLS, acquired the branch in 1947. It was replaced with a modern building near Sequim High School in 1983. The Sequim branch later became too small for the growing city and was proposed for replacement in a 2001 study; it was renovated in 2009 and a replacement was to be funded by a bond measure in 2018 that failed to pass with the required supermajority. The state government awarded a grant in 2020 for the replacement library project, which broke ground in 2024. It is scheduled to open in 2025 and cost $10.6 million; funding from the state government was supplemented by private donations.

== Education ==
The Sequim School District provides public K–12 education to pupils in the city and surrounding area, which includes a portion of northeastern Jefferson County. During the 2023–24 school year, the district had 2,613 total students and 145 teachers or instructors. It has one high school, one middle school, two elementary schools, and one alternative school.

A private school, the Five Acre School, was established in 1995 at a rural property near Sequim and holds classes for students through the sixth grade. It became a non-profit organization in 2019.

== Media ==
=== Film and television ===
Due to a social media post, students from the rotary club of Sequim High School were able to procure a film screening of The Boys in the Boat, a movie centered around Joe Rantz and his gold-medal 1936 Summer Olympics rowing team. The 2023 motion picture, directed by George Clooney, was planned to be shown at a school auditorium as the city lacks a formal movie theater. A number of students from the school district were in invited attendance at the premiere in December 2023, held at the SIFF Cinema Downtown in Seattle.

=== Newspapers ===
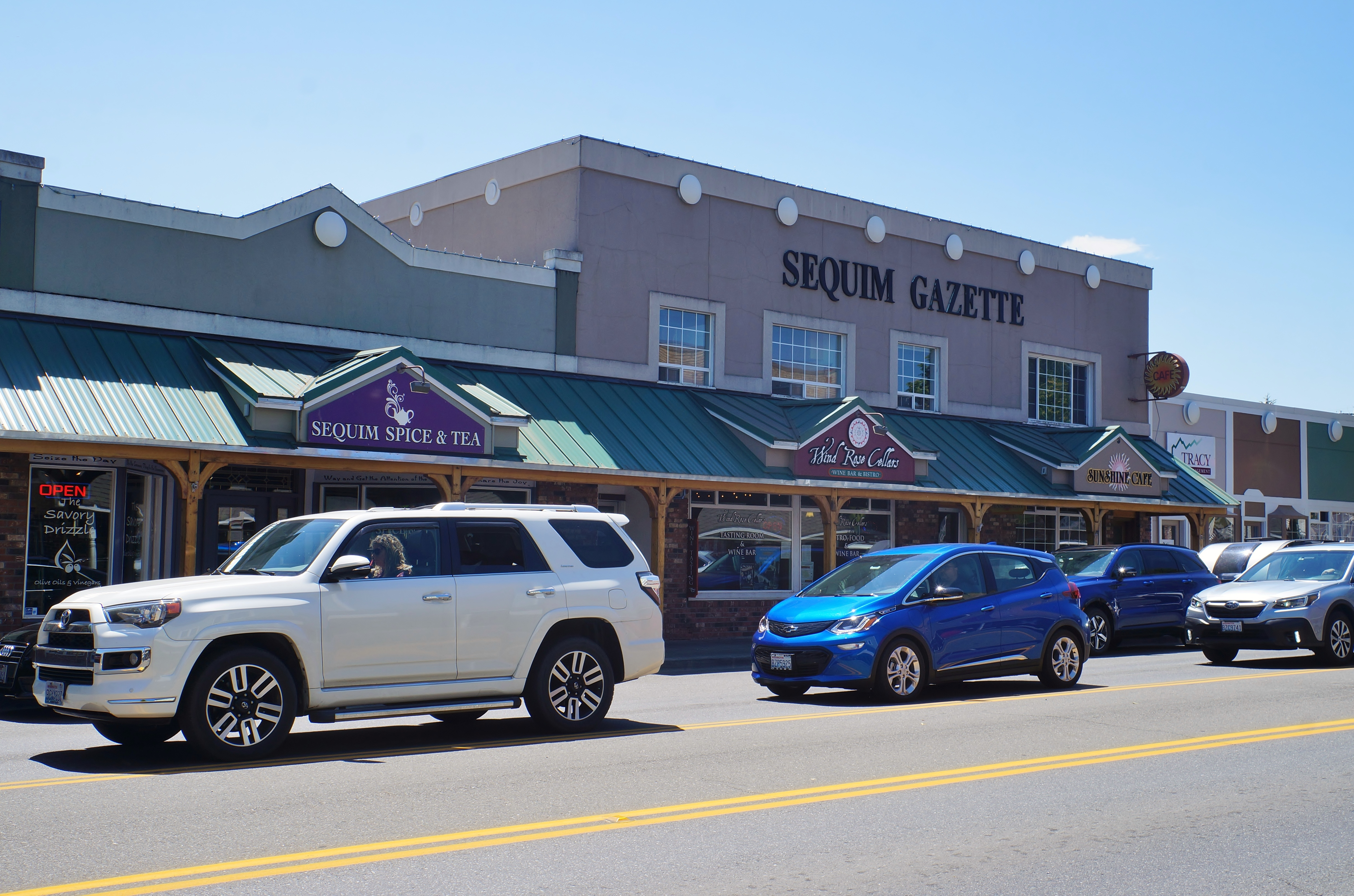
The former offices of the Sequim Gazette

A local newspaper, the Sequim Gazette, is owned by Sound Publishing and publishes weekly print editions on Wednesdays that are delivered to subscribers. Its sister newspaper Peninsula Daily News, based in Port Angeles, also covers the area and has daily print editions. The city's earliest newspaper, the Sequim Press, was founded in 1911 and ceased publication in 1985. The Gazette was originally known as the Sequim Shopper when it began publication in January 1974 and was renamed later that year to the Jimmy Come Lately Gazette. The newspaper was renamed to the Sequim Gazette on April 4, 1990, and was owned by Olympic View Publishing until it was sold to Sound Publishing in 2011.

=== Radio ===
Sequim is served by local radio stations based in the city and nearby Port Angeles, as well as broadcasts from Victoria, British Columbia. Non-commercial station KSQM debuted in 2009 and broadcasts community programming as well as music. A commercial classic rock station, KZEG, went on the air in 2018 and was originally named KZQM.

== Infrastructure ==
=== Transportation ===
Sequim is connected to nearby Port Angeles and other areas of the Olympic Peninsula by U.S. Route 101, a major highway that travels around most of the peninsula. The highway uses a 4-mile (6.4 km) bypass around the south side of the city's downtown with three interchanges. The bypass opened to traffic in August 1999 following several decades of planning to alleviate traffic congestion through Sequim. It cost $40.7 million (equivalent to $73.9 million in 2025 dollars) to construct and included the installation of warning signals triggered by the presence of nearby Roosevelt elk wearing radio collars for tracking.

The city is also served by Clallam Transit, a local fare-free bus system that connects Sequim to Port Angeles, Blyn, and Diamond Point. It also operates a microtransit service within the city. The agency operates intercity service to Poulsbo and Bainbridge Island ferry terminal on the Strait Shot, a route it launched in 2017 and still charges fares. Additional intercity service to Edmonds and Seattle is provided by the Dungeness Line, a private bus line operated by Greyhound and partially funded by the state's Travel Washington program.

A private airfield, named Sequim Valley Airport, was built northwest of the city near Carlsborg in 1983. The area was chosen for its dry climate and level terrain; a paved runway was added in 1986. The airport is primarily used for general aviation and also hosts flight instructors, hot air balloon flights, air cargo, and emergency services. It is the site of the annual Olympic Peninsula Air Affaire/Fly-In, a fly-in festival.

=== Utilities ===
Electric power for Sequim residents and businesses is provided by the Clallam County Public Utility District (PUD), a public utility that serves most of the county. Most of its electricity is purchased from the federal Bonneville Power Administration and is derived primarily from hydroelectric dams on the Columbia and Snake rivers. The PUD constructed a 30-kilowatt community solar array at its former Sequim substation in 2019 and offered direct purchases for consumers. It is planned to be expanded with a microgrid demonstration project funded with a grant from the Washington State Department of Commerce.

The city government provides tap water from three sources: an infiltration gallery on the Dungeness River and two groundwater wells. Sequim has three reservoirs that hold a combined 2.9 million US gallons (11,000,000 L) that is treated and chlorinated before use. The city maintains 72 miles (116 km) of pipes and provides approximately 800,000 US gallons (3,000,000 L) of water per day. The infiltration gallery was constructed in 1953 to replace a direct feed from the Dungeness River. The city government also operates a sewage system that collects wastewater with 73 miles (117 km) of sewer lines that lead to a sewage treatment plant that processes up to 1.67 million US gallons (6,300,000 L) per day. The wastewater is separated into reclaimed water, used for other city projects, and biosolids that are used on hay fields; a portion of the treated water is also discharged into the Strait of Juan de Fuca through an outfall pipe off the coast. The sewage system also serves the unincorporated Carlsborg area under a contract with Clallam County and the Jamestown S'Klallam Tribe's facilities in Blyn per a 2018 agreement.

Sequim contracts with Olympic Disposal, a subsidiary of Waste Connections, to provide curbside pickup of garbage, recycling, and yard waste from residents and businesses.

=== Healthcare ===
The city lies within the public hospital district for Olympic Medical Center, which has its main facilities in Port Angeles and serves most of Clallam County. Olympic Medical Center operates several clinics in Sequim, including a walk-in facility for non-emergency care and specialty facilities in the city. In 2022, the Jamestown S'Klallam Tribe opened an opioid treatment center in Sequim to serve its tribal citizens and other members of the community. The tribe plans to also construct a psychiatric hospital using funds from the state government.

== Notable people ==
- Richard B. Anderson, World War II soldier, posthumous Medal of Honor recipient
- Princess Marie-Christine of Belgium, daughter of the late Belgian King Leopold III of Belgium, half-sister of King Baudouin and Joséphine-Charlotte, Grand Duchess of Luxembourg, and aunt of the current Monarch of Belgium, King Philippe
- Bailey Bryan, country music artist
- Matthew Dryke, two-time world champion skeet shooter and Olympic gold medalist
- Dorothy Eck, Montana politician
- Hal Keller, baseball player and executive
- Donald M. Kendall, former PepsiCo CEO and political adviser
- Robbie Knievel, daredevil and stunt performer
- Jesse Marunde, 2005 World's Strongest Man runner-up
- James Henry McCourt, Wisconsin politician
- Pauline Moore, actress
- Andrew Nisbet, Jr., member of the Washington House of Representatives and Army officer
- Joe Rantz, rower and Olympic gold medalist; depicted in the book Boys in the Boat
- Jennifer Thomas, classical pianist, violinist, composer, and recording artist
- Phil Woolpert, member of the Basketball Hall of Fame and NCAA Basketball Hall of Fame

=== Musical groups ===
- Emblem3, musical group

== Sister city ==
Sequim has a sister city relationship with Shiso, Hyōgo, Japan. The city originally signed a sister city agreement in June 1993 with Yamasaki, Hyōgo, which merged with several municipalities to form Shiso in 2005. The two cities operate a short-term exchange student program through Sequim's high school and middle school.
