= Sequim Bay State Park =

State park in Washington (state), United States

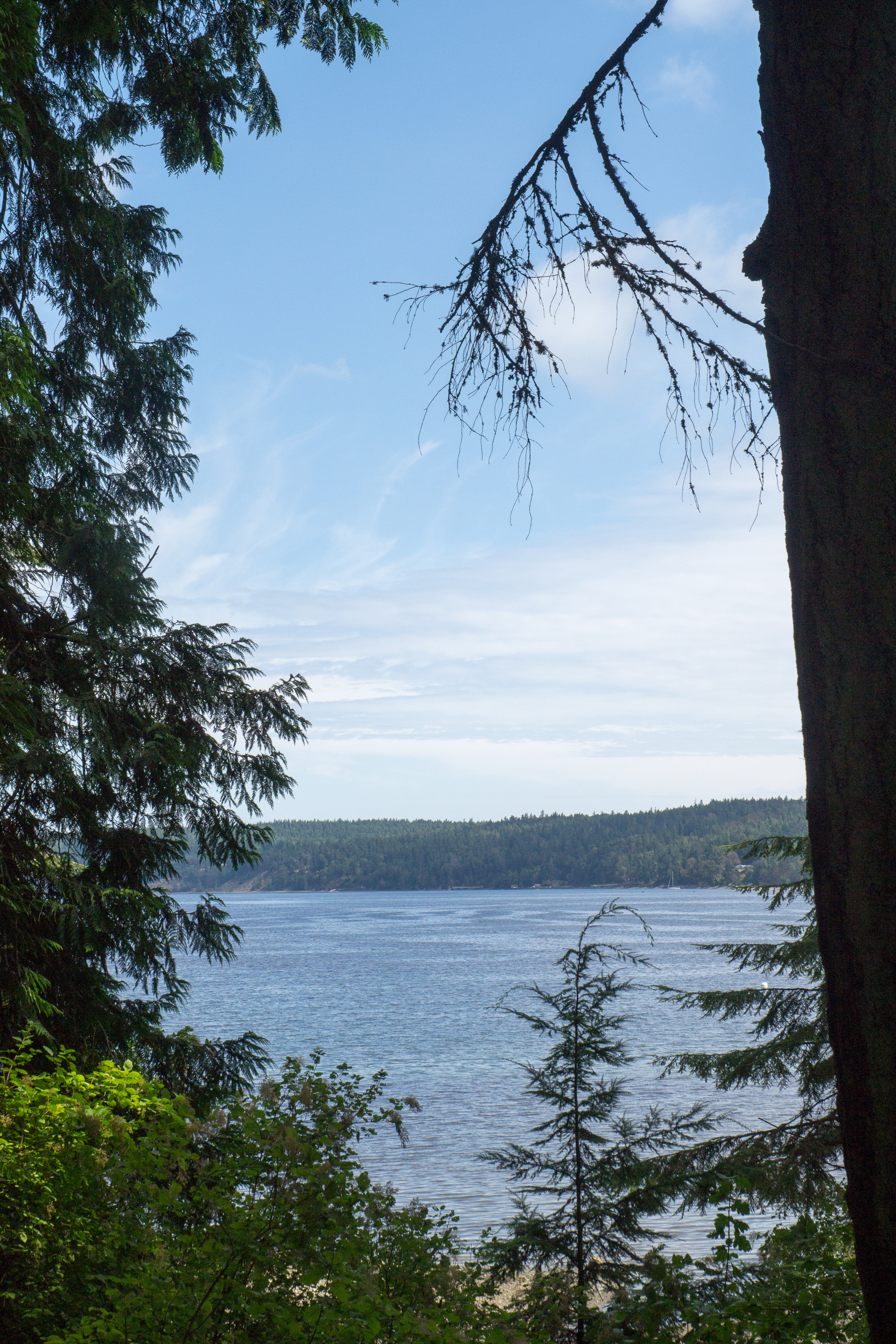
- View of Puget Sound, August 2016

- Location within Washington (state) Location within the United States
- Location: Clallam County, Washington, United States
- Coordinates: 48°02′26″N 123°01′50″W
- Area: 92 acres (37 ha)
- Elevation: 108 ft (33 m)
- Established: 1924
- Administrator: Washington State Parks and Recreation Commission
- Website: Official website

Sequim Bay State Park is a public recreation area covering 92 acres (37 ha) on the shore of Sequim Bay, on the Puget Sound side of the Olympic Peninsula in Clallam County, Washington. The state park sits within the Sequim rain shadow, has over 4,900 feet (1,500 m) of shoreline and offers picnicking, camping, hiking, boating, swimming, clam digging, crabbing, athletic fields, beachcombing, birdwatching, interpretive activities, and horseshoes.
