= Dungeness National Wildlife Refuge =

Protected area in Washington, United States

- IUCN category IV (habitat/species management area)
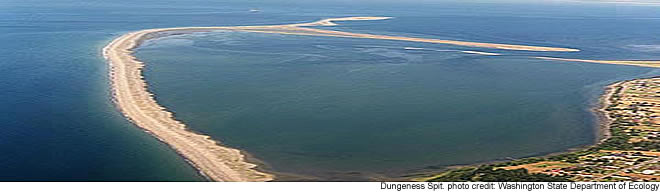
- Aerial view of Dungeness National Wildlife Refuge

- Location within Washington (state)
- Location: Clallam County, Washington, United States
- Nearest city: Sequim, Washington
- Coordinates: 48.089056°N 123.241389°W
- Area: 772.52 acres (312.63 ha)
- Established: 1915
- Governing body: U.S. Fish and Wildlife Service
- Website: Dungeness National Wildlife Refuge

The Dungeness National Wildlife Refuge is located near the town of Sequim in Clallam County in the U.S. state of Washington, on the Strait of Juan de Fuca. The refuge is composed of 772.52 acres (312.63 ha) which include Dungeness Spit, Graveyard Spit, and portions of Dungeness Bay and Harbor. Dungeness Spit is one of the world's longest natural sand spits, 6.8 miles (10.9 km) long and very narrow. A lighthouse, the New Dungeness Light, built in 1857, is located near the end of the spit. Access to Dungeness Spit is through a Clallam County Park which has hiking trails, picnic areas, and a campground. On January 20, 1915, it was designated as a National Wildlife Refuge by President Woodrow Wilson. Dungeness is one of six refuges in the Washington Maritime National Wildlife Refuge Complex.

== Wildlife and Habitat ==
The refuge provides habitat for more than 250 species of birds and 41 species of land mammals. The bay and estuary of the Dungeness River supports waterfowl, waders, shellfish, and harbor seals. Anadromous fish like Chinook, Coho, pink, and chum salmon occur in the waters of Dungeness Bay and Harbor. A number of species of waterfowl stop briefly in the Dungeness area each fall on their way south for the winter and again when they head north in the spring. Many species of waterfowl winter in the area. Dungeness Bay and Harbor support black brant, present from late October through early May, with peak numbers of approximately 3,000-5,000 in April. Shorebirds and water waders feed and rest along the water’s edge. Harbor seals haul out to rest and give birth to pups on the end of Dungeness Spit. The tideflats support crabs, clams, and other shellfish.

Dungeness NWR is recognized as an Important Bird Area by the National Audubon Society. The Refuge is internationally significant because many of the birds that stop here breed as far north as Alaska and migrate as far south as South America. The Dungeness area is additionally important as a spring staging area (a place where large groups of birds stop to build up their fat reserves for migration) for black brant and other waterfowl.

== Recreation ==
The main activities occurring on the refuge are wildlife observation and photography, and wildlife education and interpretation. To ensure that wildlife continue to have a place to rest and feed, some recreational activities such as jogging, swimming, and other beach activities are allowed only in selected areas during certain times of the year.
