= Dungeness Spit =

Sand spit jutting out into the Strait of Juan de Fuca

Coordinates: 48°10′07″N 123°08′22″W

Dungeness Spit

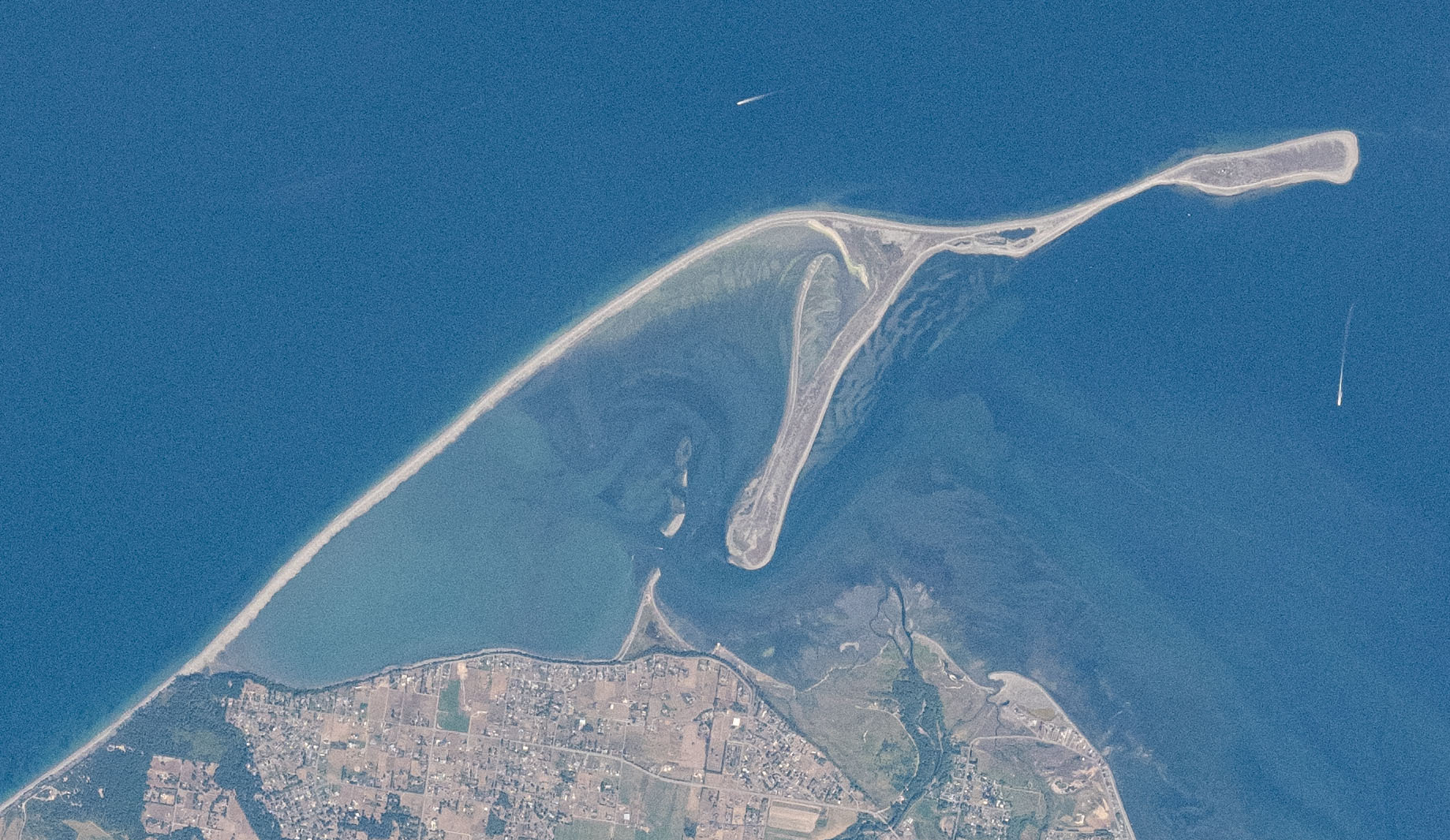
View from ISS Expedition 71, August 2024

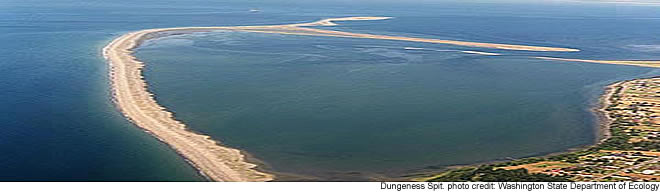
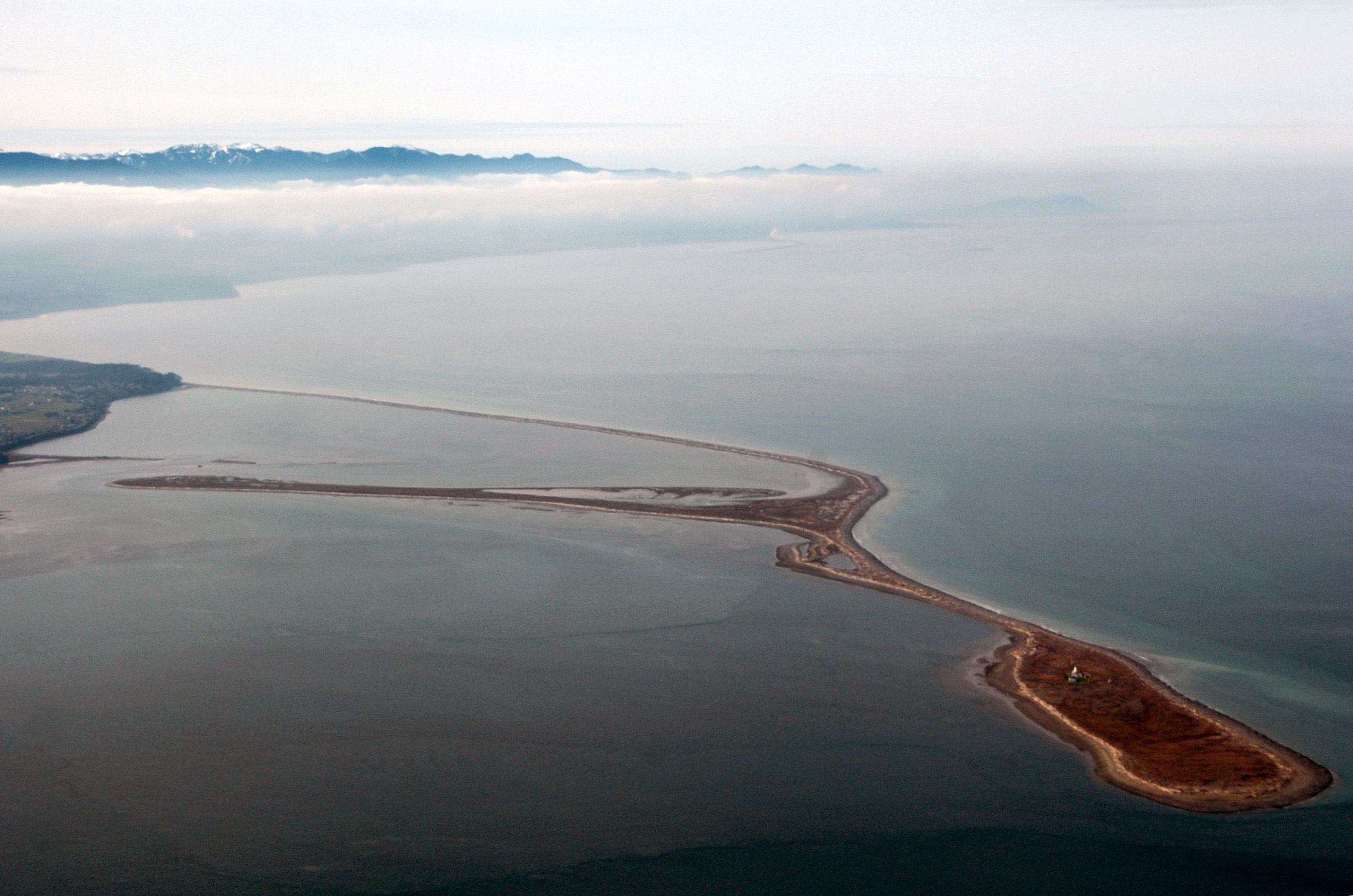
Two aerial views of Dungeness Spit. The sandbar splits into two branches as it approaches the end.

Dungeness Spit is a sand spit jutting out approximately 5 miles (8 km) from the northern edge of the Olympic Peninsula in northeastern Clallam County, Washington into the Strait of Juan de Fuca. It is the longest natural sand spit in the United States. The spit is growing in length by about 15 feet (4.6 m) per year. The body of water it encloses is called Dungeness Bay.

The Dungeness Spit is entirely within the Dungeness National Wildlife Refuge and home of the New Dungeness Lighthouse. Its land area, according to the United States Census Bureau, is 1,271,454 square meters (0.4909 sq mi, or 314.18 acres). The lighthouse once was run by United States Coast Guard, but in 1976 the agency installed an automatic light. Since 1994 the lighthouse has been staffed and maintained by the volunteer "New Dungeness Light Station Association". The spit is open to the public year around. The spit has a campground and "Dungeness Recreation Area" that is also open year-round. The campground features a 1-mile long scenic bluff trail, several miles of hiking/biking trails, and a designated equestrian trail.

The spit was first recorded by Europeans during the Spanish 1790 Quimper expedition. British explorer George Vancouver named the landform in 1792, writing "The low sandy point of land, which from its great resemblance to Dungeness in the British Channel, I called New Dungeness." He named it after the Dungeness headland in England.

In December 2001 a heavy winter storm forced water over the spit. The next morning the spit was split in three places, and vehicles supplying the lighthouse were not able to traverse the spit for about a month.

The New Dungeness Lighthouse located at the end of the spit

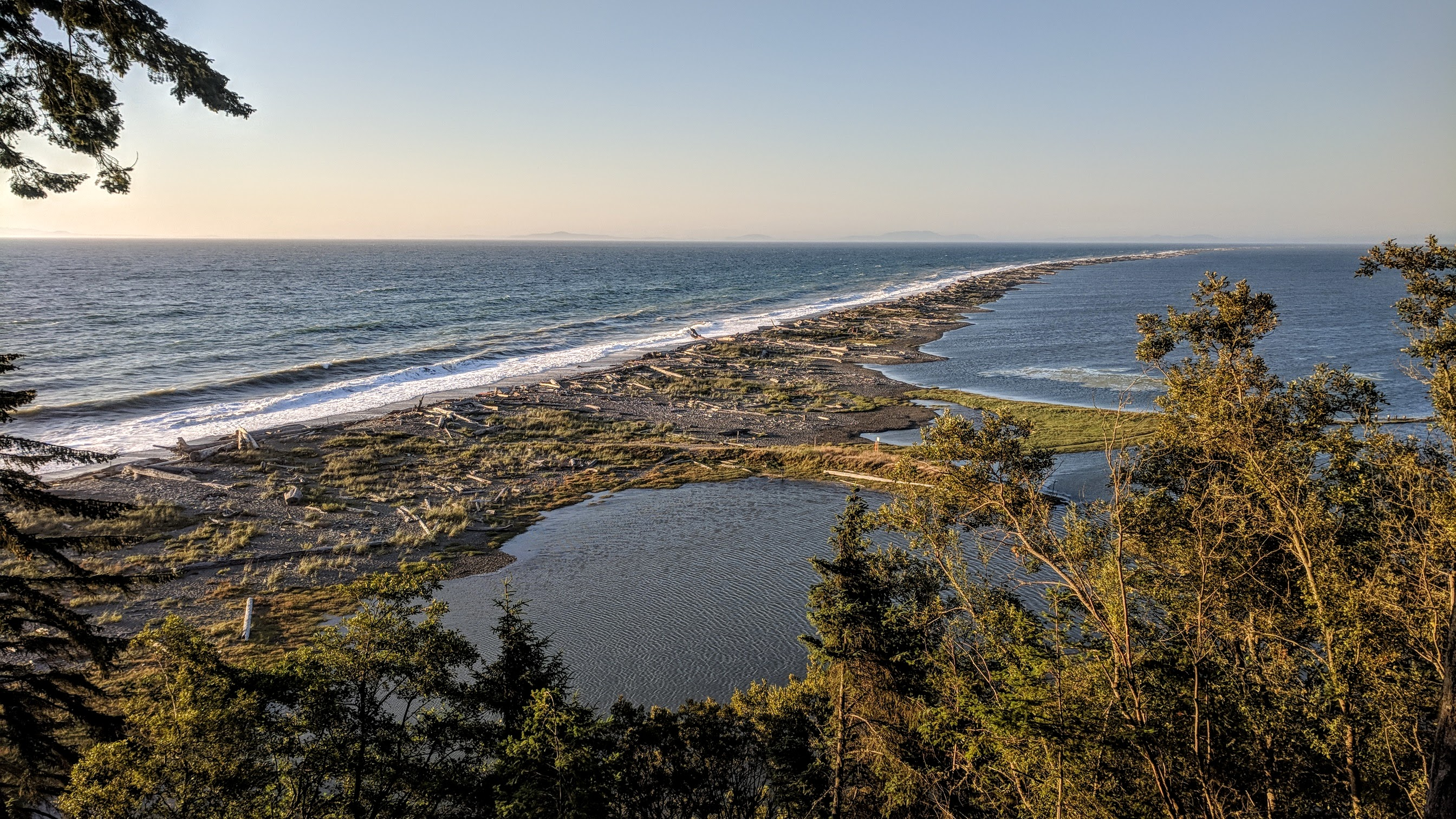
View of the spit from the second viewing platform on the short trail from the parking area at the Dungeness National Wildlife Refuge

== See also ==
- Dungeness River
- Dungeness crab
- Ediz Hook
