= Maple Grove =

Maple Grove may refer to:

== Places ==
=== Canada ===
- Maple Grove, Nova Scotia
- Maple Grove, Ontario (disambiguation), several locations
- Maple Grove, Quebec

=== United States ===
- Maple Grove, California, a place in California
- Maple Grove, Illinois
- Maple Grove, Benzie County, Michigan, a census-designated place
- Maple Grove, Minnesota, a city
- Maple Grove, Missouri, an unincorporated community
- Maple Grove (Poughkeepsie, New York)
- Maple Grove, Ohio, an unincorporated community
- Maple Grove, Berks County, Pennsylvania
- Maple Grove, Utah, a former populated place in the west side of the Round Valley in eastern Millard County at base of the Pahvant Range
- Maple Grove, Washington
- Maple Grove, Wisconsin (disambiguation), multiple locations

== Other uses ==
- Maple Grove (St. Joseph, Missouri), a historic house
- Maple Grove Raceway, a dragstrip in Mohnton, Pennsylvania

== See also ==
- Maple Grove Township (disambiguation)
- Sugar bush, a type of grove for farming maple for sugar/syrup
