= Ozette =

Ozette may refer to:

- Ozette Indian Village Archeological Site, the site of an archaeological dig in Washington in the United States
- Ozette Lake, a lake in the state of Washington in the United States
- Ozette River, a stream in the state of Washington in the United States
- USS Ozette, the name of more than one United States Navy ship
