= Sekiu =

Sekiu may refer to:

- Sekiu, Washington, a CDP (census designated place).
- Sekiu Airport, near the CDP.
- Sekiu River, also near the CDP.
