= Big River (Washington) =

- Location of the mouth of the Big River in Washington Big River (Washington) (the United States)

Location
- Country: United States
- State: Washington
- County: Clallam

Physical characteristics
- Source: Olympic Mountains
  - coordinates: 48°13′49″N 124°28′56″W
- Mouth: Ozette Lake
  - coordinates: 48°6′58″N 124°36′20″W
  - elevation: 33 ft (10 m)

The Big River is a Big River on the Olympic Peninsula in the U.S. state of Washington. A principal tributary of the Ozette River, the Big River originates in the northwestern Olympic Mountains and empties into the Ozette Lake.

== Course ==
The Big River originates in the northwestern portion of Olympic Peninsula and flows generally south and west. Its source is near Sekiu Mountain, close to the source of the South Fork Sekiu River. The Big River flows south, collects the tributary Boe Creek, then flows southwest by the small town of Royal. It collects Solberg Creek, Trout Creek, and Durham Creek before entering Olympic National Park and emptying into Swan Bay, part of Ozette Lake. The lake's outlet, the Ozette River, empties into the Pacific Ocean.

== See also ==
- List of rivers of Washington (state)
