= Maple Grove Township, Minnesota =

Maple Grove Township is the name of some places in the U.S. state of Minnesota:

- Maple Grove Township, Becker County, Minnesota
- Maple Grove Township, Crow Wing County, Minnesota

See also: Maple Grove Township (disambiguation)
