= Ozette River =

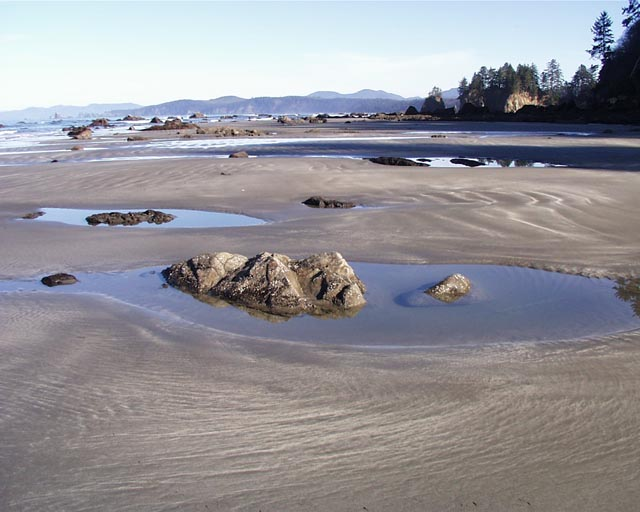

- Location of the mouth of the Ozette River in Washington

Location
- Country: United States
- State: Washington
- County: Clallam

Physical characteristics
- Source: Olympic Mountains
  - coordinates: 48°9′11″N 124°40′7″W
- Mouth: Pacific Ocean
  - coordinates: 48°10′53″N 124°42′34″W

The Ozette River is a stream on the Olympic Peninsula in the U.S. state of Washington. It originates in the northwestern Olympic Mountains and empties into the Pacific Ocean.

== Course ==
The Ozette River originates in the northwestern portion of Olympic Peninsula at the north end of Ozette Lake at the town of Ozette. It flows generally northwest, emptying into the Pacific just north of Cape Alava. Its course passes through the Ozette Indian Reservation and Olympic National Park. The principal tributary of the Ozette River, via Ozette Lake, is the Big River.

== See also ==
- List of rivers of Washington (state)
