= River Road, Washington =

- Census-designated place
- Location of River Road, Washington
- Coordinates: 48°04′07″N 123°07′29″W
- Country: United States
- State: Washington
- County: Clallam

Area
  - Total: 0.33 sq mi (0.85 km^{2})
  - Land: 0.33 sq mi (0.85 km^{2})
  - Water: 0 sq mi (0.0 km^{2})
- Elevation: 318 ft (97 m)

Population (2020)
  - Total: 495
  - Density: 1,500/sq mi (580/km^{2})
- Time zone: UTC-8 (Pacific (PST))
  - Summer (DST): UTC-7 (PDT)
- ZIP Code: 98382
- Area code(s): 360, 564
- FIPS code: 53-58777
- GNIS feature ID: 2409183

River Road is a census-designated place (CDP) in Clallam County, Washington, United States. As of the 2020 census, River Road had a population of 495. It is a primarily residential area next to the city of Sequim.

== Geography ==
River Road is located southwest of Sequim which borders the River Road community to the north, east, and south. U.S. Route 101, a two-lane freeway at this point, passes just north of the CDP, leading west into Carlsborg.

According to the United States Census Bureau, the River Road CDP has a total area of 0.33 square miles (0.85 km^{2}), all of it land. The CDP lost approximately half of its area to the city of Sequim between 2000 and 2010.

== Demographics ==
Historical population
Census	Pop.	Note	%±
2000	450		—
2010	454		0.9%
2020	495		9.0%
U.S. Decennial Census; 1990 2000 2010

River Road first appeared as a census designated place in the 2000 U.S. census.

=== Racial and ethnic composition ===
River Road CDP, Washington – Racial and ethnic composition Note: the US Census treats Hispanic/Latino as an ethnic category. This table excludes Latinos from the racial categories and assigns them to a separate category. Hispanics/Latinos may be of any race.
Race / Ethnicity (NH = Non-Hispanic)	Pop 2000	Pop 2010	Pop 2020	% 2000	% 2010	% 2020
White alone (NH)	400	389	396	88.89%	85.68%	80.00%
Black or African American alone (NH)	2	1	0	0.44%	0.22%	0.00%
Native American or Alaska Native alone (NH)	9	17	17	2.00%	3.74%	3.43%
Asian alone (NH)	15	2	16	3.33%	0.44%	3.23%
Native Hawaiian or Pacific Islander alone (NH)	0	0	0	0.00%	0.00%	0.00%
Other race alone (NH)	0	0	4	0.00%	0.00%	0.81%
Mixed race or Multiracial (NH)	10	21	38	2.22%	4.63%	7.68%
Hispanic or Latino (any race)	14	24	24	3.11%	5.29%	4.85%
Total	450	454	495	100.00%	100.00%	100.00%

=== 2020 census ===
As of the 2020 census, there were 495 people, 228 housing units, and 280 families in the CDP. There were 400 White people, 0 African Americans, 17 Native Americans, 17 Asians, 14 people from some other race, and 47 people from two or more races. 24 people had Hispanic or Latino origin.

The ancestry in River Road was 12.1% English, 6.8% Irish, 5.9% German, 2% Norwegian, and 2% Scottish.

The median age was 53.9 years old. A total of 24.2% of the population was older than 65, with 12.2% between the ages of 65 and 74, 1.1% between the ages of 75 and 84, and 10.9% older than 85. A total of 16.2% of the population were foreign born.

The median household income was $128,962. A total of 3.3% of the population were under the poverty line, with 6.1% of the population between the ages of 18 and 64 being in poverty.

=== 2000 census ===
As of the census of 2000, there were 450 people, 178 households, and 134 families residing in the CDP. The population density was 724.0 people per square mile (279.5 people/km^{2}). There were 192 housing units at an average density of 308.9 per square mile (119.3/km^{2}). The racial makeup of the CDP was 90.22% White, 0.44% African American, 2.00% Native American, 3.78% Asian, 0.89% from other races, and 2.67% from two or more races. Hispanic or Latino of any race were 3.11% of the population.

There were 178 households, out of which 30.3% had children under the age of 18 living with them, 65.2% were married couples living together, 8.4% had a female householder with no husband present, and 24.7% were non-families. 19.7% of all households were made up of individuals, and 9.6% had someone living alone who was 65 years of age or older. The average household size was 2.53 and the average family size was 2.90.

In the CDP, the age distribution of the population shows 22.9% under the age of 18, 6.7% from 18 to 24, 21.6% from 25 to 44, 24.0% from 45 to 64, and 24.9% who were 65 years of age or older. The median age was 44 years. For every 100 females, there were 89.1 males. For every 100 females age 18 and over, there were 93.9 males.

The median income for a household in the CDP was $35,893, and the median income for a family was $46,875. Males had a median income of $36,071 versus $15,500 for females. The per capita income for the CDP was $18,142. None of the families and 3.4% of the population were living below the poverty line, including no under eighteens and 5.6% of those over 64.
