= USS Ozette =

USS Ozette has been the name of more than United States Navy ship, and may refer to:

- USS Ozette (ID-3985), a cargo ship launched in 1918 but never commissioned
- USS Ozette (YTB-541), later YTM-541, a tug commissioned in 1945 and disposed of by transfer in 1974
