= USS Ozette (YTB-541) =

Tugboat of the United States Navy

History

United States
- Name: USS Ozette
- Namesake: Ozette Lake and a Makah Indian reservation in Washington
- Builder: Consolidated Shipbuilding Corporation, Morris Heights, the Bronx, New York
- Laid down: 20 February 1945
- Launched: 14 May 1945
- Commissioned: 31 October 1945
- Reclassified: From large harbor tug (YTB-541) to medium harbor tug (YTM-541), February 1962
- Fate: Transferred 1 February 1974

General characteristics
- Type: Harbor tug
- Displacement: 310 tons
- Length: 101 ft (31 m)
- Beam: 28 ft (8.5 m)
- Draft: 9 ft 7 in (2.92 m)
- Speed: 12 knots

USS Ozette (YTB-541), later YTM-541, was a United States Navy harbor tug commissioned in 1945 and in service until ca. 1974.

Ozette was laid down by Consolidated Shipbuilding Corporation at Morris Heights in the Bronx, New York, on 20 February 1945 and launched on 14 May 1945. She was commissioned as large harbor tub USS Ozette (YTB-541) on 31 October 1945.

Assigned to the 1st Naval District at Boston, Massachusetts, Ozette provided harbor services there until 1949, when she was reassigned to the Advanced Bases, Atlantic, an area of operation that kept her busy until 1958 when she returned to Boston.

Ozette was reclassified as a medium harbor tug and redesignated YTM–541 in February 1962.

Ozette continued to operate at Boston into at least 1970.

[1970-1974]

According to the Naval Vessel Register, Ozette's Navy career ended when she was "disposed of by transfer to other Government Agencies, States. Schools, Sea Scouts, etc." on 1 February 1974, and her "custodian" thereafter is listed as "schools, organizations, and private enterprises," but further information on the specifics of her transfer are lacking.
