= SS Ozette =

History

United States
- Name: Ozette
- Namesake: Ozette Lake and a Makah Indian reservation in Washington
- Owner: USSB
- Operator: W. R. Grace & Co. (1919); Strachan Shipping Co. (1919–1920); Harbor & Co. (1921)
- Ordered: 5 November 1917
- Builder: Seattle North Pacific Shipbuilding Co., Seattle
- Yard number: 1
- Laid down: 19 June 1918
- Launched: 28 September 1918
- Sponsored by: Mrs. C.J. Erickson
- Commissioned: 23 April 1919
- Home port: Seattle
- Identification: US Official Number 217839; Call sign LQPF
- Fate: Broken up, 1936

General characteristics
- Type: Design 1015 ship
- Tonnage: 6,078 GRT; 4,490 NRT; 9,519 DWT
- Length: 402.5 ft (122.7 m)
- Beam: 53.0 ft (16.2 m)
- Draft: 26 ft 5 1/2 in (8.065 m) (loaded)
- Depth: 32.0 ft (9.8 m)
- Installed power: 2,800 shp
- Propulsion: Hallidie Machinery Co. steam turbine, double reduction geared to one screw
- Speed: 11 knots (13 mph; 20 km/h)
- Armament: None

Ozette was a steam cargo ship built in 1918–1919 by Seattle North Pacific Shipbuilding Company of Seattle for the United States Shipping Board as part of the wartime shipbuilding program of the Emergency Fleet Corporation (EFC) to restore the nation's Merchant Marine. The vessel was largely employed on the East Coast to Europe routes during her career before she was laid up in and eventually broken up for scrap in 1936.

== Design and construction ==
After the United States entry into World War I, a large shipbuilding program was undertaken to restore and enhance shipping capabilities both of the United States and their Allies. As part of this program, EFC placed orders with nation's shipyards for a large number of vessels of standard designs. Design 1015 cargo ship was a standard cargo freighter of approximately 9,400 tons deadweight designed by Moore Shipbuilding Co. and adopted by USSB.

Ozette was part of the order for ten vessels placed by USSB with Seattle North Pacific Shipbuilding Co. on 5 November 1917 and was laid down on 19 June 1918 and launched on 28 September 1918 (yard number 1), with Mrs. C.J. Erickson, wife of the shipyard's founder, being the sponsor. Just as with many other vessels being built for the Shipping Board, her name was picked by Mrs. Woodrow Wilson who often chose Native American words or local landmarks for naming purposes.

The ship had two main decks as well as forecastle and poop deck and was built on the Isherwood principle of longitudinal framing providing extra strength to the body of the vessel. The freighter had four main holds and also possessed all the modern machinery for quick loading and unloading of cargo from five large hatches, including ten winches and a large number of derricks. She was also equipped with wireless apparatus, had submarine signal system installed and had electrical lights installed along the decks.

As built, the ship was 402.5 feet (122.7 m) long (between perpendiculars) and 53.0 feet (16.2 m) abeam, a depth of 32.0 feet (9.8 m). Ozette was originally assessed at 6,078 GRT and 4,490 NRT and had deadweight of approximately 9,519. The vessel had a steel hull with double bottom throughout with exception of her machine compartment, and a single 2,800 shp steam turbine, double-reduction geared to a single screw propeller that moved the ship at up to 11 knots (13 mph; 20 km/h). The steam for the engine was supplied by three Foster Water Tubes fitted for both coal and oil fuel.

The sea trials were held on 2/3 April 1919 and after their successful completion the ship was turned over to the Shipping Board and officially commissioned three weeks later.

== Operational history ==
While still under construction, the freighter together with several other vessels was allocated to W.R. Grace & Co. Upon commissioning, Ozette proceeded to load a total of 7,900 tons of cargo consisting of flour and Red Cross supplies destined for either Atlantic coast or Europe. The freighter left Seattle on 10 May 1919 bound for Newport News. Shortly after leaving port, a small fire was discovered in one of the holds, and subsequently she also developed problems with her engines. As a result, the ship was forced to put into San Francisco on May 15 to assess and repair the damage. While there it was discovered that her furnace-burning equipment was defective, and alterations were ordered by local officials. The fire also caused damage to cargo of flour in her No. 3 hold estimated to be approximately US$45,000. On further investigation it was also discovered some of the flour in hold No. 2 was also damaged by smoke due to faulty bulkheads. After undergoing repairs and restocking of her cargo Ozette finally was able to leave San Francisco at the end of June. She reached the Panama Canal on July 10 where she spent about a week undergoing further repairs. The vessel finally reached Newport News on July 28 concluding her maiden voyage.

The vessel was subsequently allocated by the USSB to Daniel Ripley & Co. to serve on their Gulf Coast to Europe route. The ship was scheduled to arrive in Galveston in mid-August to load a large cargo of cotton bound for Bremen, but that allocation was cancelled shortly thereafter. Instead, Ozette was allocated to Strachan Shipping Co. to carry general cargo from East Coast to Europe. That trip, however, did not materialize and the vessel remained berthed in Newport News until early December. The ship finally sailed on December 8 with a cargo of fuel for New York, and from there she proceeded to Florida.

After loading a cargo of 4,000 tons of phosphate hard rock at Fernandina Ozette continued on to Savannah in early January 1920 where she additionally embarked 12,353 bales of cotton. Ozette cleared from Savannah on 28 January 1920 and took course to Bremen. Soon after leaving port the vessel ran aground on a bank of Savannah River and became stranded, but was quickly pulled off by US Coast Guard cutter Yamacraw and was able to resume her voyage. In the early morning of January 30 while about 150 nautical miles (280 km) east of Savannah, the freighter encountered a lone lifeboat containing chief officer and seventeen other men from steam tanker SS Mielero which broke in two and sank four days earlier. The rescued crew was taken on board the vessel, and was subsequently transferred to Mielero's sister ship SS Sucrosa who safely landed them ashore at Baltimore on February 3. Ozette meanwhile continued her trip and arrived in Germany in mid-February. After unloading her cargo, the ship sailed out and reached East coast in April of the same year.

The vessel made another similar trip in July–September 1920, loading 5,551 tons of phosphates at Jacksonville at the end of July and sailing for Hamburg reaching it in late September. Ozette returned to Charleston on November 1 and remained there until the end of January 1921 when she was ordered to Norfolk. After approximately five months of inactivity, the freighter was finally chartered to carry coal and departed on 15 June 1921 from Newport News with cargo of 7,800 tons of coal bound for England. On June 20, while about 240 nautical miles (440 km) south of Halifax, the vessel became disabled after developing problems with her boilers. She was picked up and taken in tow by another steamer, SS Asabeth, who safely brought her to Halifax on June 25. After undergoing quick repairs the vessel was able to sail out a few days later. However, on July 16 her turbines broke down and she was forced to radio for help as the problem could not be fixed at sea. Ozette eventually arrived in Portland on July 19 in tow of another American steamer, SS Henry Clay. Upon unloading her cargo and undergoing repairs, Ozette departed Southampton on August 22 and reached Norfolk on September 8 after an uneventful journey. The vessel was subsequently laid up and remained berthed at the Fort Eustis anchorage for the rest of her career.

In early September 1932 the Shipping Board decided to scrap 124 World War I era vessels in its possession, including Ozette, to alleviate significant tonnage overabundance. As a result, all the vessels were removed from the U.S. register of shipping. In October 1932 it was announced the whole lot of these vessels was sold to the Boston Iron and Metal Company of Baltimore for $1.51/ton of recoverable material which was believed at the time to be over 350,000 tons. The disposition was estimated take about three years to complete and Ozette was eventually scrapped in April 1936.
