= Crane, Washington =

Unincorporated community in Washington, United States

- Unincorporated community
- Location within Washington (state) Location within the United States
- Coordinates: 48°06′24″N 123°19′16″W
- Country: United States
- State: Washington
- County: Clallam
- Elevation: 217 ft (66 m)
- Time zone: UTC-8 (Pacific (PST))
  - Summer (DST): UTC-7 (PDT)
- ZIP code: 98362
- GNIS feature ID: 1518277

Crane is an unincorporated community in Clallam County, Washington, United States.

Crane is on the Morse Creek U.S. Geological Survey Map.
