= Clallam County Courthouse =

- U.S. National Register of Historic Places
- U.S. Historic district – Contributing property
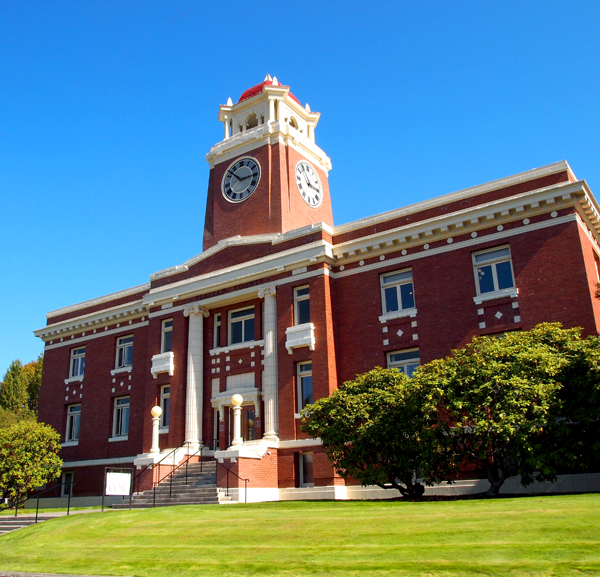
- Clallam County Courthouse

- Location within Washington (state)
- Interactive map showing the location of Clallam County Courthouse
- Location: 319 Lincoln Street, Port Angeles, Washington
- Coordinates: 48°06′57″N 123°26′00″W
- Area: less than one acre
- Built: 1914
- Built by: Sound Construction
- Architect: Francis Grant
- Architectural style: Classical Revival
- Part of: Port Angeles Civic Historic District (ID11000259)
- NRHP reference No.: 87001459

Significant dates
- Added to NRHP: September 2, 1987
- Designated CP: May 4, 2011

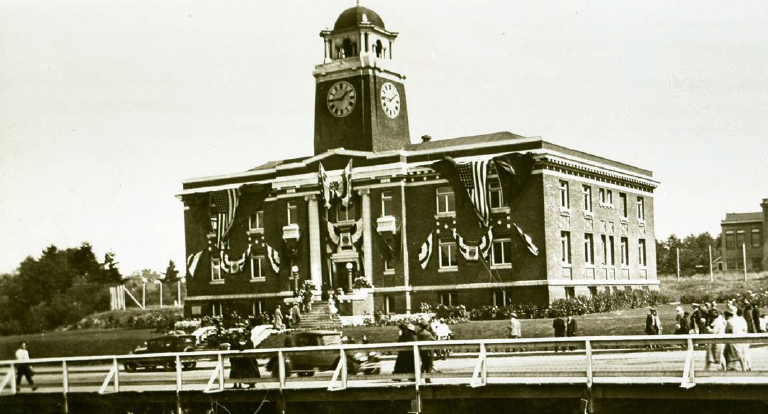
Clallam County Courthouse Dedication, 1915

The Clallam County Courthouse is located at 319 Lincoln Street in Port Angeles, Washington. It was built in 1914 and 1915, replacing an older wood courthouse built in 1892, and officially dedicated on June 14, 1915. A 1979 expansion, connected to the historic courthouse by an enclosed bridge, now houses many of the official functions, including courts, public records, and a jail. The historic courthouse houses the Clallam County Museum and the county Parks, Fair and Facilities Department.

The building was added to the National Register of Historic Places in 1987 and was added as a contributing properties to the Port Angeles Civic Historic District in 2011.

== Architecture ==
The Clallam County Courthouse is three stories high with a basement and tower and was built in the Classical Revival style. It was designed by architect Francis Grant, and built by the Sound Construction Company. The interior of the courthouse (refurbished in 1999) is arranged around an atrium, open to a second floor balcony, and lit by leaded glass skylights. The atrium is faced with marble and scagliola plaster; double curved stairs at each end lead up to the second floor. The county jail was originally located in the courthouse basement.

One hundred and twenty-six solar panels are mounted on the roof. The panels, originally installed in 1979, were replaced in 2011, and generate approximately one-fifth of the power consumed by the facility.

== Tower ==
The courthouse features a combination bell tower/clock tower that rises to 82 feet (25 m) above ground level. The tower clock was manufactured by the E. Howard & Co. of Boston and installed in 1915 by Joseph Mayer, a Seattle clockmaker and jeweler. The massive clock system (the four faces are each 8 feet 4 inches (2.54 m) in diameter) was not originally intended for Clallam County. It was manufactured in 1880 and shipped all the way around Cape Horn to Seattle. However, no buyer claimed it, and the clock was subsequently warehoused at the Seattle docks for 29 years. Discovered in storage by architect Francis Grant, it was purchased by the county for $5,115. When installed, it was connected to a four-foot (1.2 m) tall, one-ton iron bell. Unlike most bells, the clapper for the Clallam County Courthouse bell strikes it from the outside, rather than the inside, giving it a distinctive and less sharp tone.

The tower and clock were renovated in winter 2010–2011 as part of a $1.025 million courthouse restoration project. The Clallam County Courthouse's clock/bell tower is featured on the seal of Clallam County.
