= Clallam County, Washington =

County in Washington, United States

- County
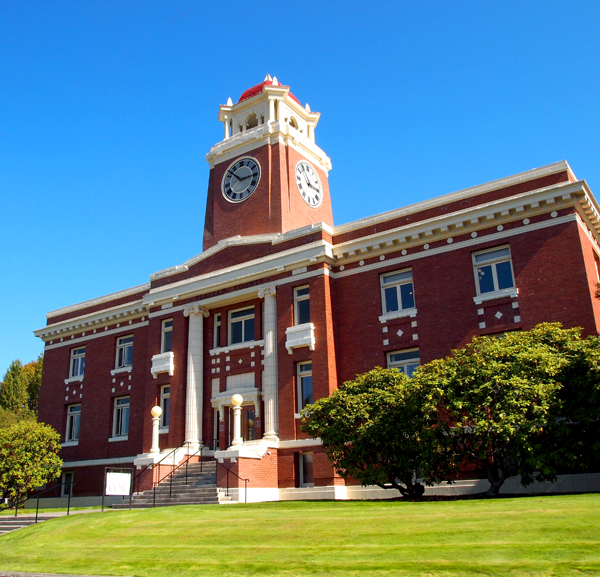
- Clallam County Courthouse in Port Angeles

- Flag Seal

- Location within the U.S. state of Washington
- Coordinates: 48°06′39″N 123°53′23″W
- Country: United States
- State: Washington
- Founded: April 26, 1854
- Seat: Port Angeles
- Largest city: Port Angeles

Area
  - Total: 2,671 sq mi (6,920 km^{2})
  - Land: 1,738 sq mi (4,500 km^{2})
  - Water: 932 sq mi (2,410 km^{2}) 35%

Population (2020)
  - Estimate (2025): 78,202 ▲
  - Density: 44.4/sq mi (17.1/km^{2})
- Time zone: UTC−8 (Pacific)
  - Summer (DST): UTC−7 (PDT)
- Congressional district: 6th
- Website: clallamcountywa.gov

Clallam County is a county in the U.S. state of Washington. As of the 2020 census, the population was 77,155, with an estimated population of 77,616 in 2023. The county seat and largest city is Port Angeles; the county as a whole comprises the Port Angeles, WA Micropolitan Statistical Area. The name is a Klallam word for "the strong people". The county was formed on April 26, 1854. Located on the Olympic Peninsula, it is south from the Strait of Juan de Fuca, which forms the Canada–US border, as British Columbia's Vancouver Island is across the strait.

Clallam County was a bellwether, voting for the winning candidate in every presidential election from 1980 to 2020, holding the longest record for predicting official presidential election winners in the entire country. It has also voted the winning candidate in every election since 1920 except for 1968, 1976, and 2024.

== Geography ==
According to the United States Census Bureau, the county has a total area of 2,671 square miles (6,920 km^{2}), of which 1,738 square miles (4,500 km^{2}) is land and 932 square miles (2,410 km^{2}) (35%) is water.

Located in Clallam County is Cape Alava, the westernmost point in both Washington and the contiguous United States, with a longitude of 124 degrees, 43 minutes and 59 seconds West (−124.733). Near Cape Alava is Ozette, the westernmost town in the contiguous United States. Clallam County also contains the west-northwesternmost, northwesternmost, and north-northwesternmost points in the contiguous United States.

=== Geographic features ===
- Mount Angeles
- Cape Flattery
- Clallam River
- Dungeness Spit
- Elwha River
- Gray Wolf Ridge
- Hoh River
- Hoko River
- Lake Crescent
- Lake Ozette
- Lyre River
- Pacific Ocean
- Pysht River
- Seven Lakes Basin
- Sol Duc Hot Springs
- Sol Duc River
- Strait of Juan de Fuca
- Tatoosh Island
- Waadah Island

=== Adjacent counties ===
- Capital Regional District, British Columbia – north
- Jefferson County – south & east
- San Juan County - north & east

=== National protected areas ===
- Pacific Northwest National Scenic Trail (part)
- Dungeness National Wildlife Refuge
- Flattery Rocks National Wildlife Refuge
- Olympic National Forest (part)
- Olympic National Park (part)
- Quillayute Needles National Wildlife Refuge (part)

== Demographics ==
Historical population
| Census | Pop. | Note | %± |
|---|---|---|---|
| 1860 | 149 | | — |
| 1870 | 408 | | 173.8% |
| 1880 | 638 | | 56.4% |
| 1890 | 2,771 | | 334.3% |
| 1900 | 5,603 | | 102.2% |
| 1910 | 6,755 | | 20.6% |
| 1920 | 11,368 | | 68.3% |
| 1930 | 20,449 | | 79.9% |
| 1940 | 21,848 | | 6.8% |
| 1950 | 26,396 | | 20.8% |
| 1960 | 30,022 | | 13.7% |
| 1970 | 34,770 | | 15.8% |
| 1980 | 51,648 | | 48.5% |
| 1990 | 56,464 | | 9.3% |
| 2000 | 64,525 | | 14.3% |
| 2010 | 71,404 | | 10.7% |
| 2020 | 77,155 | | 8.1% |
| 2025 (est.) | 78,202 | ▲ | 1.4% |
U.S. Decennial Census; 1790–1960 1900–1990; 1990–2000 2010–2020

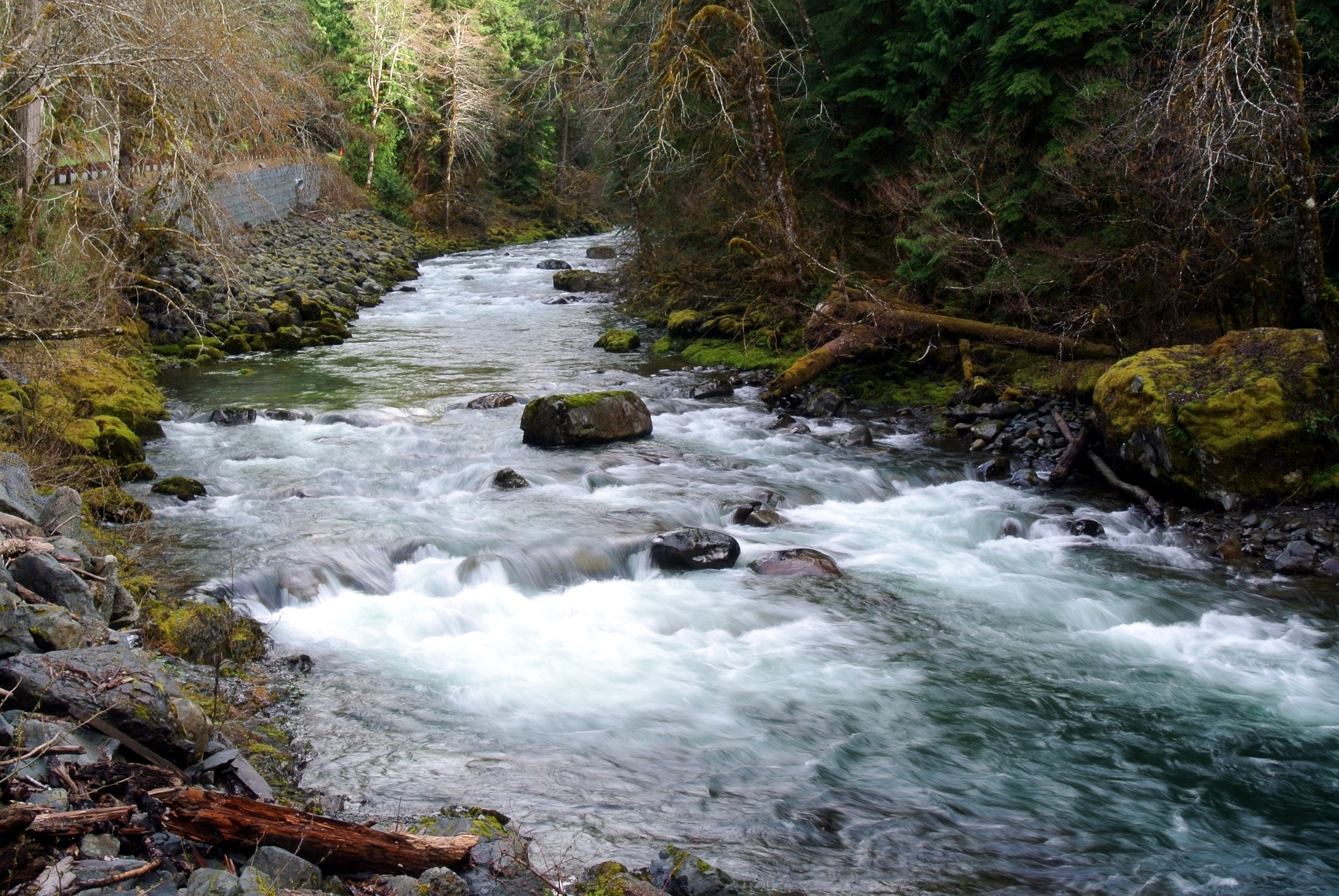
Sol Duc River

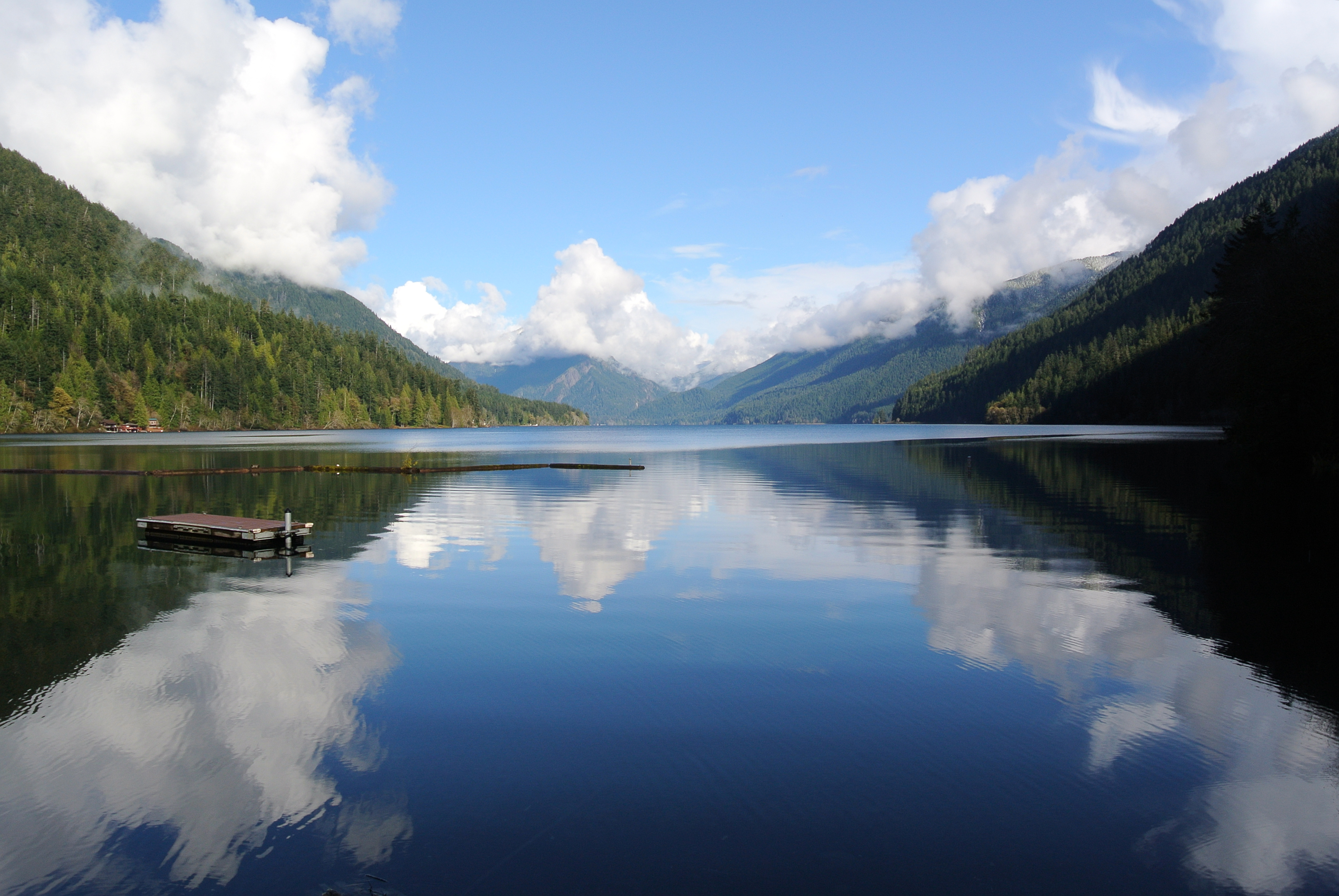
Lake Crescent

=== 2020 census ===
As of the 2020 census, the county had a population of 77,155. Of the residents, 16.3% were under the age of 18 and 32.0% were 65 years of age or older; the median age was 52.9 years. For every 100 females there were 96.9 males, and for every 100 females age 18 and over there were 95.1 males. 63.9% of residents lived in urban areas and 36.1% lived in rural areas.

The racial makeup of the county was 80.9% White, 0.8% Black or African American, 5.6% American Indian and Alaska Native, 1.6% Asian, 2.2% from some other race, and 8.7% from two or more races. Hispanic or Latino residents of any race comprised 6.1% of the population.

Clallam County, Washington – Racial and ethnic composition Note: the US Census treats Hispanic/Latino as an ethnic category. This table excludes Latinos from the racial categories and assigns them to a separate category. Hispanics/Latinos may be of any race.
| Race / Ethnicity (NH = Non-Hispanic) | Pop 2000 | Pop 2010 | Pop 2020 | % 2000 | % 2010 | % 2020 |
|---|---|---|---|---|---|---|
| White alone (NH) | 56,413 | 60,400 | 61,164 | 87.43% | 84.59% | 79.27% |
| Black or African American alone (NH) | 517 | 558 | 571 | 0.80% | 0.78% | 0.74% |
| Native American or Alaska Native alone (NH) | 3,121 | 3,326 | 3,931 | 4.84% | 4.66% | 5.10% |
| Asian alone (NH) | 728 | 993 | 1,234 | 1.13% | 1.39% | 1.60% |
| Pacific Islander alone (NH) | 99 | 86 | 113 | 0.15% | 0.12% | 0.15% |
| Other race alone (NH) | 73 | 114 | 432 | 0.11% | 0.16% | 0.56% |
| Mixed race or Multiracial (NH) | 1,371 | 2,300 | 4,978 | 2.12% | 3.22% | 6.45% |
| Hispanic or Latino (any race) | 2,203 | 3,627 | 4,732 | 3.41% | 5.08% | 6.13% |
| Total | 64,525 | 71,404 | 77,155 | 100.00% | 100.00% | 100.00% |

There were 34,113 households in the county, of which 20.2% had children under the age of 18 living with them and 27.1% had a female householder with no spouse or partner present. About 31.5% of all households were made up of individuals and 18.2% had someone living alone who was 65 years of age or older.

There were 37,930 housing units, of which 10.1% were vacant. Among occupied housing units, 73.1% were owner-occupied and 26.9% were renter-occupied. The homeowner vacancy rate was 1.2% and the rental vacancy rate was 6.4%.

=== 2010 census ===
As of the 2010 census, there were 71,404 people, 31,329 households, and 19,713 families living in the county. The population density was 41.1 inhabitants per square mile (15.9/km^{2}). There were 35,582 housing units at an average density of 20.5 units per square mile (7.9 units/km^{2}). The racial makeup of the county was 87.0% white, 5.1% American Indian, 1.4% Asian, 0.8% black or African American, 0.1% Pacific islander, 1.8% from other races, and 3.8% from two or more races. Those of Hispanic or Latino origin made up 5.1% of the population. In terms of ancestry, 21.4% were German, 16.4% were English, 12.6% were Irish, 6.5% were Norwegian, and 5.2% were American.

Of the 31,329 households, 22.7% had children under the age of 18 living with them, 49.4% were married couples living together, 9.2% had a female householder with no husband present, 37.1% were non-families, and 30.4% of all households were made up of individuals. The average household size was 2.22 and the average family size was 2.70. The median age was 49.0 years.

The median income for a household in the county was $44,398 and the median income for a family was $54,837. Males had a median income of $44,609 versus $32,125 for females. The per capita income for the county was $24,449. About 9.5% of families and 14.3% of the population were below the poverty line, including 21.4% of those under age 18 and 6.0% of those age 65 or over.

=== 2000 census ===
As of the 2000 census, there were 64,525 people, 27,164 households, and 18,064 families living in the county. The population density was 37 people per square mile (14 people/km^{2}). There were 30,683 housing units at an average density of 18 units per square mile (6.9 units/km^{2}). The racial makeup of the county was 89.12% White, 0.84% Black or African American, 5.12% Native American, 1.13% Asian, 0.16% Pacific Islander, 1.18% from other races, and 2.44% from two or more races. 3.41% of the population were Hispanic or Latino of any race. 17.2% were of German, 13.1% English, 9.3% Irish, 8.3% United States or American and 6.0% Norwegian ancestry. 95% spoke English and 3.2% Spanish as their first language.

There were 27,164 households, out of which 25.70% had children under the age of 18 living with them, 53.90% were married couples living together, 9.00% had a female householder with no husband present, and 33.50% were non-families. 28.10% of all households were made up of individuals, and 13.40% had someone living alone who was 65 years of age or older. The average household size was 2.31 and the average family size was 2.78.

In the county, the population was spread out, with 22.00% under the age of 18, 7.10% from 18 to 24, 22.80% from 25 to 44, 26.90% from 45 to 64, and 21.30% who were 65 years of age or older. The median age was 44 years. For every 100 females there were 98.70 males. For every 100 females age 18 and over, there were 96.60 males.

The median income for a household in the county was $36,449, and the median income for a family was $44,381. Males had a median income of $35,452 versus $24,628 for females. The per capita income for the county was $19,517. About 8.90% of families and 12.50% of the population were below the poverty line, including 17.10% of those under age 18 and 6.80% of those age 65 or over.

== Politics ==
Modern Clallam County tends to lean Democratic in most elections. It was previously a bellwether, holding the longest record, until 2024, for predicting official presidential election winners in the entire country. In every election since 1920, except for 1968, 1976, and 2024, it has voted for the presidential election winner. Since 2004, the county has seen a Democratic trend, and even though it flipped Republican in 2016, this was largely due to a stronger third-party presence that year. In 2020 it supported Democrat Joe Biden with a majority, and in 2024 it defied the national average when it shifted further to the left, giving Kamala Harris the best performance by a Democrat since Lyndon Johnson in 1964.

It voted the winning candidate in every presidential election from 1980 to 2020, the longest streak of any county in the country before ending its streak in 2024. Clallam County also voted for Bob Ferguson, Nick Brown, and Emily Randall in the 2024 Washington gubernatorial election, the 2024 Washington Attorney General election, and the 2024 Washington's 6th congressional district election. Ferguson won the county for the first time since the 2000 Washington gubernatorial election, despite underperforming Kamala Harris, indicating a potential leftward shift in the county.

Democratic candidates are generally most successful in the county seat and largest city, Port Angeles, which casts a significant number of votes. The city of Sequim and its general vicinity also cast a large number of votes and used to be a battleground area, but in recent years has become more Democratic, a key factor in the county's shift from a battleground to a blue county. Forks and its surrounding area have long been strongly Republican due to their isolation and resource-based economy. The Makah tribe areas around Neah Bay are some of the most Democratic areas in the state. Otherwise, with the exception of a few locations (such as Blyn and Jamestown near Sequim), unincorporated Clallam County has a strong Republican lean.

United States presidential election results for Clallam County, Washington
| Year | Republican | | Democratic | | Third party(ies) | |
| Year | No. | % | No. | % | No. | % |
|---|---|---|---|---|---|---|
| 1892 | 518 | 38.20% | 448 | 33.04% | 390 | 28.76% |
| 1896 | 559 | 43.43% | 717 | 55.71% | 11 | 0.85% |
| 1900 | 723 | 60.45% | 407 | 34.03% | 66 | 5.52% |
| 1904 | 903 | 68.15% | 273 | 20.60% | 149 | 11.25% |
| 1908 | 938 | 59.59% | 428 | 27.19% | 208 | 13.21% |
| 1912 | 727 | 28.67% | 464 | 18.30% | 1,345 | 53.04% |
| 1916 | 1,475 | 45.23% | 1,339 | 41.06% | 447 | 13.71% |
| 1920 | 1,775 | 53.76% | 489 | 14.81% | 1,038 | 31.44% |
| 1924 | 2,129 | 52.07% | 283 | 6.92% | 1,677 | 41.01% |
| 1928 | 3,319 | 65.53% | 1,705 | 33.66% | 41 | 0.81% |
| 1932 | 1,870 | 24.81% | 3,954 | 52.46% | 1,713 | 22.73% |
| 1936 | 2,404 | 28.56% | 5,586 | 66.36% | 428 | 5.08% |
| 1940 | 3,555 | 36.91% | 5,966 | 61.95% | 110 | 1.14% |
| 1944 | 3,551 | 39.23% | 5,441 | 60.11% | 59 | 0.65% |
| 1948 | 4,178 | 41.38% | 5,412 | 53.60% | 507 | 5.02% |
| 1952 | 6,442 | 53.96% | 5,390 | 45.15% | 106 | 0.89% |
| 1956 | 6,852 | 54.82% | 5,632 | 45.06% | 16 | 0.13% |
| 1960 | 6,227 | 47.61% | 6,801 | 52.00% | 52 | 0.40% |
| 1964 | 4,175 | 31.03% | 9,265 | 68.86% | 15 | 0.11% |
| 1968 | 5,921 | 41.60% | 7,030 | 49.39% | 1,283 | 9.01% |
| 1972 | 9,372 | 58.25% | 5,620 | 34.93% | 1,097 | 6.82% |
| 1976 | 9,132 | 49.67% | 8,268 | 44.97% | 986 | 5.36% |
| 1980 | 11,515 | 51.65% | 8,029 | 36.01% | 2,752 | 12.34% |
| 1984 | 13,605 | 57.32% | 9,701 | 40.87% | 429 | 1.81% |
| 1988 | 11,200 | 49.14% | 11,123 | 48.80% | 471 | 2.07% |
| 1992 | 9,765 | 34.06% | 10,820 | 37.74% | 8,088 | 28.21% |
| 1996 | 12,432 | 42.12% | 12,585 | 42.64% | 4,499 | 15.24% |
| 2000 | 16,251 | 50.42% | 13,779 | 42.75% | 2,202 | 6.83% |
| 2004 | 18,871 | 51.33% | 17,049 | 46.37% | 846 | 2.30% |
| 2008 | 18,199 | 47.25% | 19,470 | 50.55% | 850 | 2.21% |
| 2012 | 18,437 | 48.43% | 18,580 | 48.81% | 1,049 | 2.76% |
| 2016 | 18,794 | 46.37% | 17,677 | 43.61% | 4,062 | 10.02% |
| 2020 | 23,062 | 46.81% | 24,721 | 50.18% | 1,481 | 3.01% |
| 2024 | 21,632 | 44.45% | 25,440 | 52.28% | 1,591 | 3.27% |

== Transportation ==
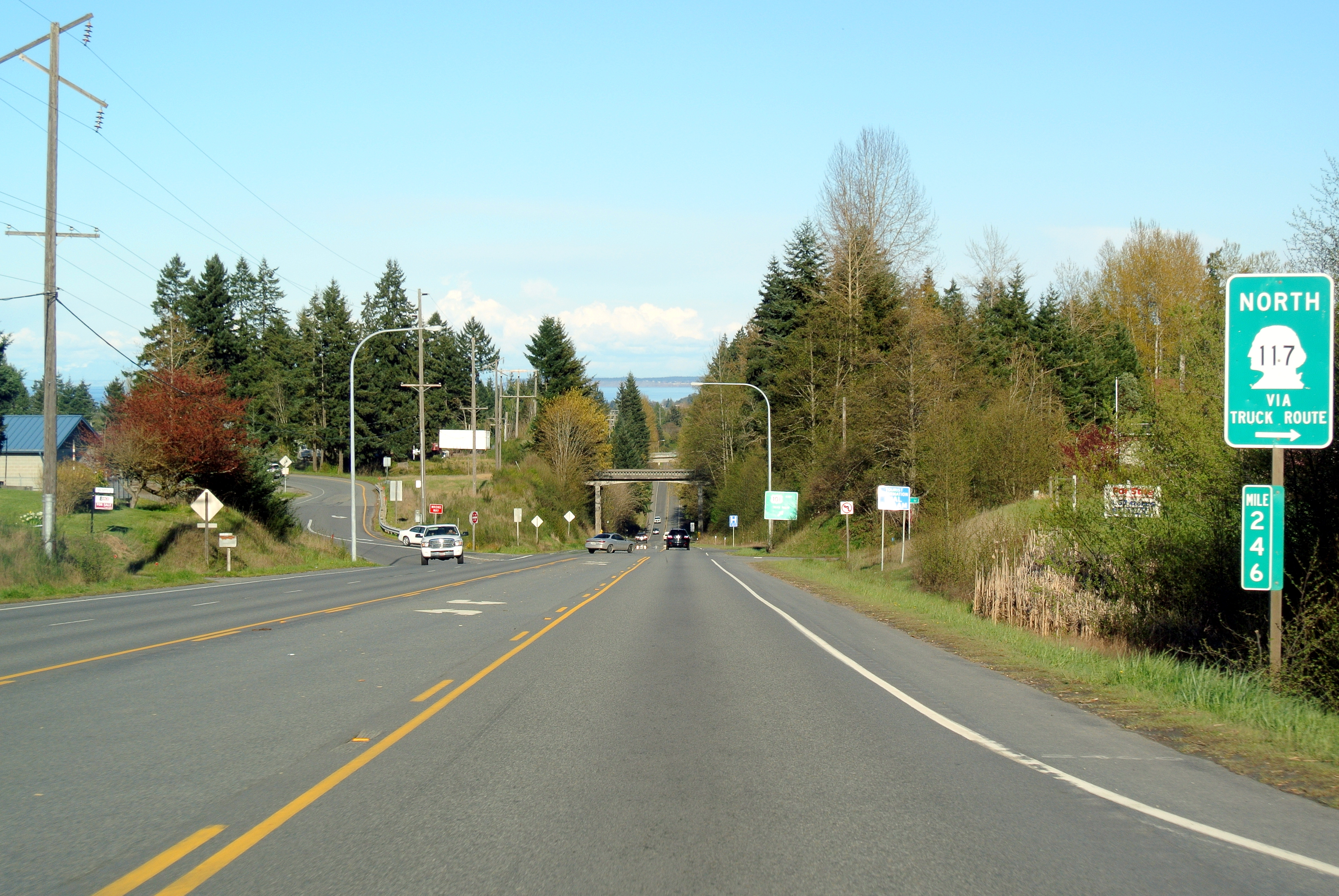
US Route 101 at the interchange with Washington State Route 117

Clallam Transit operates bus service between and within the towns of the county and to destinations outside Clallam County.

=== Major highway ===
- U.S. Route 101

=== Airports ===
The following public use airports are located in the county:

- William R. Fairchild International Airport (CLM) – Port Angeles
- Forks Airport (S18) – Forks
- Quillayute Airport (UIL) – Quillayute / Forks
- Sekiu Airport (11S) – Sekiu
- Sequim Valley Airport (W28) – Sequim

== Communities ==
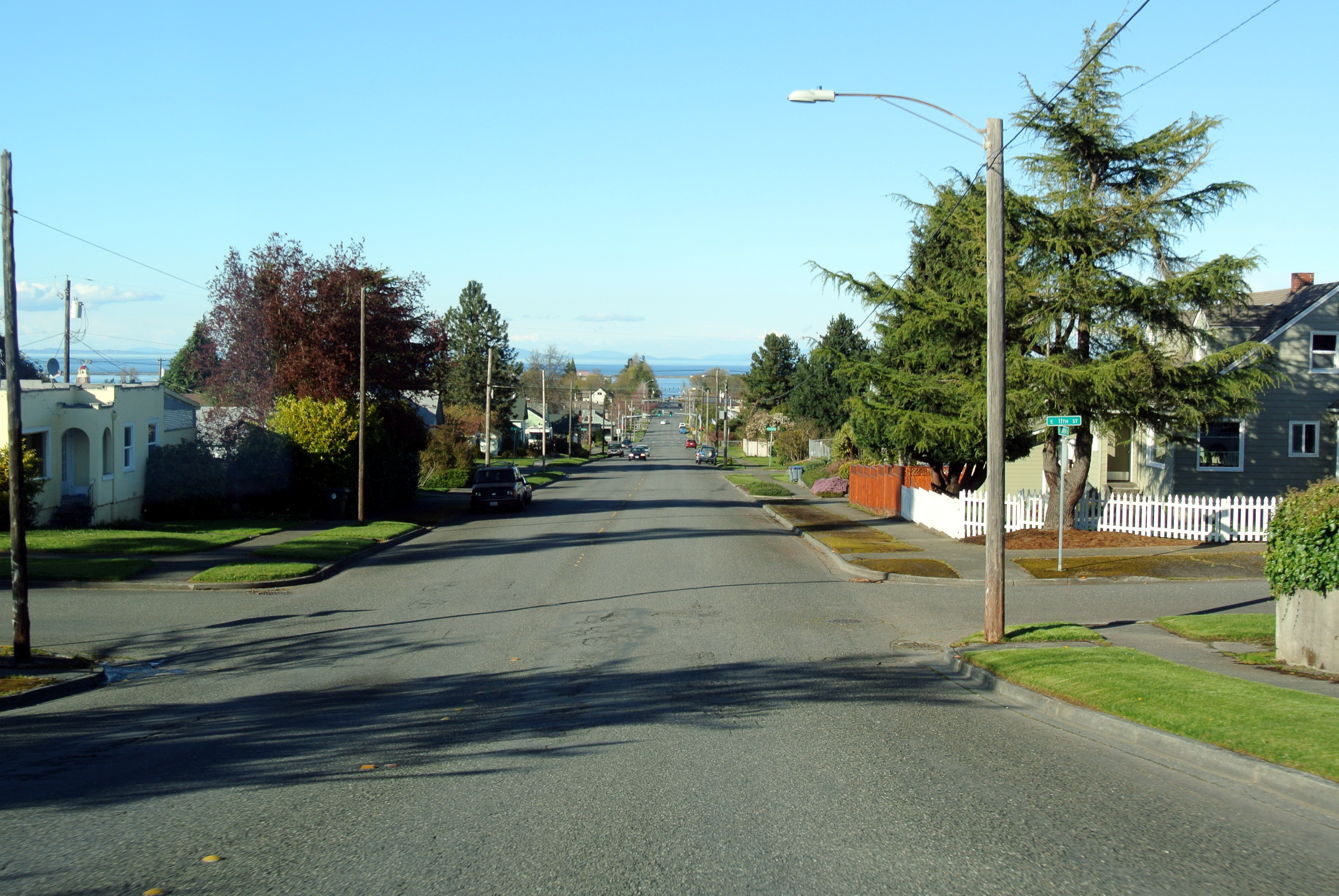
Crossroads in Port Angeles, Strait of Juan de Fuca and Vancouver Island in the background

=== Cities ===
- Forks
- Port Angeles (county seat)
- Sequim

=== Census-designated places ===
- Bell Hill
- Blyn
- Carlsborg
- Clallam Bay
- Jamestown
- Neah Bay
- Port Angeles East
- River Road
- Sekiu

=== Unincorporated communities ===
- Agnew
- Beaver
- Crane
- Diamond Point
- Dungeness
- Elwha
- Fairholm
- Joyce
- La Push
- Maple Grove
- Ozette
- Pysht
- Piedmont
- Sappho
- Schoolhouse Point

== Popular culture ==
The popular Twilight Saga novels and film series are set in Clallam County. The main storyline is set in Forks; however, the characters also visit neighboring Port Angeles.

The rural-comedy film series Ma and Pa Kettle (1949–1957) is set in a fictionalized Cape Flattery.

== See also ==
- Clallam Transit
- National Register of Historic Places listings in Clallam County, Washington
- People's Wharf Company
