= Sekiu River =

- Location in Washington

Location
- Country: United States

Physical characteristics
- Mouth
  - location: 48°17′17.2″N 124°23′40.4″W
  - elevation: 6 ft (1.8 m)
- Length: 12.5 mi (20.1 km)

The Sekiu River is a 12.5-mile (20.1 km) long river in the U.S. state of Washington. The mouth of the river empties into the Strait of Juan de Fuca from the Olympic Peninsula in Clallam County. The river has an additional 36.7 miles (59.1 km) of tributaries connected to it. The nearest town is the census-designated place (CDP) of Sekiu approximately 4.75 miles (7.6 km) east from the mouth of the Sekiu river.

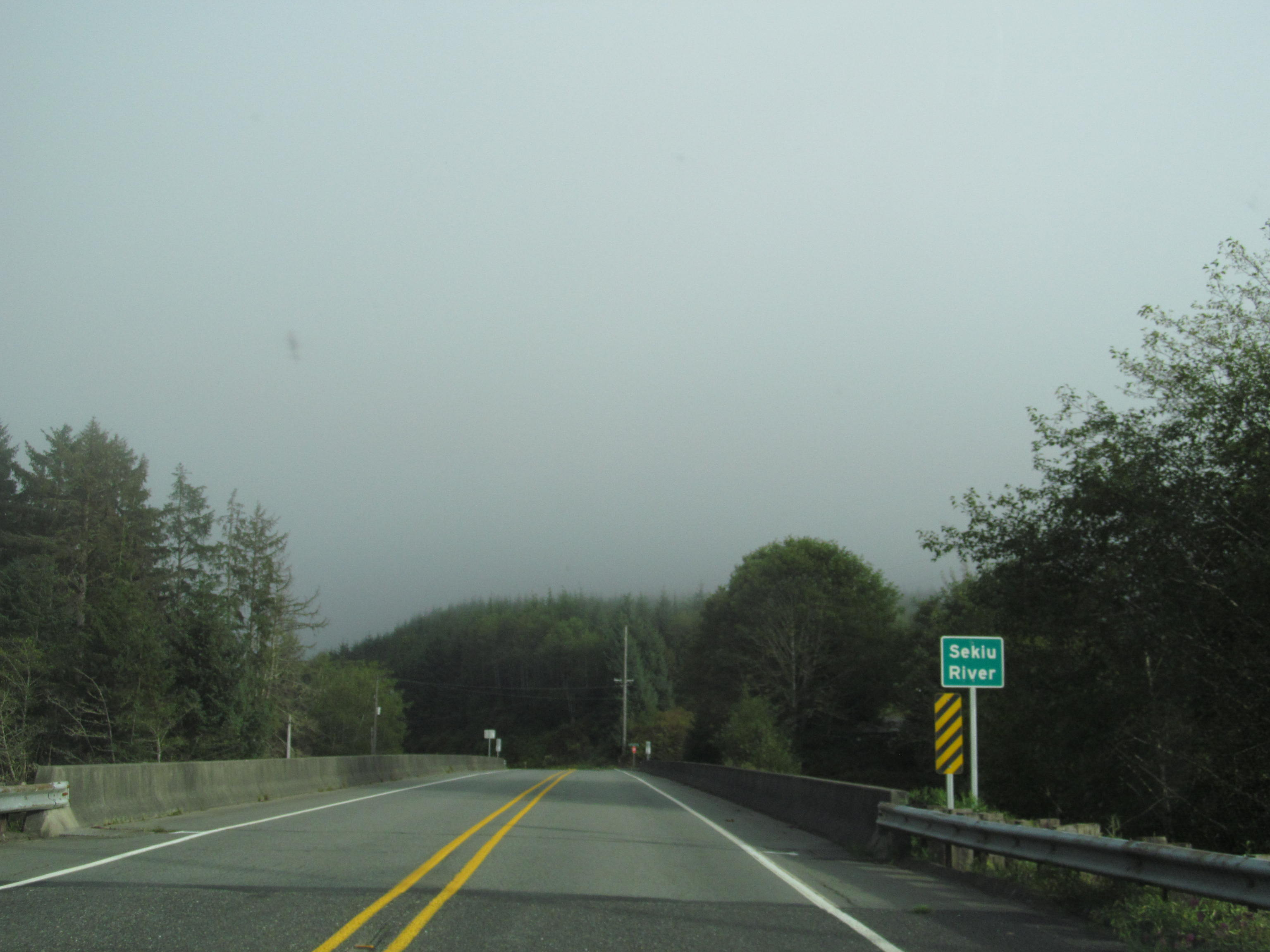
Washington State Route 112 bridge over Sekiu River

== See also ==
- List of rivers of Washington (state)
