= Port Angeles East, Washington =

- Census-designated place
- Location of Port Angeles East, Washington
- Coordinates: 48°06′27″N 123°22′14″W
- Country: United States
- State: Washington
- County: Clallam

Area
  - Total: 4.6 sq mi (12.0 km^{2})
  - Land: 3.8 sq mi (9.8 km^{2})
  - Water: 0.85 sq mi (2.2 km^{2})
- Elevation: 243 ft (74 m)

Population (2020)
  - Total: 3,159
  - Density: 830/sq mi (320/km^{2})
- Time zone: UTC-8 (Pacific (PST))
  - Summer (DST): UTC-7 (PDT)
- ZIP Code: 98362
- Area code(s): 360, 564
- FIPS code: 53-55400
- GNIS feature ID: 2409090

Port Angeles East is a census-designated place (CDP) in Clallam County, Washington, and part of the Port Angeles micropolitan area, in the United States. As of the 2020 census, Port Angeles East had a population of 3,159. This unincorporated urban growth area bordering the city of Port Angeles is known by locals as the Gales Addition.

== Geography ==
Port Angeles East CDP extends west to the Port Angeles city limits, north to the Strait of Juan de Fuca and the entrance to Port Angeles Harbor, and east across Morse Creek to Deer Park Road. U.S. Route 101 passes through the community, leading west into Port Angeles and east 14 miles (23 km) to Sequim.

According to the United States Census Bureau, the Port Angeles East CDP has a total area of 4.6 square miles (12.0 km^{2}), of which 3.8 square miles (9.8 km^{2}) is land and 0.85 square miles (2.2 km^{2}), or 18.54%, is water.

== Demographics ==
Historical population
Census	Pop.	Note	%±
1980	2,786		—
1990	2,672		−4.1%
2000	3,053		14.3%
2010	3,036		−0.6%
2020	3,159		4.1%
U.S. Decennial Census; 1970 1980 1990; 2000 2010

Port Angeles East first appeared as a census designated place in the 1980 U.S. census.

=== 2000 census ===
As of the census of 2000, there were 3,053 people, 1,345 households, and 876 families residing in the CDP. The population density was 803.5 people per square mile (310.2/km^{2}). There were 1,484 housing units at an average density of 390.6/sq mi (150.8/km^{2}). The racial makeup of the CDP was 94.76% White, 0.26% African American, 1.97% Native American, 0.52% Asian, 0.16% Pacific Islander, 0.43% from other races, and 1.90% from two or more races. Hispanic or Latino of any race were 2.13% of the population.

There were 1,345 households, out of which 25.6% had children under the age of 18 living with them, 52.9% were married couples living together, 8.5% had a female householder with no husband present, and 34.8% were non-families. 28.6% of all households were made up of individuals, and 12.9% had someone living alone who was 65 years of age or older. The average household size was 2.27 and the average family size was 2.77.

In the CDP, the age distribution of the population shows 21.5% under the age of 18, 6.5% from 18 to 24, 23.8% from 25 to 44, 28.2% from 45 to 64, and 20.0% who were 65 years of age or older. The median age was 44 years. For every 100 females, there were 99.9 males. For every 100 females age 18 and over, there were 95.4 males.

The median income for a household in the CDP was $34,730, and the median income for a family was $43,333. Males had a median income of $32,292 versus $25,758 for females. The per capita income for the CDP was $19,108. About 11.8% of families and 16.0% of the population were below the poverty line, including 21.3% of those under age 18 and 11.4% of those age 65 or over.
