= José Manuel de Álava =

Spanish military officer

- Born: 19 January 1743; Vitoria-Gasteiz, Álava, Spain
- Died: 3 June 1795 (aged 52); Guanajuato, New Spain

José Manuel Álava y Sáenz de Navarrete (Vitoria, 19 January 1743 – Guanajuato, 3 June 1795) was a Spanish officer, colonel of the regiment posted in Puebla and brigadier of the Royal Armies, interim Spanish governor of Acapulco, explorer of the North Pacific, brother of Ignacio María de Álava and uncle of Miguel Ricardo de Álava.

== Biography ==
The son of Gaspar Álava Aranguren and Joaquina Sáenz Navarrete, he was born in Vitoria on 19 January 1743. He studied at the Vergara Aristocrats' Seminary, entered the army as a cadet and was sent into the Seville Infantry Regiment, where he was successively promoted to second lieutenant (1762), lieutenant (1767), captain and adjutant (1771) and colonel. As a captain, he took part in the thwarted blockade and Siege of Gibraltar. He was named director of La Luisiana and Punto Mochales in the New Villages of Sierra Morena, the most ambitious project of the Spanish Enlightenment.

In 1776 he sailed to North America and in Mexico he was named a grenadier captain (1777), an infantry colonel (1782), and colonel of the new fixed Regiment of Puebla de los Ángeles (1789) and brigadier (1792). He was a supernumerary (1766) and meritorious (1771) member of the Real Sociedad Bascongada de Amigos del País; and Knight of the Order of Santiago (1795). In 1790 he became the interim Spanish Governor of Acapulco.

In this role, he supported Alcalá Galiano and Cayetano Valdés in preparations for one of the seven expeditions to explore the Strait of Juan de Fuca, in the North Pacific. In 1794 he was named a councillor of the Royal Academy of San Carlos. In fulfillment of the third [Nootka Convention] between Spain and the United Kingdom signed on 11 January 1794, in which both countries agreed to leave Nootka, during September of that year he was named as representative of the Spanish crown by the viceroy, the second Count of Revillagigedo, to replace the deceased Juan Francisco de la Bodega. The official ceremony took place on 28 March 1795 with José Manuel de Álava representing Spain; and lieutenant Thomas Pearce for the United Kingdom.

Upon fulfilling his mission at Nootka, in May 1795 he requested sick leave in Guanajuato, where he died. "Recognized for his enlightened education and his diplomatic and military skills, his trajectory is a model Spanish American military career and a testimony of the interrelation between enlightened elites and the high command of the Bourbon Army"

Cape Alava, the westernmost point in the Contiguous United States, is named in his honor.

== Bibliography ==
Informe sobre la entrega de Nootka a los ingleses, s. l., 1795.

Archivo General de la Nación de México, Correspondencia de Virreyes, vols. 179 y 182.

Indiferente de guerra, vol. 150 b.

Reales Cédulas Originales, vols. 146, 151, 157, 159, 162 y 228. M. A. Valdés, Gazeta de México, martes 9 de marzo de 1790.

C. Archer, El ejército en el México borbónico 1760- 1810, México, Fondo de Cultura Económica, 1983.

J. Martínez Ruiz, Catálogo general de individuos de la R.S.B. de amigos del país (1765-1793), San Sebastián, Sociedad Guipuzcoana de Ediciones y Publicaciones, 1985.

A. Martínez Salazar, Presencia alavesa en América y Filipinas (1700- 1825), Vitoria, Diputación Foral de Álava, 1988, págs. 43- 44.

M. C. Torales Pacheco, Ilustrados en la Nueva España, México, 2001, págs. 162, 189, 198, 257, 258, 283, 317, 329 y 331.

Francisco Góngora. El Cabo Álava, en el confin de EE UU. Diario EL CORREO, 27 August 2018. pág. 8.

María Cristina Torales Pacheco. Real Academia de la Historia. Ficha biográfica.
