= Seven Lakes Basin =

Basin in Washington, United States

Coordinates: 47°54′55″N 123°46′19″W

Seven Lakes Basin is a formerly-glaciated mountain lake basin located at the headwaters of the Sol Duc River in Olympic National Park. A hiking trail to the basin is 19 miles (31 km) round trip with about 4,000 feet (1,200 m) of elevation gain. The loop trail starts by following the Sol Duc River near Sol Duc Hot Springs, traversing south past Sol Duc Falls before beginning a rapid elevation gain to eventually arrive at the High Divide separating the Hoh River valley from the Sol Duc valley, with views across the Hoh Valley to Mt. Olympus to the south.

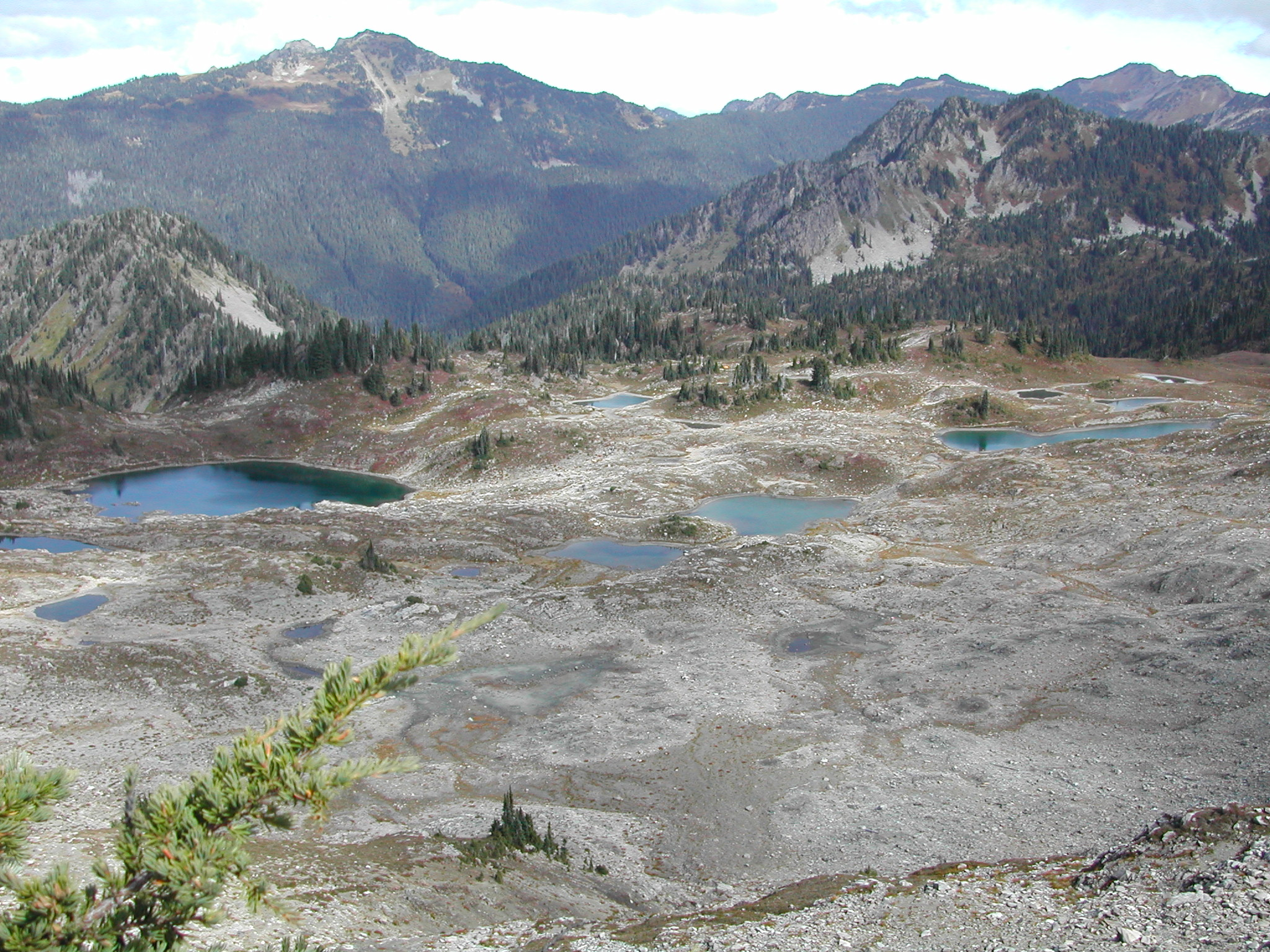
A view into Seven Lakes Basin from the High Divide

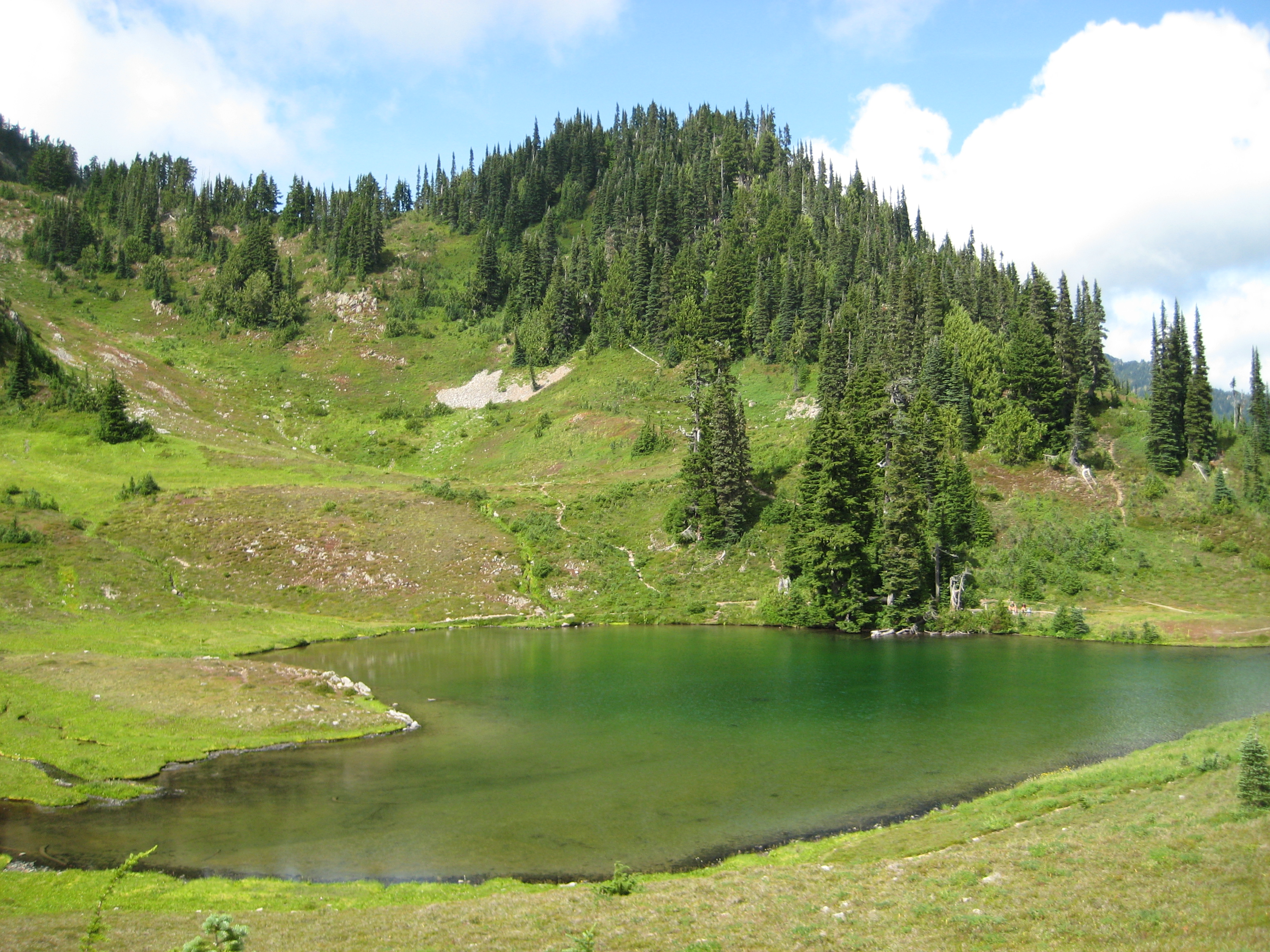
Heart lake in the seven lakes basin. Named for its distinctive shape.

While the basin itself in late summer is a barren rocky landscape, it is surrounded by high elevation old-growth forest and alpine meadows lush with wildflowers and wild blueberries. Despite the name, Seven Lakes Basin, there are actually eight small lakes and numerous tiny ponds in the area. These lakes are Sol Duc, Long, Lunch, Morgenroth, No Name, Clear, Round, and Lake No. 8. The largest lake is Sol Duc and the smallest is Morgenroth. Other subalpine lakes encountered along this loop trail below the High Divide which are not considered part of "seven lakes" include Heart Lake and Deer Lake. Heart Lake gets its name from its distinctive heart-like shape.

Black Bear, marmots, black-tailed deer and Olympic Elk are common in this area. Fishing is a popular activity in the area, although there are no fish in Heart Lake and several of the other smaller lakes in the basin.
