= Sekiu Airport =

Airport in Washington, United States

Coordinates: 48°15′58″N 124°18′50″W

- IATA: none; ICAO: none; FAA LID: 11S

Summary
- Airport type: Public
- Owner: Port of Port Angeles
- Serves: Sekiu, Washington
- Elevation AMSL: 355 ft / 108 m
- Interactive map of Sekiu Airport

Runways
Direction	Length		Surface
Direction	ft	m	Surface
8/26	2,997	913	Asphalt

Statistics (2005)
- Aircraft operations: 498
- Source: Federal Aviation Administration

Sekiu Airport (FAA LID: 11S) is a public airport serving the small community of Sekiu, in Clallam County, Washington, United States. It is owned by the Port of Port Angeles.

== Facilities and aircraft ==
Sekiu Airport covers an area of 25 acres (10 ha) which contains a 2,997 x 50 ft (913 x 15 m) lighted runway (8/26) with a visual approach indicator. Due to a 900 ft (275 m) displaced threshold, aircraft approaching from the west (runway 08) have only 2097 feet (639 m) on which to land.

For the 12-month period ending December 31, 2005, the airport had 498 aircraft operations: 95% general aviation and 5% air taxi.

== See also ==
- List of airports in Washington
