= Maple Grove, Ontario =

There are many communities in Ontario, Canada named Maple Grove:

- Maple Grove, Brant County, Ontario
- Maple Grove, Dufferin County, Ontario
- Maple Grove, Durham Regional Municipality, Ontario
- Maple Grove, Huron County, Ontario
- Maple Grove, Leeds and Grenville United Counties, Ontario
- Maple Grove, Middlesex County, Ontario
- Maple Grove, Simcoe County, Ontario
- Maple Grove, Ontario (ghost town) (displaced by the St. Lawrence seaway)
