= Maple Grove (St. Joseph, Missouri) =

Historic house in Missouri, United States

- U.S. National Register of Historic Places
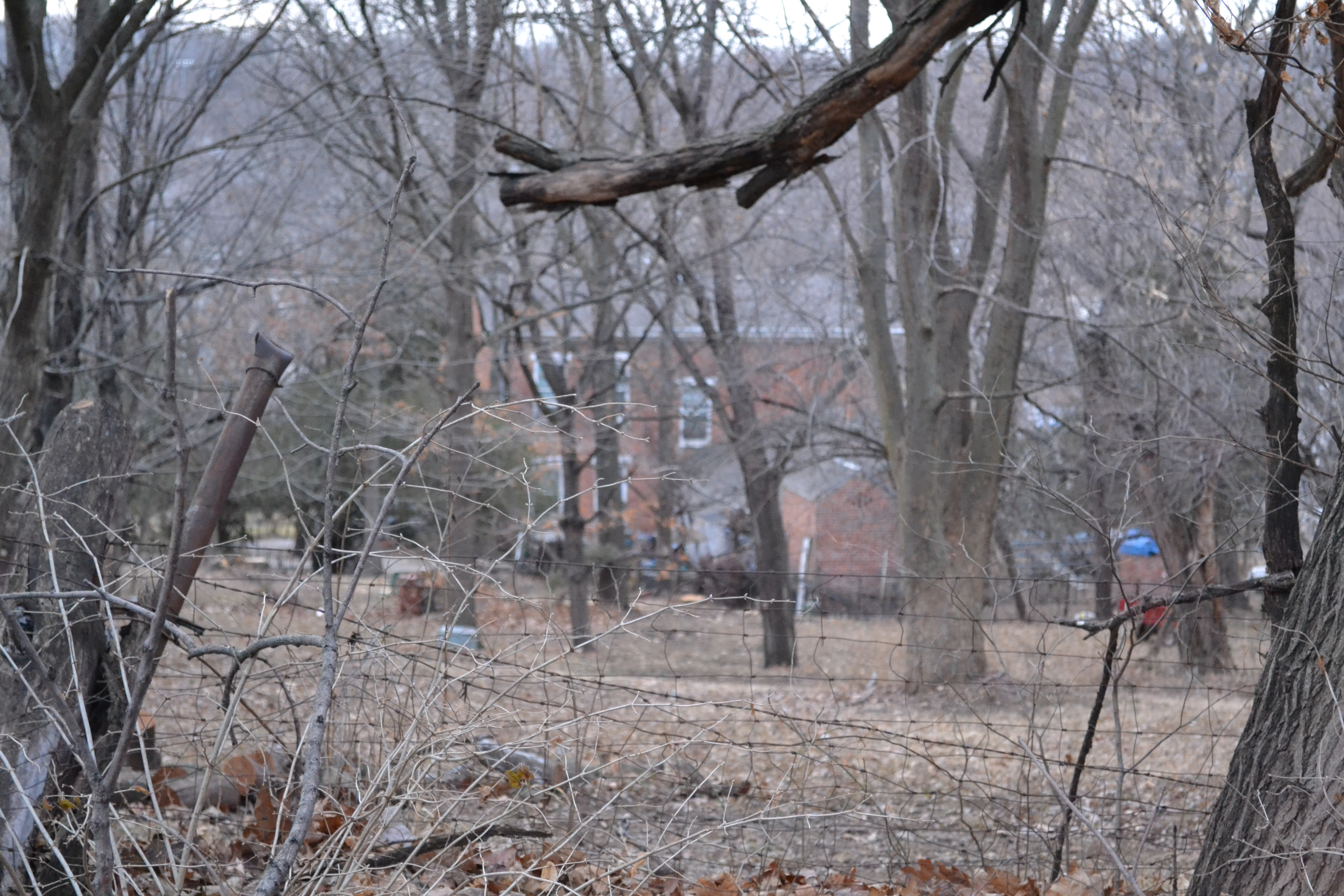
- Rear of Maple Grove from a distance

- Location within Missouri Location within the United States
- Location: 2100 N. 11th St., St. Joseph, Missouri
- Coordinates: 39°47′5″N 94°50′46″W
- Area: 4.5 acres (1.8 ha)
- Built: 1847
- Architect: Blair, William
- NRHP reference No.: 74001070
- Added to NRHP: October 16, 1974

Maple Grove, also known as the Joseph Davis House, is a historic home located at St. Joseph, Missouri. It was built in 1847, and is a two-story, five-bay, L-shaped, brick dwelling with Classical style design influences. It has a one-story wing and one-story entrance portico.

It was listed on the National Register of Historic Places in 1974.
