= Maple Grove, Washington =

Unincorporated community in Washington, United States

- Unincorporated community
- Location within Washington (state) Location within the United States
- Coordinates: 48°04′52″N 123°42′19″W
- Country: United States
- State: Washington
- County: Clallam
- Elevation: 505 ft (154 m)
- Time zone: UTC-8 (Pacific (PST))
  - Summer (DST): UTC-7 (PDT)
- ZIP code: 98363
- GNIS feature ID: 1522694

Maple Grove is an unincorporated community in Clallam County, Washington, United States.

Maple Grove is on the Lake Sutherland U.S. Geological Survey Map.
