= Maple Grove, Wisconsin =

Maple Grove is the name of some places in the U.S. state of Wisconsin:

- Maple Grove, Barron County, Wisconsin, a town
- Maple Grove, Manitowoc County, Wisconsin, a town
- Maple Grove (community), Wisconsin, in Manitowoc County, an unincorporated community
- Maple Grove, Shawano County, Wisconsin, a town
