= Maple Grove Township =

Maple Grove Township may refer to the following places in the United States:

- Maple Grove Township, Barry County, Michigan
- Maple Grove Township, Cheboygan County, Michigan (defunct)
- Maple Grove Township, Manistee County, Michigan
- Maple Grove Township, Saginaw County, Michigan
- Maple Grove Township, Becker County, Minnesota
- Maple Grove Township, Crow Wing County, Minnesota
