= Carlsborg, Washington =

- Census-designated place
- Location of Carlsborg, Washington
- Coordinates: 48°05′03″N 123°10′11″W
- Country: United States
- State: Washington
- County: Clallam

Area
  - Total: 1.0 sq mi (2.7 km^{2})
  - Land: 1.0 sq mi (2.7 km^{2})
  - Water: 0 sq mi (0.0 km^{2})
- Elevation: 207 ft (63 m)

Population (2020)
  - Total: 1,100
  - Density: 1,100/sq mi (410/km^{2})
- Time zone: UTC-8 (Pacific (PST))
  - Summer (DST): UTC-7 (PDT)
- ZIP Code: 98324
- Area code: 360, 564
- FIPS code: 53-10075
- GNIS feature ID: 2407965

Carlsborg is an unincorporated community and census-designated place (CDP) in Clallam County, Washington, United States. The population was 1,100 at the 2020 census, up from 995 at the 2010 census.

== History ==
Carlsborg was founded in 1915 by C.J. Erickson, and named after his hometown in Sweden. Its sawmill discontinued operations in 1968.

== Geography ==
Carlsborg is located in eastern Clallam County. U.S. Route 101 passes through the southern part of the community, leading east 3 miles (5 km) into Sequim and west 13 miles (21 km) to Port Angeles, the county seat.

According to the United States Census Bureau, the Carlsborg CDP has a total area of 1.0 square mile (2.7 km^{2}), all of it land.

=== Climate ===
This region experiences warm (but not hot) and dry summers, with no average monthly temperatures above 71.6 °F (22.0 °C). According to the Köppen Climate Classification system, Carlsborg has a warm-summer Mediterranean climate, abbreviated "Csb" on climate maps.

== Demographics ==
Historical population
Census	Pop.	Note	%±
2000	855		—
2010	995		16.4%
2020	1,100		10.6%
U.S. Decennial Census; 1990 2000 2010

Carlsborg first appeared as a census designated place in the 2000 U.S. census.

=== Racial and ethnic composition ===
Carlsborg CDP, Washington – Racial and ethnic composition Note: the US Census treats Hispanic/Latino as an ethnic category. This table excludes Latinos from the racial categories and assigns them to a separate category. Hispanics/Latinos may be of any race.
Race / Ethnicity (NH = Non-Hispanic)	Pop 2000	Pop 2010	Pop 2020	% 2000	% 2010	% 2020
White alone (NH)	803	896	956	93.92%	90.05%	86.91%
Black or African American alone (NH)	0	3	3	0.00%	0.30%	0.27%
Native American or Alaska Native alone (NH)	12	8	9	1.40%	0.80%	0.82%
Asian alone (NH)	7	22	19	0.82%	2.21%	1.73%
Native Hawaiian or Pacific Islander alone (NH)	0	1	0	0.00%	0.10%	0.00%
Other race alone (NH)	2	0	5	0.23%	0.00%	0.45%
Mixed race or Multiracial (NH)	17	31	63	1.99%	3.12%	5.73%
Hispanic or Latino (any race)	14	34	45	1.64%	3.42%	4.09%
Total	855	995	1,100	100.00%	100.00%	100.00%

=== 2000 census ===
As of the census of 2000, there were 855 people, 427 households, and 263 families residing in the CDP. The population density was 883.8 people per square mile (340.3/km^{2}). There were 461 housing units at an average density of 476.6/sq mi (183.5/km^{2}). The racial makeup of the CDP was 94.74% White, 1.40% Native American, 0.82% Asian, 0.70% from other races, and 2.34% from two or more races. Hispanic or Latino of any race were 1.64% of the population.

There were 427 households, out of which 13.3% had children under the age of 18 living with them, 54.1% were married couples living together, 5.2% had a female householder with no husband present, and 38.4% were non-families. 34.7% of all households were made up of individuals, and 22.2% had someone living alone who was 65 years of age or older. The average household size was 2.00 and the average family size was 2.51.

In the CDP, the age distribution of the population shows 14.7% under the age of 18, 3.3% from 18 to 24, 13.5% from 25 to 44, 20.0% from 45 to 64, and 48.5% who were 65 years of age or older. The median age was 64 years. For every 100 females, there were 92.6 males. For every 100 females age 18 and over, there were 86.4 males.

The median income for a household in the CDP was $28,103, and the median income for a family was $36,736. Males had a median income of $25,455 versus $16,618 for females. The per capita income for the CDP was $17,350. About 3.6% of families and 7.5% of the population were below the poverty line, including 7.2% of those under age 18 and none of those age 65 or over.

They are known for having three gas stations at the only traffic light on Highway 101 between Port Angeles and Sequim.
