= People's Wharf Company =

Defunct American wharf company

The People's Wharf Company owned a wharf in Port Angeles, Washington. it was part of the Puget Sound Navigation Company which held a near-monopoly on passenger and ferry transportation on Puget Sound until 1951.

== Operations ==
The People's Wharf Company operated the People's wharf in Port Angeles. In 1919 the dimensions of the wharf were 110 by 600 feet, with 560 feet on the deep water landing face. The depth of water at low tide at the wharf was 12 to 26 feet. The wharf was used by the Puget Sound Navigation Company. In 1919 the company's agent in Port Angeles was L. M. Johnson, and the company's steamers calling on the wharf in that year were the Sol Duc, Utopia, and Waialeale.

By 1929 the People's Wharf Company was owned by the Puget Sound Navigation Company. According to 1929 records, People's Wharf Company was capitalized at $25,420.10.
