= Ozette Indian Village Archeological Site =

- Ozette Native American Village Archaeological Site
- U.S. National Register of Historic Places
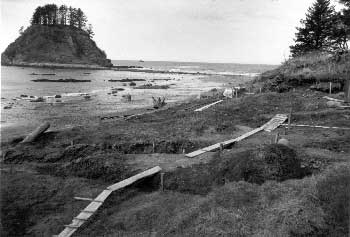

- Location within Washington (state)
- Location: Address restricted
- Nearest city: Neah Bay, Washington
- NRHP reference No.: 74000916
- Added to NRHP: January 11, 1974

The Ozette Native American Village Archeological Site is the site of an archaeological excavation on the Olympic Peninsula near Neah Bay, Washington, United States. The site was a village occupied by the Ozette Makah people until a mudslide inundated the site around the year 1750. It is located in the now unpopulated Ozette Indian Reservation.

The 22-mile-long Hoko-Ozette Road, accessed via Washington State Route 112, terminates at the NPS Lake Ozette Ranger Station, within the coastal strip of Olympic National Park. The Lake Ozette Ranger Station, positioned at the north end of Lake Ozette, is approximately 3 miles from the archaeological site. The land between the Pacific coast and the Ozette River was settled by a small community of Scandinavian immigrants at the end of the 19th century; these being amongst the first Europeans to establish a permanent presence on the extreme western fringe of the Olympic Peninsula.

The area is popular with backpackers and day-hikers, many of whom undertake to complete the 9.5 mile long Ozette Loop trail; commencing/terminating at Lake Ozette Ranger Station and taking in the coastal locations of Sand Point and Cape Alava.

In 1997, a delegation from Mihama came to Ozette to commemorate the souls of three Japanese sailors whose ship ran aground in the area in 1834, and who were held briefly by the Makah before being released to Fort Vancouver.

== History ==
Around 1560 (according to radiocarbon dating), a mudslide engulfed part of the Makah village of ʔuse·ʔił along the coast of modern-day Washington near Lake Ozette. Archaeological test pits were excavated at the Ozette site in 1966 and 1967 by Richard Daugherty. However, it was not until 1970 that it became apparent what was buried there. After a storm in February 1970, tidal erosion exposed hundreds of well-preserved wooden artifacts. The excavation of the Ozette site began shortly after. University students worked with the Makah under the direction of archaeologists using pressurized water to remove mud from six buried long houses. The excavation went on for 11 years and produced over 55,000 artifacts, many of which are on display in the Makah Museum at the Makah Cultural and Research Center.

The mudslide preserved several houses and their contents in a collapsed state until the 1970s when they were excavated by Makahs and archaeologists from Washington State University. More than 55,000 artifacts were recovered, spanning a period of occupation around 2,000 years, representing many activities of the Makahs, from whale and seal hunting to salmon and halibut fishing; from toys and games to bows and arrows. Of the artifacts recovered, roughly 30,000 were made of wood, extraordinary in that wood generally decays particularly fast. Hundreds of knives were recovered, with blade materials ranging from mussel shell, to sharpened beaver teeth, and iron, presumed to have drifted from Asia on wrecked ships. The oral history of the Makah mentions a "great slide" which engulfed a portion of Ozette long ago.

The Makah Museum opened in 1979 and displays replicas of cedar long houses as well as whaling, fishing, and sealing canoes.

Ozette was occupied prior to frequent European visitation. It was therefore in existence before smallpox and other foreign diseases decimated the population. Since the mudslide buried the village and houses so rapidly, Ozette provides good preservation of what a society looked like as it was before abandonment or after looting.

== See also ==
- Manis Mastodon site
- Marmes Rockshelter
