= Cape Alava =

Cape in Clallam County, Washington, U.S.

Coordinates: 48°10′N 124°44′W

Cape Alava (/ˈæləvə/) is a cape in the Pacific Northwest region of the United States. Located in Clallam County, Washington, the cape is situated within Olympic National Park and the Makah Indian Reservation, and is accessible via a 3-mile (5 km) boardwalk hike from a ranger station in the park.

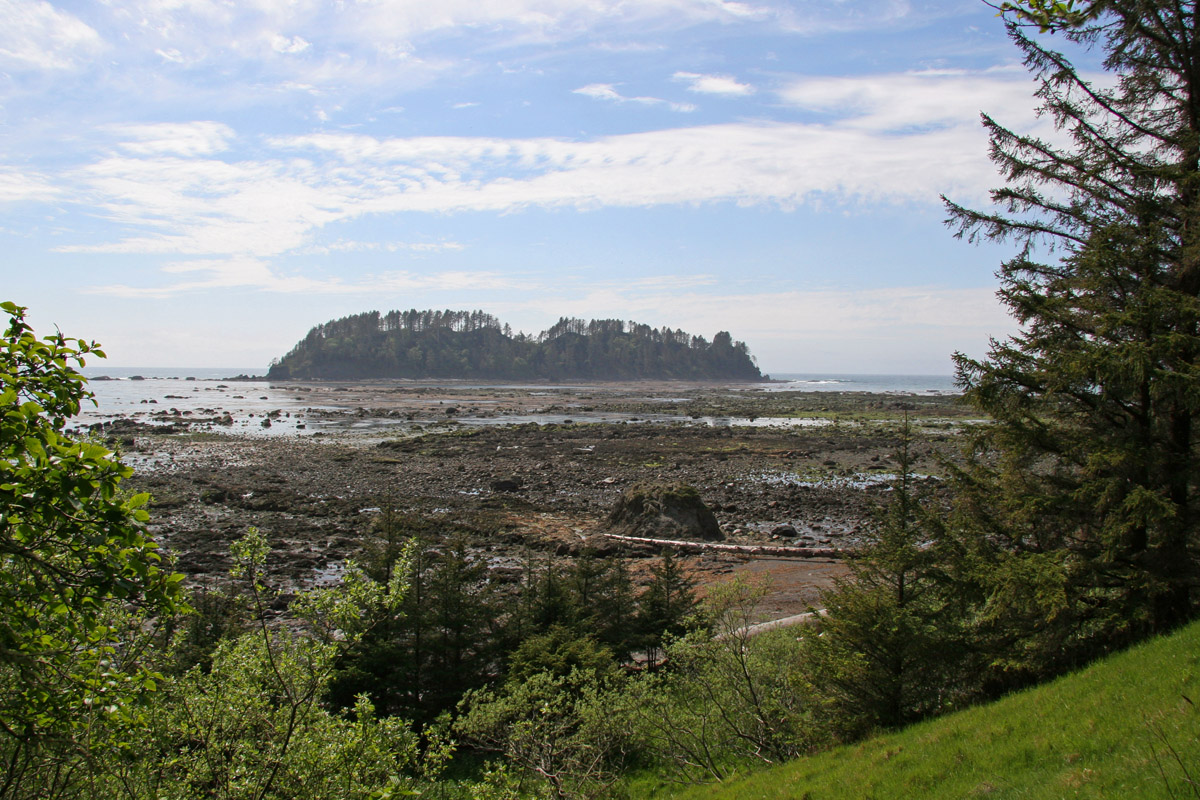
Cape Alava and Ozette Island

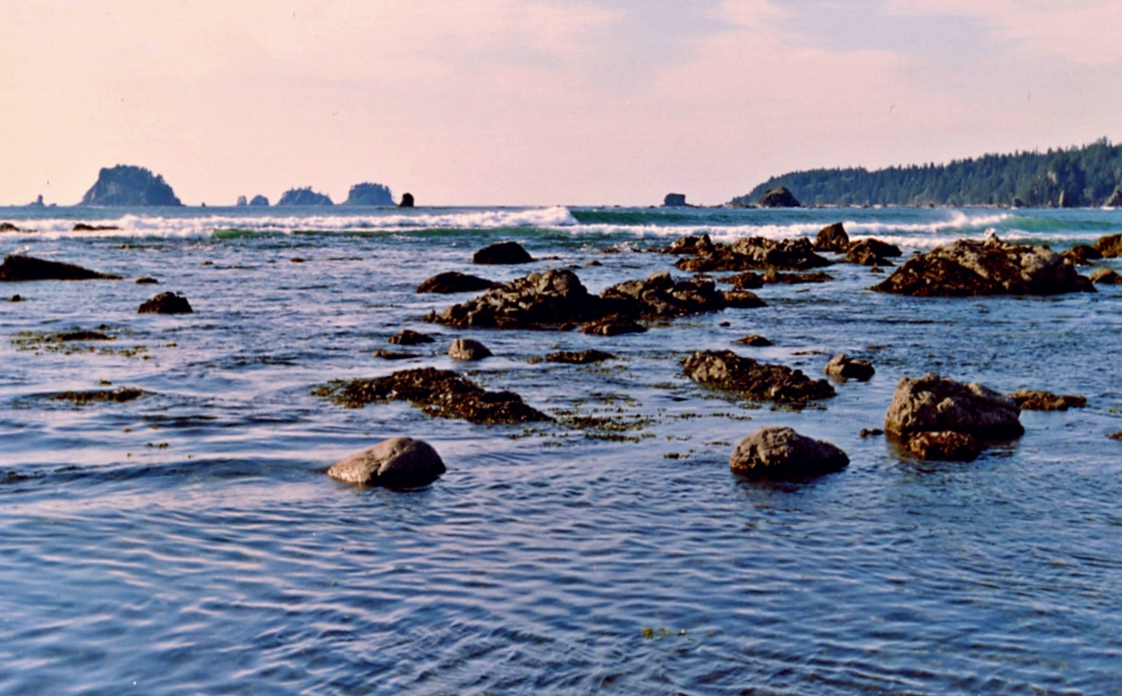
Looking north at Cape Alava and Ozette Island, Olympic National Park.

Cape Alava Trail was designated a National Recreation Trail in 1981.

== Name ==
The cape was named after the Basque Don José Manuel de Álava (born in Vitoria, Álava, January 1, 1743) for his role as commissioner during the solution of the conflict of Nootka in 1794.

== Westernmost location ==
Cape Alava is the westernmost point in the contiguous United States, with a longitude of 124° 44′ 11.8″ W (during low tide and walking out to the west side of Tskawahyah Island).

Nearby Cape Flattery and Cape Blanco in southern Oregon are also very close longitudinally to being the westernmost points in the contiguous 48 states, which are at 124° 43′ 54.7″ W and 124° 34′ 00.1″ W respectively.

== History ==
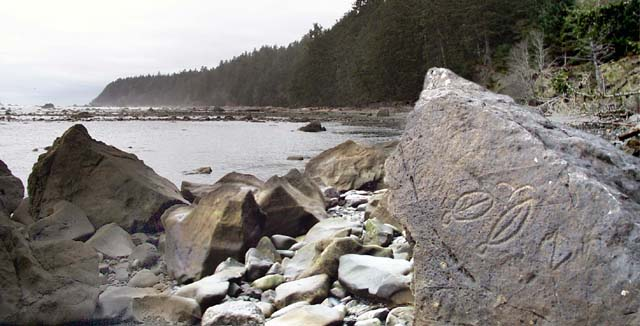
Petroglyphs at Wedding Rocks, approximately 1 kilometre (0.62 mi) south of Cape Alava, Olympic NP

In early 1834, a mastless and rudderless Japanese rice transport ship, the Hojun Maru, made landfall at Cape Alava after drifting for 14-months on the Pacific Ocean. It was supposed to bring rice to Edo, but was broken and blown off course by a large storm. At the time of arrival near Cape Alava, only three of its crew were alive (the youngest being Otokichi). They were then looked after and briefly enslaved by the indigenous Makah people before being taken to Fort Vancouver.

The Cape became the western terminus of the newly created Pacific Northwest Trail with the passage of the Omnibus Public Land Management Act of 2009.

== Geology ==
The beaches surrounding the trail terminus are composed of a variety of different rock types and formations.

The rich mixture is a result of the combined erosive power of the ocean and relatively recent glacial activity. According to the Washington State Department of Natural Resources, the area's sediments are classified as Unconsolidated Deposition, translating to the geological equivalent of a grab bag. More finely, the deposits are listed as "Quaternary Sediments, Dominantly Glacial Drift, includes alluvium". The Quaternary time period dates to the end of the most recent ice age, roughly 10,000 to 14,000 BCE. A shows the unique nature of such sediments being exposed to the full grinding force of the Pacific Ocean. There are many such areas scattered about the Puget Sound, yet very few areas on the unprotected Washington coast.

== Recreation ==
Cape Alava is the western terminus of the Pacific Northwest National Scenic Trail.

== See also ==
- Extreme points of the United States
