= Sekiu, Washington =

- Census-designated place
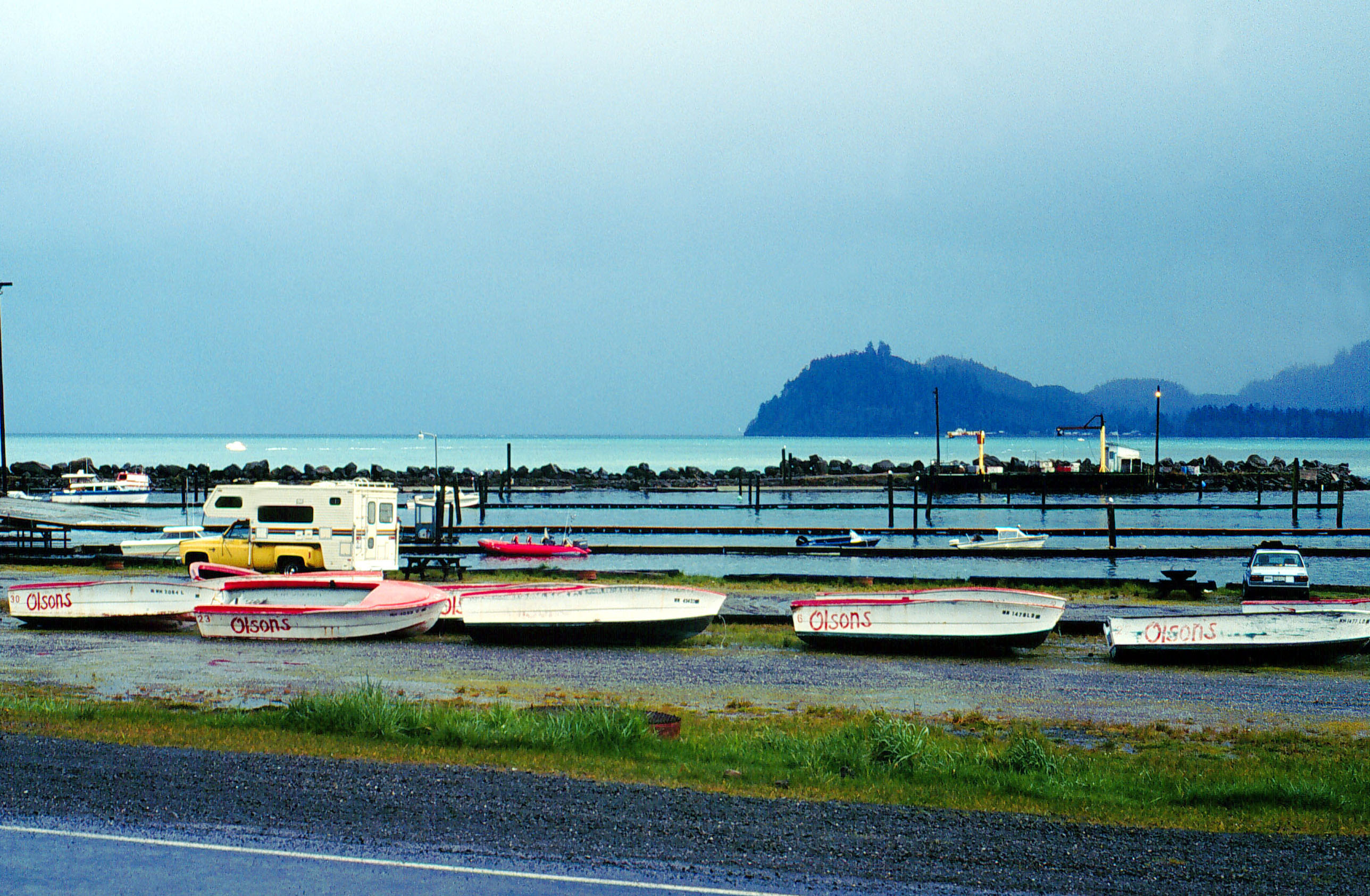
- Fishing boats out for the winter in Sekiu

- Location in Washington and Washington state's location inside of the U.S.
- Coordinates: 48°15′51″N 124°18′05″W
- Country: United States
- State: Washington
- County: Clallam
- Settled: 1879
- Elevation: 20 ft (6.1 m)

Population (2010)
  - Total: 27
  - Density: 211/sq mi (81.5/km^{2})
- Time zone: UTC-8 (PST)
  - Summer (DST): UTC-7 (PDT)
- ZIP Code: 98381
- Area code(s): 360, 564
- GNIS feature ID: 2586747

Sekiu, a small fishing village, is an unincorporated community and census-designated place in Clallam County, Washington, United States. As of the 2020 census it had a population of 24. Overlooking the west side of Clallam Bay and the Strait of Juan de Fuca, it is twinned with the community of Clallam Bay, on the east side of the bay.

The term "Sekiu" first appears as Sekou Pt on Henry Kellett's chart of 1846. Sekiu was first settled in 1879 by J.A. Martin who attempted to establish a salmon cannery there; leather tanning and logging were other early industries in the area.

Sekiu has a small year-round population and is known primarily as a summer tourist destination for kayaking, birdwatching, diving, and fishing, particularly for salmon, halibut, lingcod, rockfish, and other bottomfish. Additionally, whale watching can occur from the Sekiu overlook.

Sekiu Airport is located 1 mile (1.6 km) west of Sekiu and offers a 2,997-foot (913 m) lighted runway with a visual approach indicator, at an elevation of 350 feet (110 m).

== Climate ==
The climate in this area has mild differences between highs and lows. Average year-round temperatures fall between 41 °F (5 °C) in winter to 58 °F (14 °C) in summer, with an average rainfall of 95 inches (240 cm). According to the Köppen Climate Classification system, Sekiu has a marine west coast climate, abbreviated "Cfb" on climate maps.

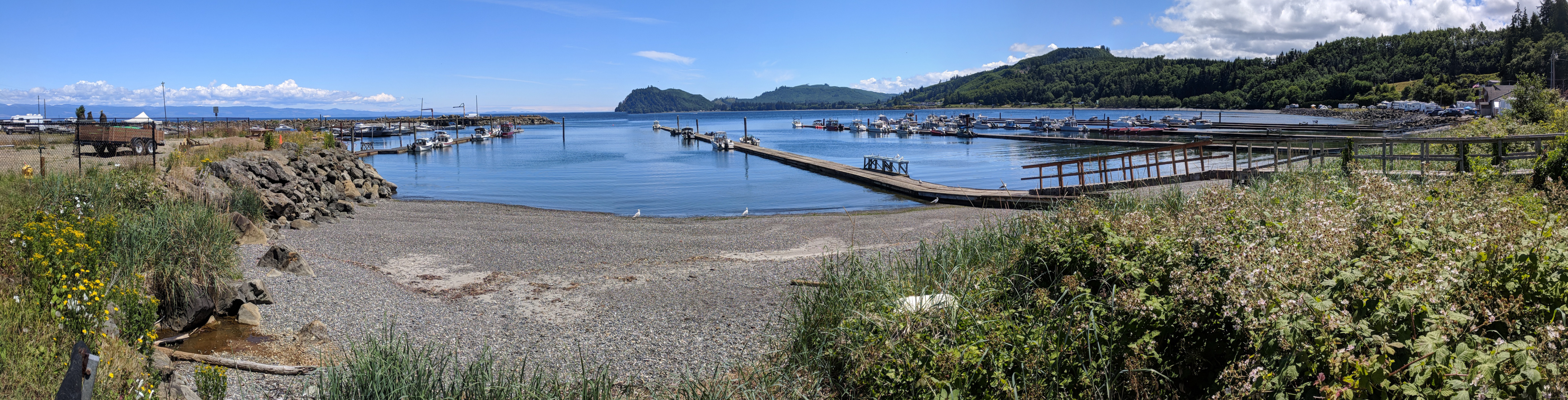
The small boat harbor at Sekiu, with Vancouver Island visible in the distance

Climate data for Sekiu, Washington (1991-2020)
| Month | Jan | Feb | Mar | Apr | May | Jun | Jul | Aug | Sep | Oct | Nov | Dec | Year |
|---|---|---|---|---|---|---|---|---|---|---|---|---|---|
| Mean daily maximum °F (°C) | 46.0 (7.8) | 47.5 (8.6) | 49.8 (9.9) | 52.7 (11.5) | 57.6 (14.2) | 61.2 (16.2) | 64.9 (18.3) | 65.7 (18.7) | 63.7 (17.6) | 56.5 (13.6) | 50.2 (10.1) | 45.5 (7.5) | 55.1 (12.8) |
| Daily mean °F (°C) | 41.4 (5.2) | 42.1 (5.6) | 43.7 (6.5) | 46.4 (8.0) | 51.1 (10.6) | 54.7 (12.6) | 58.1 (14.5) | 58.5 (14.7) | 56.3 (13.5) | 50.4 (10.2) | 44.8 (7.1) | 41.0 (5.0) | 49.0 (9.5) |
| Mean daily minimum °F (°C) | 36.7 (2.6) | 36.5 (2.5) | 37.6 (3.1) | 40.1 (4.5) | 44.6 (7.0) | 48.4 (9.1) | 51.1 (10.6) | 51.4 (10.8) | 48.9 (9.4) | 44.1 (6.7) | 39.4 (4.1) | 36.3 (2.4) | 42.9 (6.1) |
| Average precipitation inches (mm) | 14.64 (371.83) | 8.91 (226.24) | 9.42 (239.17) | 5.69 (144.6) | 3.09 (78.55) | 1.95 (49.61) | 1.14 (29.07) | 1.34 (33.92) | 2.76 (70.03) | 7.95 (201.96) | 13.55 (344.09) | 12.98 (329.68) | 83.42 (2,118.75) |
| Average dew point °F (°C) | 37.2 (2.9) | 36.1 (2.3) | 37.9 (3.3) | 40.5 (4.7) | 45.0 (7.2) | 48.9 (9.4) | 52.3 (11.3) | 53.1 (11.7) | 50.5 (10.3) | 45.7 (7.6) | 40.5 (4.7) | 36.7 (2.6) | 43.7 (6.5) |
Source: PRISM Climate Group

== Demographics ==
Historical population
| Census | Pop. | Note | %± |
|---|---|---|---|
| 2010 | 24 | | — |
| 2020 | 27 | | 12.5% |
U.S. Decennial Census; 2000 2010

Sekiu first appeared as a census designated place in the 2010 U.S. census.

=== Racial and ethnic composition ===
Sekiu CDP, Washington – Racial and ethnic composition Note: the US Census treats Hispanic/Latino as an ethnic category. This table excludes Latinos from the racial categories and assigns them to a separate category. Hispanics/Latinos may be of any race.
| Race / Ethnicity (NH = Non-Hispanic) | Pop 2010 | Pop 2020 | % 2010 | % 2020 |
|---|---|---|---|---|
| White alone (NH) | 26 | 19 | 96.30% | 79.17% |
| Black or African American alone (NH) | 0 | 0 | 0.00% | 0.00% |
| Native American or Alaska Native alone (NH) | 0 | 0 | 0.00% | 0.00% |
| Asian alone (NH) | 0 | 0 | 0.00% | 0.00% |
| Native Hawaiian or Pacific Islander alone (NH) | 0 | 0 | 0.00% | 0.00% |
| Other race alone (NH) | 0 | 1 | 0.00% | 4.17% |
| Mixed race or Multiracial (NH) | 0 | 1 | 0.00% | 4.17% |
| Hispanic or Latino (any race) | 1 | 3 | 3.70% | 12.50% |
| Total | 27 | 24 | 100.00% | 100.00% |
