= Maple Grove Township, Crow Wing County, Minnesota =

Township in Minnesota, United States

Maple Grove Township
- Township
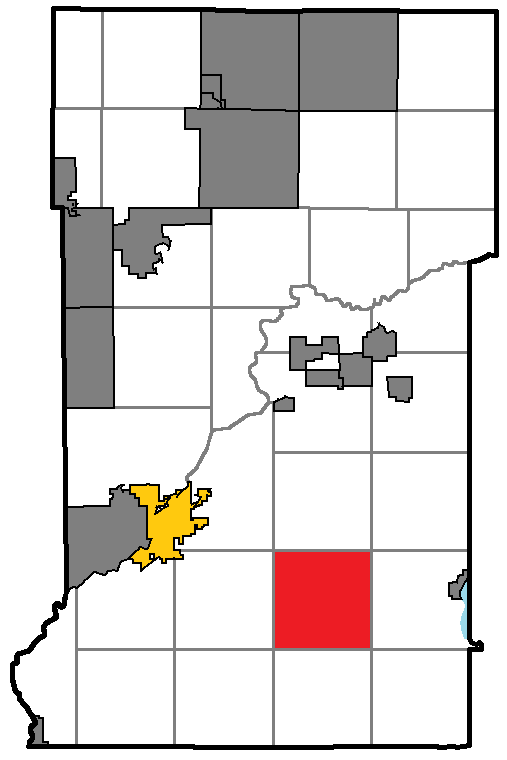
- Location of Maple Grove Township, within Crow Wing County, Minnesota
- Coordinates: 46°17′30″N 94°1′5″W
- Country: United States
- State: Minnesota
- County: Crow Wing

Area
  - Total: 35.9 sq mi (93.1 km^{2})
  - Land: 34.3 sq mi (88.9 km^{2})
  - Water: 1.6 sq mi (4.2 km^{2})
- Elevation: 1,280 ft (390 m)

Population (2020)
  - Total: 713
  - Density: 20.8/sq mi (8.02/km^{2})
- Time zone: UTC-6 (Central (CST))
  - Summer (DST): UTC-5 (CDT)
- FIPS code: 27-40148
- GNIS feature ID: 0664900

Maple Grove Township is a township in Crow Wing County, Minnesota, United States. The population was 713 at the 2020 census.

Maple Grove Township was named for the abundance of sugar maple trees in the area.

== Geography ==
According to the United States Census Bureau, the township has a total area of 36.0 square miles (93.1 km^{2}), of which 34.3 square miles (88.9 km^{2}) is land and 1.6 square miles (4.2 km^{2}) (4.53%) is water.

== Demographics ==
As of the census of 2000, there were 665 people, 239 households, and 184 families residing in the township. The population density was 19.4 inhabitants per square mile (7.5/km^{2}). There were 281 housing units at an average density of 8.2 per square mile (3.2/km^{2}). The racial makeup of the township was 98.35% White, 0.60% Native American, 0.30% Asian, and 0.75% from two or more races. Hispanic or Latino of any race were 0.15% of the population.

There were 239 households, out of which 36.8% had children under the age of 18 living with them, 70.7% were married couples living together, 2.1% had a female householder with no husband present, and 22.6% were non-families. 19.2% of all households were made up of individuals, and 7.5% had someone living alone who was 65 years of age or older. The average household size was 2.78 and the average family size was 3.21.

In the township the population was spread out, with 29.2% under the age of 18, 4.8% from 18 to 24, 29.2% from 25 to 44, 25.6% from 45 to 64, and 11.3% who were 65 years of age or older. The median age was 38 years. For every 100 females, there were 98.5 males. For every 100 females age 18 and over, there were 99.6 males.

The median income for a household in the township was $50,833, and the median income for a family was $56,429. Males had a median income of $37,167 versus $27,375 for females. The per capita income for the township was $20,552. About 3.8% of families and 5.4% of the population were below the poverty line, including 4.9% of those under age 18 and 5.8% of those age 65 or over.
