= Ozette Lake =

Lake in Clallam County, Washington, USA

Lake Ozette
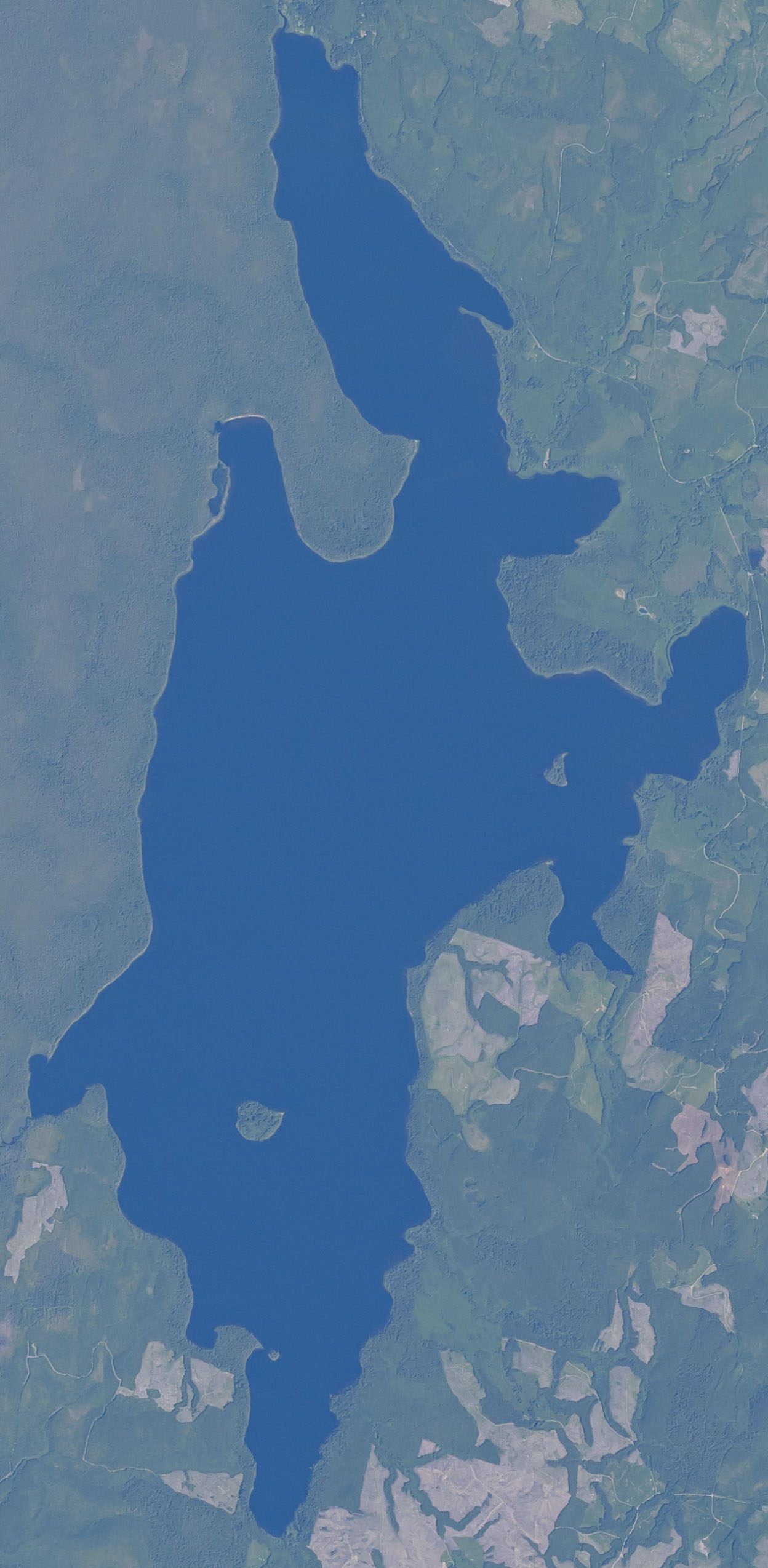
- View from ISS Expedition 71, June 2024

- Location within Washington (state) Location within the United States
- Location: Clallam County, Washington, United States
- Coordinates: 48°5′40.21″N 124°37′56.95″W
- Primary outflows: Ozette River
- Basin countries: United States
- Surface area: 7,787 acres (3,151 ha)
- Max. depth: 331 ft (101 m)
- Surface elevation: 29 ft (8.8 m)
- Islands: 3 (Tivoli, Garden Island, Baby Island)

Lake Ozette is the largest unaltered natural lake in Washington state at 29.5 km^{2} (11.4 sq mi).

The Makah name for Lake Ozette was q̓aʔuk meaning "large lake". 8 mi (13 km) long and 3 mi (4.8 km) wide, Lake Ozette is contained within the northern boundary of the Olympic National Park's coastal strip. It is 29 ft (8.8 m) above sea level and is drained by the Ozette River in the north end. Ozette, Washington, lies at the north end of the lake. At 331 feet (101 metres) deep, its bottom lies more than 300 feet (91 metres) below sea level.

There are three islands on Lake Ozette: Tivoli, Garden Island, and Baby Island. Tivoli's sandy shore is a kayaking and canoeing destination for overnight tent campers willing to make the long trip down the lake. The Erickson's Bay campground is the only boat in campground in Olympic National Park.

Lake Ozette features several trails leading to the Pacific Coast Marine Sanctuary. Three of these trails are continuous cedar boardwalks maintained by the Olympic National Park Service. The two most traveled trails depart from the Olympic National Park information kiosks and restrooms at the north end of Lake Ozette. The northern trail is a cedar boardwalk leading to Cape Alava, passing through Ahlstrom's Prairie; the southern boardwalk trail leads to Sand Point and the Ozette Indian Petroglyphs at Wedding Rock. There are 54 petroglyphs found there. There is a shorter (2.5 mi (4.0 km)) boat-in only, well-maintained trail that heads out to the wild ocean beaches from Erickson's Bay on the northwestern side of Lake Ozette. Longer coastal hiking trails include the Ozette Loop, connecting the Sand Point and Cape Alava trails by hiking up or down the beach to the next trailhead. (About 9 mi (14 km).)

Two other trails include one heading to the beach just south of the Park-maintained trail from Erickson's Bay (Coast Guard Trail) and a trail from Allen's Bay out to Kayostla Beach. Both trails are undeveloped and known to be frequently muddy.

The National Park Service maintains 15 sites at the main campground at the north end of the lake.
