= MV Diamond Knot =

Cargo ship of the United States

Coordinates: 48.171694°N 123.717306°W

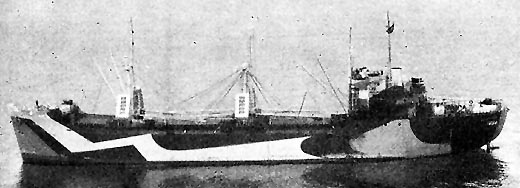
- C1-M-AV1 type ship

History

United States
- Name: MV Diamond Knot
- Owner: War Shipping Administration
- Operator: United States Lines 1944 to 1947; Alaska Steamship Co. 1947
- Ordered: as type (C1-M-AV1) hull, MC
- Builder: Consolidated Steel Corporation
- Commissioned: December 23, 1944
- Fate: Sank August 12, 1947 after collision in the Strait of Juan de Fuca in fog.

General characteristics
- Class & type: Alamosa-class cargo ship
- Type: C1-M-AV1
- Tonnage: 5,032 long tons deadweight (DWT)
- Displacement: 2,382 long tons (2,420 t) (standard); 7,450 long tons (7,570 t) (full load)
- Length: 388 ft 8 in (118.47 m)
- Beam: 50 ft (15 m)
- Draft: 21 ft 1 in (6.43 m)
- Installed power: 1 × Nordberg, TSM 6 diesel engine; 1,750 shp (1,300 kW)
- Propulsion: 1 × propeller
- Speed: 11.5 kn (21.3 km/h; 13.2 mph)
- Capacity: 3,945 t (3,883 long tons) DWT; 9,830 cu ft (278 m^{3}) (refrigerated); 227,730 cu ft (6,449 m^{3}) (non-refrigerated)
- Complement: 10 Officers; 69 Enlisted
- Armament: 1 × 3 in (76 mm)/50 caliber dual-purpose gun (DP); 6 × 20 mm (0.8 in) Oerlikon anti-aircraft (AA) cannons

The MV Diamond Knot was a C1-M-AV1 ship owned by the War Shipping Administration. She was operated by United States Lines from 1944 to 1947 under a bareboat under charter with the Maritime Commission and War Shipping Administration for World War II.

In 1947 she was operated by the Alaska Steamship Co. She sank in the Strait of Juan de Fuca on the night of August 12, 1947, after a collision with the SS Fenn Victory, a Victory class ship. The Fenn Victory was repaired and returned to service. At 1:15 AM, in fog, the bow of the Fenn Victory cut into the starboard side of the Diamond Knot. The cut was over 14 feet deep in to the Diamond Knot. The Fenn Victory had departed Seattle, she was partly loaded. The two ships were locked for a time, after getting free the Diamond Knot trying to get to shore sank at 8:57 AM, in 135 feet of water just off of Tongue Point, Washington. The sinking resulted in the largest collision cargo loss in the waters of the Pacific Coast to that time. The ship was carrying a seven million cans of salmon, most of which was subsequently recovered, repackaged, and sold.

The wreck remains on the seafloor where it originally sank, at a depth of 70 to 130 ft, and is a popular spot for recreational SCUBA divers west of Salt Creek Recreation Area.

== See also ==
- Type C1 ship
- USNS Private John F. Thorson a C1-M-AV1
- USNS Rose Knot
