= Freshwater Bay (Washington) =

Bay in Washington, United States

Coordinates: 48°08′31″N 123°35′43″W

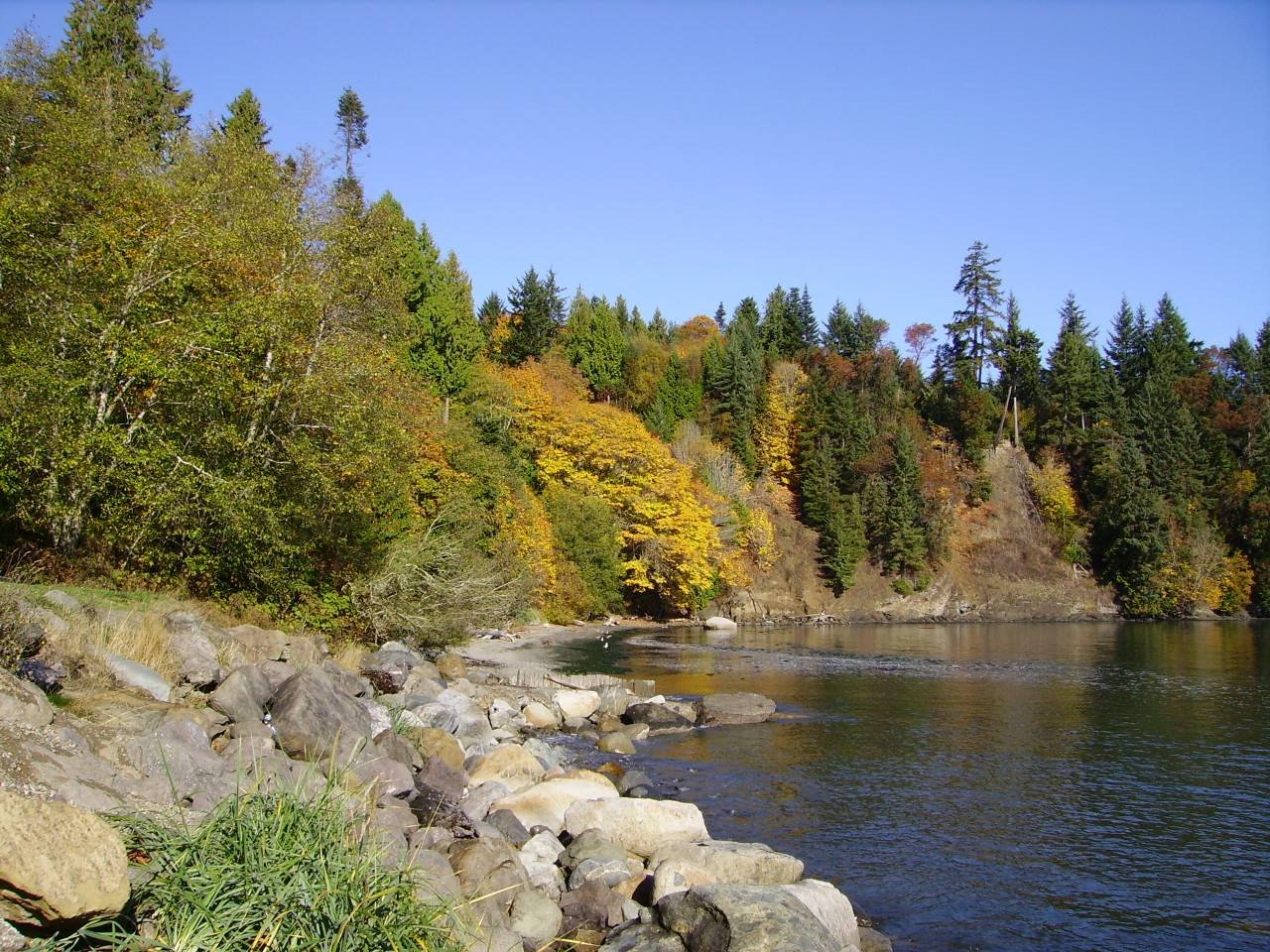

Freshwater Bay is a bay upon the Strait of Juan de Fuca on the northern coast of the Olympic Peninsula, 10 miles (16 km) west of Port Angeles off State Route 112 and 3 miles (4.8 km) north on Freshwater Bay Road. It is just east of Striped Peak. The bay has water access via a small boat ramp, although launching is only recommended for small boats and kayaks. Launching and retrieving of boats can be especially difficult at low tide, as the bay is very shallow, leaving the small paved ramp completely exposed. The launch ramp has no dock.

The park also includes 1,450 lineal feet of public tidelands. It is a starting point for many boaters and kayakers. Also, located there is a 5-acre (20,000 m^{2}) park open during the summer months.

A small public beach is accessible surrounding the boat ramp, and at low tide extends significantly northward into the bay. One can also go clamming and observe a number of species of wildlife, including, sea stars, sea anemones, kelp, and sea gulls. Bachelor Rock, a sea stack, is also visible from the bay.

== History ==
The Spanish Explorer Manuel Quimper named the bay Ensenada de Davila in 1790. It received its present name in 1846 from Henry Kellett.
