= Clallam River =

- Location of the mouth of the Clallam River in Washington Clallam River (the United States)

Location
- Country: United States
- State: Washington
- County: Clallam

Physical characteristics
- Source: Olympic Mountains
  - coordinates: 48°10′16″N 124°17′41″W
- Mouth: Strait of Juan de Fuca
  - location: Clallam Bay
  - coordinates: 48°15′19″N 124°15′49″W
- Length: 15.7 mi (25.3 km)
- Basin size: 31.1 sq mi (81 km^{2})

The Clallam River is a river in the U.S. state of Washington. The river is over 15.7 miles (25.3 km) long. Nearby and similar rivers include the Pysht River and Hoko River.

== Course ==
The Clallam River originates in the Olympic Mountains near Ellis Mountain. It flows generally north collecting tributaries such as Blowder Creek, Charley Creek, Last Creek, and Pearson Creek before emptying into Clallam Bay, part of the Strait of Juan de Fuca. The community of Clallam Bay is located at the river's mouth.

== Natural history ==
The Clallam River supports populations of coho, chum, and Chinook salmon as well as steelhead and coastal cutthroat trout.

The Clallam River is unusual in that sands and gravels frequently block the river's mouth. The river's lower course runs parallel to the sea, behind the gravel bars. Over the years the river repeatedly breaks through the barrier in different places, usually during periods of high stream flow. Sometimes migrating fish are trapped behind gravel barriers at the river's mouth. In July 1998 significant numbers of Steelhead trout were trapped in this way. The Pacific Coast Salmon Coalition had a channel cleared through the gravel bar, allowing the fish to escape.

== See also ==
- List of rivers of Washington (state)
