= Salt Creek (Washington) =

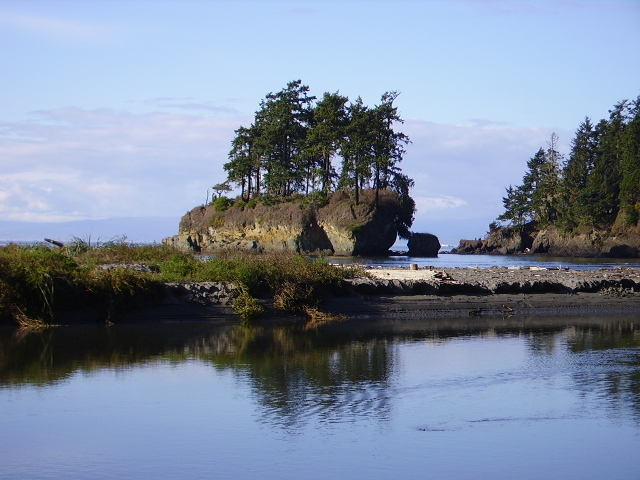
- A sea stack in the Salt Creek estuary

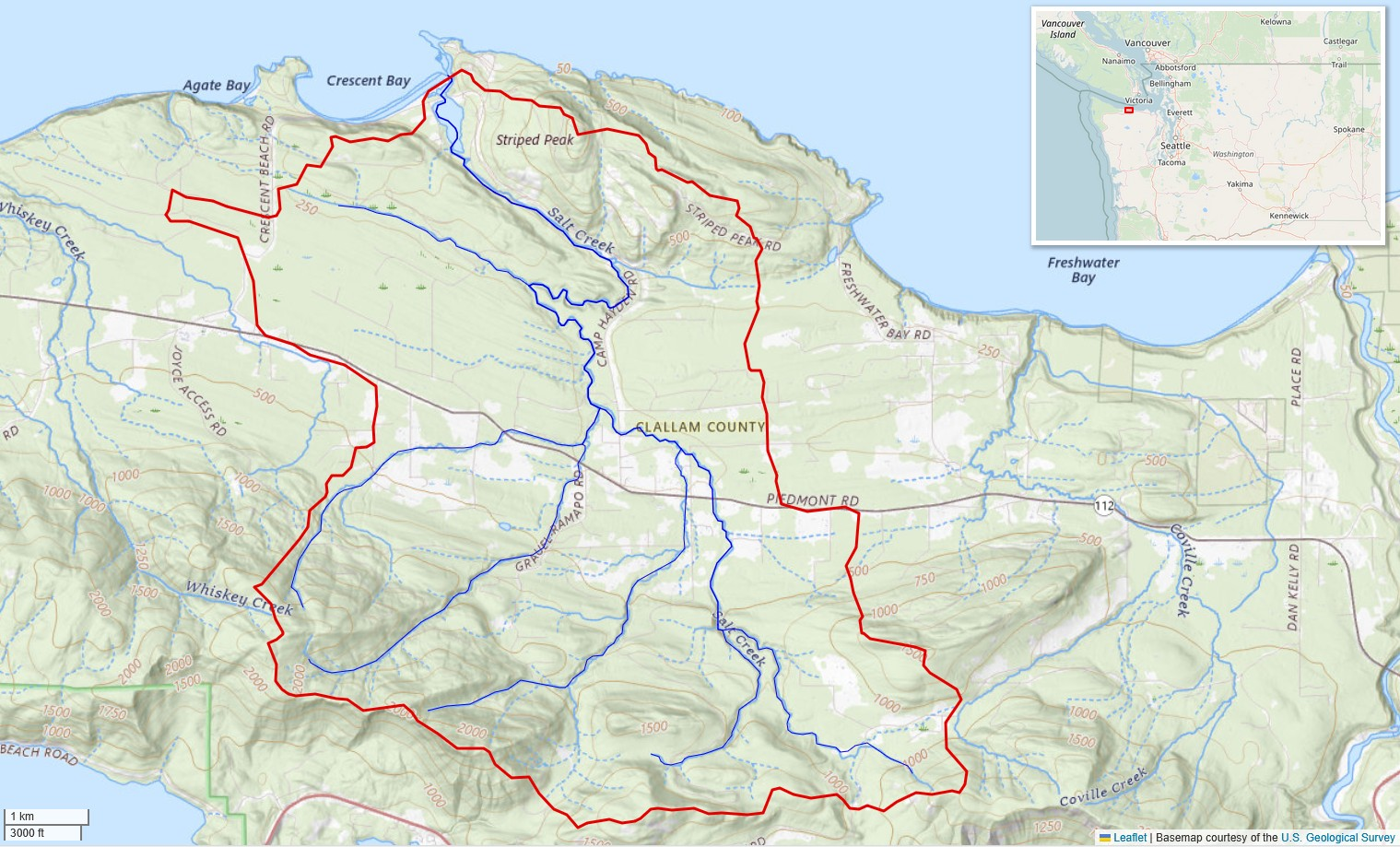
- Salt Creek watershed (Interactive map)

Location
- Country: United States
- State: Washington
- County: Clallam

Physical characteristics
- Source: Olympic Mountains foothills
  - location: 48°5′32″N 123°40′23″W
- Mouth: Strait of Juan de Fuca
  - location: Crescent Bay
  - coordinates: 48°9′48″N 123°42′21″W
- Length: 9.3 mi (15.0 km)
- Basin size: 19 sq mi (49 km^{2})

Salt Creek is a 9.3-mile-long (15.0 km) stream in Clallam County, Washington, United States. It flows from the foothills of the Olympic Mountains, past Striped Peak, and into a large tidal wetland before it meets the Strait of Juan de Fuca west of Port Angeles. It is within the traditional territory of the Klallam people, and was the site of a major village during the precolonial era. The creek is a spawning site for coho salmon and steelhead trout, although man-made barriers have disrupted the passage of fish in much of the watershed.

== Course ==
Salt Creek is approximately 9.3 miles (15.0 km) long. Its headwaters are in the low foothills of the Olympic Mountains of western Washington, northeast of Lake Sutherland. A short distance from its headwaters, it flows through a broad terrace, taking in several tributary streams. The watershed includes four main tributaries: the upper mainstem of Salt Creek, Nordstrom Creek (the second largest creek in the watershed), Bear Creek, and Fall Creek. After taking these in, Salt Creek then flows northwest through a valley adjacent to Striped Peak. It meanders through this valley until it reaches a large tidal wetland on an alluvial fan. It runs through this wetland for another 0.65 miles (1.05 km) before reaching its mouth at Crescent Bay, on the Strait of Juan de Fuca, about 9 miles (14 km) west of the city of Port Angeles, Washington.

== Description ==
The river channel of Salt Creek averages 12 ft (3.7 m) in width. Its substrate (bottom) mainly consists of gravel. The creek and several of its tributaries serve as spawning areas for coho salmon and steelhead trout.

The Salt Creek watershed is about 19.1 square miles (49 km^{2}) in area. The lower portions of the watershed mainly consists of wetlands and salt marsh, while the upper portions are almost entirely covered in forest, with pockets of wetland. The basin supports breeding populations of bald eagles and band-tailed pigeons. Western hemlock and Douglas fir trees are common throughout the watershed, with Douglas firs more common in the younger forests. Land ownership in the basin is mixed between state and commercial timberland in the uplands, with agricultural lands and rural residential areas in the flatter portions of the lower and middle watershed. The mouth of the creek is at the western end of Salt Creek Recreation Area, a county park and campsite.

Portions of the watershed receive between 35 and 55 inches (890 and 1,400 mm) of precipitation per year, with the greatest amount from October to March. The discharge of the creek reaches an annual maximum of around 2,000 cubic feet (57 m^{3}) per second. However, the flow can reach very low levels during the summer, with an average rate as low as 2 cubic feet (57 L) per second. Many man-made ponds exist within the watershed, typically constructed by damming small tributary streams with earth. These often serve as an impassable hindrance to fish, and are often stocked with fish not native to the area.

Many of the rocks in the watershed are part of the Twin Rivers Formation, consisting of sandstone and siltstone. The geography of the area was heavily shaped by glacial activity during the Vashon Glaciation, during which the creek bed was buried under roughly 3,000 feet (910 m) of ice. A series of glacial striations are found throughout the western portion of the watershed.

== History ==
The Salt Creek basin is within the traditional territory of the Klallam people, who referred to the creek as Klte-tun-ut in their Klallam language. A large Klallam village named after the creek was adjacent to it, one of three historic camp or village sites documented near the stream. Euro-American colonists arrived in the Olympic Peninsula the late 19th century. A significant logging industry emerged around nearby Port Crescent and some areas around the Salt Creek watershed were cleared for agricultural purposes. During World War II, coastal artillery was installed near the estuary of the creek at Camp Hayden. Paved road access to the creek was created at this time, as it had been previously accessible only through dirt trails and roads.

During the early 1950s, the Washington Department of Fisheries (WDF) extensively removed logjams and other wood obstructions from the river, maintaining a stream clearance unit. Although this was intended to clear the stream for the passage of salmon, it greatly damaged the stream and its usability by fish, leading to a loss of spawning gravel and pools, increased temperature, and decreased levels of groundwater. A series of three falls 3.1 miles (5.0 km) upstream from the mouth historically served as a barrier to migrating fish until higher water levels could be reached. This led to large numbers of fish accumulating downstream of the falls, rendering them vulnerable to legal and illegal fishing. In 1951, the WDF used explosives in a failed attempt to carve a channel through the bedrock between the falls. The WDF returned in 1961 and constructed concrete weirs, improving passage conditions. A fish ladder was installed on the creek in 1963 to allow coho salmon to better access the headwaters. The area subject to log clearing during the 1950s was later clearcut in the 1980s.

Chinook salmon and chum salmon also historically used the basin, but these ceased to be documented in the area by the early 2010s. Barriers such as culverts form an impediment to the passage of fish upstream, although many of these have been removed since the early 2000s. A dike dating to the early 1900s runs north-south across the creek's estuary, impeding the passage of fish between the two halves of the estuary. Much of the watershed is blocked off to anadromous fish by barriers such as man-made ponds.
