= Washington State Route 112 =

State highway in Clallam County, Washington, US

State Route 112
- SR 112 highlighted in red

Route information
- Auxiliary route of US 101
- Maintained by WSDOT
- Length: 61.31 mi (98.67 km)
- Existed: 1964–present
- Tourist routes: Strait of Juan de Fuca Highway

Major junctions
- West end: Makah Indian Reservation boundary near Neah Bay
- SR 113 near Clallam Bay
- East end: US 101 near Port Angeles

Location
- Country: United States
- State: Washington

Highway system
- State highways in Washington; Interstate; US; State; Scenic; Pre-1964; 1964 renumbering; Former
| ← SR 110 | → SR 113 |

State Route 112 (SR 112, named the Strait of Juan de Fuca Highway) is a state highway and scenic byway in the U.S. state of Washington. It runs east–west for 61 miles (98 km) along the Strait of Juan de Fuca in Clallam County, connecting the Makah Indian Reservation near Neah Bay to U.S. Route 101 (US 101) near Port Angeles.

== Route description ==
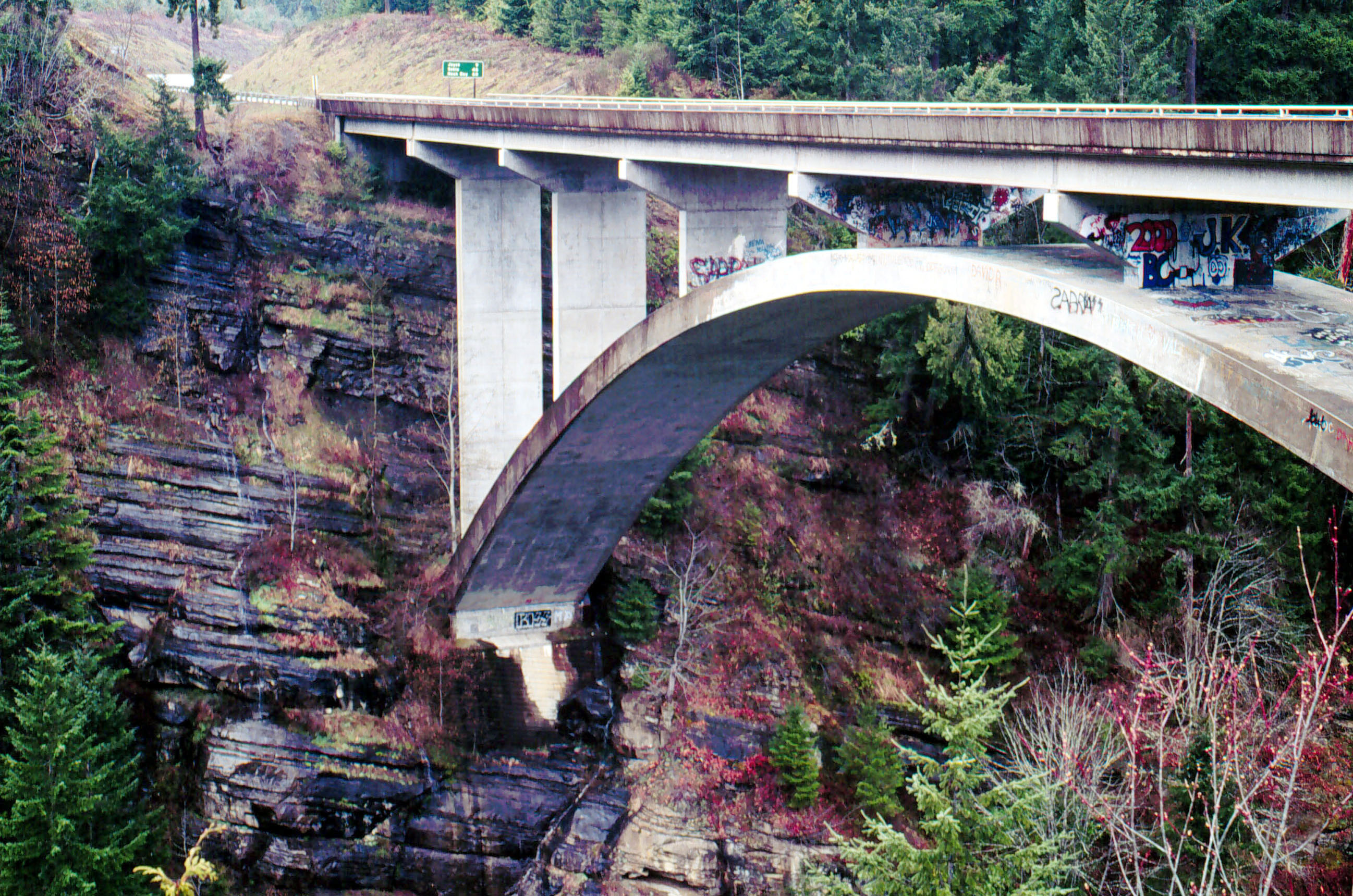
SR 112 crosses the Elwha River Gorge on a deck arch bridge located west of Port Angeles

SR 112 begins at the eastern boundary of the Makah Indian Reservation near the mouth of the Sail River. The highway continues west as Bayview Avenue to Neah Bay and Cape Flattery, the northwesternmost point in the contiguous United States. SR 112 travels southeast along the Strait of Juan de Fuca, following a meandering path along the forested foothills of the Northwest Olympic Mountains and crossing several creeks and streams. It also passes a number of resorts and inns, as well as public parks and scenic viewpoints looking across the strait at Vancouver Island. After crossing over the Hoko River near Hoko River State Park, the highway moves further inland before reaching the town of Sekiu and its nearby airport. SR 112 moves back onto the coast and turns south at Clallam Bay, passing through the town and following the Clallam River through a valley leading inland from the coast.

The highway leaves the Clallam River and reaches the foothills of Burnt Mountain at a junction with SR 113, which travels south to US 101 at Sappho. SR 112 turns east to follow the Pysht River through another valley that leads towards the strait, rejoining the coast at Pysht near Pillar Point. The highway continues southeast along the coastal bluffs, making hairpin turns to cross several creeks as they empty into the strait. After passing Twin Beach, SR 112 moves further inland and follows a former railroad grade that passes through a rural plain with several communities, including Disque, Joyce, and Ramapo near the Salt Creek Recreation Area. SR 112 passes near the Lower Elwha Indian Reservation and then turns south to cross the Elwha River gorge on a 564-foot-long (172 m) deck arch bridge. An interpretive center was built near the bridge in 2016 as part of the Elwha River dam removal and restoration project. The highway ends after the bridge at an intersection with US 101 west of Port Angeles and William R. Fairchild International Airport.

SR 112 is designated as the Strait of Juan de Fuca Highway, a National Scenic Byway that covers all 61 miles (98 km) of the route. The western end of the highway is also part of the Cape Flattery Tribal Scenic Byway, a state scenic byway that continues onto the Makah reservation to Neah Bay and Cape Flattery. The Washington State Transportation Commission also designated the section of SR 112 that lies west of SR 113 as the Korean Veterans Blue Star Memorial Highway in 2007 and the eastern half as the Vietnam Veterans Memorial Highway in 2008. SR 112 is maintained by the Washington State Department of Transportation (WSDOT), which conducts an annual survey on state highways to measure traffic volume in terms of annual average daily traffic. Measured traffic volumes on the highway in 2016 ranged from a minimum of 990 at its western terminus to 6,100 near the Elwha River Bridge. The highway is also a designated tsunami evacuation route for various communities along the strait, connecting to logging roads that lead uphill.

== History ==
The northwestern reach of the Olympic Peninsula was open to logging and settlement in the late 19th century, and a rough trail along the Strait of Juan de Fuca was used by American emigrants. The trail was upgraded to a wagon road in the 1920s and a parallel logging railroad owned by the Milwaukee Road was later built alongside it. The wagon road was maintained by the county government as County Road 1 until it was transferred to state control in 1937 and became part of Secondary State Highway 9A (SSH 9A), a highway connecting Sappho to Port Angeles via Pysht. The state government purchased right of way in 1947 to extend SSH 9A to Neah Bay, a year before the existing highway was paved.

By 1953, a road extending from Neah Bay to SSH 9A was completed and in June 1955, the roadway was added to SSH 9A, while the Sappho segment was deleted. A southern extension of SSH 9A to connect with US 101 near Queets, part of an extended coastal route to Hoquiam, was first proposed in the 1940s. The proposed highway was supported by the Clallam County government, who lobbied for a full study from the state government. The proposal was opposed by conservationists, organized by Polly Dyer, who embarked on a 22-mile (35 km) coastline hike in August 1958 and were joined by U.S. Supreme Court Justice William O. Douglas. The coastal highway was shelved for several years but approved by the U.S. Bureau of Outdoor Recreation in 1964, prompting more protests that resulted in its cancellation.

During the 1964 highway renumbering, SSH 9A became SR 112; the highway became a state scenic byway in 1967. The Sappho segment of SSH 9A later was readded to the state highway system in 1991 as SR 113.

On June 15, 2000, SR 112 became a National Scenic Byway named the Strait of Juan de Fuca Highway. The designation came amid efforts to restore the natural habitat of the region after decades of logging and erosion. It was dedicated in 2001 by local officials and representatives from the tourist and timber industries. The western section of SR 112 and SR 113 were designated as the "Korean War Veterans Blue Star Memorial Highways" by the state legislature in 2007 and dedicated in 2014.

Various sections of SR 112 have been damaged or destroyed by landslides, particularly those caused by winter storms, since the 1960s. A major landslide in early 1990 prompted WSDOT to consider abandonment of the highway between Burnt Mountain Road (now SR 113) and Port Angeles. A late December winter storm in 2008 resulted in floods that triggered a landslide that closed the highway near Joyce on January 8, 2009. Temporary repairs began on March 2 and only one-way traffic was allowed until the roadway reopened on March 12. Another set of five landslides in January 2021 caused several sections to be closed, including 8 miles (13 km) near the Pysht River. The highway was fully reopened in July.

== Major intersections ==
The entire highway is in Clallam County.

| Location | mi | km | Destinations | Notes |
|---|---|---|---|---|
| | 0.00 | 0.00 | Makah Indian Reservation boundary | Western terminus; continues west as Bayview Avenue |
| | 23.05 | 37.10 | SR 113 south (Burnt Mountain Road) – Sequim, Forks | |
| | 61.31 | 98.67 | US 101 (Olympic Highway) – Port Angeles, Forks, Aberdeen | Eastern terminus |
1.000 mi = 1.609 km; 1.000 km = 0.621 mi
