= East Twin Falls =

Waterfall in Washington (state), United States

Coordinates: 48°07′54″N 123°54′02″W

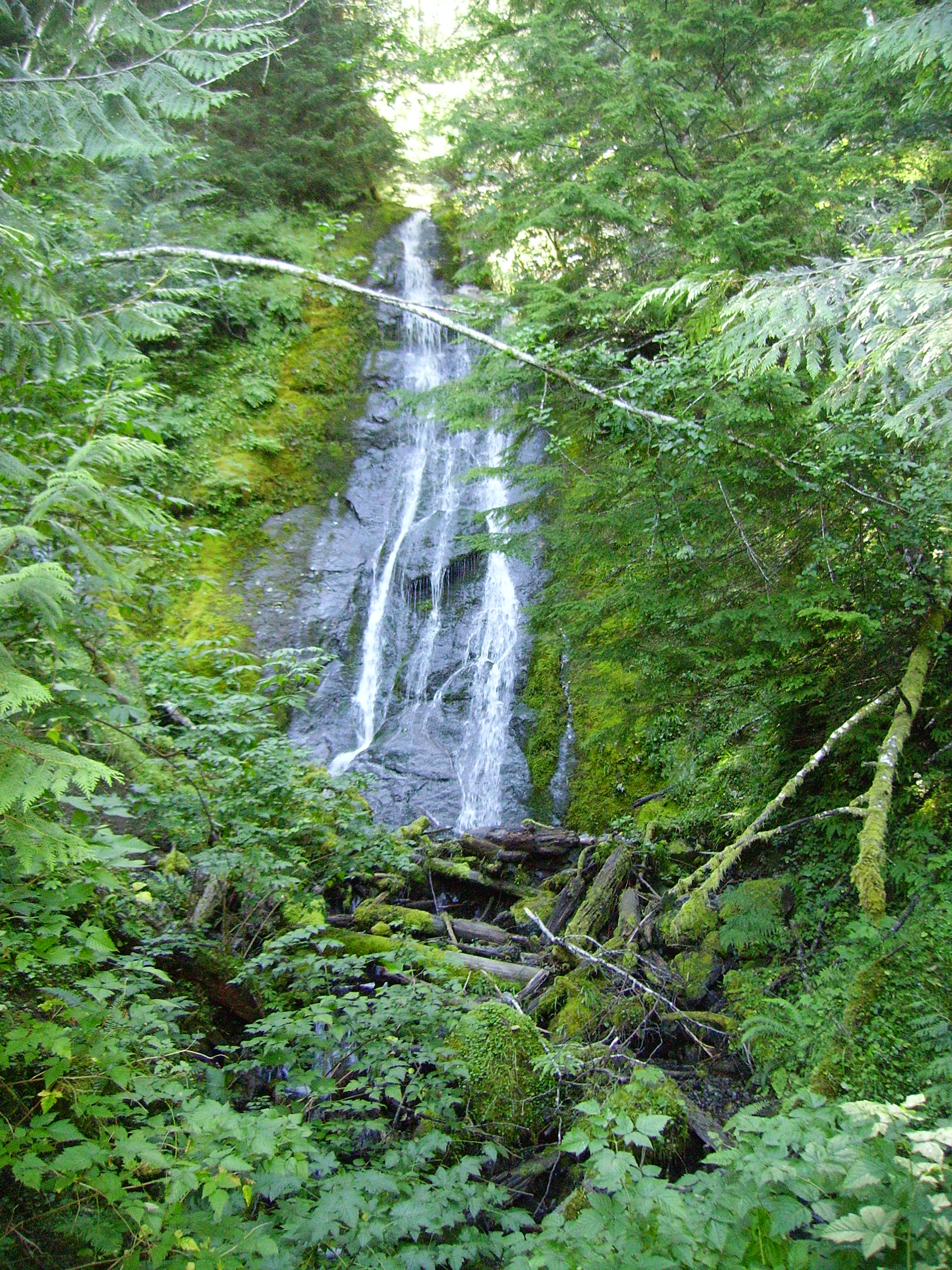
- East Twin Falls, 2007
- Interactive map of East Twin Falls
- Type: Horsetail
- Total height: 40 ft (12 m)

East Twin Falls is located about 15 miles west of Joyce, Washington. The falls are within the Olympic National Forest. The falls are located directly off of East Twin Road which is accessible from State Route 112. The Falls are approximately 40 feet in height.
