= Washington State Route 113 =

State highway in Washington County, Washington, US

State Route 113
- Burnt Mountain Road
- SR 113 highlighted in red

Route information
- Auxiliary route of US 101
- Maintained by WSDOT
- Length: 9.98 mi (16.06 km)
- Existed: 1991–present

Major junctions
- South end: US 101 at Sappho
- North end: SR 112 near Clallam Bay

Location
- Country: United States
- State: Washington

Highway system
- State highways in Washington; Interstate; US; State; Scenic; Pre-1964; 1964 renumbering; Former
| ← SR 112 | → SR 115 |

State Route 113 (SR 113), also known as Burnt Mountain Road, is a Washington state highway in Clallam County on the Olympic Peninsula. It connects U.S. Route 101 (US 101) at Sappho to SR 112 near Clallam Bay, traveling north along Beaver Creek and the Pysht River for 10 miles (16 km).

The highway follows a wagon road constructed in 1892 and maintained by the county government until it was transferred to the state highway system in 1937. It was part of Secondary State Highway 9A (SSH 9A), which connected Sappho to Port Angeles along the Strait of Juan de Fuca. The north–south section of SSH 9A was removed from the state highway system in 1955 and was transferred back to Clallam County and renamed Burnt Mountain Road.

The county road gained Forest Highway status in 1961 and was rebuilt and paved with federal and state funds over the following decade. Burnt Mountain Road was re-added to the state highway system in 1991 as SR 113, reusing a previous designation that had been replaced by SR 20 in 1973.

== Route description ==
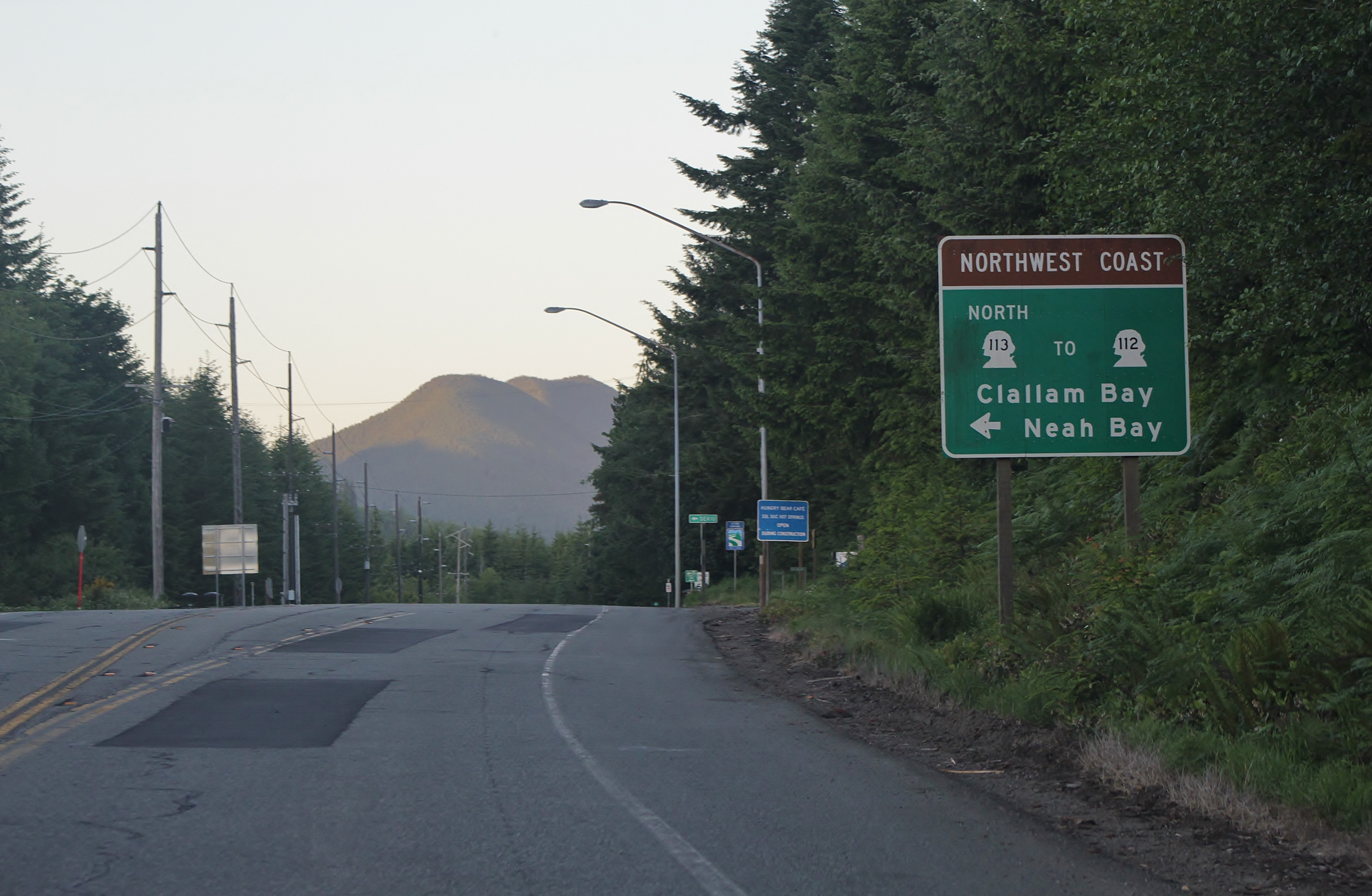
US 101 at the southern terminus of SR 113

SR 113 begins at a junction with US 101 in the community of Sappho, which lies on the Sol Duc River near Beaver and Lake Pleasant. The highway travels north on Burnt Mountain Road, which follows Beaver Creek upstream to Beaver Lake in the Olympic National Forest. The road then turns northeast as it climbs out from the Sol Duc Valley, leaving the national forest in the process, and makes several turns as it travels around Burnt Mountain and other ridges in the northern Olympic Mountains. SR 113 then follows the Pysht River north and terminates at a junction with SR 112, which continues north to Clallam Bay and east to Port Angeles.

The two-lane highway is 10 miles (16 km) long and serves mainly as a connector between US 101 and SR 112, traversing timberlands with few residences. SR 113 is maintained by the Washington State Department of Transportation (WSDOT), which conducts an annual survey on state highways to measure traffic volume in terms of annual average daily traffic. Average traffic volumes on the highway in 2016 ranged from a minimum of 1,100 vehicles at SR 112 to a maximum of 1,200 vehicles at US 101. The corridor is also served by a Clallam Transit bus route that connects Forks to Neah Bay, with intermediate stops at both termini of SR 113.

== History ==
An unpaved wagon road connecting Forks to Clallam Bay was constructed by pioneer E.C. Burlinghame in 1892. The Bloedel–Donovan Logging Company completed a logging railroad along the road in 1924 from Beaver to Sekiu to transport harvested timber. By the late 1920s, the dirt road had been surfaced with gravel road by the Clallam County government.

Burnt Mountain Road was added to the state highway system in 1937 as part of Secondary State Highway 9A (SSH 9A), which connected US 101 and Primary State Highway 9 at Sappho to Port Angeles. In June 1955, the state government swapped highways with the Clallam County government, extending SSH 9A west from Clallam Bay to Neah Bay and transferring the north–south section from Sappho to the county. The narrow and winding road remained in heavy use by tourists and logging trucks, prompting county and state officials to lobby the United States Forest Service (USFS) for Forest Highway status.

The USFS added Burnt Mountain Road to the Forest Highway system in January 1961 and also approved $150,000 in requested funds (equivalent to $1.17 million in 2023 dollars) to rebuild and pave the road. Construction of the road's new alignment began in 1962 near Sappho after the county agreed to contribute $220,000 (equivalent to $1.54 million in 2023 dollars) to the project. Crews contracted by the Federal Highway Administration fully reopened the road in August 1968, but it remained unpaved until 1972. A section of the new Burnt Mountain Road was discovered to have settled and was rebuilt in 1975 using $200,000 in state funding (equivalent to $879,640 in 2023 dollars).

SSH 9A was later renumbered to SR 112 in 1964 under the new sign route (now state route) system. In a 1971 study, the Washington State Department of Highways recommended that Burnt Mountain Road be re-added to the state highway system as SR 111, but it remained under county control. The state legislature approved the restoration of the corridor to the state highway system in 1991, assigning SR 113 to it. The SR 113 designation had been created in 1964 for the Discovery Bay–Coupeville highway, which was replaced by SR 20 in 1973.

SR 113 and the western section of SR 112 were designated as the "Korean War Veterans Blue Star Memorial Highways" by the state legislature in 2007 and dedicated in 2014.

== Major intersections ==
The entire route is in Clallam County.

| Location | mi | km | Destinations | Notes |
|---|---|---|---|---|
| | 0.00 | 0.00 | US 101 (Olympic Highway) – Port Angeles, Forks | |
| | 9.98 | 16.06 | SR 112 – Neah Bay, Port Angeles | |
1.000 mi = 1.609 km; 1.000 km = 0.621 mi
