= Joyce, Washington =

Unincorporated community in Washington, United States

- Unincorporated community
- Location within the state of Washington
- Coordinates: 48°08′11″N 123°44′03″W
- Country: United States
- State: Washington
- County: Clallam
- Founded: approx. 1913
- Elevation: 358 ft (109 m)
- Time zone: UTC-8 (Pacific (PST))
  - Summer (DST): UTC-7 (PDT)
- ZIP code: 98343
- GNIS feature ID: 1521482

Joyce is an unincorporated community in Clallam County, Washington, United States.

Founded around 1913 by Joseph M. Joyce, Joyce is located on scenic State Highway 112, 16 miles west of Port Angeles and 33 miles east of Clallam Bay. The town of Joyce has a historic general store originally opened in 1911, museum, cafe, and other business establishments. Joyce has an annual celebration called Joyce Daze usually held around the beginning of August. Joyce is also home to the Crescent School District.

== Climate ==
This region experiences warm (but not hot) and dry summers, with no average monthly temperatures above 71.6 °F. According to the Köppen Climate Classification system, Joyce has a warm-summer Mediterranean climate, abbreviated "Csb" on climate maps.

== Earthquake preparations ==
Joyce is located in the Cascadia subduction zone and the community is susceptible to disruptions that might be caused by a possible catastrophic earthquake. As the town contains only one road into the community, Joyce may be severed from aid after an earthquake. Residents set up the Joyce Emergency Planning and Preparation (JEPP) agency to provide food and shelter for the approximately thirty days it is estimated that might be required to restore supply routes. This was spurred after seeing the devastation from a lack of pre-planning in the aftermath of Hurricane Katrina.

== See also ==
- East Twin Falls, located about 15 mi. west
