= Polly Dyer =

Pauline "Polly" Tomkiel Dyer (February 13, 1920–November 20, 2016) was an American conservationist. For six decades, Dyer worked to preserve public lands in the state of Washington through lobbying, community organizing, fundraising, and writing. She helped achieve wilderness designations for the Olympic, Mount Rainier, and North Cascades national parks, and kept the Olympic National Park free of roads and logging.

== Early life and education ==
Pauline Tomkiel was born in Honolulu, Hawaii, on February 13, 1920. Her father was an engineer in the United States Coast Guard, and the family moved frequently, residing in Philadelphia, Baltimore, Connecticut, Florida, and Ketchikan over the years.

Dyer graduated from Eastern High School, Baltimore, Maryland. Although she had been accepted by the University of California, Berkeley, Dyer did not begin college until 1961 when she attended evening school at Harvard University. She transferred her credits from Harvard and received a degree in geography at the University of Washington in 1970.

== Conservation and activism ==
Pauline married John Dyer on August 7, 1945. John had been a Sierra Club official and was then working for Alaska Fish Oil Extractors. The couple lived in Berkeley, California from 1947 to 1950, where they were active in the Sierra Club. In 1950, they moved to Auburn, Washington, where they joined the Mountaineers. She climbed Mount Rainier with the Mountaineers. She co-founded the Pacific Northwest Chapter of the Sierra Club, the first chapter not in California.

She gave testimony in support of the Wilderness Act of 1946 before the U.S. Senate. In 1948, she founded Olympic Park Associates, a community group to fight illegal logging in the Olympic National Forest, and served as its president for 30 years. Dyer was appointed by Governor Arthur Langlie to a committee to investigate potential logging in the Olympic National Forest by transferring it to the Forest Service; the minority report written by Dyer and Emily Haig swayed the committee to decide against the transfer.

In 1953, Dyer helped defeat the project to build Echo Park Dam in Danosaur National Monument.

In 1955, Dyer was appointed the chair of the Seattle Mountaineers Conservation Committee. She was one of the founding board members of the North Cascades Conservation Council, organized in 1957 to lobby for national park status for the North Cascades, which was achieved in 1968. The North Cascades was given wilderness designation 20 years later. Dyer advocated for an expansion of North Cascades National Park.

In 1957, she became the first woman president of the Federation of Western Outdoor Clubs.

In 1958, Dyer helped organize a 3-day beach hike along the Olympic Coast to draw attention to a proposed coastal highway. Former U.S. Supreme Court Justice William O. Douglas led the hike. The hike covered 22 miles from Lake Ozette to Rialto Beach, and consisted of Dyer, Douglas, and 70 other participants, including reporters who later wrote articles arguing against the coastal highway (which was never built). Dyer's efforts helped keep Olympic National Park roadless and closed to logging.

Dyer lobbied for Glacier Peak Wilderness Area designation, which was granted in 1964. She testified before the United States Senate in support of the 1964 Wilderness Act, to which she contributed the phrase "untrammeled by man", and she fought for the Washington State Wilderness Act in 1984, which added 19 new wilderness areas. Dyer worked to have an area of the Olympic coastline up to Shi-Shi Beach included in Public Law 94-567.

She spoke at timber-industry conferences and served on regional boards of environmental groups. She served on the Sierra Club national board of directors from 1960 to 1967. In 1974, she began working as the Public Services Coordinator and then Continuing Environmental Education Director for the Institute for Environmental Studies at the University of Washington, where she developed conferences and programs on environmental topics for twenty years. She was a citizen member of Washington's first Forest Practices board from 1974 to 1979.

== Recognition ==
In 1979, Dyer received the Washington Environmental Council's environmental protection award. She was honored by Washington League of Women Voters in 1998, and in 2001, was honored by Washington Environmental Council as Environmental Hero. Seattle mayor Mike McGinn declared February 13, 2010 (her 90th birthday) Polly Dyer Day

Western Washington University awarded Dyer an honorary Doctorate of Human Letters in 2014 in recognition of her conservation achievements. Dyer's papers are maintained in a collection at the University of Washington.

== Death ==
Dyer died at age 96 on November 20, 2016, in Shoreline, Washington.
