= Salt Creek Recreation Area =

Coordinates: 48.15°N 123.67°W

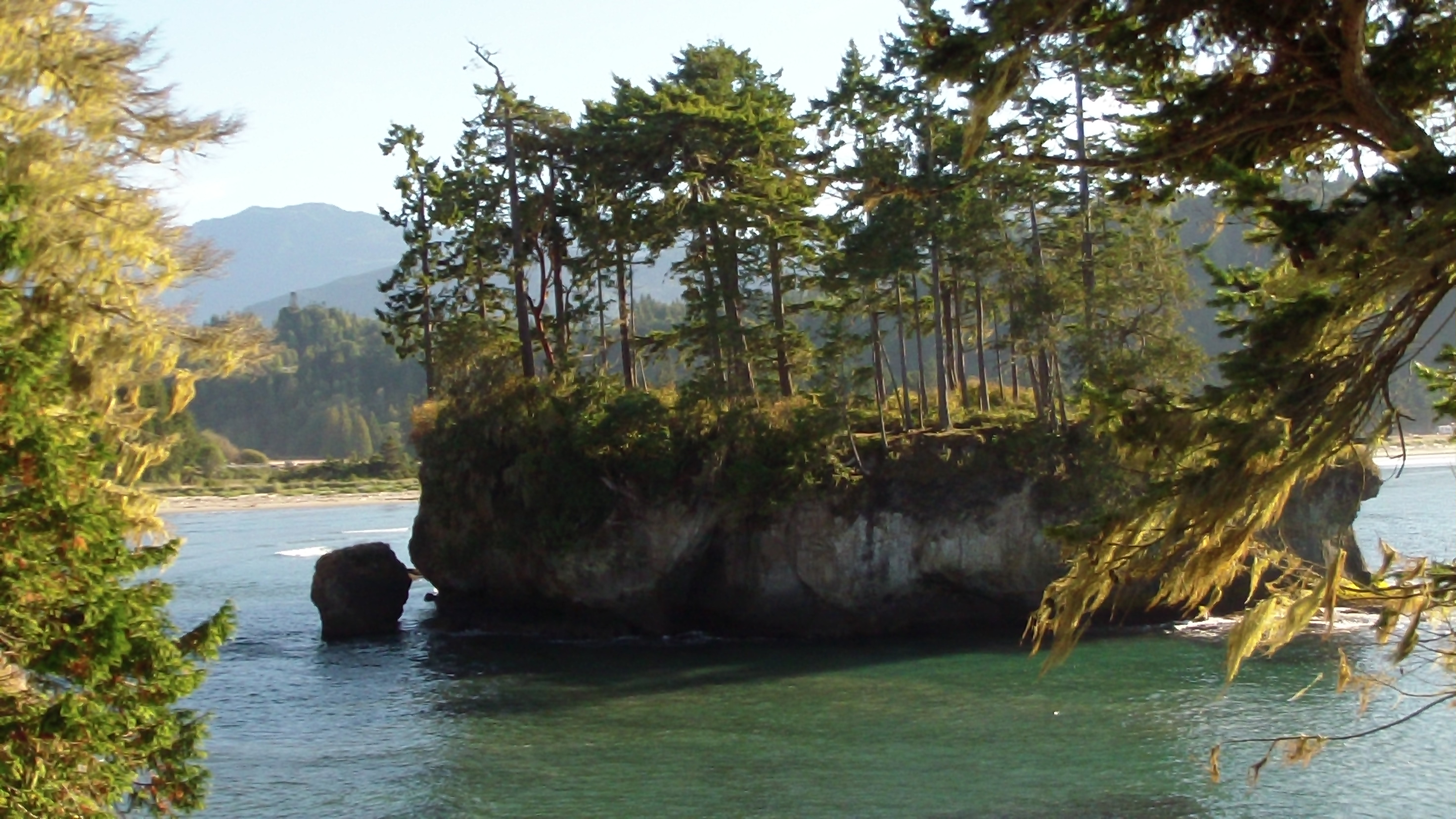

Salt Creek Recreation Area is a 196-acre park located on Salt Creek about 15 miles west of Port Angeles, Washington on Washington State Route 112 near Joyce. The park was previously Camp Hayden, a World War II military camp built 1942–1945. The site was established as the Striped Peak Military Reservation in 1941, renamed as Camp Hayden on 22 October 1942, and renamed again as Fort Hayden on 17 April 1944. It was named for Brigadier General John Louis Hayden, a former commander of the Harbor Defenses of Puget Sound. It was purchased by the Federal General Services Administration after the war. There are still several structures left from the fort, including two large casemates which sheltered 16" guns and several other structures. The 16-inch battery was Battery 131, with two ex-Navy 16-inch Mark 2 guns capable of firing a one-ton projectile around 28 miles connected by a large magazine bunker. The camp also had Battery 249, which had two 6-inch guns with a bunker housing magazines and fire control equipment.

The park now has a number of camping spots, most overlooking the Strait of Juan de Fuca and mountains all year long. The park provides access to Tongue Point and Striped Peak along with sandy beaches, upland forests, rocky bluffs, and several trails. The recreation area complete with a baseball field, basketball court, picnic shelter, playground, and horseshoe pits is also available for use. The park hosts the Salt Creek Invitational cross country meet in mid-September every year, featuring high school teams from around western Washington. Beautiful views are also a big part of Salt Creek such as those from the top of Striped Peak, of Crescent Bay, of the Strait, and of Vancouver Island, British Columbia.

== Gallery ==
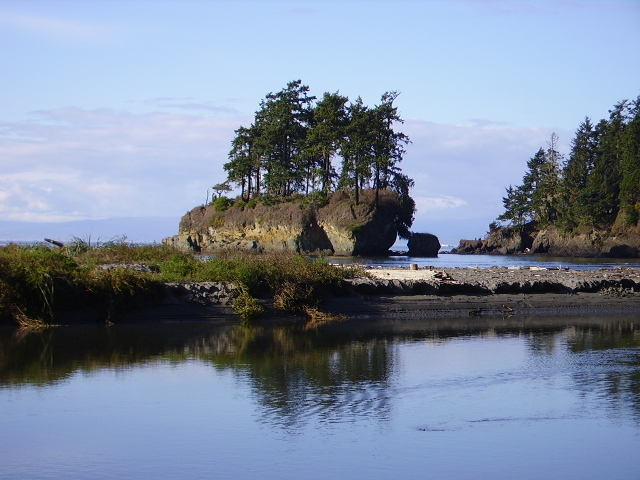
View of Beach Area.

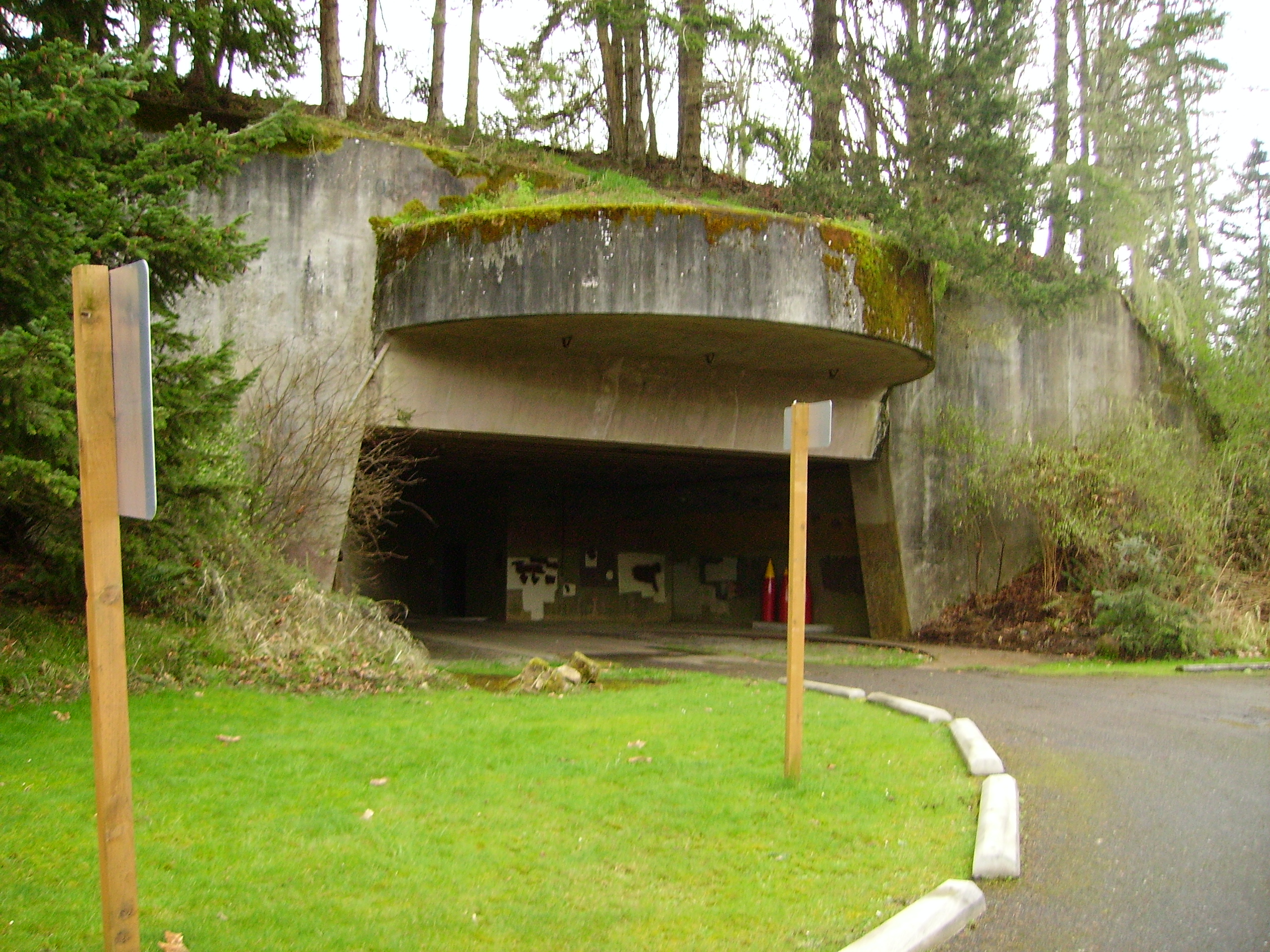
16 inch gun casemate, front view, where the gun was mounted. Note the red-colored projectiles.

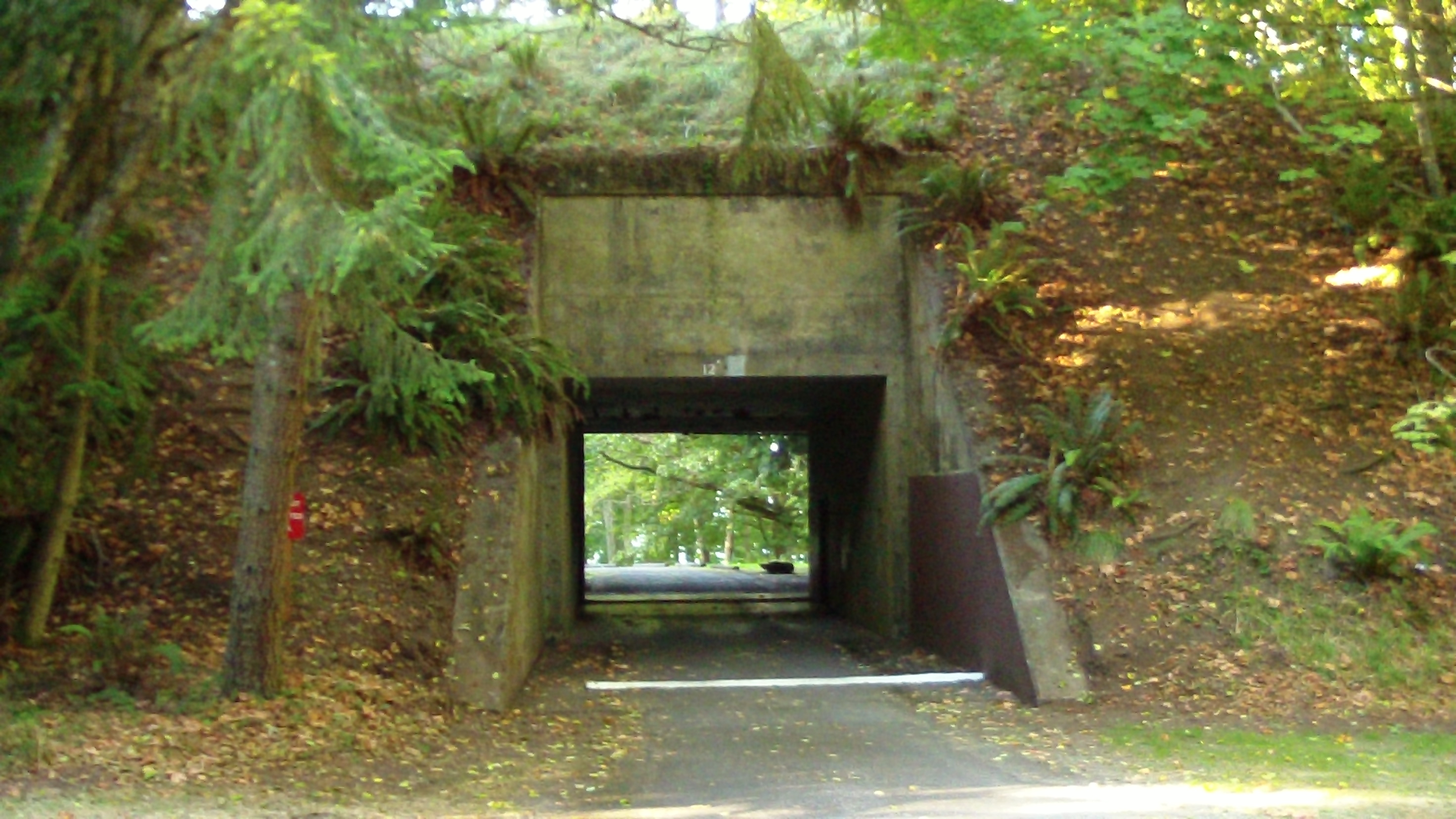
Back view of a casemate.

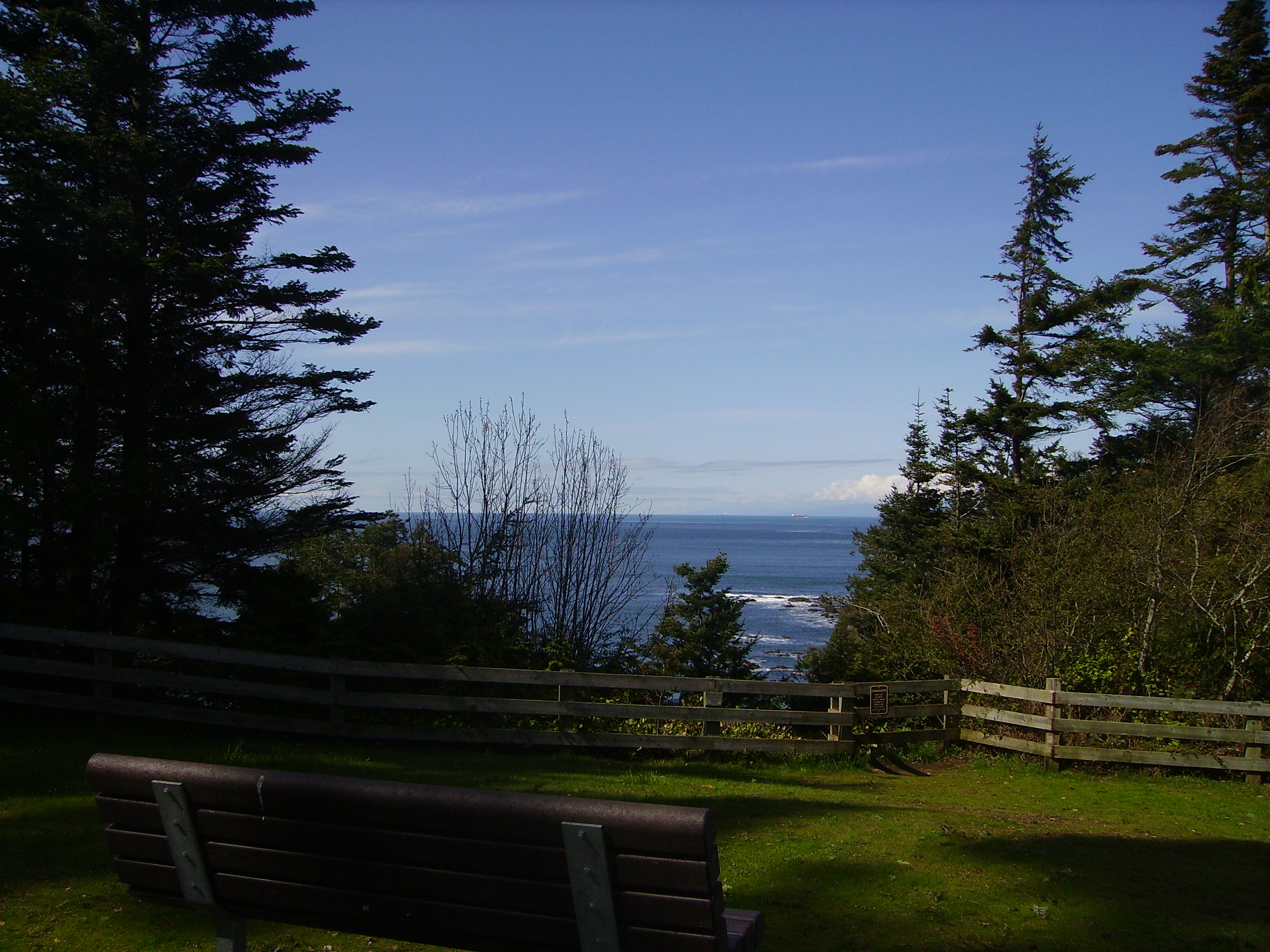
View of ocean from near campground.
