= Striped Peak =

Mountain in Washington (state), United States

Highest point
- Elevation: 1,166 ft (355 m) NGVD 29
- Prominence: 966 ft (294 m)
- Coordinates: 48°09′23″N 123°41′05″W

Geography
- Location: Clallam County, Washington, U.S.
- Parent range: Olympic Mountains

Climbing
- Easiest route: Hike

Striped Peak is a mountain located approximately 12 miles (19 km) west of Port Angeles, Washington. It is located directly off the Strait of Juan de Fuca and rises to 1,166 feet (355 m). The mountain used to be part of Camp Hayden; there are still accessible bunkers located on the mountain. To the east is located Freshwater Bay and to the west Crescent Bay. Also located to west is the Salt Creek Recreation Area and Tongue Point.

Striped Peak was named in 1846 by the British naval surveyor Henry Kellett due to a "landslip occurring down its face". The landslip is no longer visible.

Striped Peak has a number of trails and roads that visitors can use to access points on the mountain. There a number of viewpoints which have views of the strait, Victoria, British Columbia, Vancouver Island, Sooke, British Columbia, and surrounding coast and hills.
