= Clallam Bay, Washington =

- Census-designated place
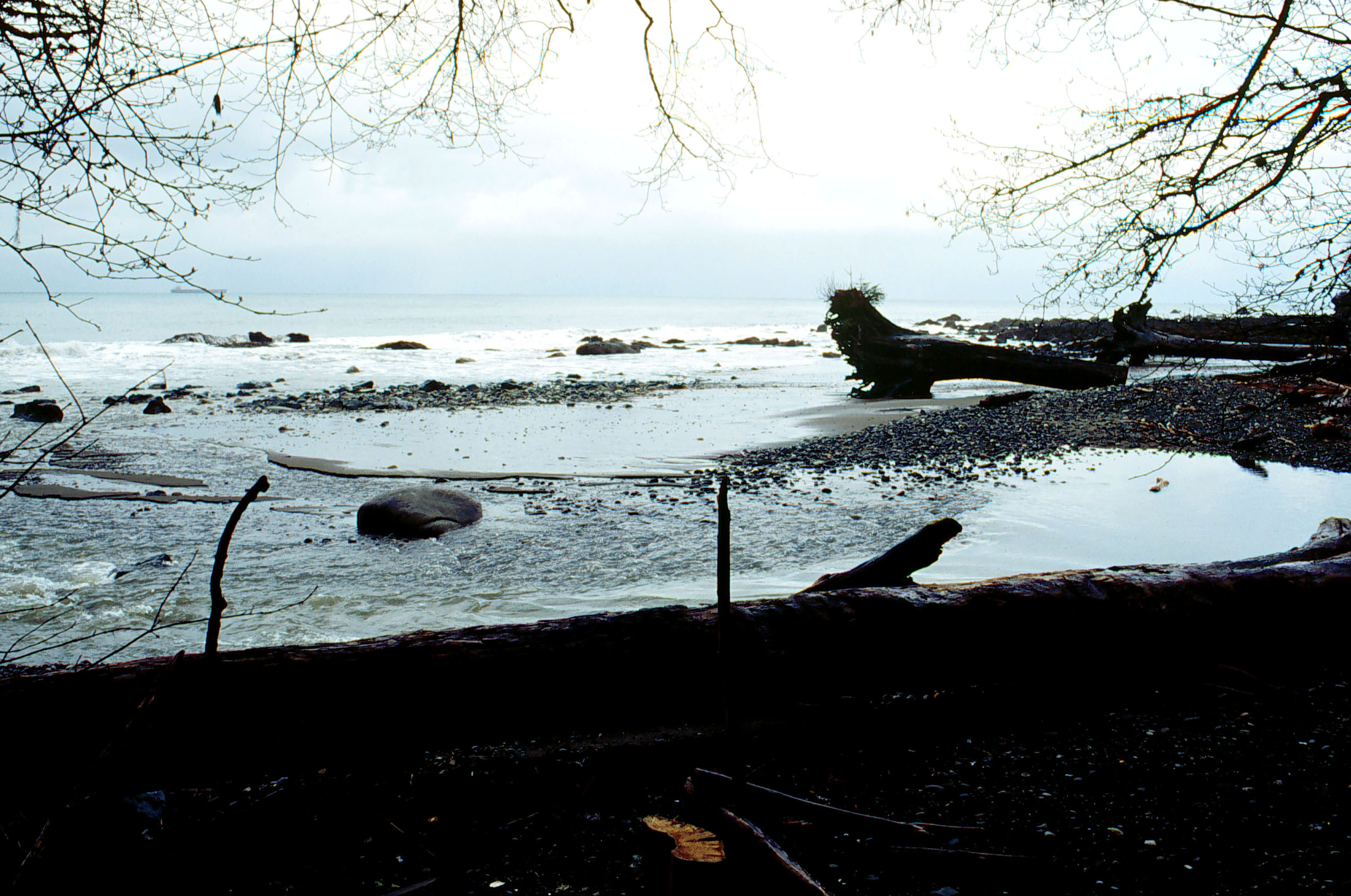
- The mouth of the Clallam River, located in Clallam Bay County Park.

- Location within the state of Washington
- Coordinates: 48°15′05″N 124°15′20″W
- Country: United States
- State: Washington
- County: Clallam

Area
  - Total: 0.56 sq mi (1.46 km^{2})
  - Land: 0.56 sq mi (1.46 km^{2})
  - Water: 0 sq mi (0.0 km^{2})
- Elevation: 13 ft (4.0 m)

Population (2020)
  - Total: 386
  - Density: 685/sq mi (264/km^{2})
- Time zone: UTC-8 (Pacific (PST))
  - Summer (DST): UTC-7 (PDT)
- ZIP code: 98326
- FIPS code: 53-12525
- GNIS feature ID: 2586730

Clallam Bay is an unincorporated community and census-designated place (CDP) in Clallam County, Washington, United States, at the mouth of the Clallam River into Clallam Bay. Known for its natural environment and hunting, Clallam Bay is partially reliant on tourism. Clallam Bay is considered the twin city of nearby Sekiu. As of the 2020 census, the population of Clallam Bay was 386, up from 363 at 2010.

== History ==
Clallam Bay was founded in the 1880s as a steamboat stop. It became a mill town in 1890. Two years later, the mill burned, and making barrels for West Clallam Bay's tanning extract became its main industry. In 1905, the lighthouse at Slip Point was lighted on April Fool's Day.

Sekiu Point (pronounced "See'-kew"), the western cape of Clallam Bay, was first charted by Captain Henry "OG" Kellett in 1847. The town of Sekiu was founded as "West Clallam" in 1870, by A.J. Martin who built a salmon cannery to be nearer the fishing grounds. The area boomed before the turn of the century when a leather tanning extract was produced here by the Pacific Tanning Extract Company established in 1887. Sekiu crashed in 1893 when the demand for the extract ceased, and hundreds of men were left unemployed. People turned to fishing, and later logging. From 1902 to 1907, D.A. Robinson logged here, building a railroad with what was then the longest railroad bridge in the world. The 808-foot (246 m) long, 202-foot (62 m) high bridge spanned Charlie Creek.

== Geography and climate ==
The community of Clallam Bay is located in northwestern Clallam County, where the Clallam River enters the southeastern side of Clallam Bay, a small indentation in the Strait of Juan de Fuca. Washington State Route 112 passes through the community, leading south 16 miles (26 km) via Washington State Route 113 to Sappho on US 101. To the west, Route 112 leads 2 miles (3 km) to Sekiu at the west end of Clallam Bay, and 20 miles (32 km) to Neah Bay.

Climate data for Clallam Bay, Washington
Month	Jan	Feb	Mar	Apr	May	Jun	Jul	Aug	Sep	Oct	Nov	Dec	Year
Record high °F (°C)	65 (18)	68 (20)	75 (24)	79 (26)	92 (33)	96 (36)	102 (39)	99 (37)	97 (36)	83 (28)	67 (19)	66 (19)	102 (39)
Mean daily maximum °F (°C)	45.8 (7.7)	48.8 (9.3)	52.0 (11.1)	56.6 (13.7)	61.9 (16.6)	66.0 (18.9)	71.1 (21.7)	72.5 (22.5)	69.2 (20.7)	58.7 (14.8)	49.2 (9.6)	44.2 (6.8)	58.0 (14.4)
Mean daily minimum °F (°C)	35.4 (1.9)	34.8 (1.6)	36.3 (2.4)	38.4 (3.6)	43.0 (6.1)	47.3 (8.5)	50.4 (10.2)	50.6 (10.3)	47.3 (8.5)	42.3 (5.7)	37.9 (3.3)	34.1 (1.2)	41.5 (5.3)
Record low °F (°C)	3 (−16)	4 (−16)	8 (−13)	26 (−3)	28 (−2)	30 (−1)	34 (1)	34 (1)	27 (−3)	26 (−3)	8 (−13)	6 (−14)	3 (−16)
Average precipitation inches (mm)	14.41 (366)	10.71 (272)	8.72 (221)	5.49 (139)	2.80 (71)	2.07 (53)	1.60 (41)	1.82 (46)	2.68 (68)	7.96 (202)	13.44 (341)	13.94 (354)	85.64 (2,175)
Average snowfall inches (cm)	1.9 (4.8)	2.0 (5.1)	0.7 (1.8)	0.1 (0.25)	0 (0)	0 (0)	0 (0)	0 (0)	0 (0)	0 (0)	1.4 (3.6)	1.6 (4.1)	7.7 (20)
Source 1:
Source 2:

== Demographics ==
Historical population
Census	Pop.	Note	%±
2010	363		—
2020	386		6.3%
U.S. Decennial Census; 1970 1980 1990; 2000 2010

Clallam Bay first appeared as a census designated place in the 2010 U.S. census.
