= Pysht, Washington =

Unincorporated community in Washington, United States

- Unincorporated community
- Location within Washington (state)
- Coordinates: 48°11′54″N 124°06′59″W
- Country: United States
- State: Washington
- County: Clallam
- Elevation: 16 ft (4.9 m)
- Time zone: UTC-8 (Pacific (PST))
  - Summer (DST): UTC-7 (PDT)
- GNIS feature ID: 1524729

Pysht is an unincorporated community located on the Olympic Peninsula in Clallam County, Washington, United States and is situated near the mouth the Pysht River.

== History ==
The area was originally home to the Klallam village of Pysht, while European Americans arrived in the 1860s. Michigan-based Merrill and Ring was established in 1886 purchased several homesteads in the Pysht Valley to log the area, later setting up logging camps and a company town at Pysht. At its height, it housed 500 people and included a post office, company store, schoolhouse, hospital, electric plant, movie hall, and a port. A county road (now State Route 112) was completed in 1920. The original Klallam village was demolished in the 1920s by loggers seeking to build a lumber mill while its residents were working in other areas.

== Geography ==
The community lies on the Strait of Juan de Fuca near the mouth of the Pysht River, which flows southwest to northeast. The community is accessible via State Route 112. Directly east of the community is Pillar Point County Park.
