= Sappho, Washington =

Unincorporated community in Washington, United States

- Unincorporated community
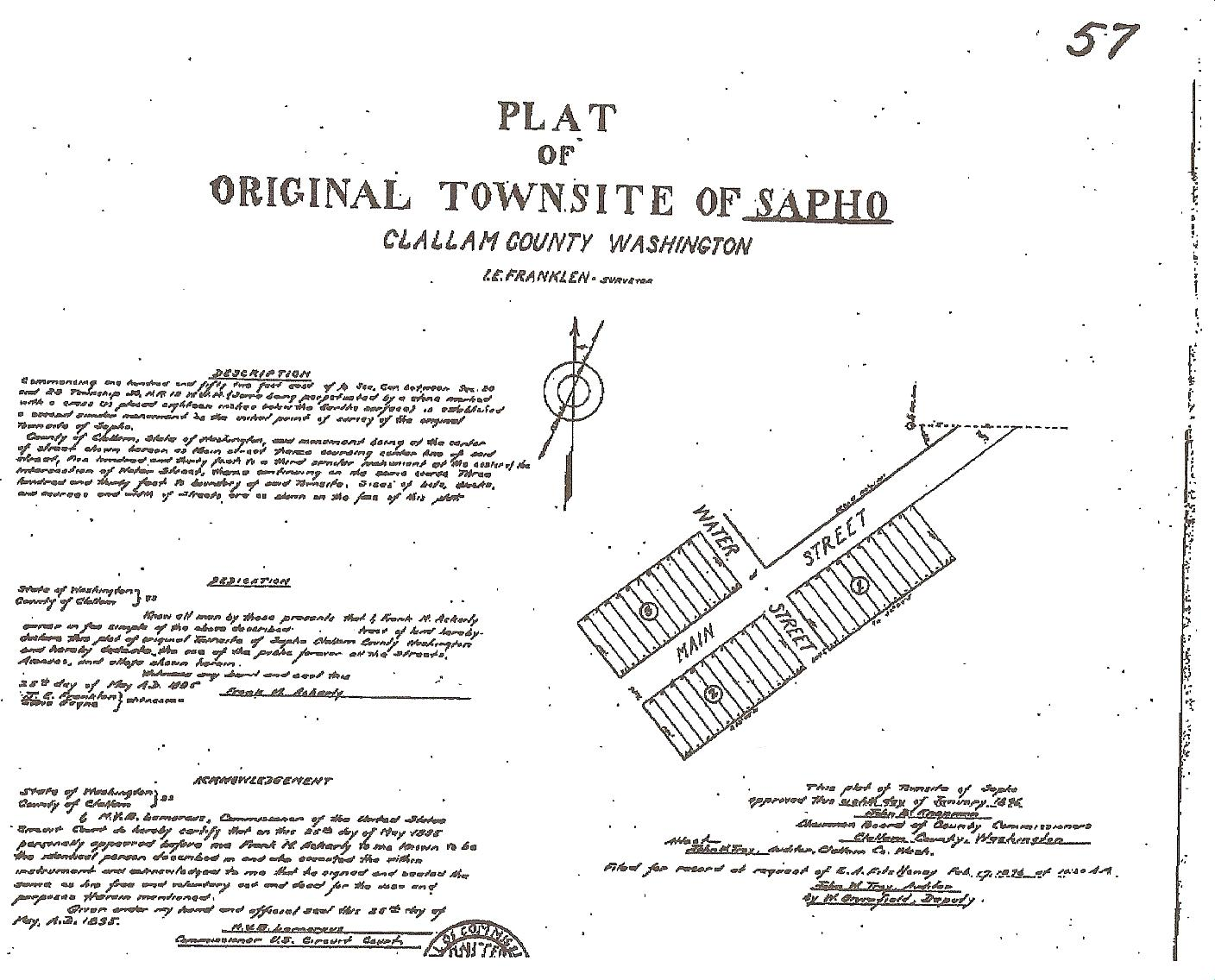
- Sapho Homestead Document, 1895

- Location within Washington (state)
- Coordinates: 48°04′12″N 124°16′46″W
- Country: United States
- State: Washington
- County: Clallam
- Elevation: 459 ft (140 m)
- Time zone: UTC-8 (Pacific (PST))
  - Summer (DST): UTC-7 (PDT)
- ZIP code: 98305
- GNIS feature ID: 1525435

Sappho is an unincorporated community in Clallam County, Washington, United States. The town is located at the intersection of U.S. Route 101 and State Route 113, in a largely forested area, and features parks and recreational facilities.

== History ==
Sappho is a former logging area. The town was founded by Martin Van Buren Lamoreux, who left St. John, Kansas in 1889 with 8 of his 10 children, his second wife and her 3 children from a prior marriage. Arriving in Seattle, some of the party settled on Lake Union, but Lamoreux, thinking that land worthless, set out for the Olympic Peninsula. Traveling by steamer from Seattle, they landed at an Indian settlement called Pysht on the Strait of Juan de Fuca and hiked inland 20 miles through the rainforest to their claim. The town was named for the Greek poet Sappho, whom Lamoreux admired. The town was organized so all family members had a duty. Lamoreux was the postmaster and was called "Judge" because he had read law in his youth, and was appointed Justice of the Peace for that district.

Lamoreux's homestead in 1895 was originally called Sapho and was located 0.6 miles (0.97 km) from US 101 on Main Street (now State Route 113). The original town burned down leaving only the school house intact.

Sappho's post office closed in May 1972, after the area's population had plummeted.

== Climate ==
Sappho has a very wet oceanic climate (Köppen Cfb) typical of the west coast of North America from Aberdeen northwards. Rainfall is slightly less heavy than in Forks further south and closer to the Olympic Mountains, but Sappho is still wetter than anywhere in the contiguous United States east of the Cascades, and around four times wetter than the eastern half of Clallam County.

Climate data for Sappho
Month	Jan	Feb	Mar	Apr	May	Jun	Jul	Aug	Sep	Oct	Nov	Dec	Year
Record high °F (°C)	65 (18)	68 (20)	76 (24)	78 (26)	92 (33)	96 (36)	103 (39)	99 (37)	97 (36)	83 (28)	67 (19)	66 (19)	103 (39)
Mean daily maximum °F (°C)	43.3 (6.3)	46.7 (8.2)	50.8 (10.4)	55.2 (12.9)	62.1 (16.7)	67.6 (19.8)	73.1 (22.8)	73.1 (22.8)	69.8 (21.0)	59.7 (15.4)	48.5 (9.2)	43.6 (6.4)	57.8 (14.3)
Mean daily minimum °F (°C)	33.0 (0.6)	33.9 (1.1)	34.8 (1.6)	37.4 (3.0)	41.8 (5.4)	46.1 (7.8)	49.2 (9.6)	49.6 (9.8)	47.1 (8.4)	41.9 (5.5)	36.7 (2.6)	33.7 (0.9)	40.4 (4.7)
Record low °F (°C)	3 (−16)	4 (−16)	8 (−13)	26 (−3)	28 (−2)	31 (−1)	34 (1)	34 (1)	27 (−3)	26 (−3)	8 (−13)	6 (−14)	3 (−16)
Average precipitation inches (mm)	13.09 (332)	11.57 (294)	9.40 (239)	6.96 (177)	3.94 (100)	2.68 (68)	1.86 (47)	2.18 (55)	3.80 (97)	9.06 (230)	13.26 (337)	15.24 (387)	93.05 (2,363)
Average snowfall inches (cm)	8.0 (20)	2.4 (6.1)	3.3 (8.4)	0.1 (0.25)	0.0 (0.0)	0.0 (0.0)	0.0 (0.0)	0.0 (0.0)	0.0 (0.0)	0.0 (0.0)	0.8 (2.0)	3.5 (8.9)	18.1 (46)
Average precipitation days	16	14	14	13	12	11	8	9	10	13	14	16	149
