= Hoko River =

River in the U.S. state of Washington

Coordinates: 48°17′5″N 124°21′52″W

Location
- Country: United States

Physical characteristics
- Source
  - location: Olympic Mountains
- Mouth
  - location: Pacific Ocean
  - elevation: Sea level
- Length: 25 mi (40 km)
- Basin size: 75 mi^{2} (190 km^{2})
- Discharge
  - average: 397 cu ft/s (11.2 m^{3}/s)

The Hoko River is a river in the U.S. state of Washington. It originates in the foothills of the Olympic Mountains, and runs about 25 miles (40 km) to the Pacific Ocean through a rugged landscape that has been heavily logged. Its largest tributary is the Little Hoko River, which joins at river mile 3.5-mile (5.6 km). The lower 1 mile (1.6 km) of the Hoko River is estuarine. The Hoko watershed supports chinook, chum, coho, and winter steelhead, with over 48 miles (77 km) of stream miles that provide suitable spawning habitat.

Because the Hoko River, like the nearby Pysht River, is brushy, full of snags, and often carries tannin stained water, it is known as a "cedar creek".

The name Hoko is of Makah origin and refers to the large projecting rock at the river mouth.

The Hoko River is the namesake of the Late Eocene Hoko River Formation, which was formally described in 1976 by Parke D. Snavely, Jr. et al from outcrops along the river.

Sites along the Hoko River have proved it to be an ideal location for preserving artifacts, bones, antlers, and baskets from the past. Hooks, cordage used for lines, and drying racks made from wood have all been found near the Hoko River sites. These artifacts' production is dated to around 1000 BCE.

== See also ==
- List of rivers of Washington (state)
