= Pysht River =

River in Washington, United States

- Location of the mouth of the Pysht River in Washington
- Native name: pəšc̕t (Klallam)

Location
- Country: United States
- State: Washington
- County: Clallam

Physical characteristics
- Source: Olympic Mountains
  - coordinates: 48°9′49″N 124°16′13″W
  - elevation: 1,350 ft (410 m)
- Mouth: Strait of Juan de Fuca
  - coordinates: 48°12′15″N 124°6′16″W
  - elevation: 0 ft (0 m)
- Length: 16.3 mi (26.2 km)
- Basin size: 54 sq mi (140 km^{2})
- Discharge
  - location: river mile 4.9
  - average: 167.2 cu ft/s (4.73 m^{3}/s)
  - minimum: 2.3 cu ft/s (0.065 m^{3}/s)
  - maximum: 1,990 cu ft/s (56 m^{3}/s)

The Pysht River (/ˈpɪʃt/ PISHT) is a stream in the U.S. state of Washington. It originates near Ellis Mountain in the northern Olympic Mountains on the Olympic Peninsula and flows generally north, emptying into the Strait of Juan de Fuca. The Pysht and nearby Hoko River are the two largest streams flowing into the southwestern portion of the Strait of Juan de Fuca. The watershed of the Pysht River drains a region of industrial forest lands; 98% of the watershed is zoned commercial forestry and the remainder rural. Nearly all of the forests have been logged at least once and most trees are less than thirty years old. The upper portions of the watershed, which feature steep gradients, are owned by the United States Forest Service. The lower reaches, with low gradients, are largely owned by two industrial forest owners.

The name of the Pysht River comes from the Klallam (Salishan) pəšc̕t, perhaps meaning "against the wind or current".

== Course ==
The Pysht River originates near Ellis Mountain in the northwestern Olympic Mountains of Olympic National Forest. It flows southeast a short distance before turning northeast and leaving the national forest and the mountainous country to enter more rolling and hilly terrain. It collects the tributaries Needham Creek and Green Creek less than a mile upriver from its confluence with the South Fork Pysht River. The South Fork originates in the northern Olympic Mountains and flows north and west to join the main stem Pysht. Tributaries of the South Fork include the West Fork Pysht River, Middle Creek, and Salmonberry Creek. Downstream from the South Fork confluence the main stem Pysht River flows mainly east and slightly north to the small settlement of Pysht near the coast. The river makes a large bend north, then east, then south, then east before emptying into the Strait of Juan de Fuca. Two additional tributaries, Reed Creek and Indian Creek, join in the last reach. The mouth of the Pysht River is just south of a headland called Pillar Point and just north of the Pillar Point Recreation Area and campground. The mouth of the Pysht is a tidally influenced estuary and supports a large complex of forested and tidal emergent wetlands.

== Biology ==
Because the Pysht River, like the Hoko River, is brushy, full of snags, and often carries tannin stained water, it is known as a "cedar creek". The river supports nine species of freshwater fish, five salmonid and four non-salmonid. The non-salmonids known to be found in the Pysht River include Pacific lamprey (Lampetra tridentata), three-spined stickleback (Gasterosteus aculeatus), and two freshwater sculpin species: coastrange sculpin (Cottus aleuticus) and prickly sculpin (Cottus asper). Salmonid species include chinook salmon (Oncorhynchus tshawytscha), coho salmon (Oncorhynchus kisutch), chum salmon (Oncorhynchus keta), sea-run coastal cutthroat trout (Oncorhynchus clarki clarki), and steelhead (Oncorhynchus mykiss irideus). Other fish species are likely to be present in the river's estuary, but which have not been formally sampled, include starry flounder, surf perches, and smelts.

Historically the anadromous salmonid fish runs were robust but all have declined, especially the main stem-dependent chinook and chum salmon. Chinook salmon may no longer be viable in the Pysht watershed and the few that are still seen may be strays from nearby populations such as the Hoko River stock. The causes of habitat degradation are thought to have resulted from logging, highway and railroad construction, log transport, and channelization. Other causes of population decline include fishing and disease caused by hatchery supplementation of salmonides. The large estuary is an important salmon rearing habitat. It has recovered somewhat from past heavy impacts, but active restoration efforts may be required to prevent further population declines.

Before commercial logging, the forests of the lower Pysht River watershed featured large-diameter stands of Sitka spruce (Picea sitchensis), Douglas-fir (Pseudotsuga menziesii), western hemlock (Tsuga heterophylla), and western red cedar (Thuja plicata). Deciduous trees such as red alder (Alnus rubra) and big-leaf maple (Acer macrophyllum) were present to a lesser degree. Today nearly the entire basin is industrial forest and subject to repeated logging. Most trees are less than thirty years old.

== River modifications ==
The Pysht River, its floodplain, and its aquatic habitat has been altered in various ways including road and railroad grade construction, road maintenance and protection (such as riprap), channelization, channel relocation, logging, in-channel wood removal, dredging, homesteading, agricultural development, wetland filling, and rural development.

Logging began in the early 20th century and eliminated the original old-growth forests. The Pysht River was channelized to facilitate the transport of logs along the lower river and estuary. Dredging was routinely carried out on the lower river and the dredge spoils were reportedly dumped into the estuary's tidal wetlands for the purpose of agricultural development. A network of logging railroads were built adjacent to the main stem Pysht and the South Fork Pysht. A wagon road that paralleled the Pysht River was converted into a paved state highway Washington State Route 112 in the 1940s.

== See also ==
- List of rivers of Washington (state)
