= Tongue Point (Clallam County, Washington) =

Coordinates: 48.1665°N 123.7062°W

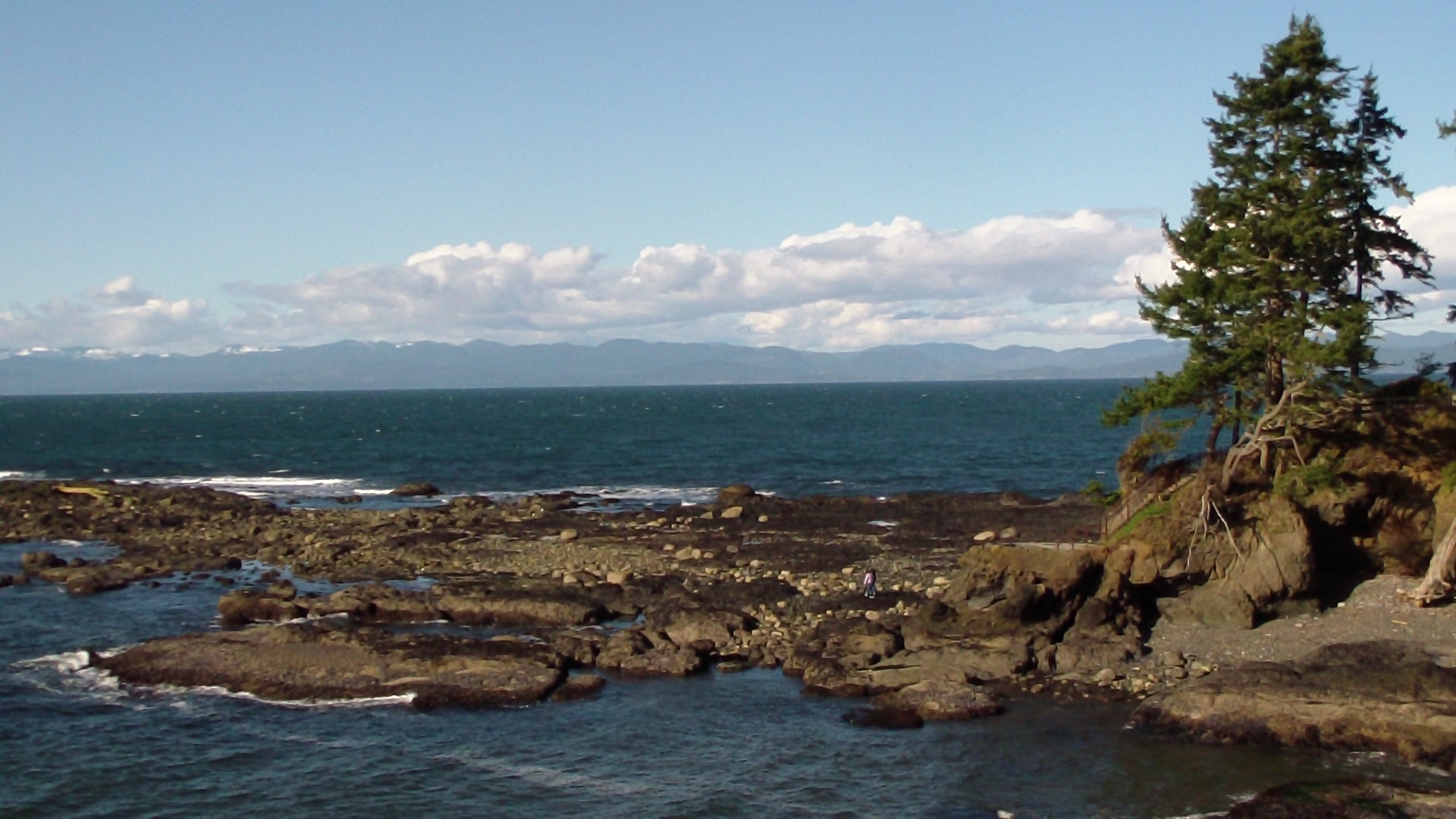
Tongue Point

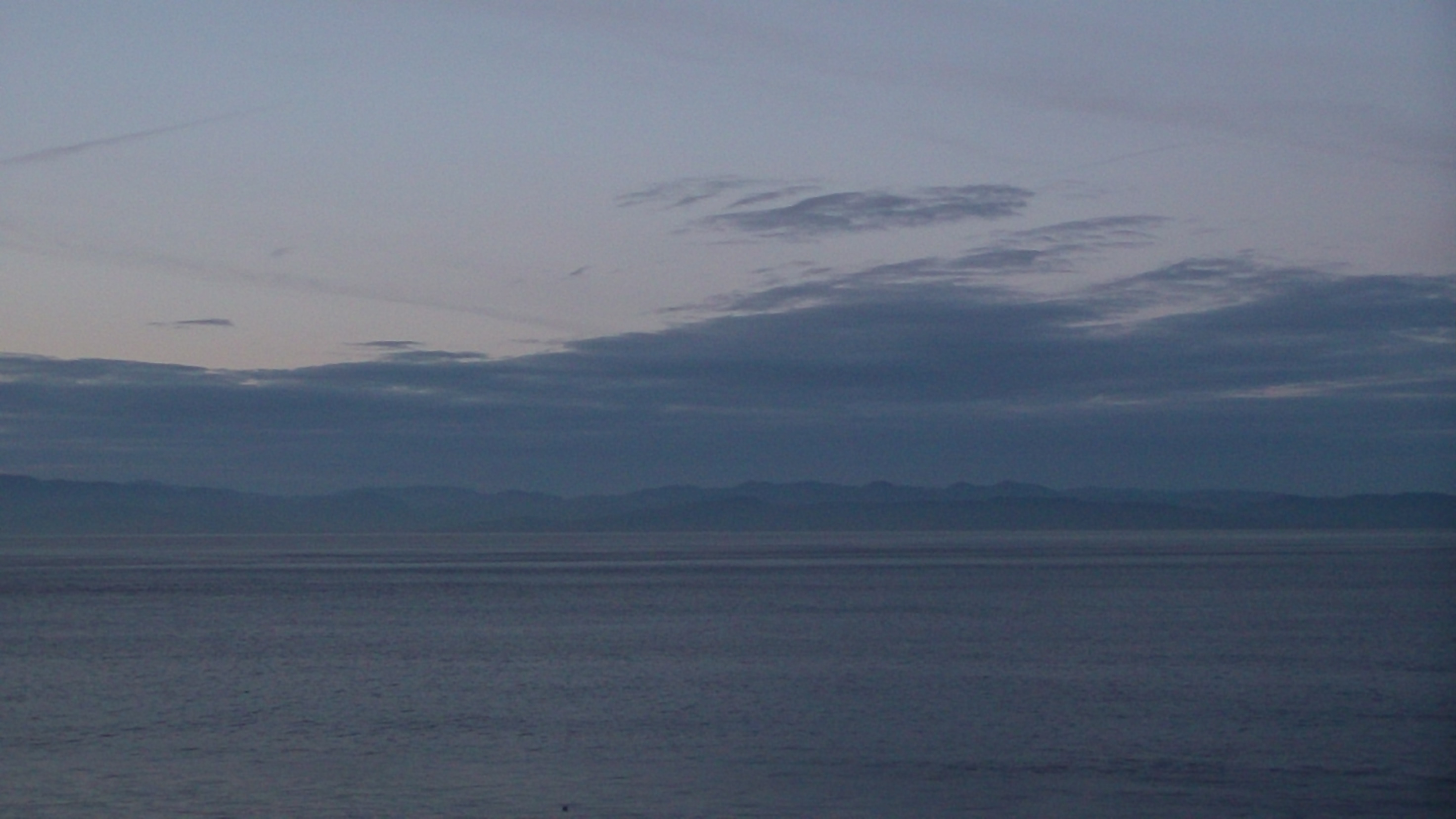
Seen from Tongue Point

Tongue Point is an area of the Salt Creek Recreation Area, in Washington, United States. The point is a rock out cropping that extends into the Strait of Juan de Fuca. This outcropping is visible during low tide. At low tide it is accessible on foot. One can observe many species of marine life, such as, mussels, clams, sea stars, and kelp. This area is popular with SCUBA divers. Also in the general vicinity, there is a natural arch that can be walked through.
