= Edis =

Edis, EDIS or Ediz may also refer to:

- Edis Görgülü, British-born Turkish singer
- Edis (name)
- Electronic Distributorless Ignition System
  - Ford EDIS
- European Defence Industrial Strategy
- Emergency Disaster Information Service, a global natural disaster tracking service in Hungary
- Emergency Digital Information Service, a public information system run by the State of California
- Emily Dickinson International Society, society to study the American poet
- Environmental Data and Information Service
- European Deposit Insurance Scheme, proposed part of the Economic and Monetary Union of the European Union

== Ediz ==
=== Given name ===
- Ediz Bahtiyaroğlu (1986–2012), Turkish footballer
- Ediz Gürel (born 2008), Turkish chess player
- Ediz Hun (born 1940), Turkish film actor and politician
- Ediz Yıldırımer (born 1993), Turkish swimmer

=== Surname ===
- Ece Asude Ediz (born 2002), Turkish female boxer

=== Others ===
- Ediz Hook, a sand split in Wafington, United States
- Ediz Hook Light, a former lighthouse in Washington, United States

== See also ==
- Edisa, a settlement in South Ossetia, Georgia
