= USCGC Adelie =

United States Coast Guard patrol boat

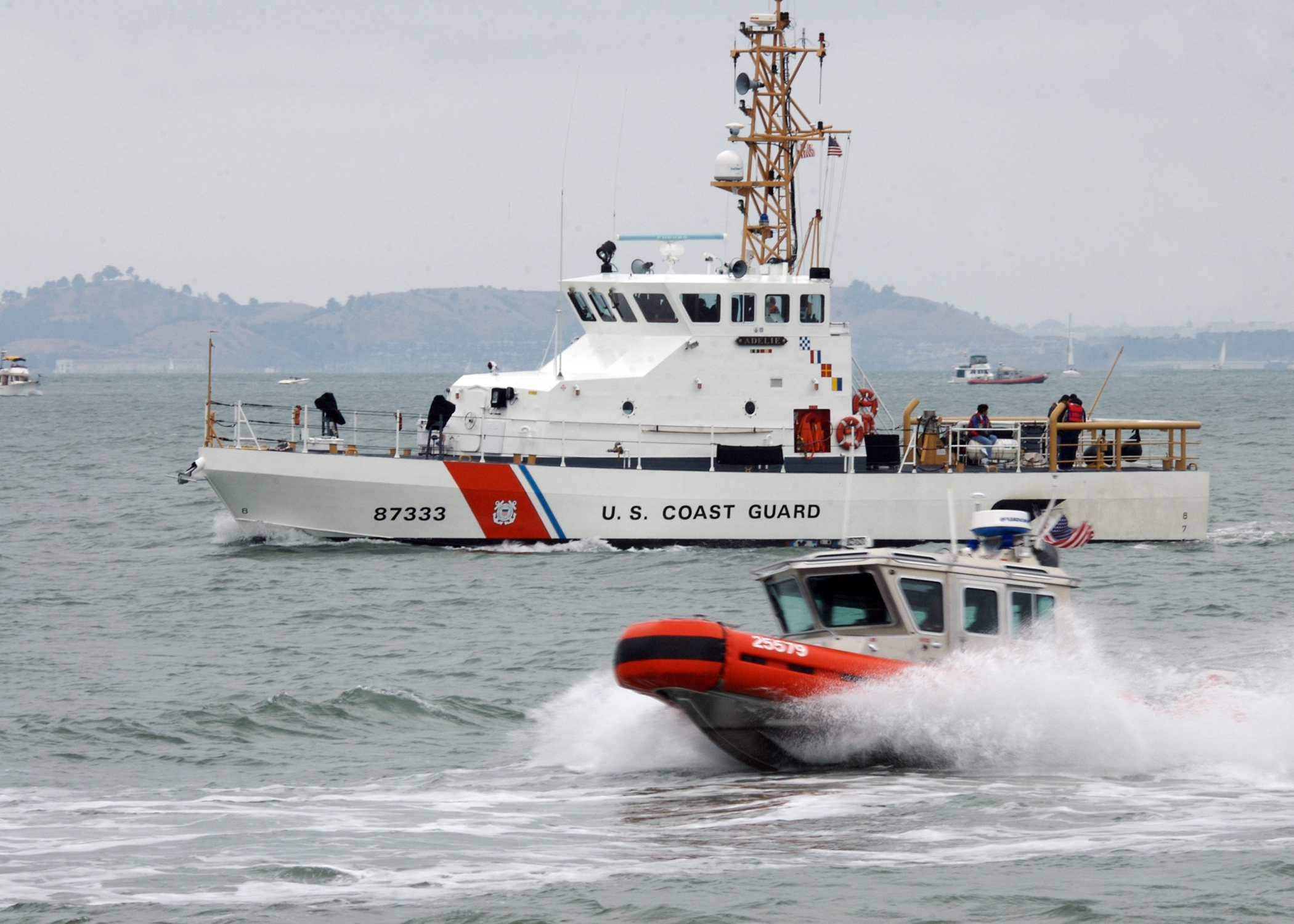
- Adelie in San Francisco Bay

History

United States
- Name: Adelie
- Namesake: Adélie penguin
- Operator: United States Coast Guard
- Builder: Bollinger Shipyards, Lockport, Louisiana
- Commissioned: August 17, 2001
- Home port: Port Angeles, Washington
- Identification: Hull number: WPB-87333
- Status: In active service
- Badge

General characteristics
- Class & type: Marine Protector-class patrol boat
- Length: 87 ft (27 m)

USCGC Adelie (WPB-87333) is an 87-foot (27 m) Marine Protector-class patrol boat of the United States Coast Guard, based at Port Angeles, Washington. Commissioned in August 2001, it operates in the Strait of Juan de Fuca, the San Juan Islands and Puget Sound, where its work includes search and rescue and law enforcement. The cutter has also deployed to Southern California, where in 2015 it seized 2,900 pounds of marijuana off Point Loma.

== Design ==
Adelie was built by Bollinger Shipyards of Lockport, Louisiana. It was the 33rd boat of the Marine Protector class, which Bollinger built for the Coast Guard under a contract first awarded on March 13, 1996. The class replaced the older 82-foot Point-class cutters.

== Service history ==
=== Arrival in Port Angeles ===
Adelie arrived at the Coast Guard base on Ediz Hook in Port Angeles, Washington in July 2001. It was the first of two new 87-foot patrol boats assigned to Port Angeles and the second high-speed patrol boat on the North Olympic Peninsula, after the cutter Osprey at Port Townsend. The Coast Guard's Thirteenth District commissioned the cutter at the Ediz Hook station on August 17, 2001. Its sister boat Wahoo later joined it at Port Angeles, and the two cutters shared the station's pier.

=== Search and rescue ===
In one case in the eastern Strait of Juan de Fuca, a rescue team from Adelie stopped the flooding aboard the 57-foot (17 m) fishing vessel Zealot, based in Ketchikan, Alaska, about 2 miles (3.2 km) south of Smith Island. The cutter then towed the boat, with its three crew members unhurt, to Port Townsend for repairs.

On May 3, 2024, Adelie's crew rescued a man and his dog after their small commercial fishing vessel sank west of Henry Island in the San Juan Islands.

=== Drug interdiction ===
On August 29, 2015, while deployed to Southern California, Adelie's crew boarded the 43-foot (13 m) sport-fishing boat Pasa Tiempo about 1 mile (1.6 km) south of Point Loma, near San Diego and found 168 bales holding about 2,900 pounds (1,300 kg) of marijuana. The two people aboard were taken into custody, and the cutter escorted the boat to San Diego.

=== Escorts and security ===
On October 9, 2024, Adelie escorted the Uruguayan Navy ship ROU Oyarvide through Puget Sound, passing Shilshole Bay in Seattle. In June 2026, during the 2026 FIFA World Cup, the Coast Guard stepped up patrols around Washington's ports, waterways and fan zones. Adelie and crews from Coast Guard Station Seattle patrolled Puget Sound and carried out recreational boating safety boardings.

== See also ==
- Coast Guard Air Station Port Angeles
- List of United States Coast Guard cutters
