= USCGC Osprey =

United States Coast Guard patrol boat

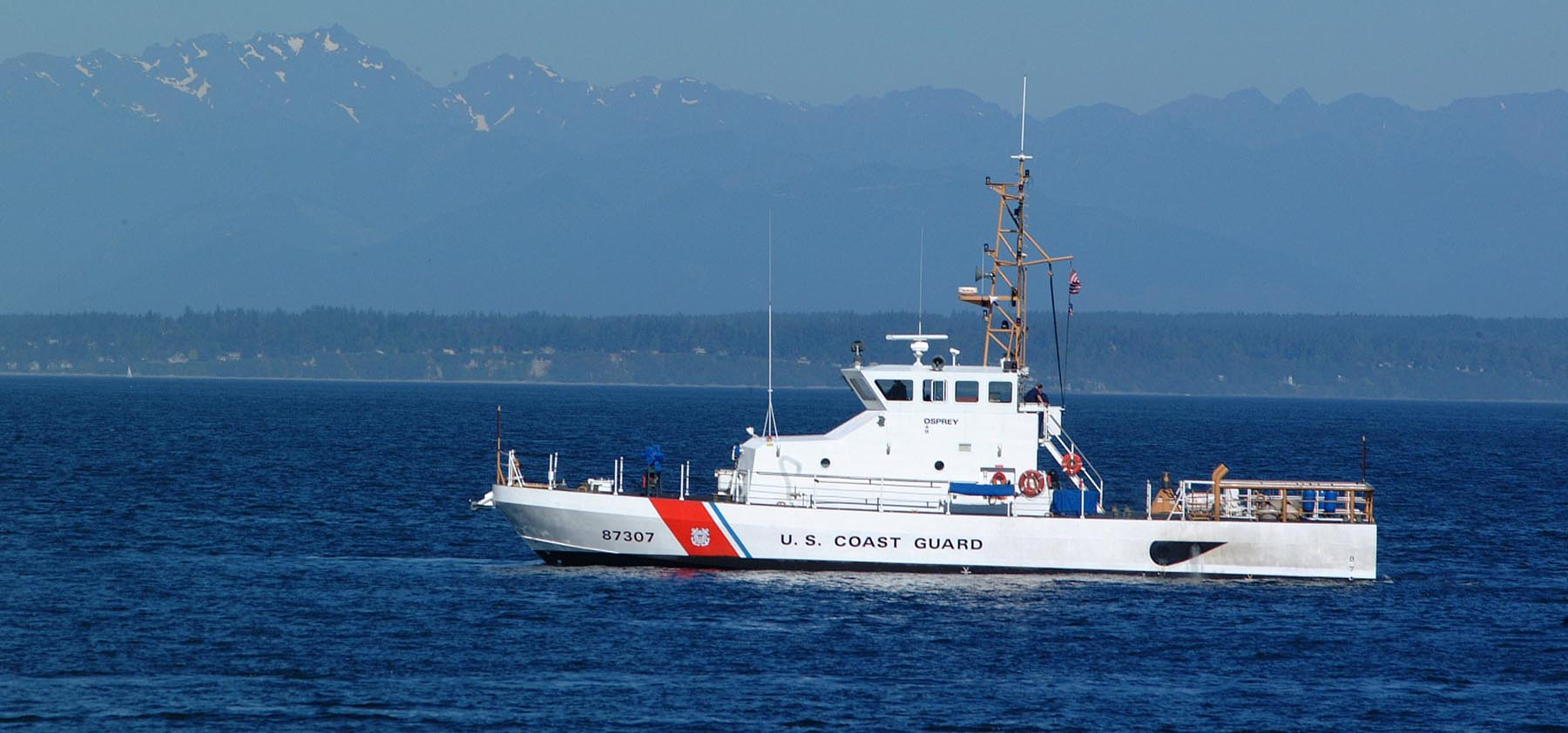
- Osprey on patrol in Puget Sound

History

United States
- Name: Osprey
- Namesake: Osprey
- Operator: United States Coast Guard
- Builder: Bollinger Shipyards, Lockport, Louisiana
- Completed: 1998
- Commissioned: June 19, 1999
- Home port: Port Townsend, Washington
- Identification: Hull number: WPB-87307
- Status: In active service

General characteristics
- Class & type: Marine Protector-class patrol boat
- Length: 87 ft (27 m)
- Complement: 10 (1999)

USCGC Osprey (WPB-87307) is an 87-foot (27 m) Marine Protector-class patrol boat of the United States Coast Guard, based at Port Townsend, Washington. Commissioned in June 1999, it was the seventh boat of its class and the first sent to the Coast Guard's Thirteenth District, now the Northwest District. Its crew patrols Puget Sound, the Salish Sea and the Strait of Juan de Fuca, carrying out law enforcement, search and rescue, marine environmental response and recreational boating safety missions. In 2001 Osprey took part in the seizure of the trawler Western Wind, which was carrying more than two tons of cocaine near the mouth of the strait.

== Design ==
Osprey was built in 1998 by Bollinger Shipyards of Lockport, Louisiana. Bollinger built the Marine Protector class under a contract first awarded on March 13, 1996. The class replaced the older 82-foot Point-class cutters. Like the rest of the class, Osprey launches and recovers an aluminum-hulled boat, powered by an inboard diesel engine driving a waterjet, from a ramp at its stern. When it was commissioned, the cutter had a crew of ten.

== Service history ==
=== Commissioning ===
The Thirteenth Coast Guard District (now U.S. Coast Guard Northwest District) commissioned Osprey on June 19, 1999, at Union Wharf in Port Townsend. It was the seventh boat built in the Marine Protector class and the first of the new class to arrive in the Pacific Northwest. Later that summer it patrolled Lake Washington during Seattle's Seafair celebration. When the cutter Adelie arrived at Port Angeles in 2001, it joined Osprey as the second high-speed patrol boat on the North Olympic Peninsula.

=== Western Wind cocaine seizure ===
On February 21, 2001, Coast Guard boarding crews found cocaine hidden in a secret hold of the trawler Western Wind near the mouth of the Strait of Juan de Fuca. Osprey was part of the interdiction task force, along with U.S. Customs agents, three cutters and a helicopter from Port Angeles. The Peninsula Daily News called it the biggest cocaine seizure in the Pacific Northwest at approximately 5,538 pounds (2,512 kg). Rear Admiral Erroll M. Brown later honored the Osprey crew and presented them with a commemorative "snowflake" decal for the cutter.

=== Puget Sound operations ===
During Seafair in 2009, Osprey enforced a security zone around the Coast Guard's new national security cutter Bertholf in the annual Parade of Ships in Seattle. That year the Port of Port Townsend began plans for a new Coast Guard station in its Boat Haven marina. The building the Coast Guard had leased for the Osprey crew on Benedict Spit was moved in 2010 to make room for it, and the crew moved to temporary offices in the port's industrial park. The cutter has also been opened to the public for tours in Port Townsend.

In March 2023 Osprey operated near Neah Bay at the entrance to the strait, where its crew practiced hoists with an MH-65 Dolphin helicopter. On March 10, 2023, it trained with the Canadian frigate HMCS Winnipeg off Victoria, British Columbia.

=== International exercises ===
On May 21, 2026, Osprey joined a search and rescue exercise in the Strait of Juan de Fuca near Victoria with the Japan Coast Guard patrol vessel Itsukushima and the Canadian Coast Guard. The U.S. units also included a 45-foot (14 m) Response Boat – Medium and an MH-65 helicopter from Air Station Port Angeles.

== See also ==
- List of United States Coast Guard cutters
