= Ediz Hook Light =

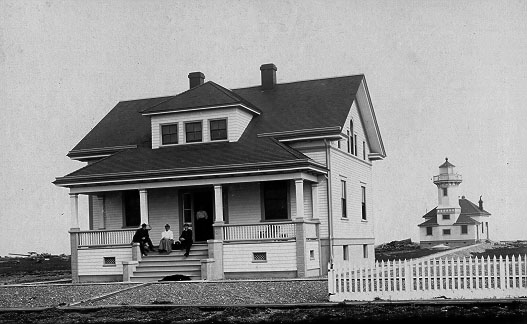
- Keeper's house (foreground) and 1908 Ediz Hook Lighthouse (background) (USCG)
- Location: Port Angeles, Washington
- Coordinates: 48.11275°N 123.4266°W (current location of moved 1908 building)

Tower
- Constructed: 1865
- Construction: Wood
- Shape: Square

Light
- First lit: 1865
- Deactivated: 1908 (first structure); 1946 (second structure)
- Lens: Fifth order fresnel lens

Ediz Hook Lighthouse was a lighthouse in Port Angeles, Washington, United States. Originally constructed in 1865, the lighthouse structure was later replaced in 1908 by a new structure, and finally in 1946 by an automated beacon on the United States Coast Guard air station on the end of Ediz Hook.

== History ==
Ediz Hook is a three-mile-long sand spit that juts north and east into the Strait of Juan de Fuca and forms the natural harbor at Port Angeles. Private operators built navigational warning fires on the spit as early as 1861.

The first Ediz Hook lighthouse was built near the tip of the spit in 1865. It was a two-story, schoolhouse-type building with a lighthouse tower arising at one end of its gabled roof. Its first keeper was George Smith, the father of Port Angeles's prime promoter, Victor Smith. In 1908, a second Ediz Hook lighthouse was constructed near the first lighthouse, with the two buildings existing in close proximity to each other. The new lighthouse used the same Carl W. Leick design employed at Oregon's Cape Arago Light.

After taking over the spit for the Coast Guard Air Station Port Angeles, the Coast Guard deactivated the lighthouse in 1946 and replaced it with a skeletal communications tower. The site's original lighthouse was demolished in 1939. The light tower of the 1908 keeper's house was removed when the structure was relocated to Fourth and Albert streets in Port Angeles where it has been a private residence since 1946.
