= Robin Alexis =

American radio and reality television personality and author

- Born: March 31, 1955 (age 71); New Hampshire, USA
- Education: Plymouth State University
- Occupations: Radio personality, metaphysical personality, author
- Website: Official website

Robin Alexis (born March 31, 1955, New Hampshire) is an American radio and reality television personality, author, Reiki practitioner, and psychic from the state of Washington. Her live call-in show Mystic Radio with Robin Alexis has been broadcast weekly since 2005, and as of 2023 it is broadcast from KKNW in the Seattle market. She appeared on Jimmy Kimmel Live in 2003.

== Claims ==
Alexis gained note from press in the United States and from Merseyside Skeptics Society in the United Kingdom when she announced in 2010 that her metaphysical mothering included counseling a couple on hosting the reincarnation of Michael Jackson. She received a trademark on the term "metaphysical mothering" in 2011.

Alexis appeared on the television program The Real L Word as a metaphysical mother, which she describes as "speak[ing] to the souls of babies who haven't been conceived yet, who are in the womb, or are newborns...supporting parent's [sic] relationships with their yet unborn, lost, and aborted children".

== Personal life ==
Alexis is married to Bob Bordonaro and has two children. She is an alumna of Plymouth State University in New Hampshire.

== Bibliography ==
- Alexis, Robin (2008), Robin's Song, Author Solutions Incorporated, ISBN 9781434373564
