= Ford EDIS =

The Ford EDIS or Electronic Distributorless Ignition System is a computer-controlled ignition system developed by Ford that uses an ignition coil for each pair of cylinders (wasted spark). All the coils are placed in a single module called a coilpack.

== Vehicles with EDIS ==
Ford used the EDIS module on a number of vehicles from 1988 to 199X.

== EDIS-4 ==
The EDIS-4 module is used on the following vehicles equipped with the Ford HCS engine, and the 1.9-liter straight-4 Ford CVH engine, between 1988 and 1993:

- Ford Escort / Mercury Tracer
- Ford Fiesta (Europe)
- Ford Escort (Europe)
- Ford Sierra (Europe)
- Ford Scorpio (Europe)
- Ford Mondeo (Europe)

This system was also used on the 1995–2001 4-cylinder Ford Rangers and 1995–2001 Mazda B2300, B2500. But was incorporated into the EEC-V ECU, so there is no external module.

== EDIS-6 ==
The EDIS-6 module is used on the following vehicles equipped with the 4.0L Ford Cologne V6 engine and 3.8L Ford Essex V6 engine between 1990 and 1997:

- Ford Ranger / Mazda B-Series
- Ford Explorer / Mazda Navajo
- Ford Aerostar
- Ford Mustang (3.8L V6)
- Ford Thunderbird Supercoupe
- Ford Taurus SHO V6 (1989–1995)
- Ford Windstar
- Ford Mondeo

The European Ford Scorpio 2.9 V6 24V Cosworth also uses the EDIS-6 module.

== EDIS-8 ==
The EDIS-8 module is used on the following vehicles equipped with the 4.6-liter V-8 Ford Modular engine between 1990 and 1997:

- Lincoln Town Car, Mark VIII
- Ford Crown Victoria / Mercury Grand Marquis
- Ford Thunderbird / Mercury Cougar
- Ford Mustang

The EDIS-8 Module was also used in Some later 5.0L Ford Explorers until around 2002

== Aftermarket use in non-Ford vehicles ==
The EDIS system's relative simplicity, in particular the fact it does not require a cam sensor, makes it a popular choice for custom car builders and classic car owners looking to retrofit a modern ignition system to their vehicle. The crankshaft-mounted trigger wheel, VR sensor, EDIS Module and an ignition control computer can all be easily fitted to most older engines that originally used a traditional distributor for ignition.

== See also ==
- Profile ignition pickup
