= Emergency Digital Information Service =

Emergency information system in California

Emergency Digital Information Service (EDIS) is a wireless datacast based emergency and disaster information service operated by the State of California Governor's Office of Emergency Services. In operation since 1990, the system was upgraded in 1999 to support image and sound capabilities via satellite broadcast. The system is an enhancement to the Emergency Alert System. Like the EAS, it is used for statewide and local emergencies such as severe weather warnings, AMBER Alerts, and civil emergencies. The EDIS system is compatible with CAP and IPAWS. It is also known as the Emergency News Network in Los Angeles.

EDIS uses two frequencies for reception: 37.0200 MHz and 37.3800 MHz

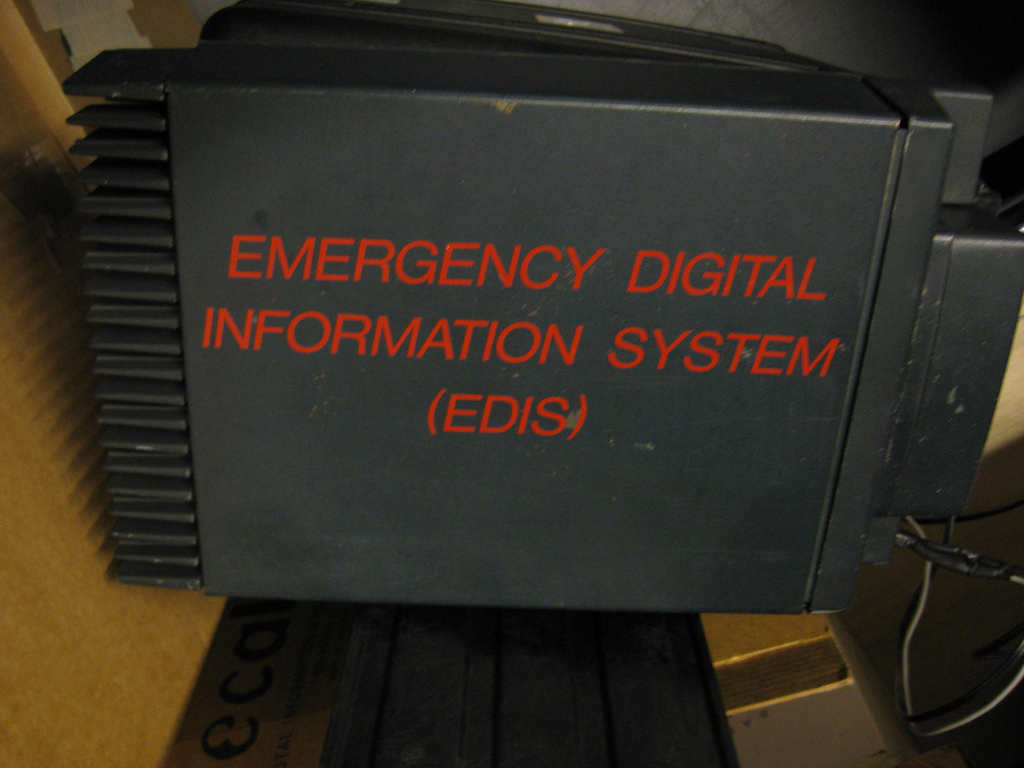
Motorola MOCOM 70 EDIS Radio (top)

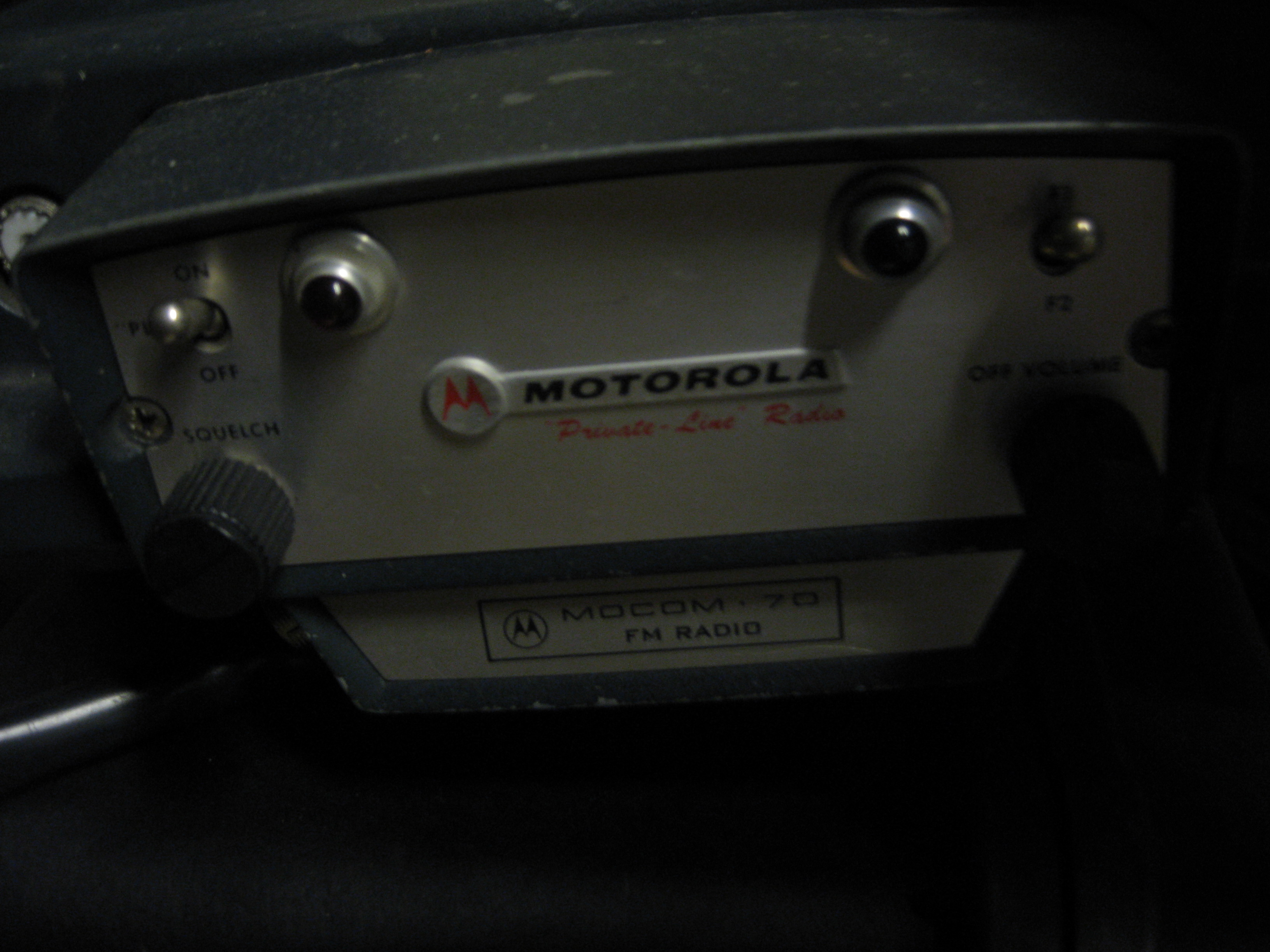
Motorola MOCOM 70 EDIS Radio (front)
