= Port Angeles, Washington =

City in Washington, United States

- City
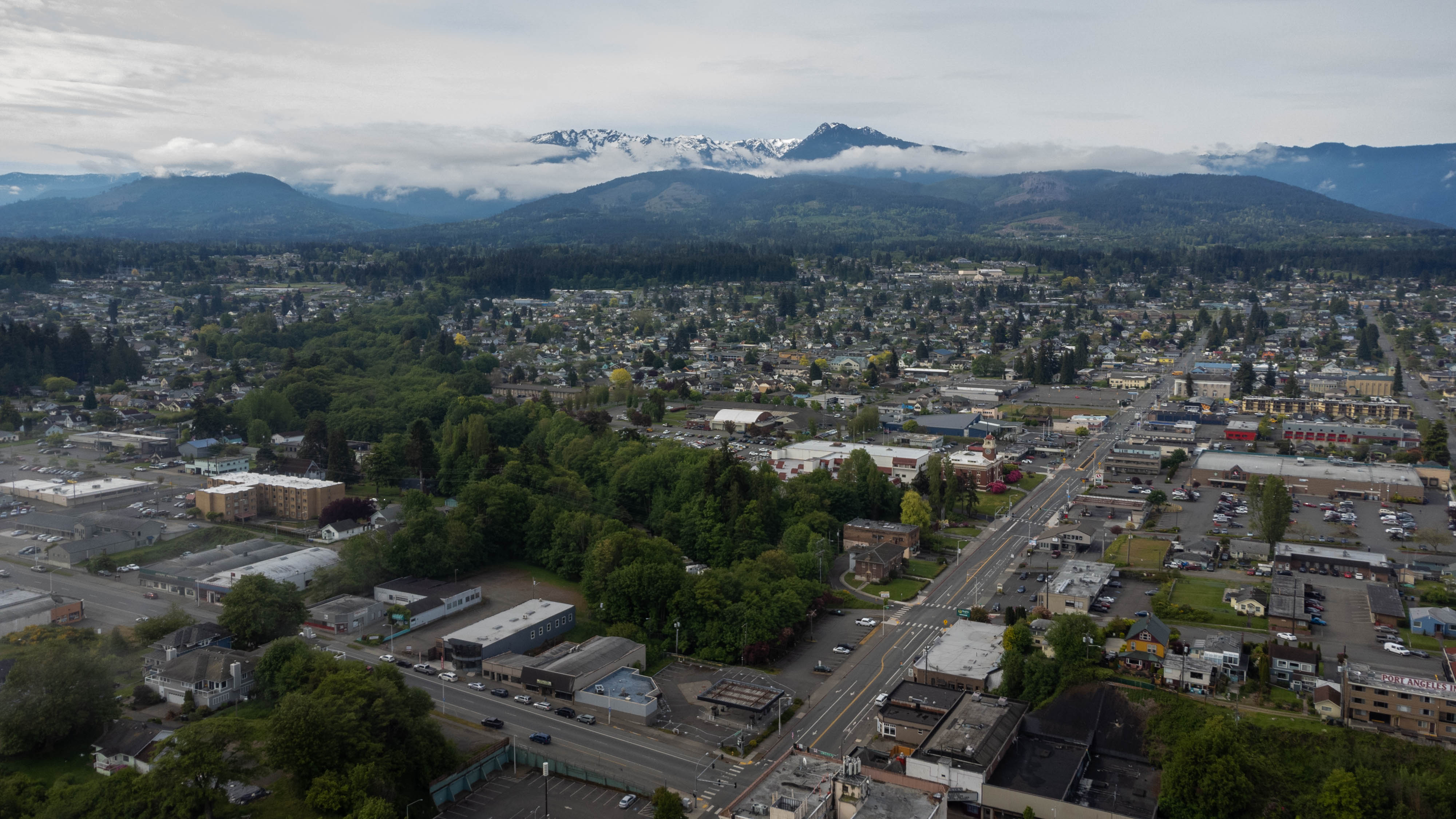
- Aerial view of downtown Port Angeles, looking towards the Olympic Mountains
- Motto: Where the mountains meet the sea.
- Interactive location map of Port Angeles
- Coordinates: 48°07′35″N 123°28′40″W
- Country: United States
- State: Washington
- County: Clallam
- Founded: 1791
- Incorporated: June 11, 1890

Government
  - Type: Council–manager
  - Mayor: Kate Dexter

Area
  - City: 14.53 sq mi (37.63 km^{2})
  - Land: 10.71 sq mi (27.74 km^{2})
  - Water: 3.82 sq mi (9.89 km^{2})
- Elevation: 141 ft (43 m)

Population (2020)
  - City: 19,960
  - Estimate (2024): 20,112
  - Density: 1,876.7/sq mi (724.61/km^{2})
  - Urban: 24,445
  - Metro: 77,616 (US: 79th)
- Time zone: UTC−8 (Pacific (PST))
  - Summer (DST): UTC−7 (PDT)
- ZIP Codes: 98362, 98363
- Area codes: 360 and 564
- FIPS code: 53-55365
- GNIS feature ID: 2411459
- Website: cityofpa.us

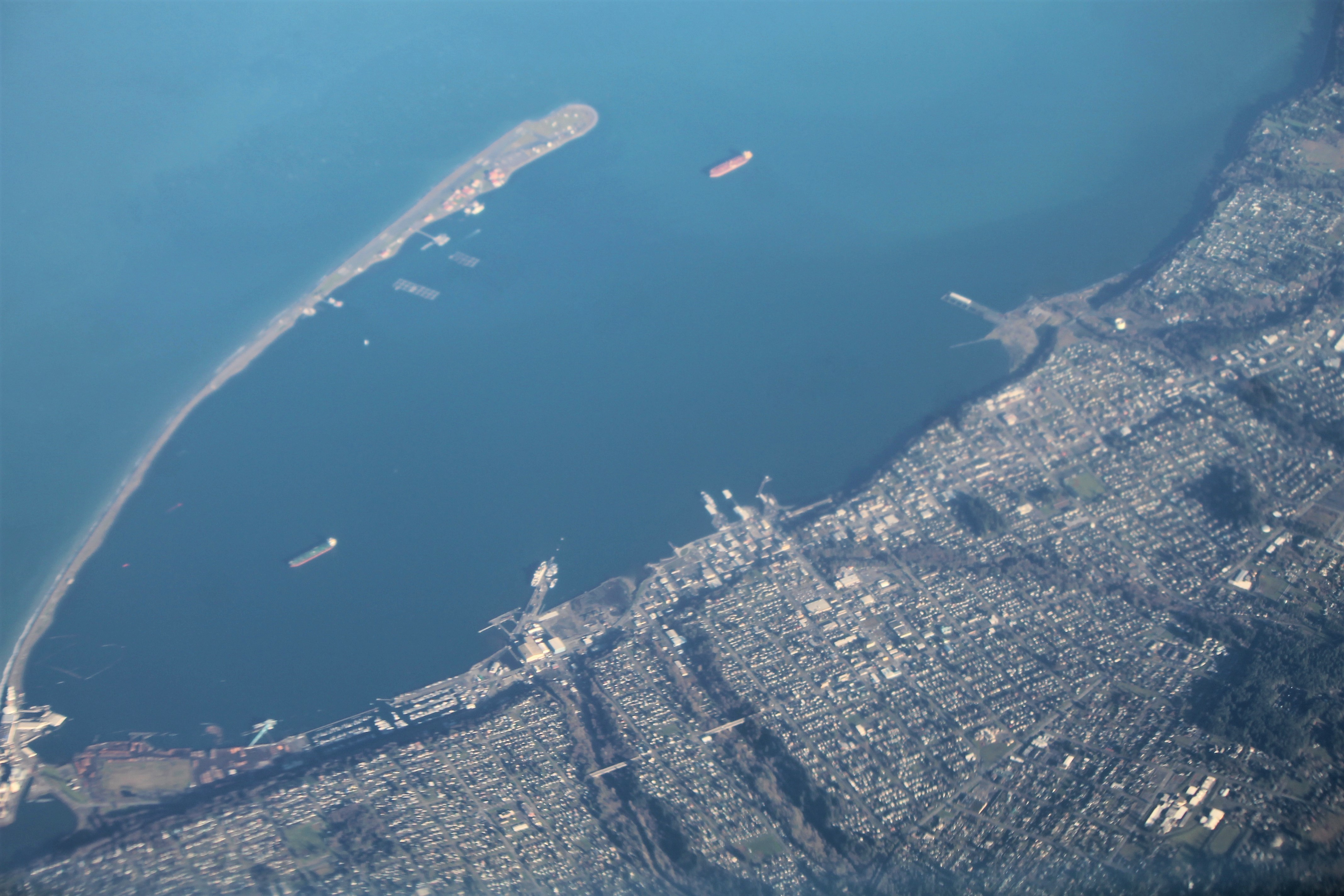
Aerial view of Port Angeles

Port Angeles (/ˈændʒələs/ AN-jəl-əs) is a city in and the county seat of Clallam County, Washington, United States. The population was 19,960 at the 2020 census, it is the most populous city in the county, as well as the most populous city on the Olympic Peninsula. The population was estimated at 20,112 in 2024.

The city's harbor was dubbed Puerto de Nuestra Señora de los Ángeles (Port of Our Lady of the Angels) by Spanish explorer Francisco de Eliza in 1791. By the mid-19th century, after settlement by English speakers from the United States, the name was shortened and partially anglicized to its current form, Port Angeles Harbor.

Port Angeles is home to Peninsula College. It is the birthplace of football hall of famer John Elway and residents include writers and other celebrities. The city is served by William R. Fairchild International Airport. Ferry service is provided across the Strait of Juan de Fuca to Victoria, British Columbia, Canada on the MV Coho.

== History ==
This area was long occupied by succeeding cultures of indigenous peoples. In 1791, the harbor was entered by Spanish explorer Francisco de Eliza, who named it Puerto de Nuestra Señora de los Ángeles (Port of Our Lady of the Angels), claiming it for Spain. He was on an expedition from southern California. This name was shortened to the current one of Port Angeles.

It was not until the 19th century that European Americans began to settle here. A small whaling, fishing and shipping village developed, which traded with Victoria, British Columbia. In 1856–57, the first settlers arrived and were followed by the Cherbourg Land Company in 1859.

Soon afterwards the site caught the attention of Victor Smith. Smith, a protege of Salmon Chase, was Collector of Customs for the Puget Sound District. He quickly gained approval to relocate the U.S. Customs port of entry for Washington Territory from Port Townsend to Port Angeles. With Chase's support, he also succeeded in getting President Abraham Lincoln to designate 3,520 acres (1,424 ha) at Port Angeles as a federal reserve for lighthouse, military and naval purposes. The U.S. Army Corps of Engineers platted a federal town site on the reserve land, laying out the street plan which still exists today. The fact that Washington, D.C., was the only other city officially laid out by the federal government led the U.S. Board of Trade in 1890 to dub Port Angeles the "Second National City." Settlers soon followed slowly, but Smith's death in the sinking of the Brother Jonathan led to the loss of interest in the area. The Port of Entry was returned to Port Townsend and the area sank into obscurity until the 1880s.

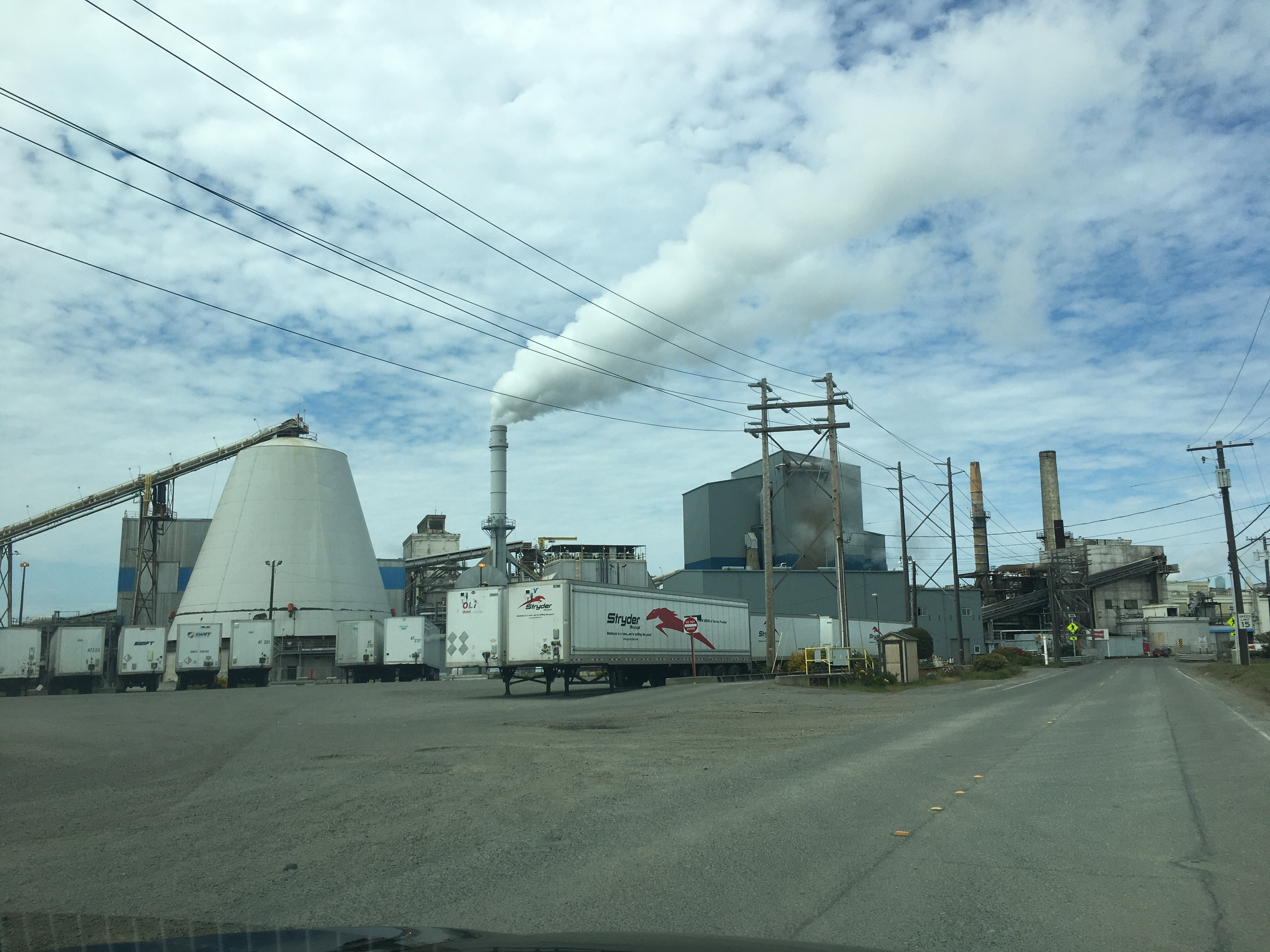
The McKinley Paper Company plant in Port Angeles

In 1884, a hotel was built and the trading post was expanded into the area's first general store. A wharf was soon built upon the site where the current ferry pier stands. A village of 300 in 1886, Port Angeles' population grew to 3,000 by 1890. Hundreds of its new residents were part of the Puget Sound Cooperative Colony, which was established in 1887 and built several of the settlement's first permanent civic facilities, including a sawmill, church, office building, and opera house. The town was incorporated on June 11, 1890, and was named the county seat of Clallam County later that year. A depression a few years later was weathered and the town continued to grow into the new century. In 1914, large-scale logging began with construction of a large mill and a railway connecting the hinterlands to the mill. Other mills were soon built and the lumber and pulp mills supported the economy of the area until well into the century.

Tourism became increasingly important as the growing national affluence, and especially the 1961 opening of the Hood Canal Bridge that cut driving time from the populated central Puget Sound region, brought more visitors drawn by the mountains, rivers, and rainforest of Olympic National Park and by fishing and boating along the Strait of Juan de Fuca. The mills began to close in the 1970s and 1980s until only one pulp mill remained in operation; the Rayonier specialty pulp mill was shuttered in 1997.

In August 2003, a $275 million construction project known as the Graving Dock Project was started in Port Angeles near the water as part of the Hood Canal Bridge east-half replacement project. It was intended to construct an area for anchoring pontoons for the bridge. During construction, human remains and artifacts were discovered. This site was found to be the "largest prehistoric Indian village and burial ground found in the United States," according to a senior archaeologist for the U.S. Army Corps of Engineers in Seattle. The archeology site also included Native American burials of the late 18th and early 19th centuries.

Archeologists were called in to conduct a professional excavation. They found about 300 graves and 785 pieces of human bones, in addition to numerous ritual and ceremonial Indian artifacts of the former Tse-whit-zen village of the federally recognized Lower Elwha Klallam Tribe. This site had appeared to have been continuously occupied for thousands of years; some of the remains date back at least 8,000 years. Because of the significance of the site for Native American history, in December 2004, the graving dock project was abandoned.

Many of the graves uncovered appeared to hold entire families, who seemed to have died suddenly. Archeologists speculate that this could have been the result of pandemics of smallpox and other infectious illnesses. These caused massive death tolls among Native American populations in 1780 and 1835, as they had no acquired immunity. Infectious diseases contracted from interactions with European fur traders are believed to have killed about 90 percent of the people living in the Northwest before European American settlement of the area.

In 2016, Port Angeles installed two street signs in English and Klallam to revitalize and preserve the area's Klallam culture.

== Geography ==
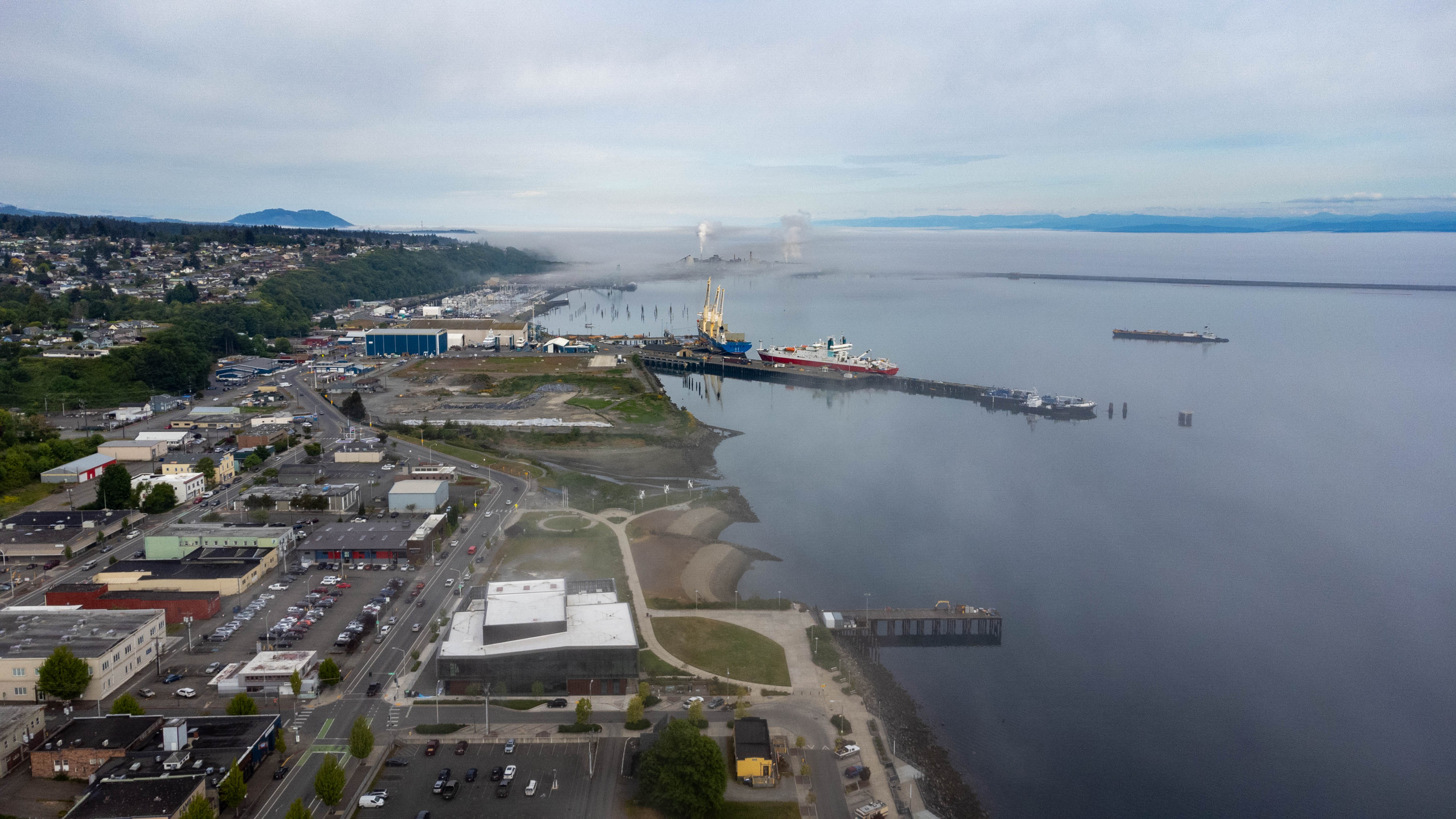
Aerial view of the Port of Port Angeles, located west of downtown

According to the United States Census Bureau, the city has a total area of 14.530 square miles (37.63 km^{2}), of which 10.711 square miles (27.74 km^{2}) is land and 3.819 square miles (9.89 km^{2}) is water.

The city is situated on the northern edge of the Olympic Peninsula along the shore of the Strait of Juan de Fuca. Port Angeles features a long and narrow glacial moraine named Ediz Hook that projects northeasterly nearly three miles into the Strait. Ediz Hook creates a large, natural deep-water harbor shielded from the storms and swells that move predominantly eastward down the Strait from the Pacific Ocean. Coast Guard Air Station / Sector Field Office (SFO) Port Angeles is situated on the end of Ediz Hook. The harbor is deep enough to provide anchorage for large ocean-going ships such as tankers and cruise ships. The south shore of Vancouver Island and the city of Victoria, British Columbia are visible across the Strait to the north.

Port Angeles is located in the rain shadow of the Olympic Mountains, which means the city gets significantly less rain than other areas of western Washington. The average annual precipitation total is approximately 25 in (640 mm), compared to Seattle's 38 in (970 mm) or Forks' 100 in (2,500 mm). Temperatures are moderated by the maritime location, with winter lows rarely below 25 °F (−4 °C) and summer highs rarely above 80 °F (27 °C). However, in the winter, the city can be vulnerable to windstorms and Arctic cold fronts that sweep across the Strait of Juan de Fuca. Port Angeles receives about 4 in (10 cm) of snow each year, but it rarely stays on the ground for long.

Port Angeles is also the location of the headquarters of Olympic National Park, which encompasses most of the Olympic Mountains. This park was established by President Franklin D. Roosevelt in 1938, during the Great Depression.

=== Climate ===
Port Angeles has a warm summer mediterranean climate (Köppen Csb). It is heavily moderated by the Pacific Ocean, resulting in cool summers and mild winters for its latitude. Summers are far cooler than those of nearby Seattle. On June 27, 2021, Port Angeles set a new all-time record high of 97 °F (36 °C), breaking the city's previous all-time record high of 96 °F (36 °C). Port Angeles is in the rain shadow of the Olympic Mountains, resulting in much lower precipitation (only 26.54 in [674 mm] per year) than locations to the west outside of the rain shadow.

Climate data for Port Angeles, Washington (William R. Fairchild International Airport), 1991–2020 normals, extremes 1998–present
Month	Jan	Feb	Mar	Apr	May	Jun	Jul	Aug	Sep	Oct	Nov	Dec	Year
Record high °F (°C)	69 (21)	69 (21)	68 (20)	77 (25)	86 (30)	97 (36)	94 (34)	94 (34)	88 (31)	78 (26)	67 (19)	60 (16)	97 (36)
Mean maximum °F (°C)	56.2 (13.4)	54.4 (12.4)	58.8 (14.9)	66.5 (19.2)	73.4 (23.0)	81.2 (27.3)	82.8 (28.2)	84.8 (29.3)	78.7 (25.9)	66.8 (19.3)	59.0 (15.0)	54.4 (12.4)	87.3 (30.7)
Mean daily maximum °F (°C)	45.3 (7.4)	46.6 (8.1)	49.8 (9.9)	54.2 (12.3)	59.5 (15.3)	63.4 (17.4)	68.2 (20.1)	69.7 (20.9)	66.1 (18.9)	56.7 (13.7)	49.4 (9.7)	44.8 (7.1)	56.1 (13.4)
Daily mean °F (°C)	39.2 (4.0)	39.8 (4.3)	42.4 (5.8)	46.5 (8.1)	51.5 (10.8)	55.4 (13.0)	59.7 (15.4)	60.4 (15.8)	56.6 (13.7)	49.2 (9.6)	42.7 (5.9)	39.1 (3.9)	48.5 (9.2)
Mean daily minimum °F (°C)	33.1 (0.6)	33.0 (0.6)	35.0 (1.7)	38.8 (3.8)	43.4 (6.3)	47.4 (8.6)	51.1 (10.6)	51.1 (10.6)	47.1 (8.4)	41.6 (5.3)	36.0 (2.2)	33.4 (0.8)	40.9 (5.0)
Mean minimum °F (°C)	23.3 (−4.8)	23.7 (−4.6)	27.5 (−2.5)	31.2 (−0.4)	35.5 (1.9)	40.8 (4.9)	45.4 (7.4)	45.1 (7.3)	39.8 (4.3)	31.9 (−0.1)	25.6 (−3.6)	22.7 (−5.2)	18.1 (−7.7)
Record low °F (°C)	12 (−11)	11 (−12)	18 (−8)	28 (−2)	31 (−1)	36 (2)	41 (5)	42 (6)	33 (1)	22 (−6)	11 (−12)	13 (−11)	11 (−12)
Average precipitation inches (mm)	4.29 (109)	2.84 (72)	2.94 (75)	1.65 (42)	1.17 (30)	0.73 (19)	0.46 (12)	0.64 (16)	1.29 (33)	3.06 (78)	5.11 (130)	5.23 (133)	29.41 (749)
Average snowfall inches (cm)	0.0 (0.0)	0.0 (0.0)	0.0 (0.0)	0.0 (0.0)	0.0 (0.0)	0.0 (0.0)	0.0 (0.0)	0.0 (0.0)	0.0 (0.0)	0.0 (0.0)	0.0 (0.0)	0.4 (1.0)	0.4 (1)
Average precipitation days (≥ 0.01 in)	17.4	13.4	15.6	11.9	10.1	7.6	3.9	5.5	9.0	13.7	17.4	16.7	142.2
Average snowy days (≥ 0.1 in)	0.0	0.0	0.0	0.0	0.0	0.0	0.0	0.0	0.0	0.0	0.0	0.2	0.2
Average relative humidity (%)	88	87	86	83	79	79	75	76	80	83	86	88	83
Mean monthly sunshine hours	127.1	117.6	179.8	234	285.2	291	334.8	334.8	276	170.5	147	139.5	2,637.3
Mean daily sunshine hours	4.1	4.2	5.8	7.8	9.2	9.7	10.8	10.8	9.2	5.5	4.9	4.5	7.2
Mean daily daylight hours	8.9	10.3	12.0	13.7	15.2	16.0	15.6	14.2	12.5	10.8	9.2	8.4	12.2
Average ultraviolet index	2	2	2	3	3	4	4	4	3	3	2	2	3
Source 1: NOAA
Source 2: Weather Atlas (UV and humidity)

== Demographics ==
Historical population
Census	Pop.	Note	%±
1900	2,321		—
1910	2,286		−1.5%
1920	5,351		134.1%
1930	10,188		90.4%
1940	9,409		−7.6%
1950	11,233		19.4%
1960	12,653		12.6%
1970	16,367		29.4%
1980	17,311		5.8%
1990	17,710		2.3%
2000	18,397		3.9%
2010	19,038		3.5%
2020	19,960		4.8%
2024 (est.)	20,112		0.8%
U.S. Decennial Census; 2020 Census

As of the 2022 American Community Survey, there are 9,087 estimated households in Port Angeles with an average of 2.15 persons per household. The city has a median household income of $60,212. Approximately 11.0% of the city's population lives at or below the poverty line. Port Angeles has an estimated 55.2% employment rate, with 30.7% of the population holding a bachelor's degree or higher and 92.9% holding a high school diploma.

The top five reported ancestries (people were allowed to report up to two ancestries, thus the figures will generally add to more than 100%) were English (93.4%), Spanish (4.3%), Indo-European (1.1%), Asian and Pacific Islander (1.1%), and Other (0.1%).

The median age in the city was 41.3 years.

=== Racial and ethnic composition ===
Port Angeles, Washington – racial and ethnic composition Note: the US Census treats Hispanic/Latino as an ethnic category. This table excludes Latinos from the racial categories and assigns them to a separate category. Hispanics/Latinos may be of any race.
Race / ethnicity (NH = non-Hispanic)	Pop. 2000	Pop. 2010	Pop. 2020	% 2000	% 2010	% 2020
White alone (NH)	16,572	16,456	16,092	90.08%	86.44%	80.62%
Black or African American alone (NH)	123	153	155	0.67%	0.80%	0.78%
Native American or Alaska Native alone (NH)	562	578	595	3.05%	3.04%	2.98%
Asian alone (NH)	238	329	416	1.29%	1.73%	2.08%
Pacific Islander alone (NH)	32	30	39	0.17%	0.16%	0.20%
Other race alone (NH)	9	26	91	0.05%	0.14%	0.46%
Mixed race or multiracial (NH)	431	699	1,457	2.34%	3.67%	7.30%
Hispanic or Latino (any race)	430	767	1,115	2.34%	4.03%	5.59%
Total	18,397	19,038	19,960	100.00%	100.00%	100.00%

=== 2020 census ===
As of the 2020 census, there were 19,960 people, 8,883 households, and 4,955 families residing in the city, giving a population density of 1,863.5 inhabitants per square mile (719.5/km^{2}). There were 9,567 housing units at an average density of 893.2 per square mile (344.9/km^{2}).

The median age was 42.7 years; 19.0% of residents were under the age of 18 and 23.1% were 65 years of age or older. For every 100 females there were 96.2 males, and for every 100 females age 18 and over there were 94.0 males age 18 and over.

According to the decennial Demographic and Housing Characteristics data, 99.3% of residents lived in urban areas while 0.7% lived in rural areas.

There were 8,883 households in Port Angeles, of which 24.1% had children under the age of 18 living in them. Of all households, 38.3% were married-couple households, 21.8% were households with a male householder and no spouse or partner present, and 31.4% were households with a female householder and no spouse or partner present. About 36.0% of all households were made up of individuals and 17.7% had someone living alone who was 65 years of age or older.

There were 9,567 housing units, of which 7.1% were vacant. The homeowner vacancy rate was 1.0% and the rental vacancy rate was 5.4%.

Racial composition as of the 2020 census
Race	Number	Percent
White	16,512	82.7%
Black or African American	168	0.8%
American Indian and Alaska Native	660	3.3%
Asian	430	2.2%
Native Hawaiian and Other Pacific Islander	41	0.2%
Some other race	285	1.4%
Two or more races	1,864	9.3%
Hispanic or Latino (of any race)	1,115	5.6%

The ancestry of Port Angeles was 15.3% German, 15.1% English, 13.2% Irish, 5.5% Norwegian, 3.3% Italian, 3.2% French, 2.9% Scottish, 2.3% Polish, and 0.1% Sub-Saharan African.

The median household income was $53,690, with families having $65,994, married couples having $79,727, and non-families having $30,368. A total of 11.5% of the population were in poverty, with 13.4% of people under 18, 11.5% of people between the ages of 18 and 64, and 10% of people over 65 being in poverty.

=== 2010 census ===
As of the 2010 census, there were 19,038 people, 8,459 households, and 4,808 families residing in the city. The population density was 1,779.8 inhabitants per square mile (687.2/km^{2}). There were 9,272 housing units at an average density of 866.5 per square mile (334.6/km^{2}). The racial makeup of the city was 88.86% White, 0.83% African American, 3.20% Native American, 1.75% Asian, 0.18% Pacific Islander, 0.90% from some other races and 4.27% from two or more races. Hispanic or Latino people of any race were 4.03% of the population.

There were 8,459 households, of which 25.7% had children under the age of 18 living with them, 39.9% were married couples living together, 11.8% had a female householder with no husband present, 5.1% had a male householder with no wife present, and 43.2% were non-families. 35.5% of all households were made up of individuals, and 14.6% had someone living alone who was 65 years of age or older. The average household size was 2.19 and the average family size was 2.79.

The median age in the city was 41.6 years. 20.6% of residents were under the age of 18; 9.7% were between the ages of 18 and 24; 23.4% were from 25 to 44; 28.3% were from 45 to 64; and 18% were 65 years of age or older. The gender makeup of the city was 48.6% male and 51.4% female.

=== 2000 census ===
As of the 2000 census, there were 18,397 people, 8,053 households, and 4,831 families residing in the city. The population density was 1,823.1 inhabitants per square mile (703.9/km^{2}). There were 8,682 housing units at an average density of 860.4 per square mile (332.2/km^{2}). The racial makeup of the city was 91.35% White, 0.69% African American, 3.26% Native American, 1.29% Asian, 0.17% Pacific Islander, 0.38% from some other races and 2.85% from two or more races. Hispanic or Latino people of any race were 2.34% of the population.

There were 8,053 households, out of which 28.1% had children under the age of 18 living with them, 44.0% were married couples living together, 12.2% had a female householder with no husband present, and 40.0% were non-families. 34.0% of all households were made up of individuals, and 15.2% had someone living alone who was 65 years of age or older. The average household size was 2.24 and the average family size was 2.84.

In the city, the age distribution of the population shows 23.7% under the age of 18, 8.6% from 18 to 24, 25.4% from 25 to 44, 23.9% from 45 to 64, and 18.4% who were 65 years of age or older. The median age was 40 years. For every 100 females, there were 92.1 males. For every 100 females age 18 and over, there were 87.6 males.

The median income for a household in the city was $33,130, and the median income for a family was $41,450. Males had a median income of $33,351 versus $25,215 for females. The per capita income for the city was $17,903. About 9.9% of families and 13.2% of the population were below the poverty line, including 17.3% of those under age 18 and 6.7% of those age 65 or over.

== Media ==
=== Newspapers ===
The local newspaper is the Peninsula Daily News, originally the Port Angeles Evening News (founded 1916). The Peninsula Daily News publishes six days a week and hosts a website for the North Olympic Peninsula.

=== Radio ===
Newsradio 1450 KONP is a local radio station offering news, sports, information and talk programming on AM 1450. The station is also broadcast on FM 101.7 (founded 1945). The Strait 102 KSTI is an FM radio station playing country music. KSTI is located at FM 102.1

=== Television and movies ===
Port Angeles is the home base of Rygaard Logging, one of the logging companies featured in the second season of the History Channel program Ax Men.

The Strait of Juan de Fuca north of Port Angeles was used for filming some of the open water scenes in the 1990 film The Hunt for Red October. Port Angeles was also used in the last scene of the 1994 movie Wyatt Earp when Wyatt and Josie were on the boat out from the harbor with the Olympic Mountains in the distance.

Port Angeles is featured in Twilight, during a date between Bella and Edward at the real-life restaurant "Bella Italia".

== Education ==
Public school education is provided by the Port Angeles School District which operates five elementary schools, one middle school, a high school, an alternative high school and a vocational school. In addition, there are two private schools, Queen of Angels Catholic School and Olympic Christian School, both of which serve grades K-8.

Peninsula College is a community college based in Port Angeles that serves the Olympic Peninsula.

== Sister city ==
Mutsu, Aomori, Japan and Port Angeles became sister cities in 1995. They have operated an exchange student program intermittently since 1997.

== Notable people ==
- Robin Alexis, New Age radio personality
- Scott Bower, soccer player
- Harold G. Bradbury, U.S. Coast Guard Rear Admiral
- Raymond Carver, author
- Casey Crescenzo, musician
- Matthew Dryke, former international shooter and Olympic gold medalist
- John Elway, former player for the Denver Broncos
- Bernie Fryer, NBA/ABA basketball player
- Tess Gallagher, author
- Patrick Haggerty, country singer
- Derek Kilmer, U.S. Congressman
- Sean Mac Falls, poet
- Ellie Mathews, children's writer
- Jim Michalczik, football coach and former NFL player
- Robert Hopkins Miller, diplomat
- Jeff Ridgway, Major League Baseball player
- Arnie Roblan, politician
- Jeff Suffering, singer for Ninety Pound Wuss
- Bryan Suits, radio host, podcaster, US Army combat veteran, historian
- Amelia Talon, Playboy Playmate

== See also ==
- Juan Carrasco (explorer)
- Tse-whit-zen
- List of deepest natural harbours
