= Ediz Hook =

Sand spit in Washington, United States

Coordinates: 48°8′29″N 123°26′15″W

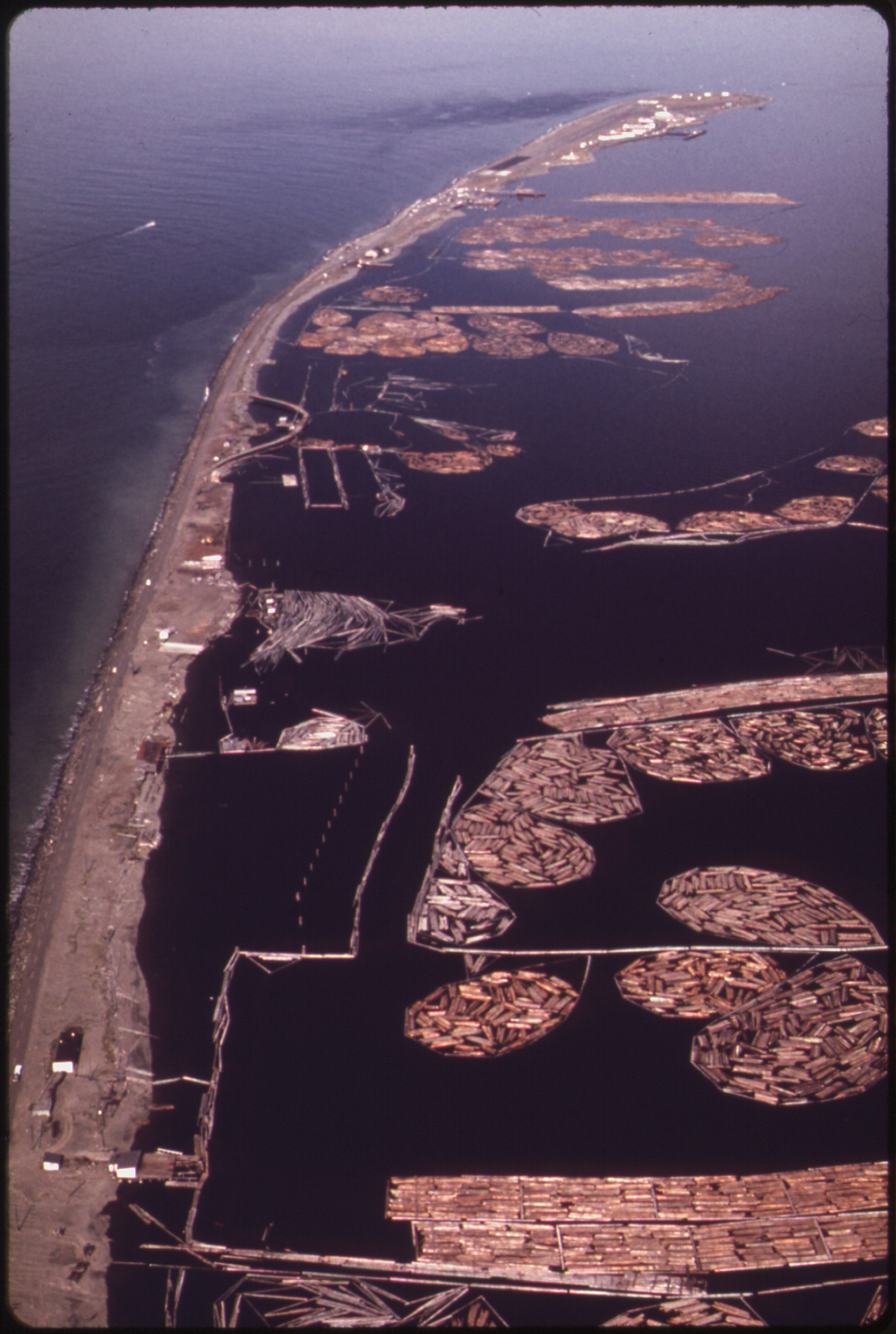
Ediz Hook in 1973. The rafts of logs visible are waiting for use in a paper plant located at the base of the Hook.

Ediz Hook is a 3-mile-long (4.8 km) sand spit that extends from northern shore of the Olympic Peninsula at Port Angeles in northcentral Clallam County, Washington, USA, northeasterly into the Strait of Juan de Fuca, located about 15-mile (24 km) west of the larger Dungeness Spit. It is relatively narrow at points, but broader toward the base and the northeast tip.

Much of the spit is accessible by car on the Ediz Hook Road (1.5 to 2 miles), which passes several turnouts and picnic areas, with broad views of Port Angeles and the Olympic Mountains, notably the peaks of Mount Angeles and Klahhane Ridge. To the north marine traffic can be observed, and orca pods, harbor seals and other marine life can be spotted. Several long stretches of public beach facilitate beachcombing and birdwatching. The end of the spit is used by the Coast Guard and not accessible to visitors.

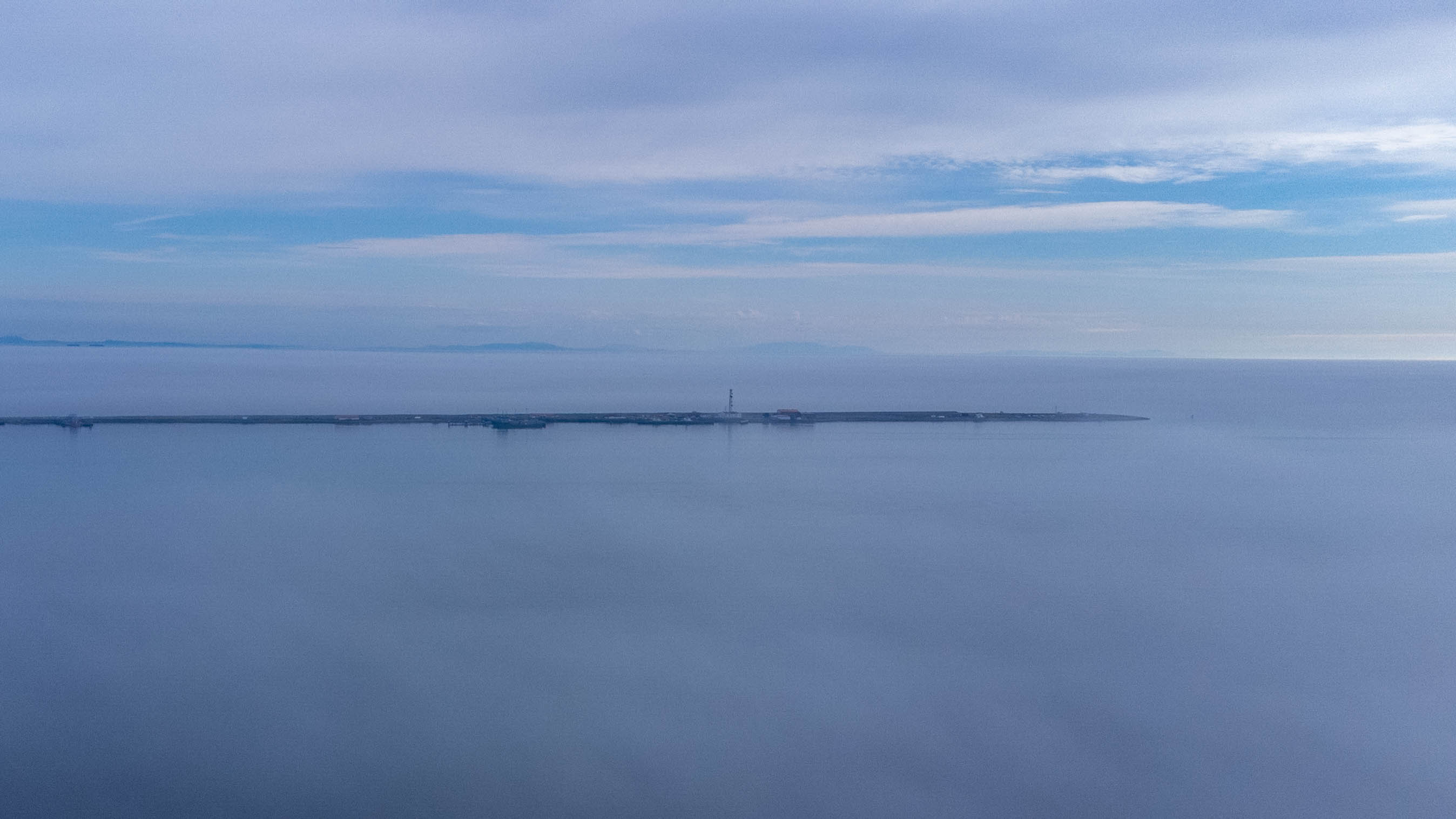
The Coast Guard station on the hook

"The Hook" was created by wind and tidal action along the southern edge of the Strait, that carried sediment from the delta of the Elwha River eastward. The presence of the sand spit creates a natural harbor to the south, with the spit sheltering the area off Port Angeles from the large ocean-sourced swells that roll eastward down the Strait.

The calm waters of the harbor and sandy beaches attracted people to the area long before the appearance of European explorers and settlers. Recently uncovered archeological evidence indicates that a community, known today as Tse-whit-zen, was occupied for generations by the Klallam Native American people.

After white settlement, the Ediz Hook Light was established to guide ships safely by the spit in low-visibility conditions. Currently, the end of the spit serves as home for the Coast Guard Air Station Port Angeles. It is also the base of operations for the Puget Sound Pilots.

For the past few decades, notable erosion of Ediz Hook has occurred. This is believed to be caused by the presence of the Elwha River dams, which have reduced the amount of sediment carried by the river. The Elwha Ecosystem Restoration project has completed a program of dam removal that has restored the original flow patterns of the Elwha river and is expected to diminish this loss. Several projects have added large boulders to the northwest side of the spit to slow its erosion and protect the Port Angeles Harbor.

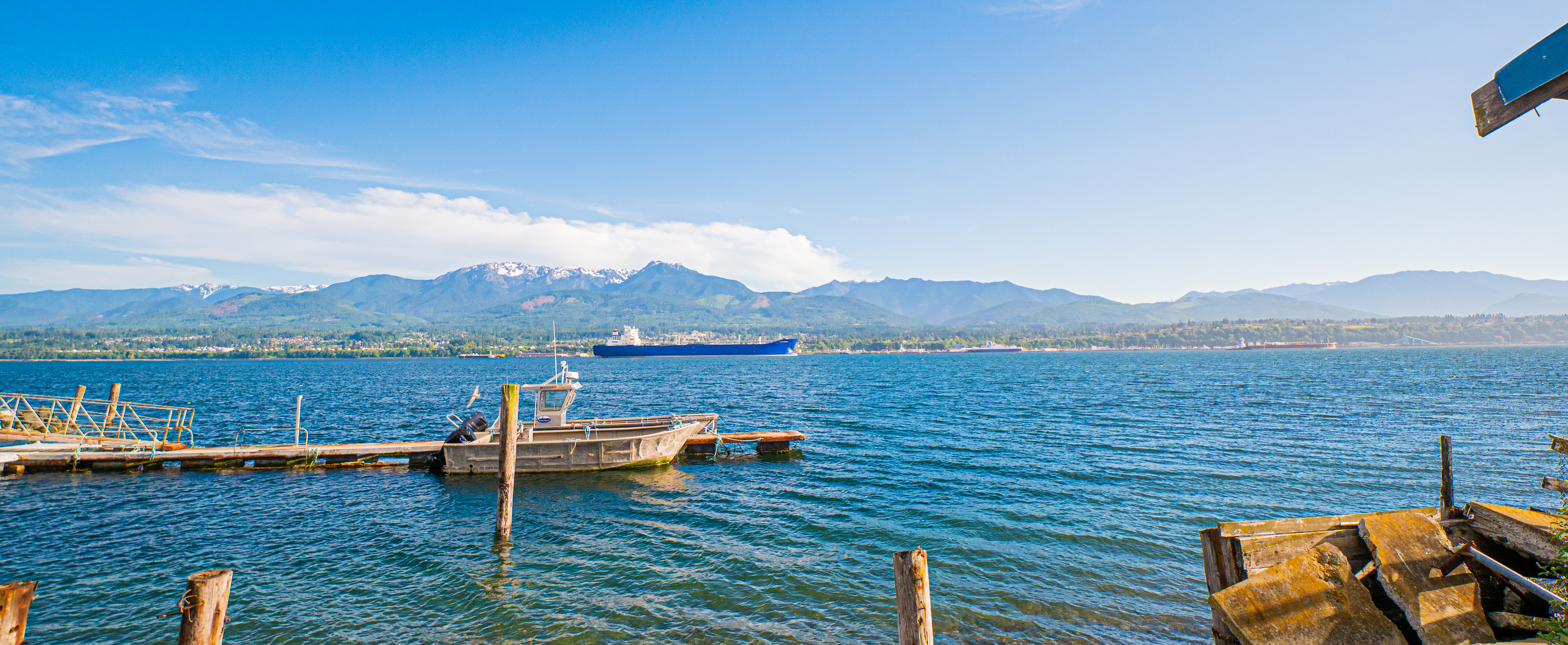
The unique geographical placement of Ediz Hook showcases the relatively close perimeter of the Olympic Mountain range.
