= Coast Guard Air Station Port Angeles =

US Coast Guard base in Port Angeles, Washington

Coordinates: 48°08′27″N 123°24′39″W

USCG Air Station Port Angeles
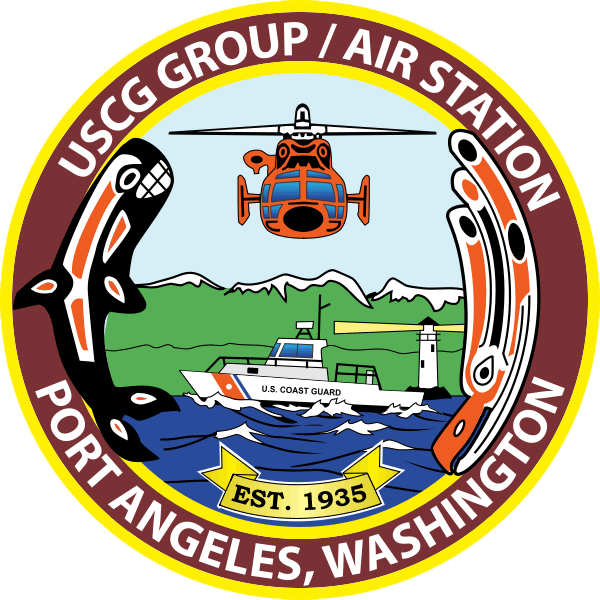
- Unit Patch CGAS Port Angeles
- Active: 1935–present
- Country: United States
- Branch: United States Coast Guard
- Type: Air Station
- Role: Air Station Port Angeles is responsible for conducting Search and Rescue, Law Enforcement/Homeland Security and Resource Protection activities in an area that includes the Strait of Juan De Fuca and the north western coast of Washington around the Olympic Peninsula to the mouth of Puget Sound.
- Base: Port Angeles CGAS (NOW)

Commanders
- Commanding Officer: CDR Kelly Higgins
- Executive Officer: CDR Justin Church
- Command Senior Chief: AETCS Jeremy Clark

Aircraft flown
- Helicopter: MH-65E

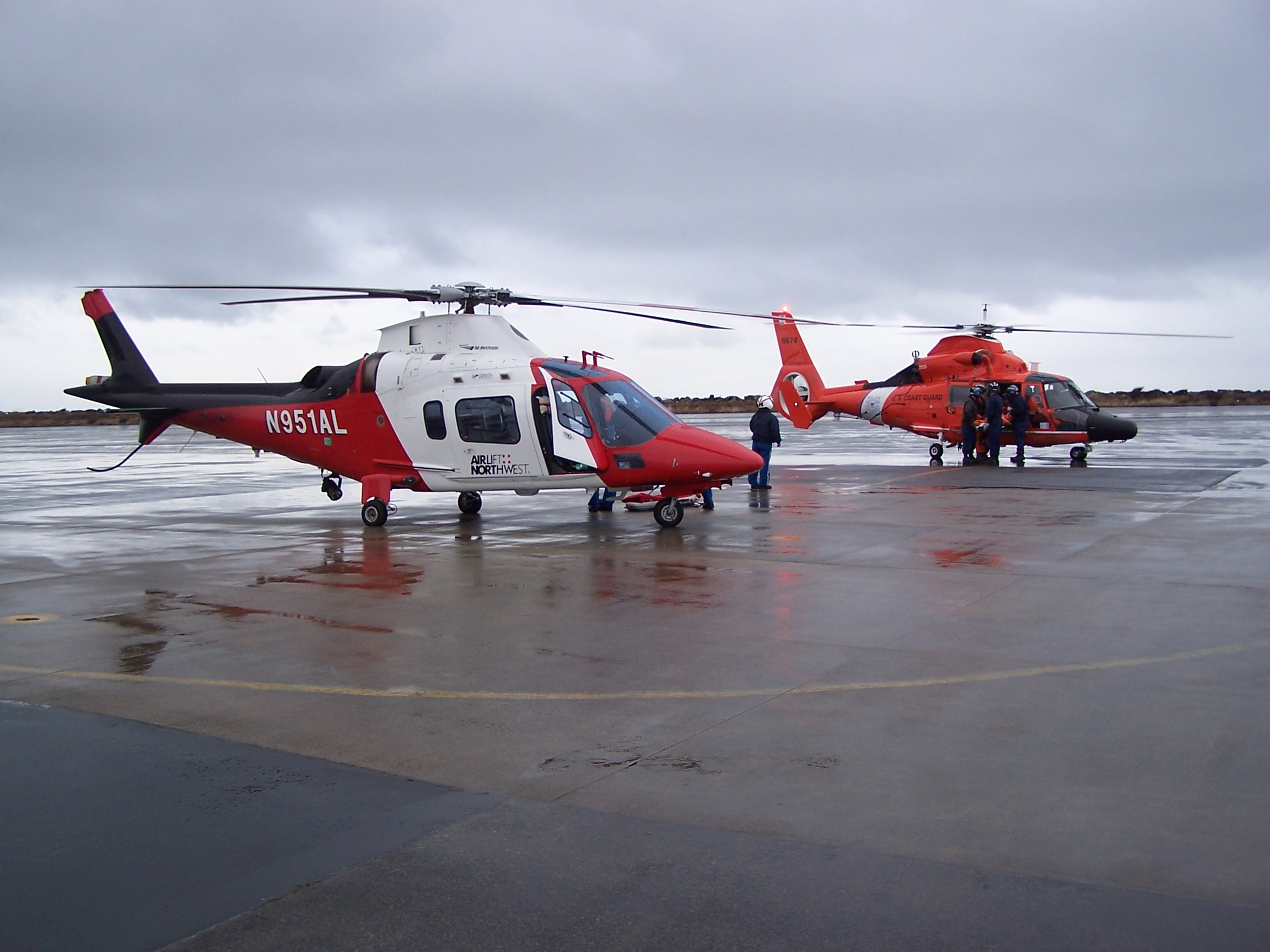
An Airlift Northwest Crew receives a patient transfer at Air Station Port Angeles

US Coast Guard Air Station Port Angeles (ICAO: KNOW, FAA LID: NOW) is located at the end of the Ediz Hook peninsula in Port Angeles, Washington.

== History ==
The Coast Guard's presence in Port Angeles began on August 1, 1862 with the arrival of the SHUBRICK, the first Revenue Cutter to be home ported on the Olympic Peninsula. Ediz Hook, a level sand spit extending from the mainland north and east into the Strait of Juan de Fuca, was declared a Federal Lighthouse Reservation by President Lincoln in 1863. The first lighthouse was commissioned on 1 April 1865. The Air Station was commissioned on 1 June 1935, becoming the first permanent Coast Guard Air Station on the Pacific Coast. Its location was chosen for its strategic position for coastal defense of the Northwest. The first aircraft, a Douglas RD-4 amphibian, arrived 11 June 1935 and flew the first "mercy hop" in August 1935. The 75-foot patrol boats were also stationed at the new unit.

During World War II, the Air Station expanded to include a gunnery school, training aerial gunners and local defense forces. A short runway was added to train Navy pilots for carrier landings. It also hosted independent units such as Naval Intelligence and was Headquarters of the Air Sea Rescue System for the Northwest Sea Frontier Area. By the end of 1944, the Air Station had 29 aircraft assigned.

In September 1944 the station officially became Coast Guard Group Port Angeles, with several sub-units including the Air Station, Station Bellingham, Station Neah Bay, Station Port Angeles, Station Quillayute River, USCGC Adelie, USCGC BLUE SHARK, USCGC CUTTYHUNK, USCGC OSPREY, USCGC SEA LION, USCGC Swordfish, USCGC TERRAPIN, and USCGC Wahoo.

In 1946, the first helicopter, a Sikorsky HO3S-1G arrived. This was replaced in 1951 with the Sikorsky HO4S helicopter (the "Eggbeater"). The last fixed wing aircraft, the Grumman HU-16E Albatross (the "Goat") was retired in 1973. Since then the Air Station has been home to helicopters only, starting with the HH-52A Seaguard, first acquired in 1965. The HH-52A was replaced in 1988 with the new American Eurocopter HH-65A Dolphin twin turbine helicopter. During a typical year, Group Port Angeles units carried out over 400 search and rescue missions, saving 35 lives and assisting 500 persons. Each year, property valued at over $2 million was saved. On 30 JUL 2010, Group/Air Station Port Angeles was reorganized into Air Station / Sector Field Office Port Angeles. The Sector Field Office logistically supports Station Neah Bay, Station Port Angeles, Station Quillayute River, USCGC Active (WMEC-618), USCGC Adelie, USCGC Cutthyhunk, USCGC Swordfish, and USCGC Wahoo.

Beginning in 2015, the personnel of Air Station Port Angeles began joint evacuation drills with the Puget Sound Pilots, also based on Ediz Hook, as part of a tsunami preparedness planning effort in case of a major earthquake in the Puget Sound area. Evacuation drills ceased in 2018. As of 2024, the unit is fielded with three MH-65E helicopters, conducts approximately 150 SAR/LE cases per year, approximately saving 20 lives and assisting 40 persons in distress.

== Operational area ==
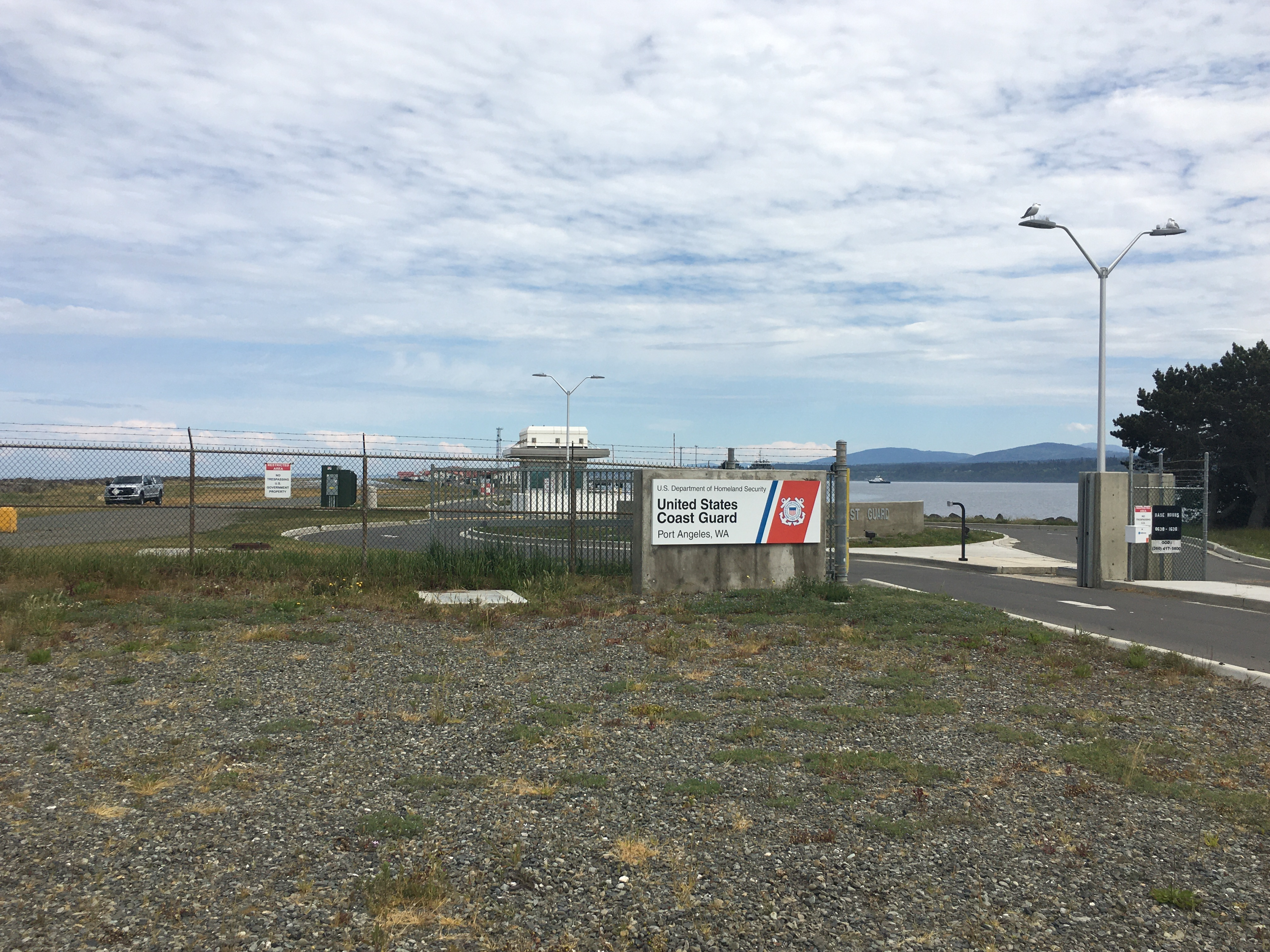
The entrance and sign of the station.

Air Station Port Angeles is the US Coast Guard's oldest operational air station, in operation since 1935 and today supports three MH-65E Dolphin helicopters, which have been operating at the station since 1984. This air station is well placed as Port Angeles is a port city with ferries to Canada.

Its general operational area is the central and eastern parts of the Strait of Juan de Fuca, from Pillar Point to the south of Whidbey Island. 18 miles to the north is British Columbia and the city of Victoria.

The main roles of the station is search and rescue, maritime law enforcement, waterway security, boating and fishery safety and environmental protection. The station also works in conjunction with Coast Guard Sector Puget Sound, as well as local, state and federal law enforcement agencies of Jefferson and Clallam counties.

== Housing ==
At Coast Guard Air Station Port Angeles there are no housing facilities available for crew and officers, so renting accommodation in Port Angeles is the only option.
