= Washington State Route 110 =

State highway in Clallam County, Washington, US

State Route 110
- La Push Road; Operations Desert Shield and Desert Storm Memorial Highway
- SR 110 highlighted in red

Route information
- Auxiliary route of US 101
- Maintained by WSDOT
- Length: 11.10 mi (17.86 km)
- Existed: 1991–present

Major junctions
- East end: US 101 in Forks
- SR 110 Spur near Mora
- West end: Olympic National Park boundary

Location
- Country: United States
- State: Washington
- Counties: Clallam

Highway system
- State highways in Washington; Interstate; US; State; Scenic; Pre-1964; 1964 renumbering; Former
← SR 109	→ SR 112

State Route 110 (SR 110) is a 11.10-mile-long (17.86 km) state highway serving Olympic National Park and the Quileute Indian Reservation within Clallam County, located in the U.S. state of Washington. The highway travels west from U.S. Route 101 (US 101) in Forks as La Push Road along the Quileute and Sol Duc rivers to the boundary of Olympic National Park east of La Push. La Push Road was originally added to the state highway system in 1937 as Secondary State Highway 9B (SSH 9B), but was removed in 1955. SR 110 was later established on the route in 1991 after a previous highway with the same designation was removed. A spur route extending west to Mora was originally added with SSH 9B and re-added with SR 110 in 1991.

== Route description ==
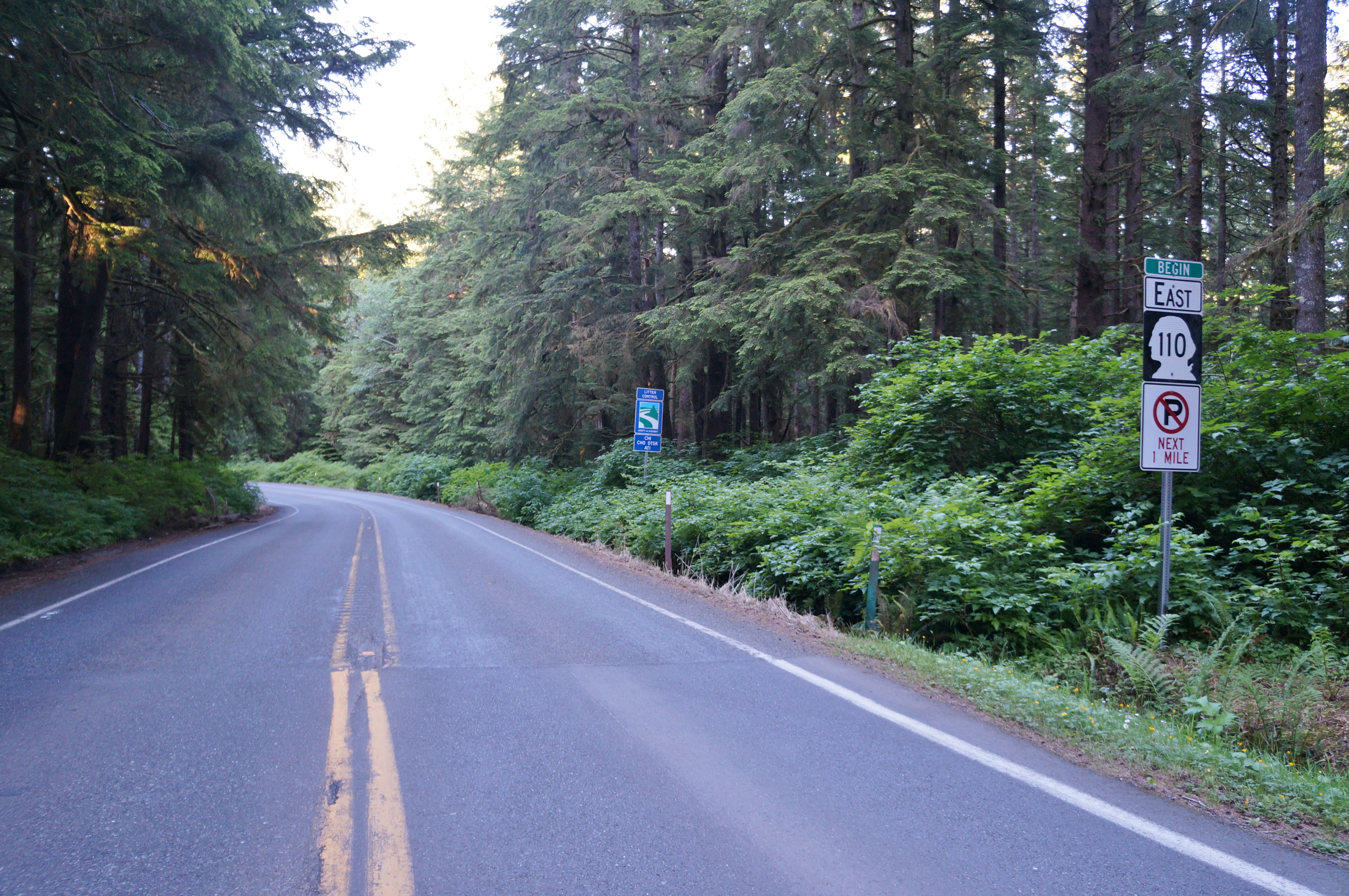
The western end of SR 110 near La Push

SR 110 begins as La Push Road at an intersection with US 101 in Forks, located between the Sol Duc and Calawah rivers. The highway travels southwest towards the Pacific Ocean, intersecting its spur route to Mora before crossing the Bogachiel River and ending at the entrance to Olympic National Park. La Push Road continues northwest into the Quileute Indian Reservation and the community of La Push.

Every year, the Washington State Department of Transportation (WSDOT) conducts a series of surveys on its highways in the state to measure traffic volume. This is expressed in terms of annual average daily traffic (AADT), which is a measure of traffic volume for any average day of the year. In 2011, WSDOT calculated that between 1,300 and 2,300 vehicles per day used the highway, mostly at the US 101 intersection.

== History ==
SR 110 was established in 1991 on the existing La Push Road from US 101 in Forks to Olympic National Park, previously part of SSH 9B. SSH 9B and a spur route to Mora was designated in 1937 as part of the newly created Primary and secondary state highways, but was removed in 1955. It was transferred to the county government in June 1955 and was later repaved with concrete. After the 1964 highway renumbering, a separate SR 110 was established as an auxiliary route of SR 11, extending from the highway in Fairhaven to Interstate 5 (I-5) in Bellingham. SR 11 replaced SR 110 after being re-aligned to end at I-5 in 1975. SR 110 was designated as the Operations Desert Shield and Desert Storm Memorial Highway by the state legislature and state transportation commission in 2010.

== Spur route ==
State Route 110 Spur
- Location: Unincorporated Clallam County
- Length: 2.67 mi (4.30 km)
- Existed: 1991–present

SR 110 has a 2.67-mile-long (4.30 km) spur route serving Mora to the north of the Quileute River. The highway, known as Mora Road, begins at SR 110 west of Forks and travels west across the Sol Duc River into Olympic National Park and the Quileute Indian Reservation, crossing the Dickey River into Mora. The gravel road was added to the state highway system as a spur of SSH 9B in 1937, but the highways were removed in 1955. After SR 110 was re-added to the state highway system in 1991, the spur route was put into state maintenance once again.

== Major intersections ==
The entire highway is in Clallam County.

Location	mi	km	Destinations	Notes
Forks	0.00	0.00	US 101 – Port Angeles, Aberdeen	Eastern terminus
	7.80	12.55	SR 110 Spur west (Mora Road) – Mora	
	11.10	17.86	Olympic National Park boundary	Western terminus; continues as La Push Road
1.000 mi = 1.609 km; 1.000 km = 0.621 mi
