= Sol Duc River =

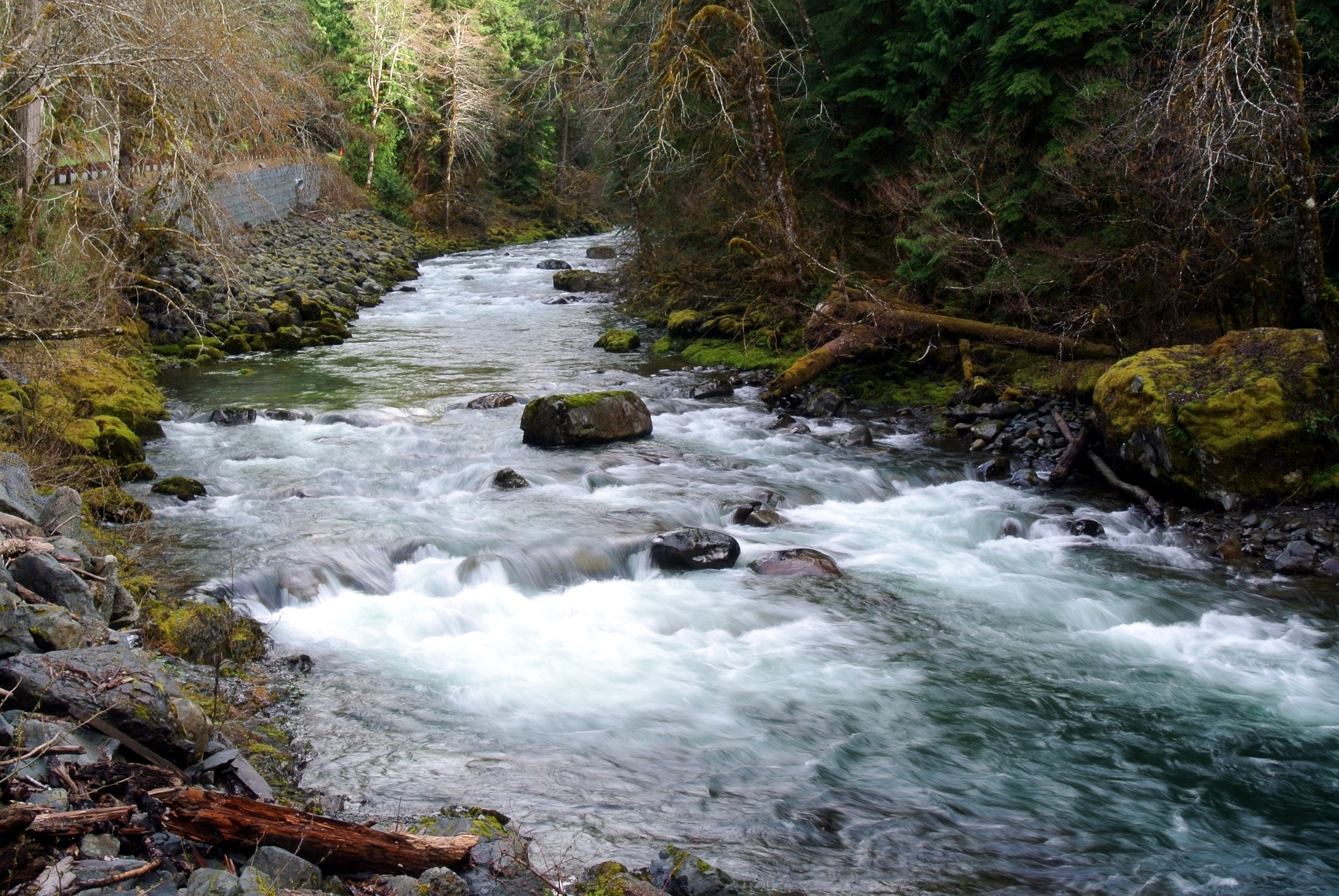
- Sol Duc River

- Location of the mouth of the Sol Duc River in Washington

Location
- Country: United States
- State: Washington
- County: Clallam

Physical characteristics
- Source: Olympic Mountains
  - coordinates: 47°55′30″N 123°41′59″W
- Mouth: Quillayute River
  - coordinates: 47°54′50″N 124°32′31″W
- Length: 78 mi (126 km)
- Basin size: 219 sq mi (570 km^{2})
- Discharge
  - location: river mile 13.8
  - average: 1,270 cu ft/s (36 m^{3}/s)
  - minimum: 214 cu ft/s (6.1 m^{3}/s)
  - maximum: 19,200 cu ft/s (540 m^{3}/s)

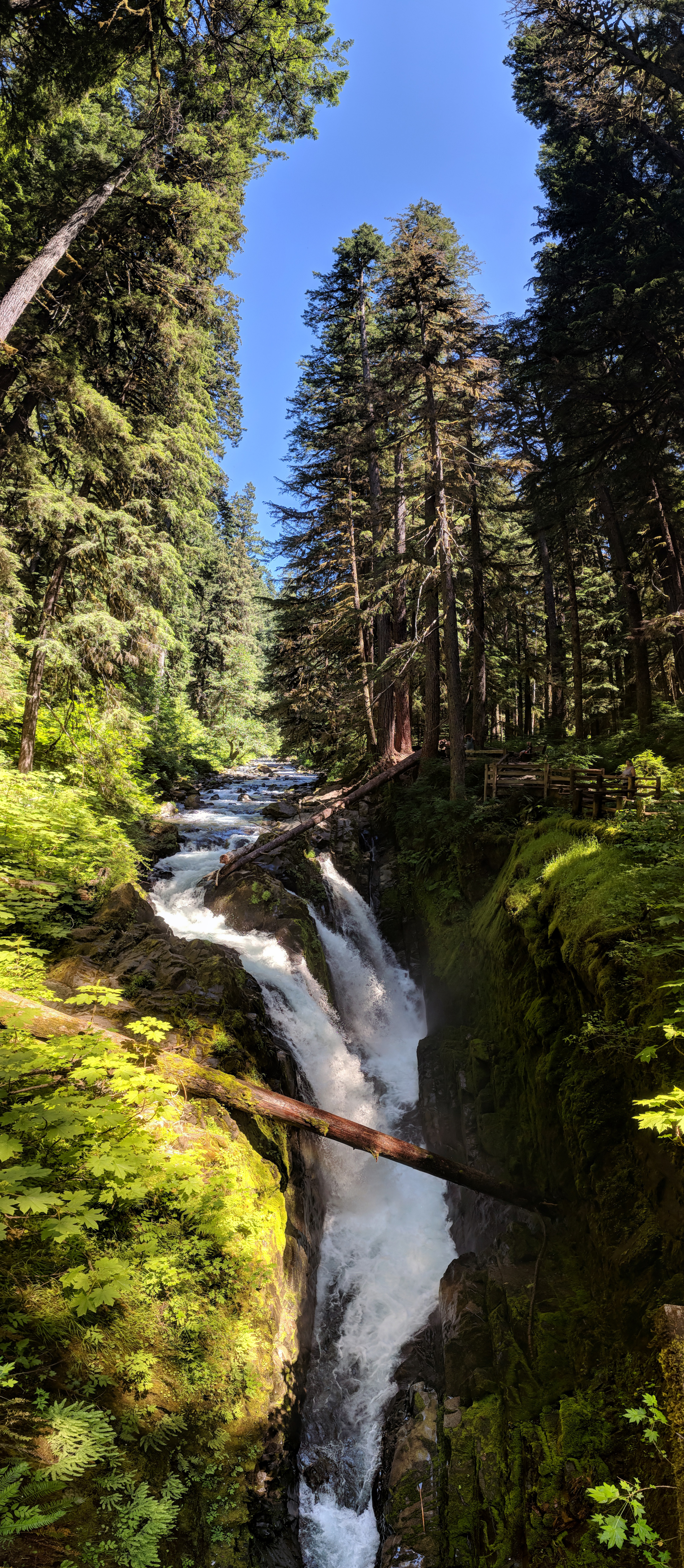
Vertical panoramic view of Sol Duc Falls

The Sol Duc River (also spelled Soleduck) is a river in the U.S. state of Washington. About 78 miles (126 km) long, it flows west through the northwest part of the Olympic Peninsula, from the Olympic Mountains of Olympic National Park and Olympic National Forest, then through the broad Sol Duc Valley. Near the Pacific Ocean the Sol Duc River joins the Bogachiel River, forming the Quillayute River, which flows about 4 miles (6.4 km) to the Pacific Ocean at La Push. Although the Quillayute River is short, its large tributary rivers—the Sol Duc, Bogachiel, Calawah, and Dickey Rivers—drain the largest watershed of the northern Olympic Peninsula, 629 square miles (1,630 km^{2}). The Sol Duc's watershed is the largest of the Quillayute's tributaries, at 219 square miles (570 km^{2}).

The Sol Duc River's main tributaries are its two forks, the North Fork Sol Duc River and the South Fork Sol Duc River. Other notable tributaries include Bear Creek, Beaver Creek, and Lake Creek.

Much of the Sol Duc River's watershed is valuable timber land. Most of the forests have been logged at least once. The forests within Olympic National Park are protected.

U.S. Route 101 follows the Sol Duc River for many miles through Olympic National Forest and the Sol Duc Valley to the vicinity of Forks. The city of Forks is so named due to the close convergence of the Sol Duc, Bogachiel, and Calawah Rivers.

== Name ==
There are two common spellings of the river's name, Sol Duc and Soleduck. Before 1992 the accepted spelling was "Soleduck". In 1992 the spelling was officially changed to "Sol Duc" by the State of Washington Board on Geographic Names. The name comes from its Quileute name, só·liƚt̓aḳʷ, meaning "sparkling waters".

== Streamflow ==
The discharge, or streamflow of the Sol Duc River has considerable seasonal variation. According to George Wuerthner, the river's average winter flow is 104.75 cubic metres per second (3,699 cu ft/s) but its average summer flow is only 12.74 m^{3}/s (450 cu ft/s). Wuerthner cites slightly different annual streamflow figures than the Washington Department of Ecology. Also, Wuerthner uses metric units while Ecology uses imperial units. Wuerthner says the mean annual flow is 37 m^{3}/s (1,300 cu ft/s), Ecology says it is 1,270 cu ft/s (36 m^{3}/s). The maximum and minimum recorded discharges were, according to Wuerthner, 588.85 m^{3}/s (20,795 cu ft/s) and 4.39 m^{3}/s (155 cu ft/s). According to Ecology they were 19,200 cu ft/s (540 m^{3}/s) and 214 cu ft/s (6.1 m^{3}/s).

== Course ==
The Sol Duc River originates in the northern Olympic Mountains, in Olympic National Park, on the north side of High Divide, which separates the Sol Duc and Hoh River watersheds. Bogachiel Peak is part of the High Divide. The Bogachiel River rises near Bogachiel Peak and flows south of the Sol Duc River. The confluence of the two forms the Quillayute River.

The Sol Duc flows generally west and northwest, collecting numerous headwater tributaries. Bridge Creek, which flows from Heart Lake in the high alpine Soleduck Park, joins the Sol Duc in Soleduck Flats. Rocky Creek flows from Mount Appleton near Appleton Pass, joining the Sol Duc from the north. Seven Lakes Creek flows from Seven Lakes Basin through several lakes including Soleduck Lake, to join the Sol Duc River from the south.

The Salmon Cascades on the Sol Duc River in Olympic National Park.

The river plunges over Sol Duc Falls, after which Canyon Creek joins from the south. The Sol Duc turns more directly northwest and its valley broadens. It passes Sol Duc Hot Springs, a resort spa built in 1912 and refurbished in the 1980s by the National Park Service. Nearby is the Sol Duc Campground, and the Soleduck Ranger Station, after which its valley becomes considerably wider. The Sol Duc River continues northwest, paralleled by the Sol Duc Road leading to the campground. For a short distance the boundary of Olympic National Park runs approximately along the river. Just before the river exits the national park it is joined by its two main tributaries. First the North Fork Sol Duc River then the South Fork Sol Duc River. Goodman Creek joins about a mile below the South Fork confluence.

After leaving Olympic National Park the Sol Duc River flows west through part of Olympic National Forest. Its valley, here called the Sol Duc Valley, widens to about a mile across. The valley, about 35 miles (56 km) long, continues to widen as the river flows west and southwest. U.S. Route 101 runs through most of the valley. Numerous tributaries flow from the high mountain ridges to the north and south. Kugel Creek joins the river near the Forest Service's Klahowya Campground. A few miles west of the campground the river exits Olympic National Forest. Bear Creek joins from the north near Bear Creek Campground. Beaver Creek joins from the north near Sappho, after which the Sol Duc River begins to turn more to the southwest and south. The Soleduck Salmon Hatchery is located along the river near Lake Pleasant and the community of Beaver. Lake Creek, flowing from Lake Pleasant, joins the Sol Duc near Shuwah.

For several miles the Sol Duc River flows very close to the Calawah River, a tributary of the Bogachiel River. U.S. Route 101 leaves the Sol Duc Valley in this area, turning south toward Forks. Washington State Route 110, called La Push Road, continues down the Sol Duc Valley. After making a number of large meanders the Sol Duc River ends at its confluence with the Bogachiel River. The combined rivers are known as the Quillayute River, which flows west several miles and empties into the Pacific Ocean near La Push.

=== North Fork Sol Duc River ===
The North Fork Sol Duc River originates at 47°56′52″N 123°45′2″W, on the west slope of Mount Appleton. It flows generally northwest, joining the Sol Duc River near Fairholm, about 4 miles (6.4 km) southeast of Mount Muller. It is approximately 13.5 miles (21.7 km) long. The North Fork is entirely within Olympic National Park.

=== South Fork Sol Duc River ===
The South Fork Sol Duc River originates at 47°57′5″N 123°58′11″W, on the west slope of Pine Mountain. It flows north, joining the Sol Duc River 2.8 miles (4.5 km) southwest of Fairholm and 4 miles (6.4 km) south of Mount Muller. It is approximately 7.7 miles (12.4 km) long. Tom Creek joins less than a mile from the South Fork's confluence with the main stem Sol Duc River. The South Fork is entirely within Olympic National Forest.

== History ==
In the early 20th century the logging potential of the northwest Olympic Peninsula drew increasing numbers of settlers. Tracts of timberland were purchased throughout the Sol Duc watershed, especially in the relatively accessible Sol Duc Valley. In January 1921 a massive "blowdown" toppled trees over a wide region between the Sol Duc and Hoh River. At least 1,700 trees were toppled in the Sol Duc Valley along the road between Sappho and Lake Crescent. Many settlers who had claimed timberland in order to sell to timber companies found their land worthless. Many simply moved away.

Large wildfires burned through the forests of the upper Sol Duc Valley in 1907 and in the 1951 Forks Fire. Wildfires in this area tend to spread quickly east to west while remaining narrow north to south. This is due to the wind patterns near Lake Crescent, where east winds accelerate as they are funneled through a narrow valley corridor west of Lake Crescent and into the Sol Duc Valley.

The 1951 fire started on September 20 after 108 days without rain. Driven by high winds the fire spread west down the Sol Duc Valley at a rate of about 18 miles (29 km) in 6 hours. Over 30,000 acres (120 km^{2}) of timber was destroyed. Smoke in the city of Forks was so dense that drivers evacuating in the middle of the day could barely see the road. The fire reached the edge of Forks, destroying 28 houses and a number of other buildings before a light rain began to fall, halting and eventually putting out the fire.

== Natural history ==
The Sol Duc and the other tributaries of the Quillayute River support some of the healthiest stocks of wild winter steelhead in the Pacific Northwest, with as many as 19,000 steelhead returning to spawn in some years. There are also large runs of chinook and coho salmon. The lack of glaciers at stream headwaters keeps the consistency of river fish habitats. Of the Quillayute's tributaries, the Sol Duc River is remarkable in its migratory fish diversity and health. It is the only Quillayute tributary that supports spring chinook salmon. It contains sockeye salmon in June and July and so-called summer coho salmon in August and September. Coastal cutthroat trout also spawn in the Sol Duc River.

The Sol Duc River is one of the only rivers of the Olympic Peninsula that supports all five major species of salmon. The upper Sol Duc is a prime coho spawning stream.

== Tributaries ==
Selected tributaries are listed from the source to the mouth of the Sol Duc River. "Left" and "Right" notes indicate the direction from which the tributary enters the Sol Duc looking downriver (towards the river's mouth). Multiple bullet points indicate tributaries of tributaries.

- Blackwood Creek (left)
- Munden Creek (left)
- Alkee Creek (left)
- South Fork Sol Duc River (left)
  - Tom Creek (left)
- North Fork Sol Duc River (right)
- Goodman Creek (left)
- Camp Creek (left)
- Kugel Creek (left)
- Bear Creek (right)
- Beaver Creek (right)
- Bockman Creek (left)
- Lake Creek (right)
- Shuwah Creek (left)
  - Maxfield Creek (left)
- Tassel Creek (left)
- Sanderson Creek (right)

== See also ==
- List of Washington rivers
