= Bogachiel State Park =

State park in the U.S. state of Washington

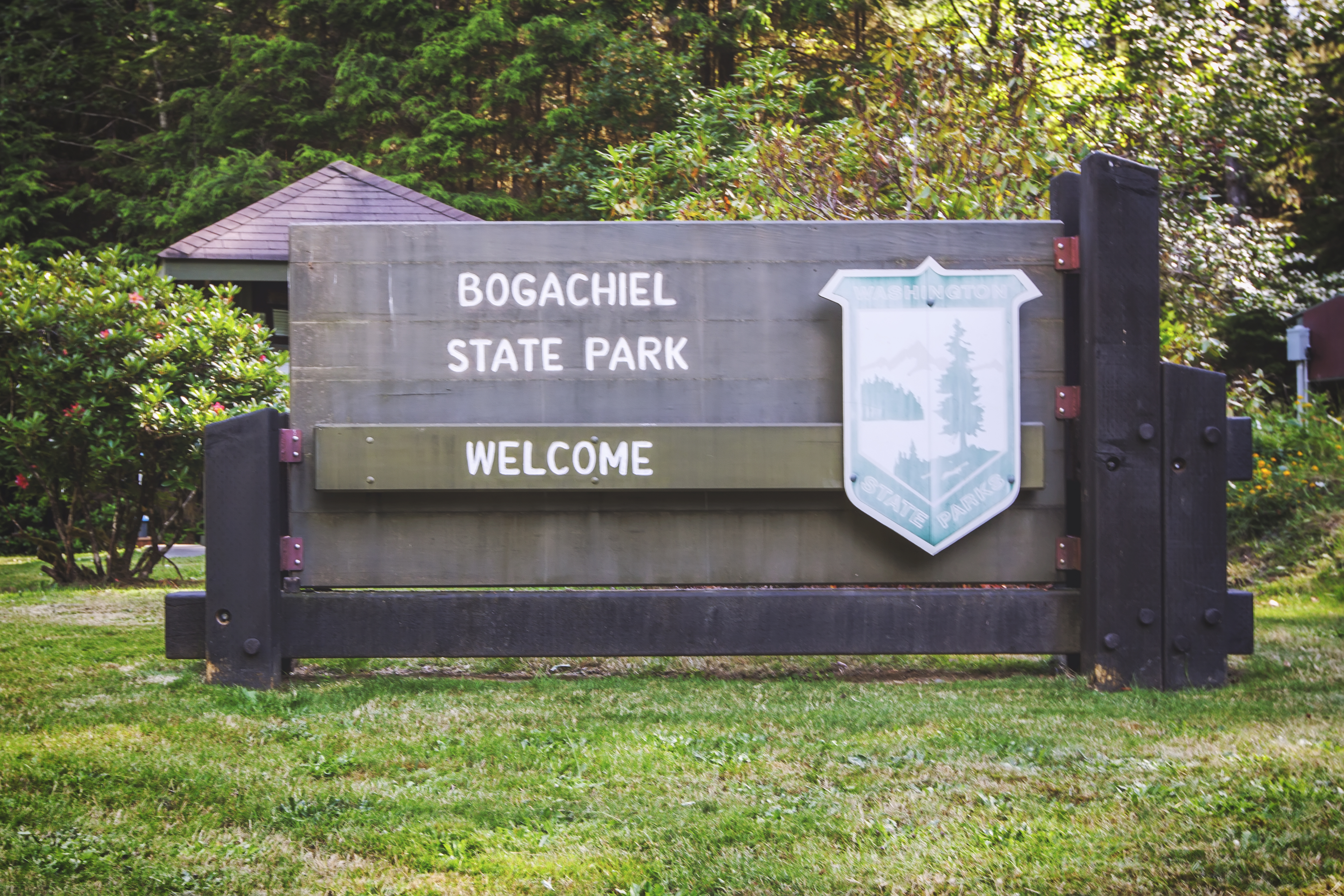

- Location within Washington (state) Location within the United States
- Interactive map of Bogachiel State Park
- Location: Clallam County, Washington, United States
- Nearest city: Forks, Washington
- Coordinates: 47°53′48″N 124°21′38″W
- Area: 127 acres (51 ha)
- Elevation: 348 ft (106 m)
- Established: 1931
- Administrator: Washington State Parks and Recreation Commission
- Website: Official website

Bogachiel State Park is a 127-acre (51 ha) public recreation area on the Bogachiel River four miles (6.4 km) south of the city of Forks on Highway 101 in Clallam County, Washington. The state park was established in 1931, with initial management and development performed under the auspices of the Bogachiel Improvement Club and Forks Chamber of Commerce. State staffing began in 1961. The park has facilities for picnicking, camping, and hiking.
