= Olympic Animal Sanctuary =

The now defunct Olympic Animal Sanctuary (OAS) was located in Forks, Washington. It was a 501(c)3 non-profit animal sanctuary, founded in 2006.

== Overview ==
The sanctuary's primary exempt purpose was, "Prevention of cruelty to animals".

A Los Angeles Times article about the sanctuary, indicated some of the dogs were, "the worst of the worst from around the country." A People Magazine article about Steve Markwell outlined the purpose of the sanctuary, referring to it as a, "Last Chance for Bad Dogs."

== Allegations of animal abuse ==
In December 2013, after allegations of animal abuse were made by former sanctuary volunteers and the sanctuary received negative publicity on television, Steve Markwell announced the sanctuary would be closing and he wanted to transfer the dogs to Best Friends Animal Society, in Utah.

Markwell loaded the dogs into a 53-foot semi-trailer on December 21, 2013, and left Forks.

Unable to reach an agreement with Best Friends Animal Society, Markwell made arrangements with Guardians of Rescue, a New York-based rescue, to take possession of the dogs on December 24, 2013, at the RUFFF site in Golden Valley, Arizona.

All of the sanctuary's dogs that were released to Guardians of Rescue, were eventually taken in by other organizations or placed into homes.

== Charity status ==
On July 29, 2014, the Washington State Attorney General announced a complaint was filed against Markwell. According to the Attorney General's complaint, filed in Clallam County Superior Court, Markwell was accused of soliciting for and collecting funds while not registered as a charity, and failing to keep adequate financial records.

KOMO-TV News reported on April 7, 2015, Markwell was found guilty of 48 violations of charitable solicitation laws, based on charges filed by the Washington Attorney General.
