= Bogachiel River =

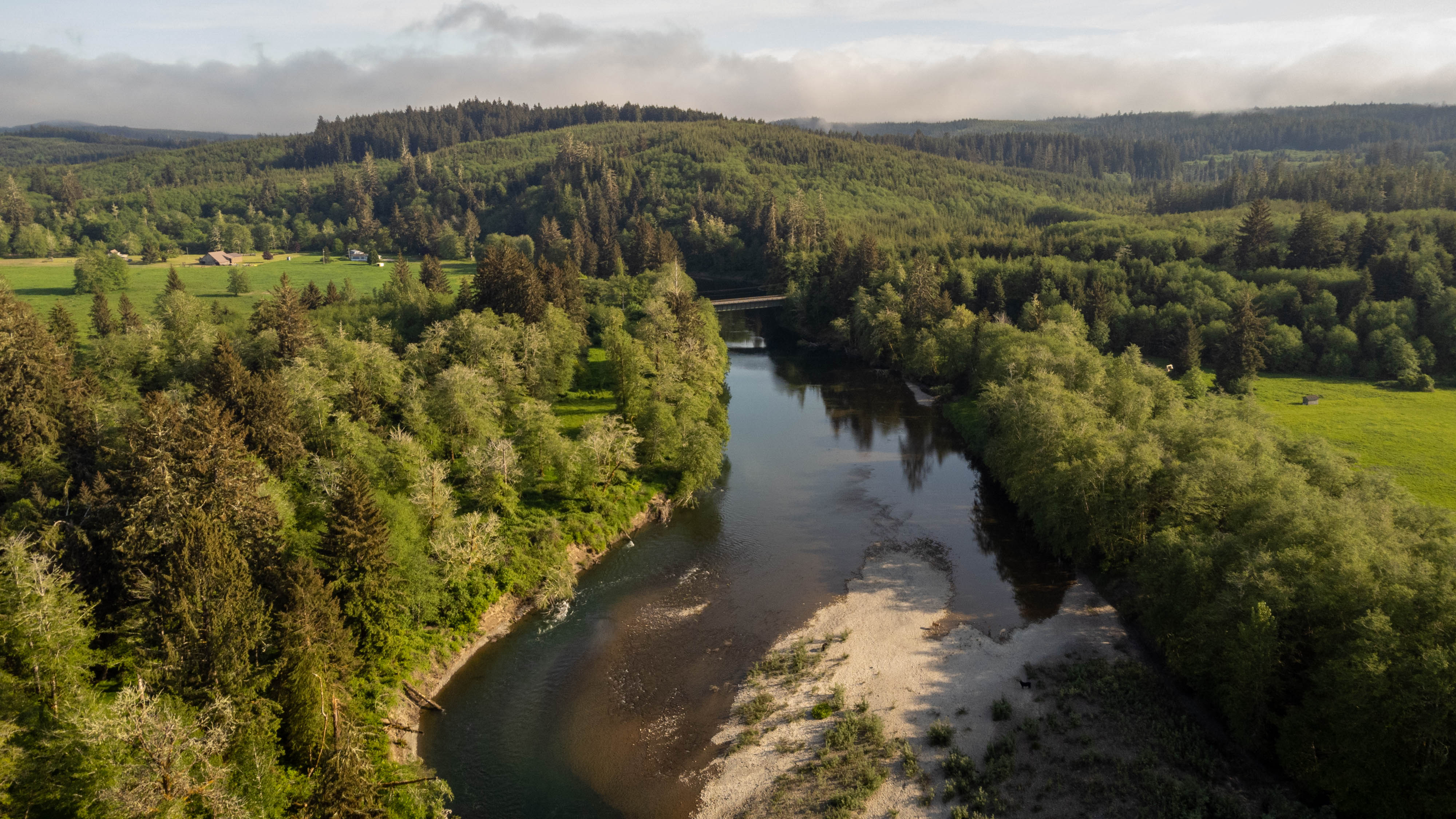
- Bogachiel River, near Forks, Washington

- Location of the mouth of the Bogachiel River in Washington Bogachiel River (the United States)
- Etymology: bo qʷa tcheel el, Quileute for "gets riley after a rain" or "muddy waters".

Location
- Country: United States
- State: Washington
- Counties: Clallam, Jefferson
- City: Forks

Physical characteristics
- Source: Bogachiel Peak
  - location: Olympic Range
  - coordinates: 47°54′19″N 123°46′56″W
  - elevation: 3,960 ft (1,210 m)
- Mouth: Quillayute River
  - coordinates: 47°54′50″N 124°23′31″W
  - elevation: 35 ft (11 m)
- Length: 50 mi (80 km)

Basin features
- Tributaries
  - right: North Fork Bogachiel River, Calawah River

The Bogachiel River (/ˈboʊɡəʃiːl/) is a river of the Olympic Peninsula in the U.S. state of Washington. It originates near Bogachiel Peak, and flows westward through the mountains of Olympic National Park. After emerging from the park it joins the Sol Duc River, forming the Quillayute River, which empties into the Pacific Ocean near La Push, Washington.

The Quillayute River system, with its main tributaries of the Bogachiel, Sol Duc, Calawah, and Dickey Rivers, drains the largest watershed on the north Olympic Peninsula.

The name "Bogachiel" is a corruption of the Quileute words bo qwa tcheel el, or /boqʷač'íʔl/, from /bó:q'ʷa/, "muddy", and /číʔlowa/, "water", meaning "gets riley [turbid] after a rain", "muddy waters", or, less likely, "big river".

The river is often regarded today as a classical instance of a lowland forest ecosystem.

A drone flight over the Bogachiel River near Forks, Washington in June 2022.

== Course ==
The Bogachiel River begins in several headwater streams near Bogachiel Peak deep in the Olympic Mountains, in the northwest part of the Olympic Peninsula. Flowing west through a densely forested valley just north of the Hoh River valley, it gathers various mountain streams, including its main tributary, the North Fork Bogachiel River.

Below the North Fork confluence, the Bogachiel River flows along the boundary between Clallam County and Jefferson County, crossing and recrossing the county line many times. After gathering many more tributaries, such as Tumwata Creek and Hades Creek, it exits Olympic National Park. Skirting the boundary of the Olympic National Forest, the river turns northwest, passing through its namesake Bogachiel State Park. U.S. Highway 101 crosses the river via a bridge, and follows the Bogachiel valley for several miles in this vicinity. Just west of the city of Forks the Calawah River joins the Bogachiel. Forks is situated between the two rivers and takes its name from the forking streams.

Below the Calawah confluence the Bogachiel River widens considerably and takes a meandering course westward through a broad valley. The Sol Duc River enters this valley from the north, and the two streams meander alongside one another for several miles before joining. The Quillayute River, formed by their confluence, flows west for only about five miles more before reaching the Pacific Ocean at La Push. In its lower reach the Quillayute River enters the coastal wilderness of Olympic National Park. The mouth of the Quillayute is contained within the Quileute Indian Reservation.

== Natural history ==
The upper Bogachiel River valley contains temperate rain forests, similar to the Hoh Rain Forest of the Hoh River valley.

== Recreation ==
A large portion of the Bogachiel River is in the wilderness of Olympic National Park. The Bogachiel Trail, beginning a few miles outside the park, follows the Bogachiel River to the North Fork Bogachiel, then follows that river valley up to the High Divide, connecting to other trails that lead north to the Sol Duc River valley and south to the Hoh River valley.

The Bogachiel River, along with the Quillayute's other tributaries, are popular for fishing. The rivers hosts healthy stocks of wild winter steelhead (the anadromous form of coastal rainbow trout) with as many as 19,000 fish returning in some years and up to 50,000 hatchery raised steelhead. The river also supports large runs of Chinook and coho salmon and holds resident populations of coastal cutthroat trout and Dolly Varden.

Unlike many other large rivers of the Olympic Peninsula, the headwaters of the Bogachiel and the other Quillayute tributaries are not glacier-fed. Although the annual snowpack in these headwaters is considerable, they do not experience the heavy summer-melt sediment loads of rivers to the south (Hoh, Queets, Quinault). This provides Bogachiel River fishermen with a longer fishing season in some years.

== See also ==
- List of Washington rivers
