= Bogachiel Peak =

Mountain in Washington (state), United States

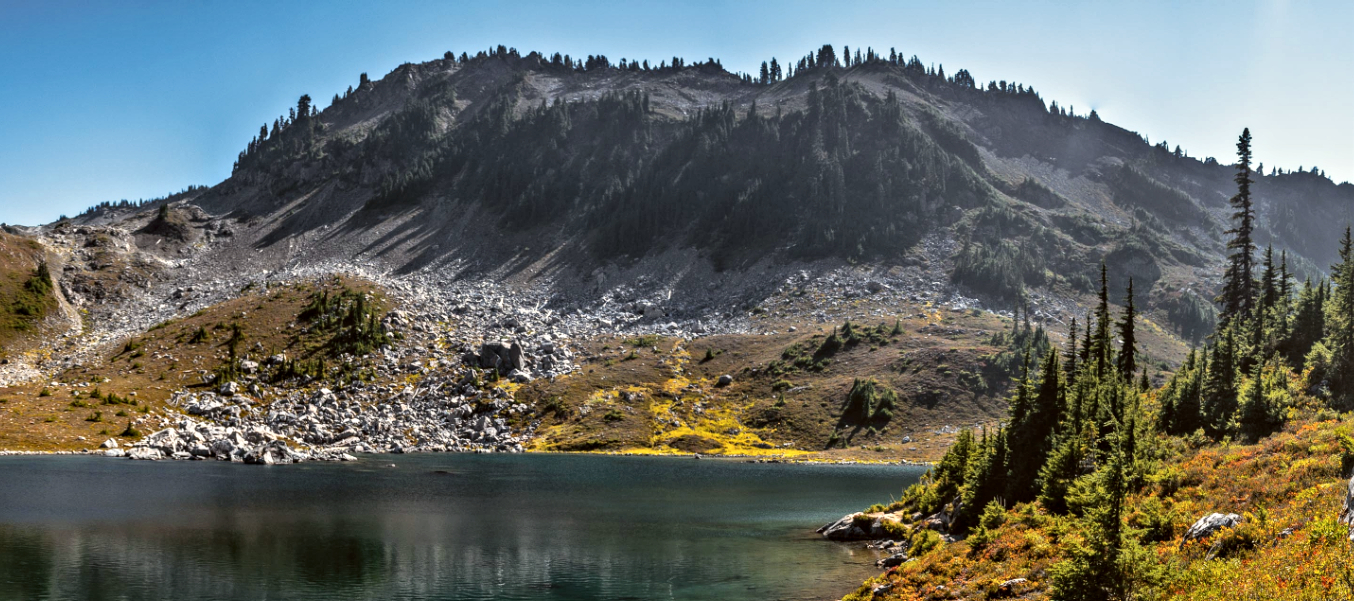
- Bogachiel Peak, northwest aspect

Highest point
- Elevation: 5,478 ft (1,670 m) NAVD 88
- Prominence: 524 ft (160 m)
- Coordinates: 47°54′19″N 123°46′39″W

Geography
- Location within Washington (state) Location within the United States
- Location: Clallam County, Washington, U.S.
- Parent range: Olympic Mountains
- Topo map: USGS Bogachiel Peak

Geology
- Rock age: Eocene

Climbing
- Easiest route: Hiking Trail

Bogachiel Peak is a 5,478-foot (1,670 m) peak in the Olympic Mountains of Washington, U.S.. It is located in Olympic National Park, and is a high point on the High Divide separating the Hoh River and Sol Duc River valleys, and forming the southern rim of Seven Lakes Basin. The peak is situated at the headwaters of the Bogachiel River. The name "Bogachiel" is a corruption of the Quileute words bo qwa tcheel el, or /boqʷač'íʔl/, from /bó:q'ʷa/, "muddy", and /číʔlowa/, "water", meaning "gets riley [turbid] after a rain", "muddy waters", or, less likely, "big river".

== Climate ==
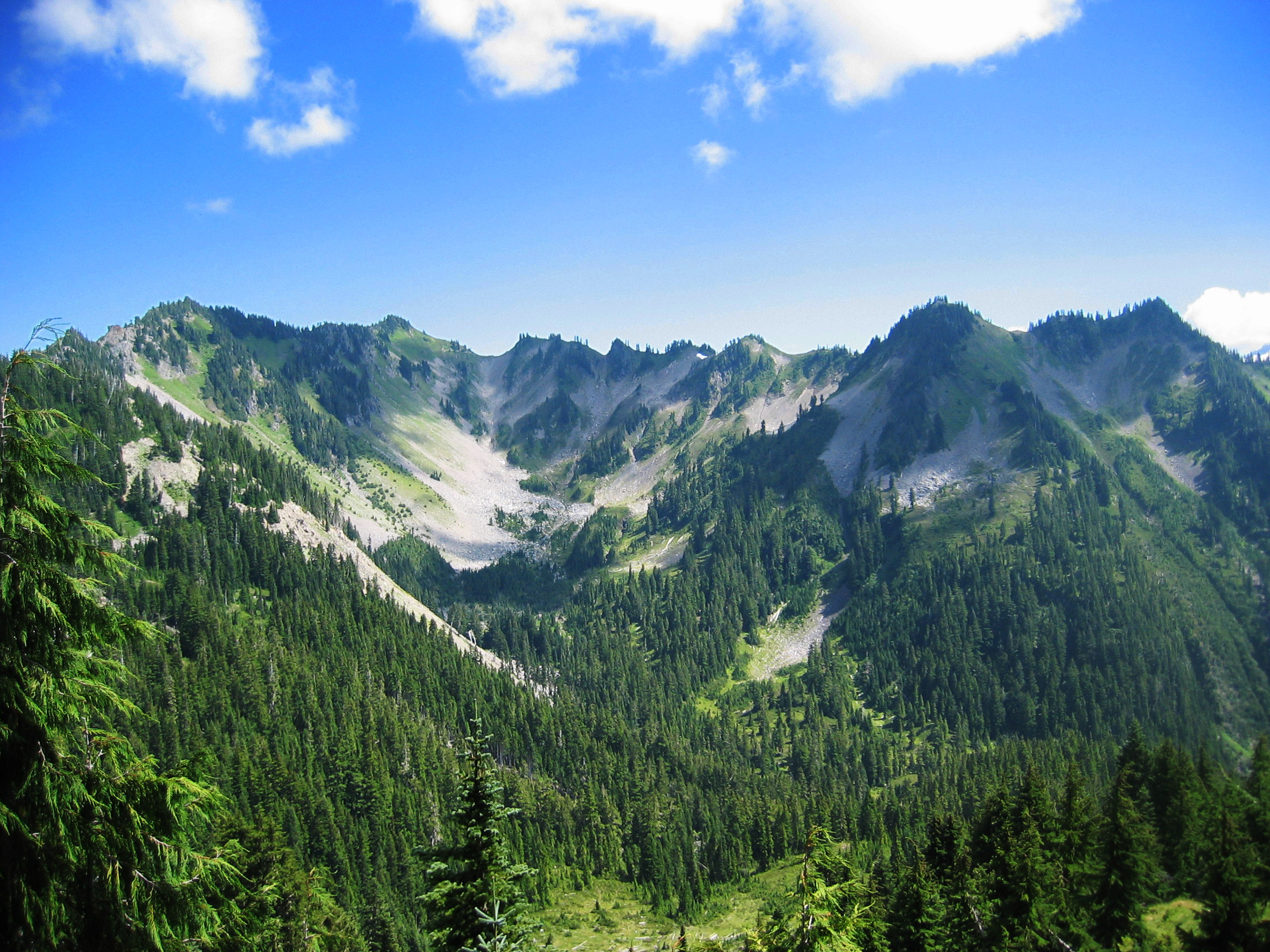
West aspect

Based on the Köppen climate classification, Bogachiel Peak is located in the marine west coast climate zone of western North America. Most weather fronts originate in the Pacific Ocean, and travel northeast toward the Olympic Mountains. As fronts approach, they are forced upward by the peaks of the Olympic Range, causing them to drop their moisture in the form of rain or snowfall (Orographic lift). As a result, the Olympics experience high precipitation, especially during the winter months. During winter months, weather is usually cloudy, but, due to high pressure systems over the Pacific Ocean that intensify during summer months, there is often little or no cloud cover during the summer. Precipitation runoff from the mountain drains into Bogachiel River, Sol Duc River, and the Hoh River.

== See also ==
- Olympic Mountains
- Geology of the Pacific Northwest
- Geography of Washington (state)
