= Forks High School =

Coordinates: 47°56′57″N 124°23′01″W

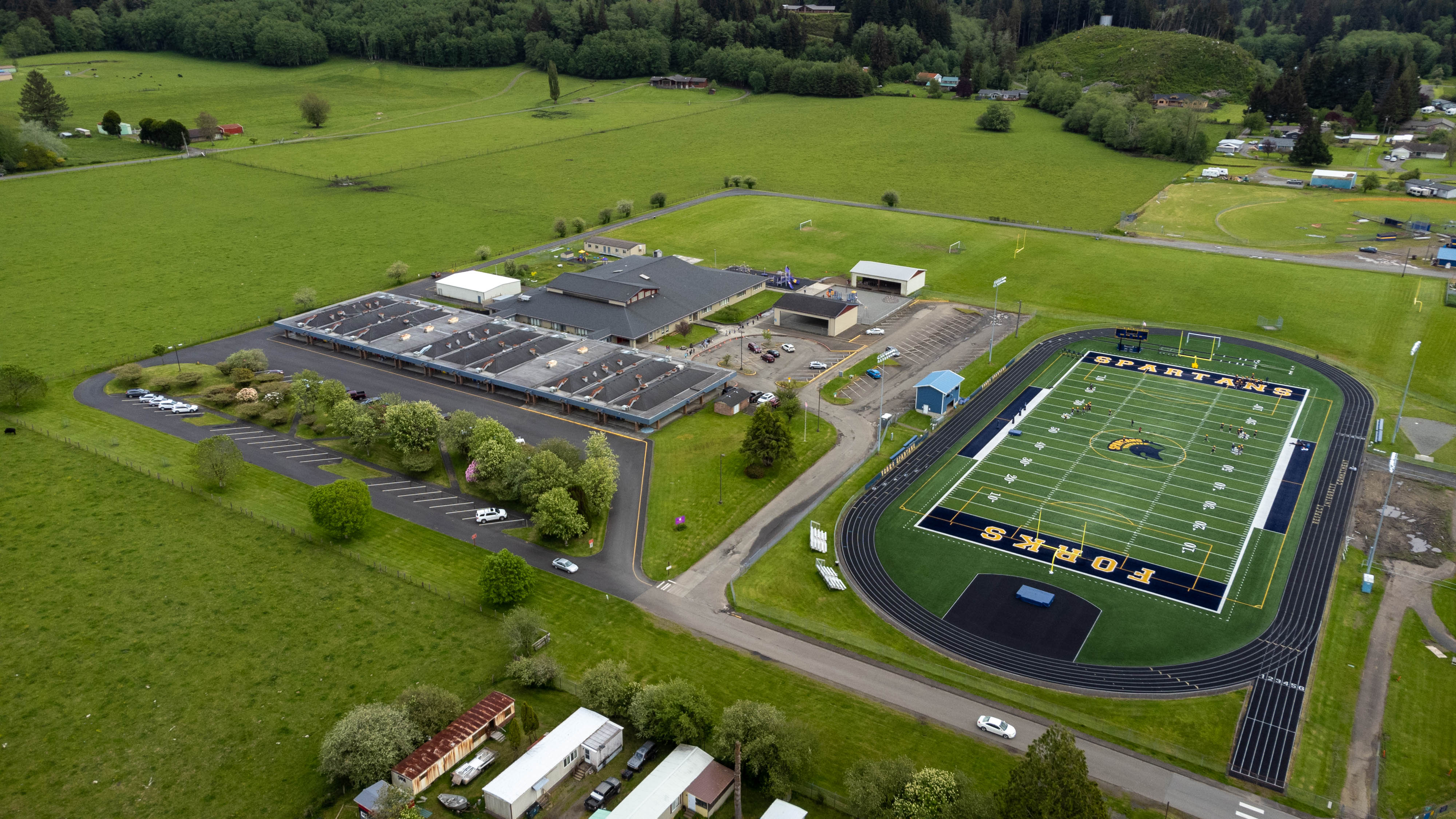
- Aerial view of the Forks High School Football field (right) and the Forks Elementary School Campus (left), 2022

Location
- 261 South Spartan Avenue; Forks, Washington; United States

Information
- Type: Public secondary
- Motto: "Home of the Spartans"
- School district: Quillayute Valley School District
- Principal: Cindy Feasel
- Faculty: 23.82 (FTE)
- Grades: 9–12
- Enrollment: 290 (2022–23)
- Student to teacher ratio: 12.17
- Colors: Navy blue and gold
- Mascot: Spartan
- Rival: Montesano Bulldogs
- Website: www.qvschools.org/o/fhs

Forks High School (FHS) is a comprehensive Washington public high school on South Spartan Avenue in the city of Forks, Washington, United States. It serves grades 9-12 in the Quillayute Valley School District. It is the only high school in the district, and is the successor to Forks Middle School. The school is governed under the authority of the Office of Superintendent of Public Instruction (OSPI) of Washington.

It has received international attention, as it was featured in the young adult novel series Twilight by Stephenie Meyer.

The current campus was built in two phases with a total cost of $25.3 million: one in 2000 and one in 2012.
