= Forks Airport =

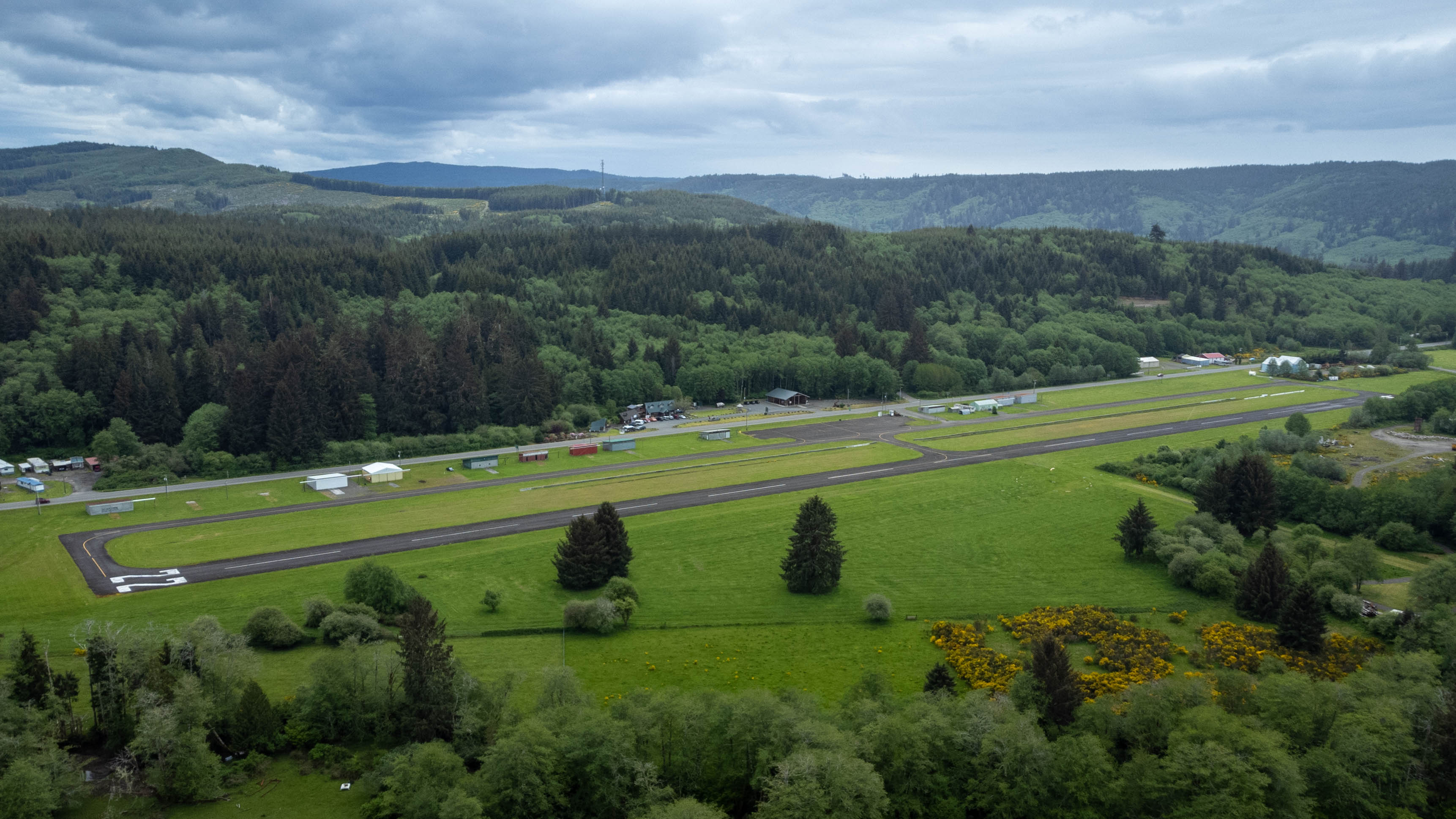
- IATA: none; ICAO: none; FAA LID: S18

Summary
- Airport type: Public
- Owner: City of Forks
- Serves: Forks, Washington
- Elevation AMSL: 299 ft (91 m)
- Coordinates: 47°56′16″N 124°23′45″W
- Interactive map of Forks Airport

Runways
Direction	Length		Surface
Direction	ft	m	Surface
4/22	2,400	732	Asphalt

Statistics (2008)
- Aircraft operations: 13,600
- Based aircraft: 10
- Source: Federal Aviation Administration

Forks Airport (FAA LID: S18) is a city-owned, public-use airport located one nautical mile (1.85 km) southwest of the central business district of Forks, a city in Clallam County, Washington, United States. It was formerly known as Forks Municipal Airport.

== Facilities and aircraft ==
Forks Airport covers an area of 72 acres (29 ha) at an elevation of 299 feet (91 m) above mean sea level. It has one runway designated 4/22 with an asphalt surface measuring 2,400 by 75 feet (732 x 23 m). It's equipped with medium intensity runway lighting. Approaches to both ends of this runway are visual.

For the 12-month period ending December 31, 2008, the airport had 13,600 aircraft operations, an average of 37 per day: 99.6% general aviation and 0.4% military. At that time there were 10 aircraft based at this airport: 50% single-engine, 30% helicopter and 20% ultralight.

== See also ==
- List of airports in Washington
