= Quillayute Valley School District =

American school district

Quillayute Valley School District 402 (QVSD) is a school district headquartered in Forks, Washington.

Its schools are: Forks Elementary School, Forks Intermediate School, Forks Junior High School, and Forks High School. Forks Alternative School is the alternative campus.

Much of the district is in Clallam County, and includes Forks and the Quileute Indian Reservation. A portion lies in Jefferson County, where it includes the Hoh Indian Reservation.
