= Beaver, Washington =

Unincorporated community in Washington, United States

- Unincorporated community
- Location of Beaver, Washington Beaver, Washington (the United States)
- Coordinates: 48°03′26″N 124°20′51″W
- Country: United States
- State: Washington
- County: Clallam
- Elevation: 413 ft (126 m)
- Time zone: UTC-8 (PST)
  - Summer (DST): UTC-7 (PDT)
- ZIP Code: 98305
- Area code(s): 360, 564
- FIPS code: 53-53009
- GNIS feature ID: 1527580
- Other names: Pleasant and Tyee

Beaver is an unincorporated community in Clallam County, Washington, United States on the Olympic Peninsula. The community lies between U.S. Route 101 and Lake Pleasant.

== Geography ==
Beaver is located on U.S. Route 101 to the north of Forks, Washington. It is situated just to the west of the boundary of the Olympic National Forest, on Lake Pleasant. Beaver is 413 feet (126 m) above sea level. A county park with a playground and boat launching facilities is located on Lake Pleasant. It is one of the wettest places in the contiguous U.S. with an annual precipitation value of 121 inches of rain.

=== Climate ===
The climate in this area has mild differences between highs and lows, and there is adequate rainfall year-round. According to the Köppen Climate Classification system, Beaver has a marine west coast climate, abbreviated "Cfb" on climate maps.
