= Mount Appleton =

Mountain in Washington (state), United States

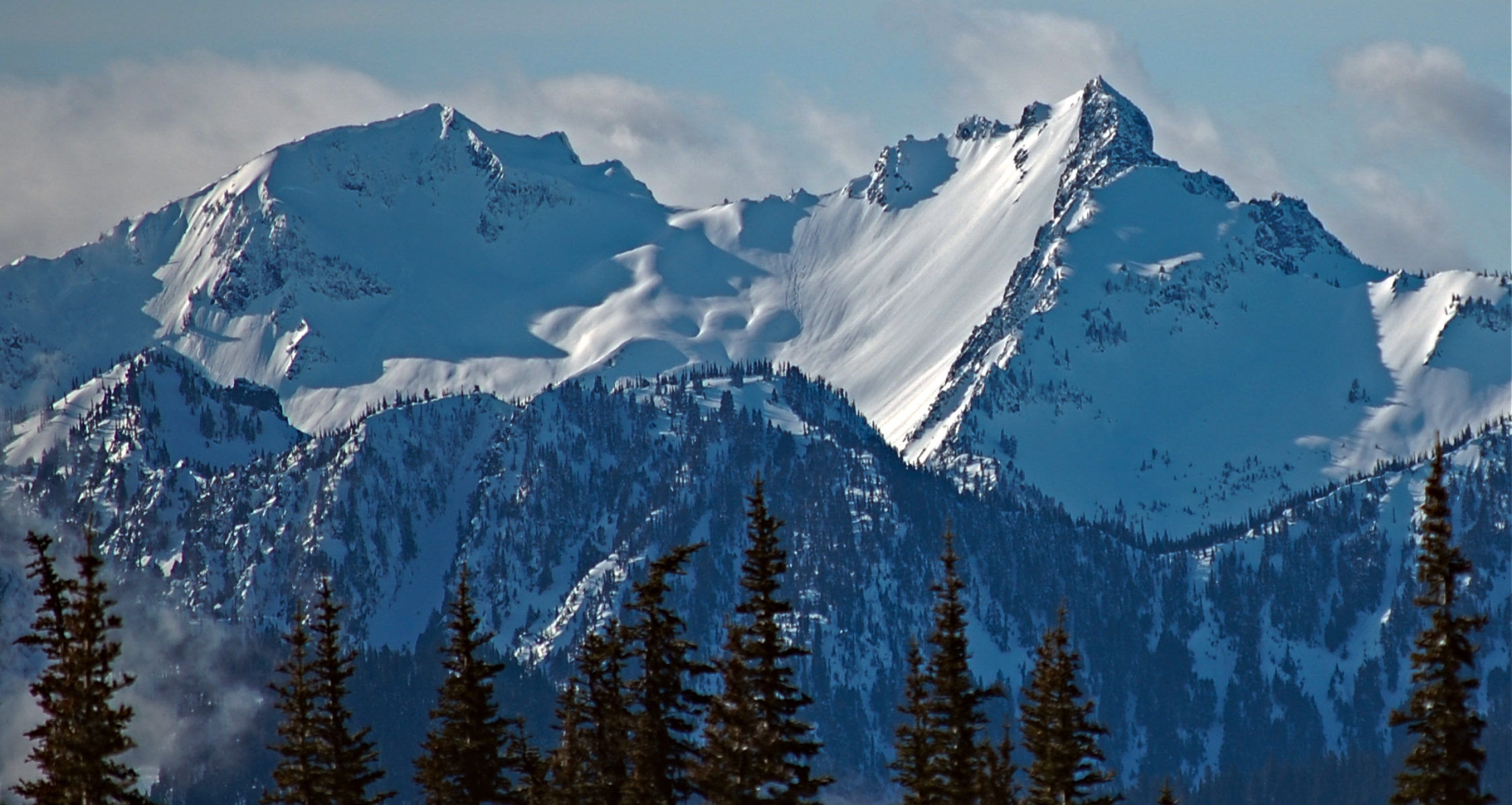
- Mount Appleton seen from Hurricane Ridge

Highest point
- Elevation: 6,017 ft (1,834 m)
- Prominence: 200 ft (61 m)
- Coordinates: 47°57′02″N 123°43′59″W

Naming
- Etymology: Thomas Joseph Appleton

Geography
- Location within Washington (state) Location within the United States
- Country: United States
- State: Washington
- County: Clallam
- Protected area: Olympic National Park
- Parent range: Olympic Mountains
- Topo map: USGS Mount Carrie

Geology
- Rock age: Eocene

Climbing
- First ascent: Unknown
- Easiest route: class 3 scrambling

Mount Appleton is a 6,017-foot (1,834 m) double summit mountain located in the Olympic Mountains, in Clallam County of Washington state. It is set within Olympic National Park and is situated northwest of Appleton Pass. The nearest higher neighbor is South Appleton (6,100+ ft), 0.33 mi (0.53 km) to the south. Precipitation runoff from Mount Appleton drains into the Sol Duc River, and Boulder Creek which is a tributary of the Elwha River, thence to the Strait of Juan de Fuca. Topographic relief is significant as the summit rises 3,000 feet (914 meters) above the Sol Duc River in 1.5 mile (2.4 km).

== Geology ==
The Olympic Mountains are composed of obducted clastic wedge material and oceanic crust, primarily Eocene sandstone, turbidite, and basaltic oceanic crust. The mountains were sculpted during the Pleistocene era by erosion and glaciers advancing and retreating multiple times.

== Climate ==
Set in the northwest portion of the Olympic Mountains, Mount Appleton is located in the marine west coast climate zone of western North America. Most weather fronts originating in the Pacific Ocean travel northeast toward the Olympic Mountains. As fronts approach, they are forced upward by the peaks (orographic lift), causing them to drop their moisture in the form of rain or snow. As a result, the Olympics experience high precipitation, especially during the winter months in the form of snowfall. Because of maritime influence, snow tends to be wet and heavy, resulting in high avalanche danger. During winter months weather is usually cloudy, but due to high pressure systems over the Pacific Ocean that intensify during summer months, there is often little or no cloud cover during the summer.

== Etymology ==
Mount Appleton was so named to honor Dr. Thomas Joseph Appleton (1863–1942), who moved to Port Angeles, Washington, from the state of Michigan, circa 1897. He was a pioneering physician who made house calls in some of the most rural parts of Clallam County and was the first white doctor to treat Native Americans in this area. Appleton was also an eloquent speaker and published author. Later, he was a three-term mayor of Port Angeles before he died in 1942.

== See also ==
- Geology of the Pacific Northwest
- Geography of Washington (state)

== Gallery ==
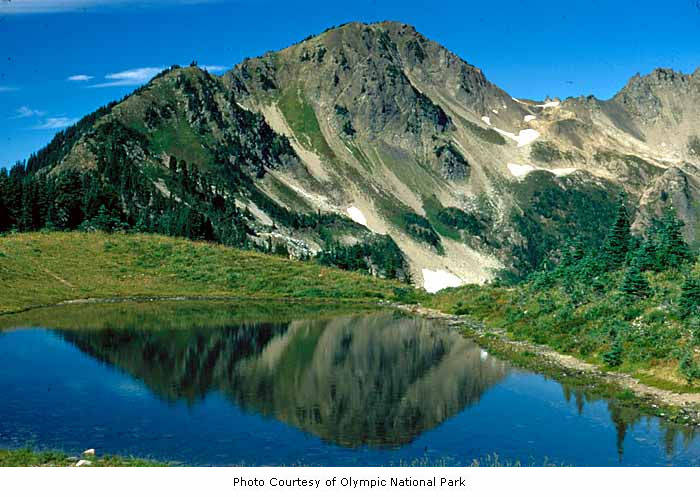
South Appleton reflected in Oyster Lake

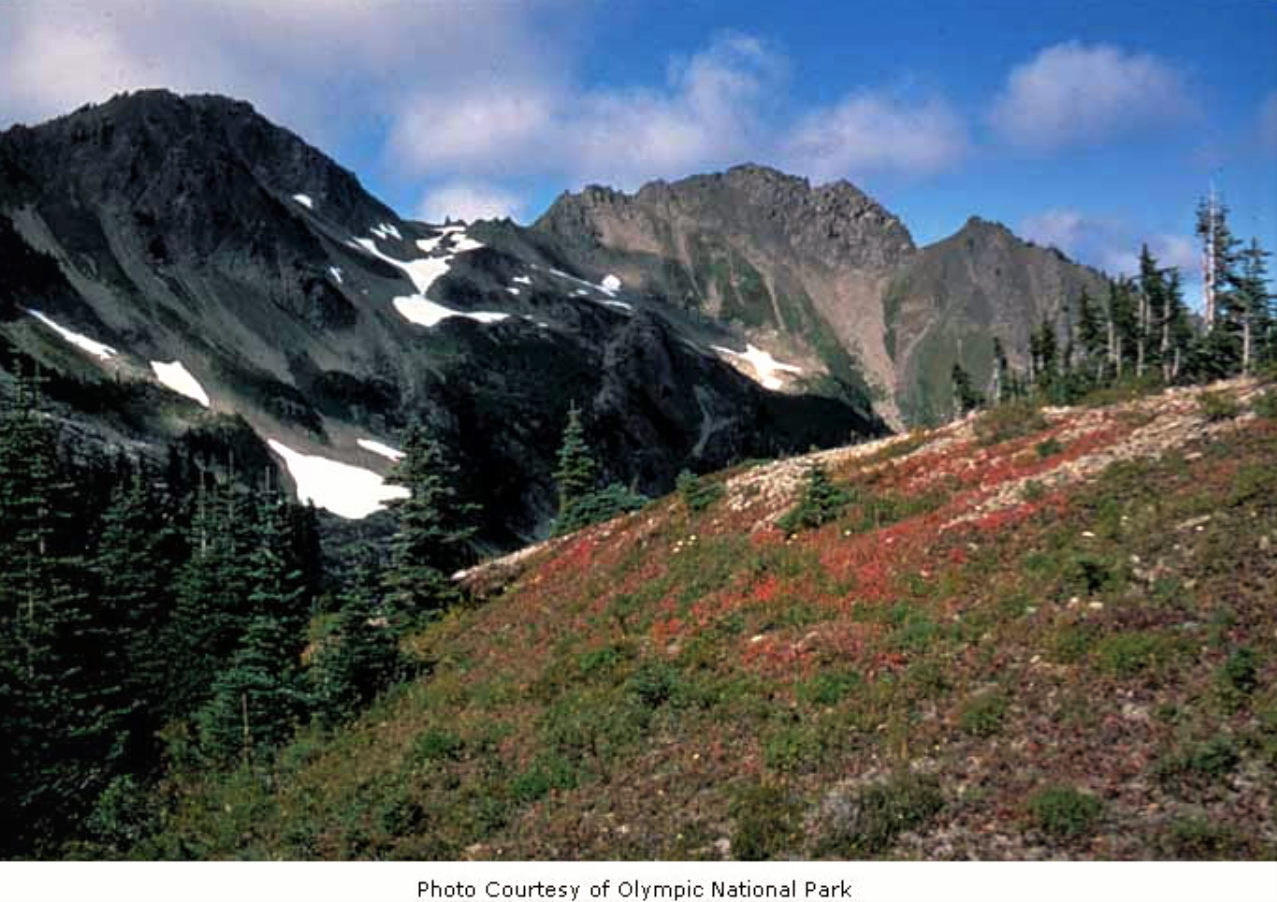
Mount Appleton

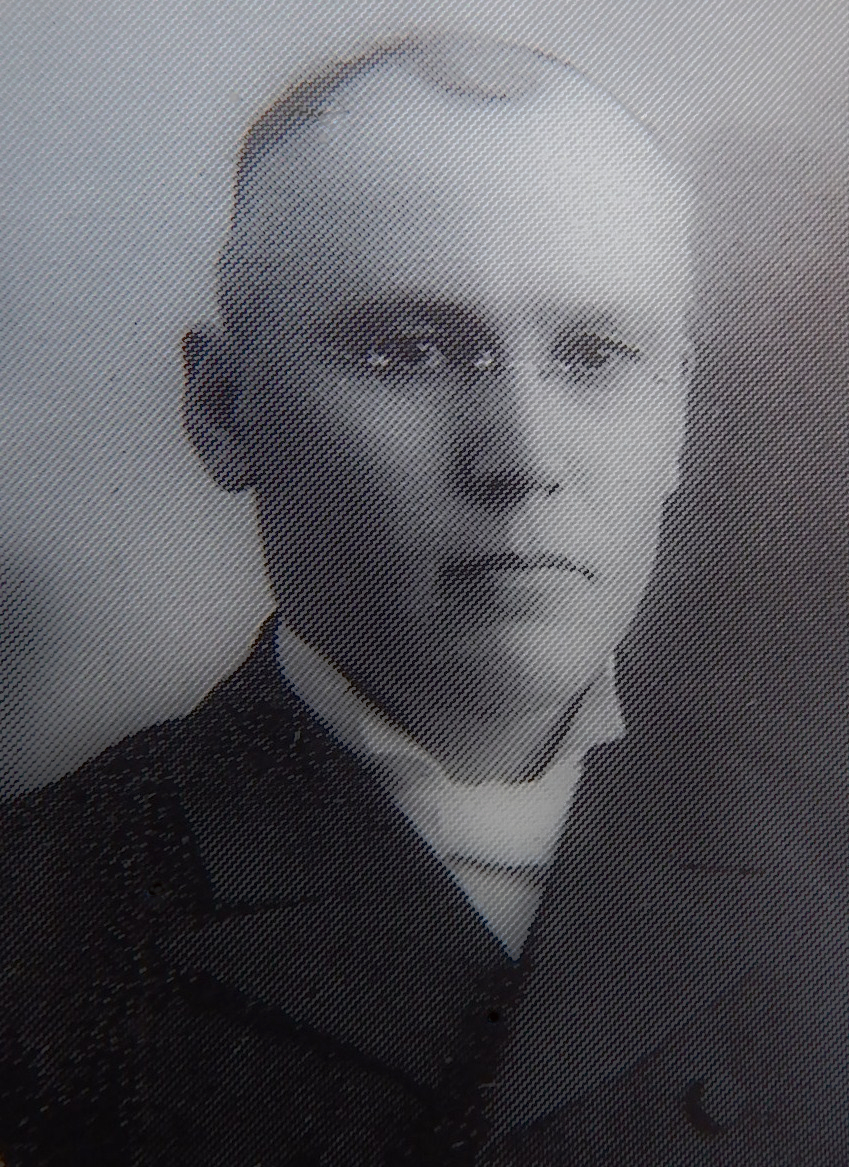
T. J. Appleton
