= Forks, Washington =

- City
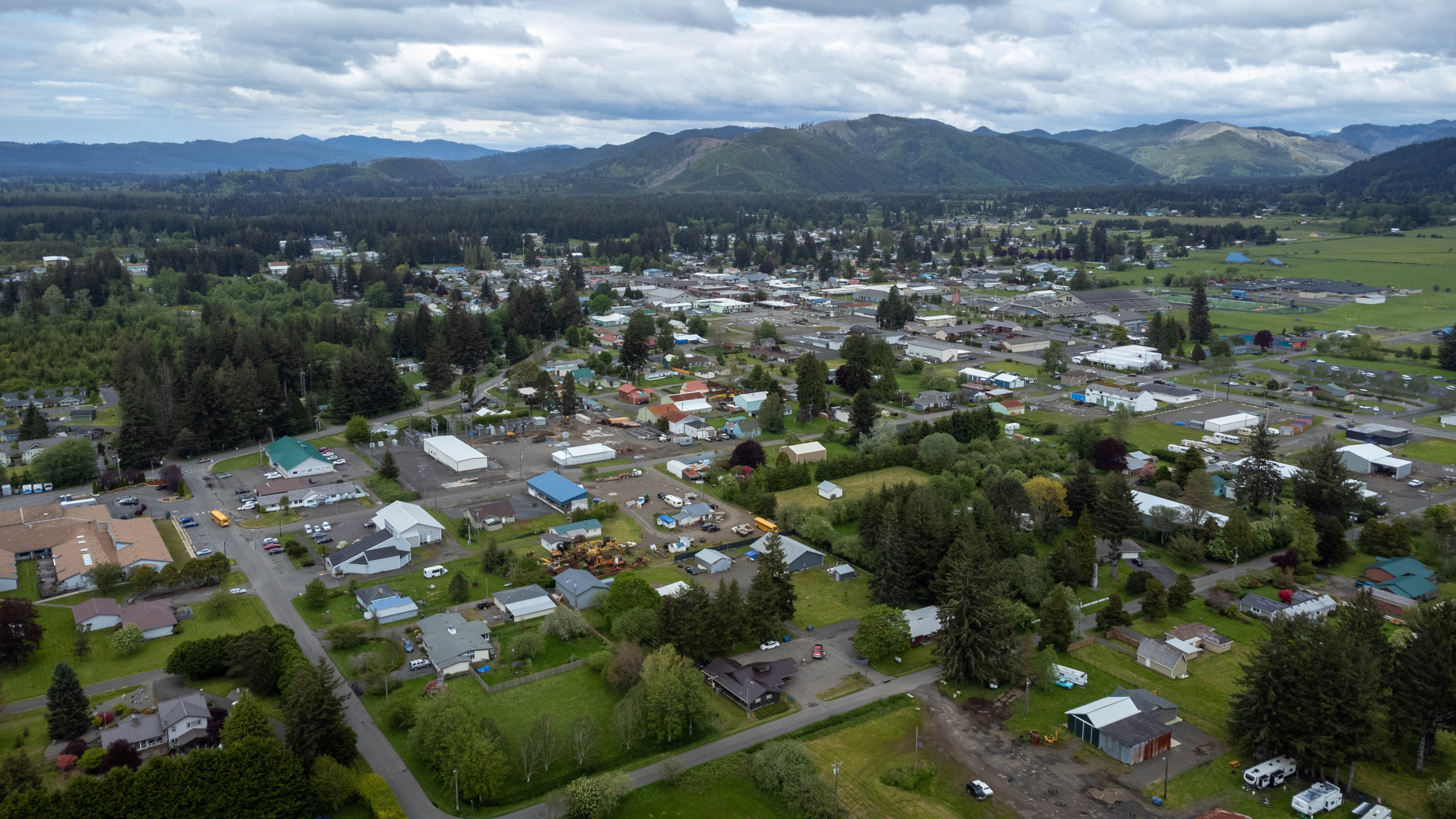
- Aerial view of Forks

- Seal
- Nickname: Logging Capital of the World
- Location in the state of Washington

- Location within Washington (state)
- Coordinates: 47°57′01″N 124°23′08″W
- Country: United States
- State: Washington
- County: Clallam
- Incorporated: August 7, 1945

Government
  - Type: Mayor–council
  - Mayor: Tim Fletcher

Area
  - Total: 4.12 sq mi (10.67 km^{2})
  - Land: 4.12 sq mi (10.67 km^{2})
  - Water: 0 sq mi (0.00 km^{2})
- Elevation: 305 ft (93 m)

Population (2020)
  - Total: 3,335
  - Density: 810/sq mi (312.6/km^{2})
- Time zone: UTC-8 (PST)
  - Summer (DST): UTC-7 (PDT)
- ZIP Code: 98331
- Area code: 360, 564
- FIPS code: 53-24810
- GNIS feature ID: 2410520
- Website: forkswashington.org

Forks, also previously known as the unincorporated town of Quillayute, is a town in southwest Clallam County, Washington, United States. The population was 3,335 at the 2020 census. It is named after the forks in the nearby Bogachiel, Calawah, and Sol Duc rivers which join to form the Quillayute River.

For much of the 20th century, the city's economy was fueled by the local timber industry. Forks later became a tourism destination for visitors to Olympic National Park, recreational sport fishing in nearby rivers, and fans of the novel series Twilight and films, which are set in Forks. The town is also near the Clallam Bay Corrections Center and Olympic Corrections Center.

== History ==
=== Indigenous settlement ===
Forks was once inhabited by the Quileute Native American tribe, before they ceded their territory. In 1889, a reservation was created near Forks; that same year the village was burnt down by settler Daniel Pullen. Forks is 12 miles (19 km) from tribal burning areas that the tribes used to regenerate young ferns. The phrase "prairie upstream" from the Quileute language was translated and became the name Forks Prairie.

=== Early settlement ===
The first European American settlers in the modern-day Forks Prairie arrived in the 1860s by following the waterways in and around the Olympic Peninsula due to a lack of overland trails. A proposal to create Quillehuyte County from the western sides of Clallam and Jefferson counties was accepted by the territorial legislature in 1868 but dissolved a year later. The first homestead on the prairie was claimed in January 1878 by Luther and Esther Ford. Their 160-acre (65 ha) property included the first dairy in the area, set up in 1879, and was later joined by other homesteads. In 1884, a post office opened in the cabin of Ole Nelson, a local trapper, and was named "Forks"; their preferred name "Ford's Prairie" had already been taken by another settlement in the territory. The name "Forks" was chosen for the forks of three nearby rivers.

Rudimentary trails and roads were built by settlers in the 1880s and 1890s to create trade routes; the nearest markets were in Port Townsend and later Port Angeles, but the seasonal supply boats were unable to take large cargo. Timber around the prairie was cleared by settlers and small-time loggers in the late 19th century. They were followed by timber companies, including Merrill & Ring around the Pysht River in 1916, until the Olympic Forest Reserve was established in 1897 by the federal government. The forest reserve was gradually reduced in size but later contributed most of the land for Olympic National Monument (now Olympic National Park), which was established in 1909, and the Olympic National Forest. Logging of non-federal land continued, but slowed during the 1907 national recession. The U.S. Army sought to use the region's Sitka spruce to construct airplanes during World War I and built a 36-mile (58 km) railroad to Port Angeles to aid in transport; the railroad was not used due to the end of the war.

The Mora post moved to Forks in the early 1890s which consisted of a general store, hardware store, and a hotel. In the early 1900s, hop growing declined and the Forks Cooperative Creamery was established which operated for 70 years. The town of Forks was platted in 1912 on the homestead of Merrill Whittier, a hop farmer. It served as the economic center of the area between the Hoh River and Quillayute Prairie but only had a single block of buildings in its first decade. A fire on January 10, 1925, destroyed six buildings on the west side of the town; they were replaced later in the year along with plans for a new high school and social halls. A new road passable for automobiles opened from Lake Crescent to Forks in 1927 and was replaced by the Olympic Loop Highway (US 101) in 1931. Another fire on Main Street in 1930 caused further damage.

=== Modern history ===
Forks was officially incorporated on August 7, 1945, following an election of the constituents who would become its first town members.

The local timber industry boomed from the 1950s to 1970s, earning Forks the self-proclaimed title of "Logging Capital of the World." Changes in environmental policy led to a significant decline in the timber industry in the 1980s and 1990s. Timber harvesting is still part of the local economy, but at levels far below the peak of the 1970s.

The city gained popularity for being a key setting in Stephenie Meyer's Twilight series (2005 to 2008) and related film adaptations (2008 to 2012).

== Demographics ==
=== Racial and ethnic composition ===
Forks, Washington – Racial and ethnic composition Note: the US Census treats Hispanic/Latino as an ethnic category. This table excludes Latinos from the racial categories and assigns them to a separate category. Hispanics/Latinos may be of any race.
Race / Ethnicity (NH = Non-Hispanic)	Pop 2000	Pop 2010	Pop 2020	% 2000	% 2010	% 2020
White alone (NH)	2,372	2,237	2,113	76.03%	63.34%	63.36%
Black or African American alone (NH)	13	15	16	0.42%	0.42%	0.48%
Native American or Alaska Native alone (NH)	124	175	182	3.97%	4.95%	5.46%
Asian alone (NH)	47	42	47	1.51%	1.19%	1.41%
Native Hawaiian or Pacific Islander alone (NH)	5	2	8	0.16%	0.06%	0.24%
Other race alone (NH)	1	4	15	0.03%	0.11%	0.45%
Mixed race or Multiracial (NH)	73	143	194	2.34%	4.05%	5.82%
Hispanic or Latino (any race)	485	914	760	15.54%	25.88%	22.79%
Total	3,120	3,532	3,335	100.00%	100.00%	100.00%

Historical population
Census	Pop.	Note	%±
1950	1,120		—
1960	1,156		3.2%
1970	1,680		45.3%
1980	3,060		82.1%
1990	2,862		−6.5%
2000	3,120		9.0%
2010	3,532		13.2%
2020	3,335		−5.6%
U.S. Decennial Census; 2015 Estimate

=== 2020 census ===
As of the 2020 census, Forks had a population of 3,335. The median age was 36.0 years. 27.5% of residents were under the age of 18 and 14.8% of residents were 65 years of age or older. For every 100 females there were 95.7 males, and for every 100 females age 18 and over there were 93.8 males age 18 and over.

0.0% of residents lived in urban areas, while 100.0% lived in rural areas.

There were 1,296 households in Forks, of which 37.2% had children under the age of 18 living in them. Of all households, 40.7% were married-couple households, 19.8% were households with a male householder and no spouse or partner present, and 29.2% were households with a female householder and no spouse or partner present. About 30.8% of all households were made up of individuals and 12.0% had someone living alone who was 65 years of age or older.

There were 1,407 housing units, of which 7.9% were vacant. The homeowner vacancy rate was 1.5% and the rental vacancy rate was 6.1%.

Racial composition as of the 2020 census
Race	Number	Percent
White	2,210	66.3%
Black or African American	16	0.5%
American Indian and Alaska Native	273	8.2%
Asian	48	1.4%
Native Hawaiian and Other Pacific Islander	8	0.2%
Some other race	453	13.6%
Two or more races	327	9.8%
Hispanic or Latino (of any race)	760	22.8%

=== 2010 census ===
As of the 2010 census, there were 3,532 people, 1,264 households, and 849 families residing in the city. The population density was 967.7 inhabitants per square mile (373.6/km^{2}). There were 1,374 housing units at an average density of 376.4 per square mile (145.3/km^{2}). The racial makeup of the city was 67.7% White, 0.5% African American, 6.6% Native American, 1.2% Asian, 0.1% Pacific Islander, 18.1% from other races, and 5.9% from two or more races. Hispanic or Latino people of any race were 25.9% of the population.

There were 1,264 households, of which 40.9% had children under the age of 18 living with them, 46.0% were married couples living together, 13.5% had a female householder with no husband present, 7.7% had a male householder with no wife present, and 32.8% were non-families. 25.3% of all households were made up of individuals, and 8.2% had someone living alone who was 65 years of age or older. The average household size was 2.72 and the average family size was 3.16.

The median age in the city was 31.3 years. 29.2% of residents were under the age of 18; 10.3% were between the ages of 18 and 24; 27.6% were from 25 to 44; 23.2% were from 45 to 64; and 9.7% were 65 years of age or older. The gender makeup of the city was 51.5% male and 48.5% female.

== Geography and climate ==
The city lies on Forks Prairie just east of the confluence of the Calawah River with the Bogachiel River. U.S. Route 101 passes through the town. The Olympic rainforest surrounds the town.

Forks has an oceanic climate (Cfb) in a temperate rainforest with high rainfall, above 100 inches (2,500 mm) per year. Although there is a drying trend in summer, rain is still abundant, just not as wet as the rest of the year. Forks averages 212 days per year with measurable precipitation.

According to the United States Census Bureau, the city has a total area of 3.65 square miles (9.45 km^{2}), all of it land.

Climate data for Forks, Washington (1991–2020 normals, extremes 1907–present)
Month	Jan	Feb	Mar	Apr	May	Jun	Jul	Aug	Sep	Oct	Nov	Dec	Year
Record high °F (°C)	67 (19)	75 (24)	81 (27)	85 (29)	96 (36)	110 (43)	101 (38)	102 (39)	100 (38)	88 (31)	73 (23)	65 (18)	110 (43)
Mean maximum °F (°C)	55.4 (13.0)	59.8 (15.4)	66.0 (18.9)	72.8 (22.7)	81.2 (27.3)	84.5 (29.2)	88.2 (31.2)	88.5 (31.4)	83.6 (28.7)	71.8 (22.1)	58.6 (14.8)	54.1 (12.3)	93.0 (33.9)
Mean daily maximum °F (°C)	46.9 (8.3)	49.9 (9.9)	53.3 (11.8)	58.7 (14.8)	64.5 (18.1)	68.0 (20.0)	73.1 (22.8)	74.0 (23.3)	70.1 (21.2)	60.0 (15.6)	50.6 (10.3)	45.6 (7.6)	59.6 (15.3)
Daily mean °F (°C)	40.7 (4.8)	42.0 (5.6)	44.4 (6.9)	48.3 (9.1)	53.6 (12.0)	57.5 (14.2)	61.6 (16.4)	62.3 (16.8)	58.8 (14.9)	51.2 (10.7)	44.0 (6.7)	39.8 (4.3)	50.4 (10.2)
Mean daily minimum °F (°C)	34.6 (1.4)	34.0 (1.1)	35.6 (2.0)	37.9 (3.3)	42.7 (5.9)	47.0 (8.3)	50.2 (10.1)	50.5 (10.3)	47.4 (8.6)	42.4 (5.8)	37.5 (3.1)	34.0 (1.1)	41.2 (5.1)
Mean minimum °F (°C)	23.3 (−4.8)	24.3 (−4.3)	26.6 (−3.0)	29.5 (−1.4)	33.5 (0.8)	39.4 (4.1)	42.9 (6.1)	43.1 (6.2)	38.0 (3.3)	31.2 (−0.4)	25.2 (−3.8)	23.4 (−4.8)	19.8 (−6.8)
Record low °F (°C)	3 (−16)	8 (−13)	12 (−11)	21 (−6)	25 (−4)	30 (−1)	34 (1)	34 (1)	24 (−4)	21 (−6)	8 (−13)	3 (−16)	3 (−16)
Average precipitation inches (mm)	19.10 (485)	11.69 (297)	14.31 (363)	9.43 (240)	4.96 (126)	3.69 (94)	2.05 (52)	2.77 (70)	4.77 (121)	11.71 (297)	18.07 (459)	17.39 (442)	119.94 (3,046)
Average snowfall inches (cm)	3.1 (7.9)	1.3 (3.3)	0.5 (1.3)	0.1 (0.25)	0.0 (0.0)	0.0 (0.0)	0.0 (0.0)	0.0 (0.0)	0.0 (0.0)	0.0 (0.0)	1.0 (2.5)	1.9 (4.8)	7.9 (20.05)
Average precipitation days (≥ 0.01 in)	23.0	20.2	23.2	20.4	15.9	15.7	10.2	9.4	11.5	18.7	23.2	23.7	215.1
Average snowy days (≥ 0.1 in)	1.6	0.9	0.8	0.2	0.0	0.0	0.0	0.0	0.0	0.0	0.6	1.0	5.1
Source 1: NOAA
Source 2: National Weather Service

Climate data for Quillayute Airport, Washington (1991–2020 normals, (Note: Mean monthly maxima and minima (i.e. the highest and lowest temperature readings during an entire month or year) calculated based on data at said location from 1991 to 2020.) extremes 1966–present)
Month	Jan	Feb	Mar	Apr	May	Jun	Jul	Aug	Sep	Oct	Nov	Dec	Year
Record high °F (°C)	69 (21)	73 (23)	80 (27)	84 (29)	92 (33)	110 (43)	97 (36)	99 (37)	97 (36)	84 (29)	69 (21)	64 (18)	110 (43)
Mean maximum °F (°C)	57.5 (14.2)	60.1 (15.6)	64.3 (17.9)	70.7 (21.5)	77.7 (25.4)	80.7 (27.1)	84.5 (29.2)	86.7 (30.4)	81.9 (27.7)	72.2 (22.3)	59.8 (15.4)	55.4 (13.0)	90.6 (32.6)
Mean daily maximum °F (°C)	47.5 (8.6)	49.1 (9.5)	51.2 (10.7)	54.8 (12.7)	60.0 (15.6)	63.3 (17.4)	67.6 (19.8)	68.9 (20.5)	66.7 (19.3)	58.7 (14.8)	51.2 (10.7)	46.7 (8.2)	57.1 (14.0)
Daily mean °F (°C)	41.7 (5.4)	42.1 (5.6)	43.9 (6.6)	46.9 (8.3)	51.7 (10.9)	55.5 (13.1)	59.3 (15.2)	60.0 (15.6)	57.1 (13.9)	50.6 (10.3)	44.7 (7.1)	41.0 (5.0)	49.5 (9.8)
Mean daily minimum °F (°C)	35.9 (2.2)	35.2 (1.8)	36.7 (2.6)	38.9 (3.8)	43.4 (6.3)	47.7 (8.7)	51.0 (10.6)	51.1 (10.6)	47.5 (8.6)	42.4 (5.8)	38.1 (3.4)	35.3 (1.8)	41.9 (5.5)
Mean minimum °F (°C)	23.1 (−4.9)	23.8 (−4.6)	26.7 (−2.9)	29.7 (−1.3)	33.5 (0.8)	39.5 (4.2)	42.9 (6.1)	43.1 (6.2)	37.6 (3.1)	31.7 (−0.2)	25.6 (−3.6)	23.3 (−4.8)	19.7 (−6.8)
Record low °F (°C)	7 (−14)	11 (−12)	19 (−7)	23 (−5)	29 (−2)	33 (1)	38 (3)	36 (2)	28 (−2)	23 (−5)	5 (−15)	7 (−14)	5 (−15)
Average precipitation inches (mm)	15.59 (396)	9.73 (247)	11.78 (299)	8.11 (206)	4.25 (108)	3.30 (84)	1.58 (40)	2.64 (67)	4.56 (116)	10.68 (271)	15.26 (388)	13.84 (352)	101.32 (2,574)
Average snowfall inches (cm)	2.0 (5.1)	2.6 (6.6)	0.7 (1.8)	0.1 (0.25)	0.0 (0.0)	0.0 (0.0)	0.0 (0.0)	0.0 (0.0)	0.0 (0.0)	0.0 (0.0)	1.4 (3.6)	2.1 (5.3)	8.9 (22.65)
Average precipitation days (≥ 0.01 in)	22.2	18.9	22.2	19.2	15.0	14.5	9.0	8.8	11.1	17.8	21.9	22.5	203.1
Average snowy days (≥ 0.1 in)	1.7	1.9	0.8	0.4	0.0	0.0	0.0	0.0	0.0	0.0	0.9	1.3	7.0
Average relative humidity (%)	88.5	86.4	84.4	81.2	80.3	80.3	79.9	82.3	82.5	87.0	88.9	90.0	84.3
Mean monthly sunshine hours	55.4	80.3	115.0	147.4	170.6	167.8	209.7	194.8	173.2	112.7	55.3	48.1	1,530.3
Percentage possible sunshine	20	28	31	36	36	35	43	44	46	34	20	18	34
Source: NOAA (snow/snow days 1981–2010)

== Government ==
The city is organized under Washington State law as a non-charter code city. Its structure is that of an elected mayor and a five-member elected city council. Unlike other cities on the Olympic Peninsula, Forks operates under what is called a "strong mayor" form of government with the mayor being the chief executive officer overseeing four department heads (clerk/treasurer, public works, police, and legal/planning).

== Transportation ==
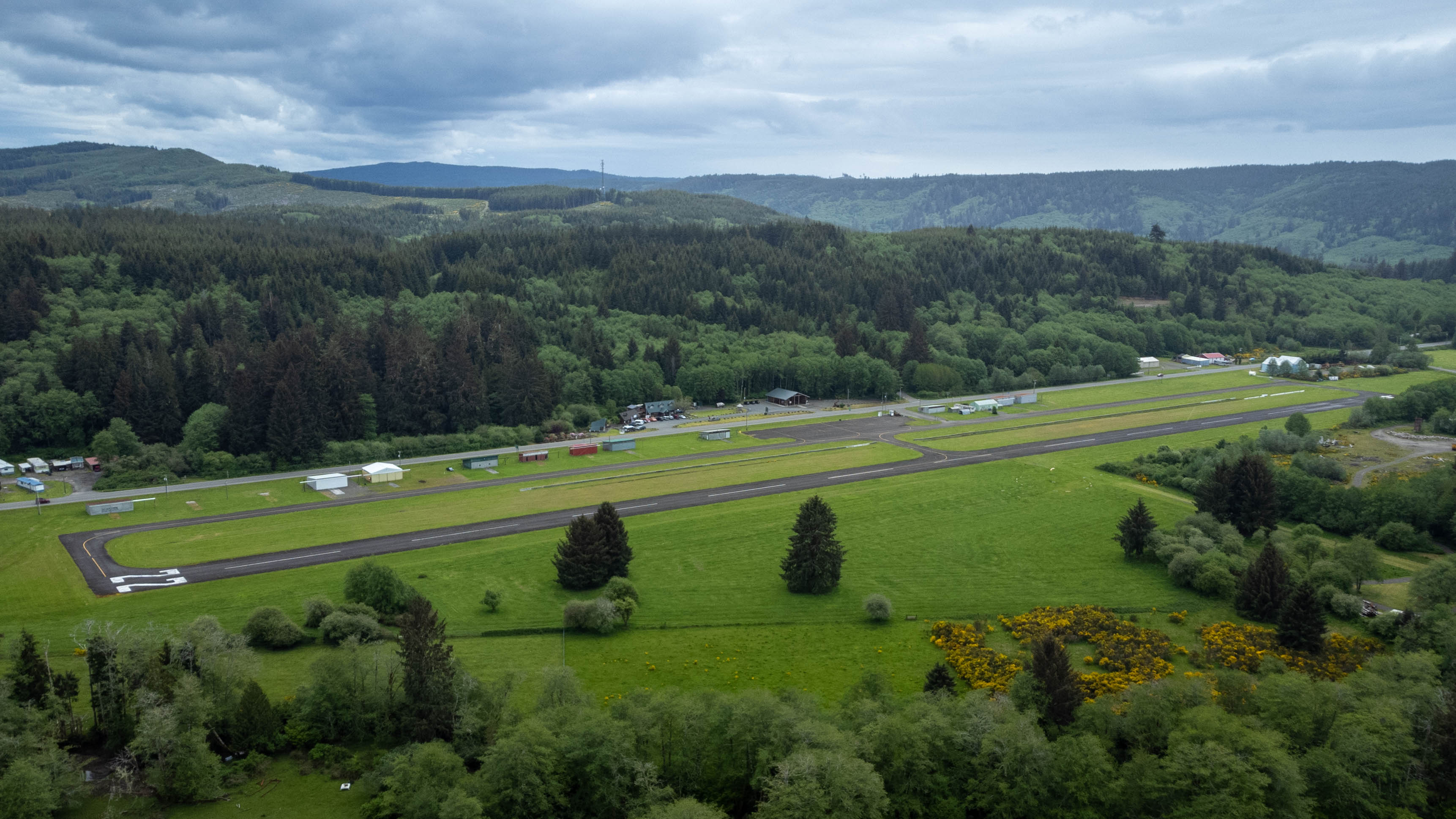
Aerial view of Forks Municipal Airport

The city is served by U.S. Route 101, which connects the western Olympic Peninsula to Port Angeles, Olympia, and Aberdeen. Another highway, State Route 110, connects Forks to La Push on the coast.

Forks Municipal Airport (FAA LID: S18) is located in Clallam County, 1 mile (1.6 km) southwest of Forks. The airport has six based aircraft, including three single-engine aircraft and three helicopters. The latest available data indicate that the airport had a total of 13,550 annual operations. Runway 4-22 is Forks Municipal Airport's sole runway. This runway is 2,400 feet (730 m) long, 75 feet (23 m) wide, is equipped with medium intensity runway lighting, and has an asphalt surface. Approaches to both ends of this runway are visual.

Forks is served by two public transit agencies. Clallam Transit operates local service in Forks, including an on-demand microtransit system, as well as intercity routes to Port Angeles, La Push, and Neah Bay. The "Olympic Connection" bus, operated by Jefferson Transit, travels between Forks and Lake Quinault, where passengers are able to transfer to Grays Harbor Transit buses to Aberdeen. The Olympic Connection was introduced in January 1995 to fill a 60-mile (97 km) gap in transit service along the U.S. Route 101 corridor.

== Media ==
Newspapers serving Forks include the Peninsula Daily News and the weekly Forks Forum, known as "the farthest west newspaper in the contiguous United States."

KBDB-FM 96.7, owned by Forks Broadcasting, is the only local commercial station serving the area. KNWU 91.5, a satellite station of Washington State University's statewide Northwest Public Radio network, is the public radio station serving the area.

== Education ==
Forks is a part of the Quillayute Valley School District, with Forks High School being the community's high school. Forks is home to the University of Washington's Olympic Natural Resources Center.

== Economy and tourism ==
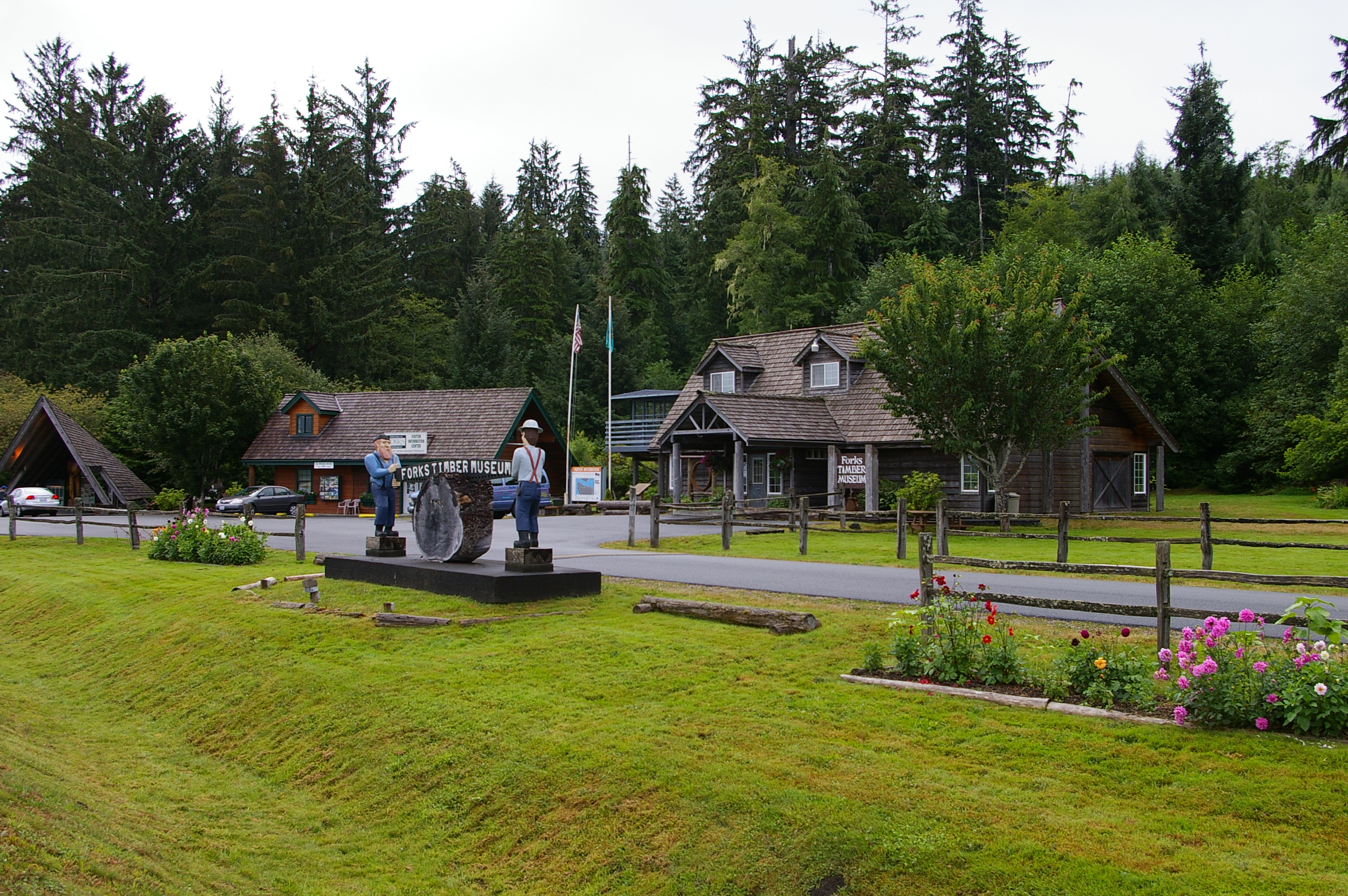
Forks Timber Museum

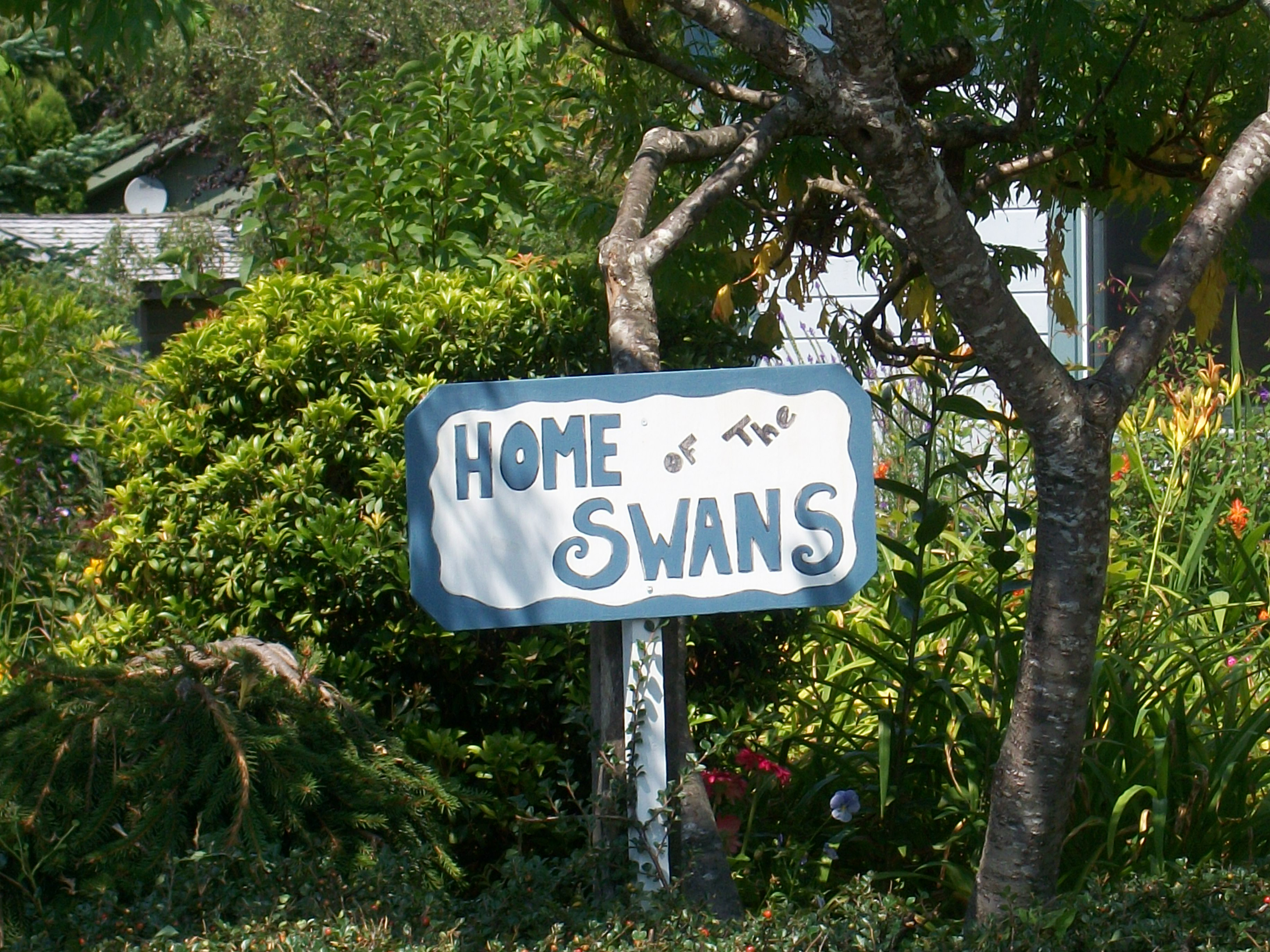
Signs related to the Twilight book/movie series that is set in Forks

In 2003, an executive on the economic development council noted that 'Forks is going through a transition from a logging community to a tourist community'.

On the south end of town is the Forks Timber Museum. Constructed in 1989 by the Forks High School carpentry class, the 3,200-square-foot (300 m^{2}) building provides a look into the local history of the timber industry, loggers of the past, and their tools of the trade. The museum has exhibits depicting local history dating to the 1870s.

Forks serves as the hub for numerous day excursions to the Hoh Rainforest, the Pacific Beaches, and various wilderness trails. Forks is well known for its winter steelhead fishing with the Quillayute river system – the Hoh, Sol Duc, Bogachiel and Calawah rivers. Other nearby Clallam, Sekiu, and Hoko rivers are also good for king salmon fishing and steelheading as well. Local guides are available for both native and hatchery runs and for float trips. Fishing gear and clothing is available at local stores.

Another source of tourism is Stephenie Meyer's Twilight series, which she set in the town after searching Google for rainy settings. Tours are available of locations that resemble the places described in Meyer's books. The majority of the films were not shot in Forks, though key scenes were shot in the town and surrounding area.

In December 2005, 74 visitors signed the guest book at the Forks Visitor Center; after the release of the Twilight series this increased substantially, with 2540 visitors signing in to the center in December 2009. In July of that year, the number was 16,186. The average annual number of tourists visiting the town rose from 6,000 before Twilight to 18,000 in 2008, the year of the first film, and nearly 73,000 by 2010.

== Tillicum Park ==
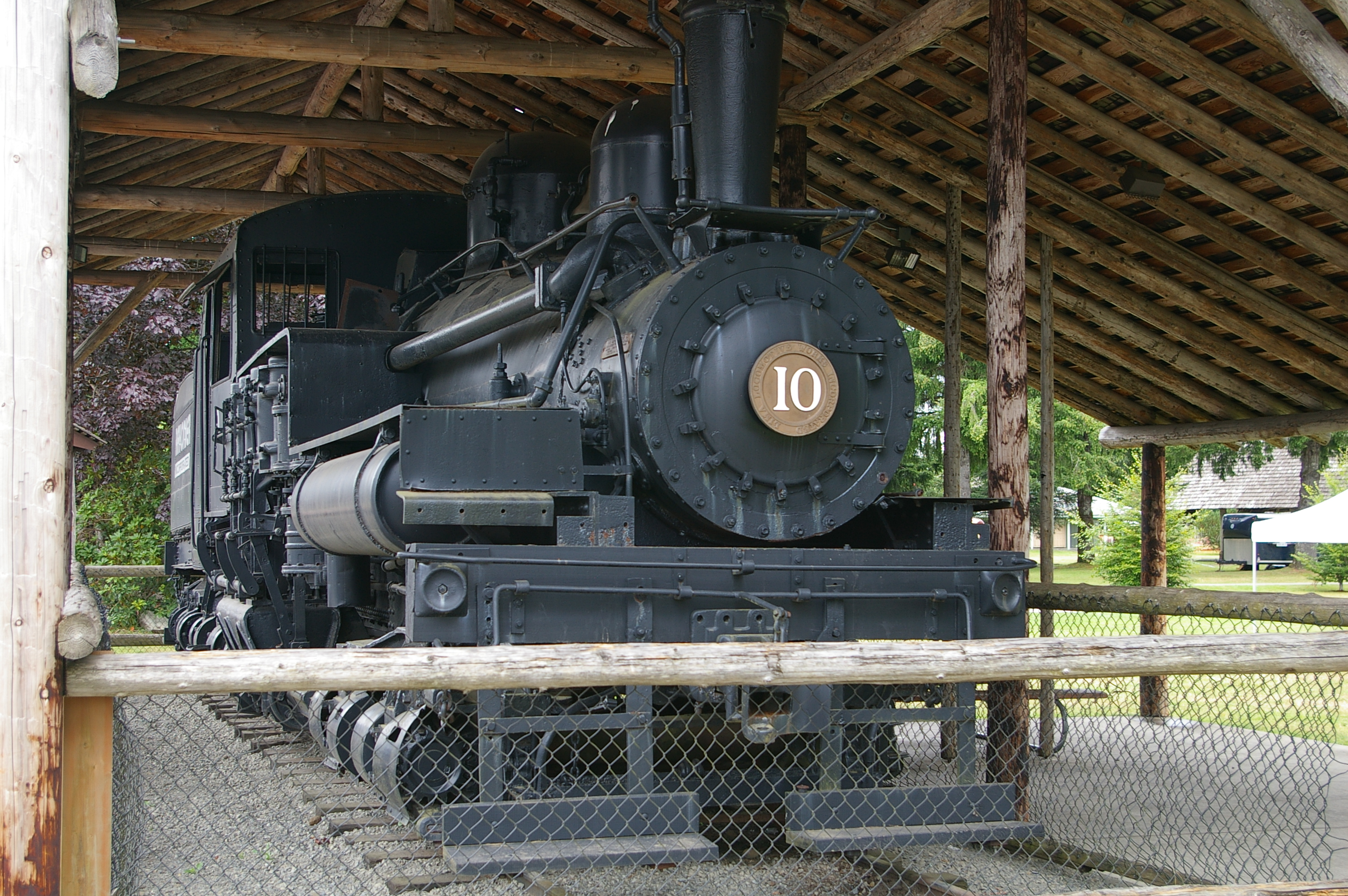
Forks Shay Engine

Forks displays one of a few Shay engines remaining in Washington. Shay locomotives are unusual in that they have a crank shaft running down the side, powering all wheels. They were designed to be used to transport lumber out of forests. Rayonier #10 (c/n 3348) was built for stock by Lima in 1930. It has three cylinders and three trucks. The Ozette Timber Company bought it 11 years later. In 1945 it was acquired by Rayonier for their lumber operation near Forks. It was retired near the north end of Forks in Tillicum Park in 1959.

The Forks Lions Club erected an attractive shelter over the #10 in 1999. It has also built and maintained most of the structures in the Shay Tillicum Park over the last 40 years.

== Community events ==
Rainfest, a celebration of the arts sponsored by the West Olympic Council for the Arts, takes place in April. It includes a combination of arts and craft related events. In recent years quilt classes and a quilt show have been sponsored by the Piece Makers Quilt Club.

In March every year, the Quillayute Valley Scholarship Auction takes place. This annual fundraising event raises tens of thousands of dollars for scholarships. Since the first scholarship award in 1964, to Robert Henry (now D.D.S.), the committee has awarded over US$1m in scholarships to Forks students.

In the summer, Forks hosts its traditional "Old Fashioned Fourth of July" celebration with a Grand Fourth of July Parade. The numerous events include a demolition derby and fireworks display. July is also the month for Quileute Days at La Push with its parade, traditional salmon bake, bone games, softball tournament, canoe races, and street fair. In August, the Forks Family Festival combines arts and crafts vendors with children's activities.

In late September, the Forks Chamber of Commerce partners with the Quileute Tribe and the City of Forks to host the Last Chance Fishing Derby at La Push; cash prizes are offered to those wanting to fish for salmon on the Pacific Ocean. The first week in October is when the community celebrates its heritage during Heritage Days. One of the more celebrated events during this week-long festival is the "Old Timers Round Table;" this is a moderated conversation broadcast live via the local radio station, featuring longtime residents of the region talking about days long past.

The Forks City Council passed a resolution in 2007 celebrating Stephenie Meyer Day in honor of the Twilight young adult novels and film series, set for September 13, the day of the fictional Bella's birthday. In 2015, the event was still driving tourism, with visitor numbers peaking in 2010, then settling to 50% more than before the Twilight phenomenon. Stephenie Meyer Day has since been replaced with the Forever Twilight in Forks Festival which is still celebrated annually on the week of September 13. The festival includes a movie marathon, a blood drive, and dance lessons.

== See also ==
- Cape Flattery
- Olympic Animal Sanctuary (2006–2013)
- Olympic Mountains
