= Rialto Beach =

Beach in Olympic National Park, Washington

- Beach
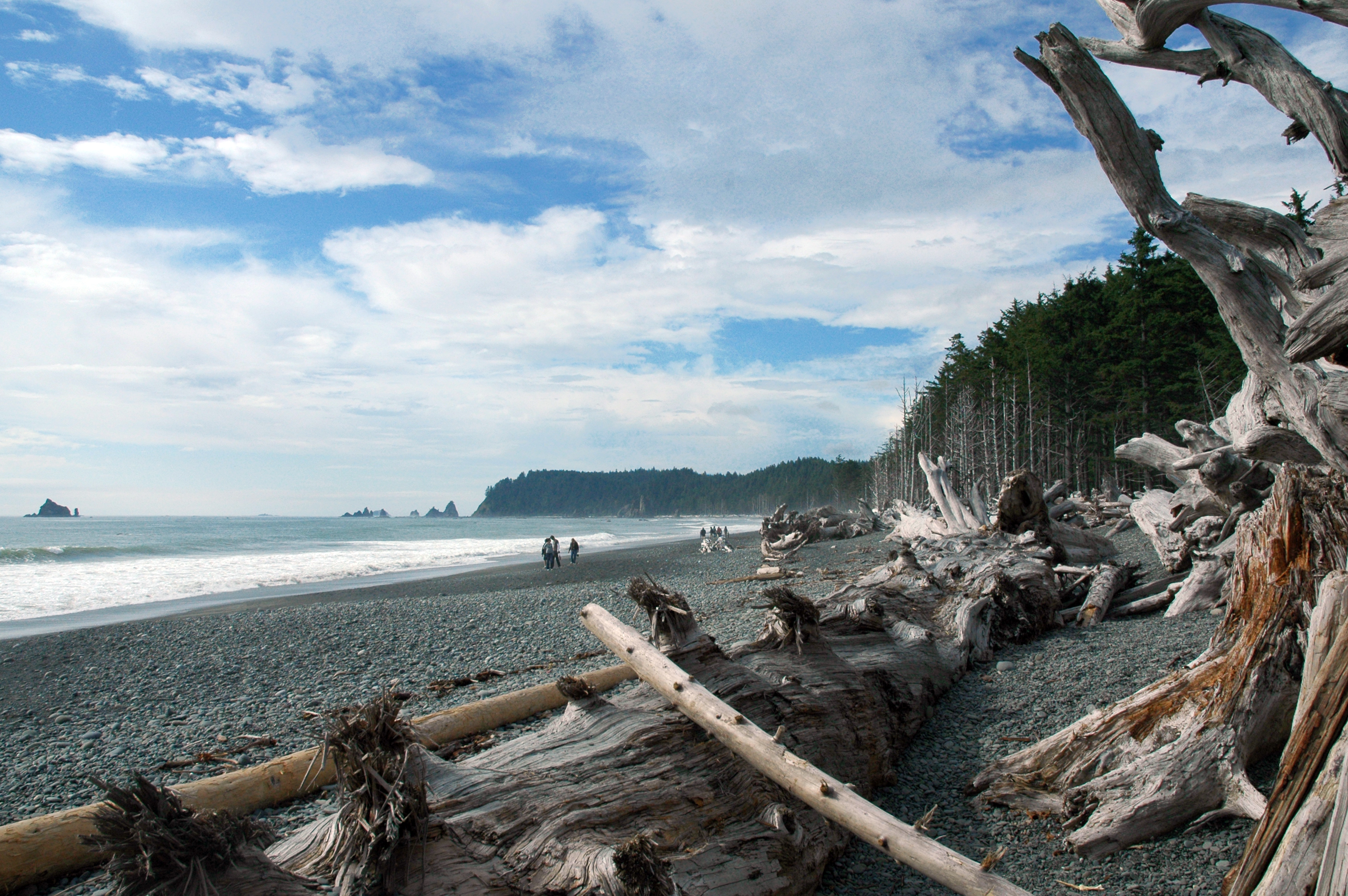
- Interactive map of Rialto Beach
- Coordinates: 47°54′30″N 124°38′32″W
- Location: Clallam County, Washington, United States

Rialto Beach is a public beach located on the Pacific Ocean in Washington state. It is adjacent to Mora Campground in the Olympic National Park near the mouth of the Quillayute River, and is composed of an ocean beach and coastal forest. The many miles of seaside topography offer views of sea stacks and rock formations in the Pacific Ocean.

Rialto Beach is north of the Quillayute River. To the south of the river is La Push Beach.

The beach was named "Rialto" by the famous magician Claude Alexander Conlin after the Rialto theater chain. Conlin had a home in the 1920s at Mora, overlooking the beach and ocean, until it burned in the 1930s leaving no trace as of 1967.

Rialto Beach also features a tree graveyard, with hundreds of tree trunks deposited by storms.

== Hole-in-the-Wall ==
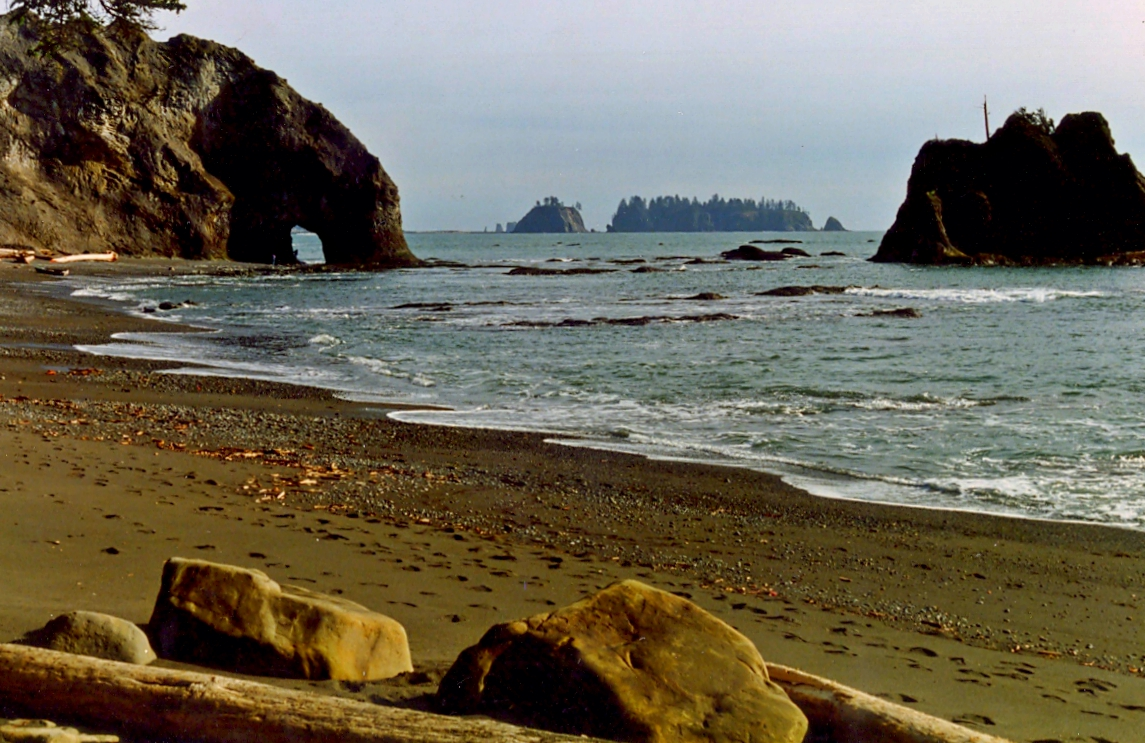
Hole-in-the-Wall can be seen on the left side of the image.

Hole-in-the-Wall is a rock arch near Rialto Beach, and is a popular attraction. It was formed by erosion from the sea surf and waves.
