= Quillayute River =

River on the Olympic Peninsula in Washington

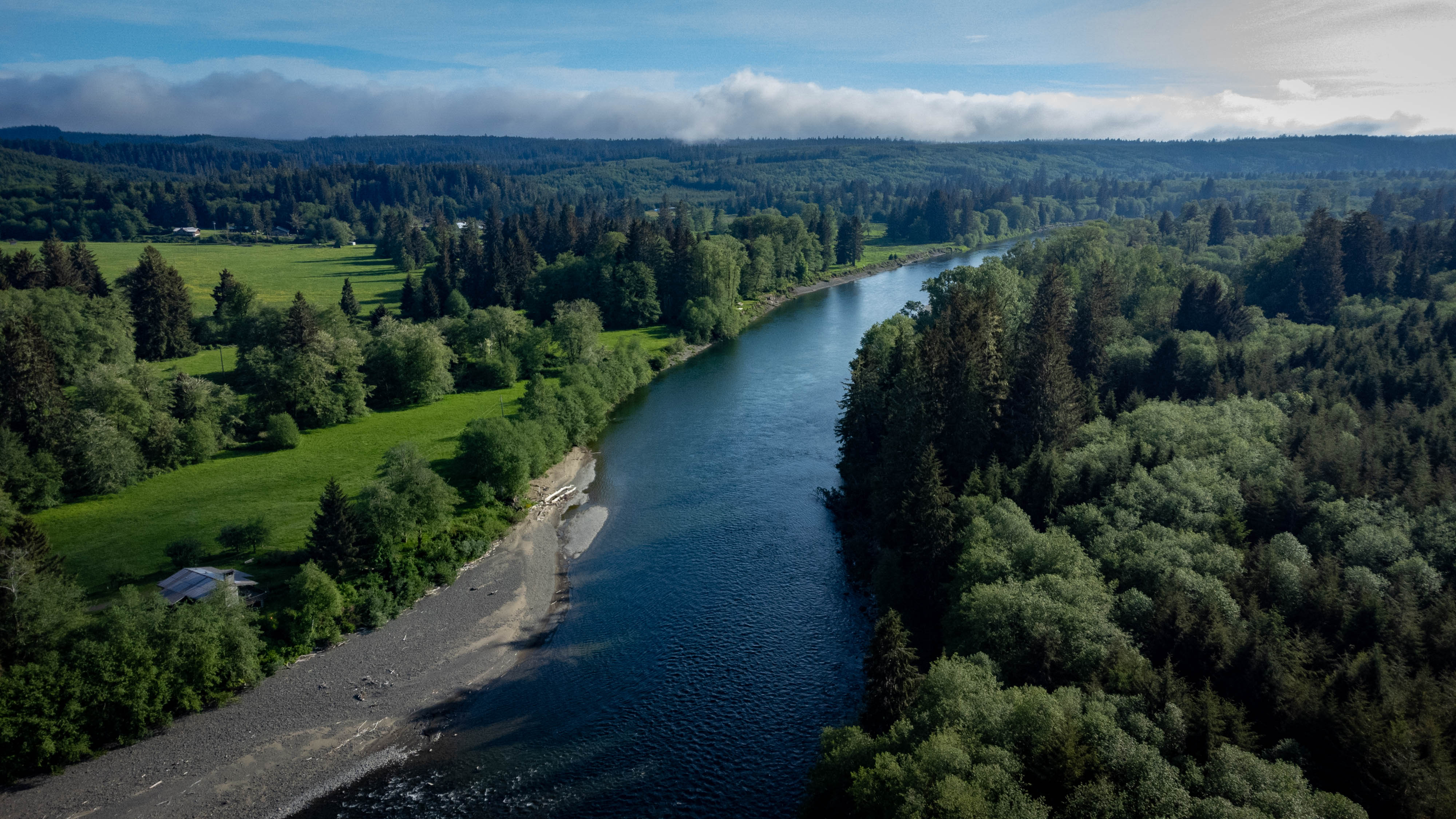
- The Quillayute River looking south-west near Forks, Washington.

- Location of the mouth of the Quillayute River in Washington

Location
- Country: United States
- State: Washington
- County: Clallam

Physical characteristics
- Source: Olympic Mountains
  - coordinates: 47°54′50″N 124°32′31″W
- Mouth: Pacific Ocean
  - coordinates: 47°54′30″N 124°38′32″W
  - elevation: 0 ft (0 m)

The Quillayute River (also spelled Quileute River) is a river situated on the Olympic Peninsula in Washington. It empties to the Pacific Ocean at La Push, Washington. The Quillayute River is formed by the confluence of the Bogachiel River, Calawah River and the Sol Duc River near the town of Forks, WA. The Dickey River joins the Quillayute from the north, just above the river's mouth at the Pacific Ocean.

Although the Quillayute is one of the main rivers on the Olympic Peninsula and has a large drainage area, due to an unusual naming arrangement it is officially very short, being only about 4 miles (6.4 km) long. At the confluence of the Sol Duc and Bogachiel rivers the use of the Quillayute name ends, although these source rivers continue far into the interior of the Olympic Mountains.

The name "Quillayute" comes from the Quileute people. In the Quileute language the name is /kʷoʔlíːyot'/, which perhaps derived from /kʷolíː/ ("wolves"), and was the name of a village at La Push.

The Quillayute River is the current, traditional, and ancestral center of the territory of the Quileute Native Tribe, which before European settlement occupied the entire drainage basin (plus that of the Hoh River). Presently the natives live at the town of La Push on their small treaty reservation which adjoins the south shore of the river at the mouth.

The final 2 to 3 miles (3.2 to 4.8 km) at the mouth of the Quillayute pass through the narrow coastal strip of the Olympic National Park. Park roads lead to the Mora Campground and Rialto Beach recreation area on the north side of the Quillayute. There are camping and picnicking facilities, public parking, and trailhead access to the coastal wilderness strip north of the river.

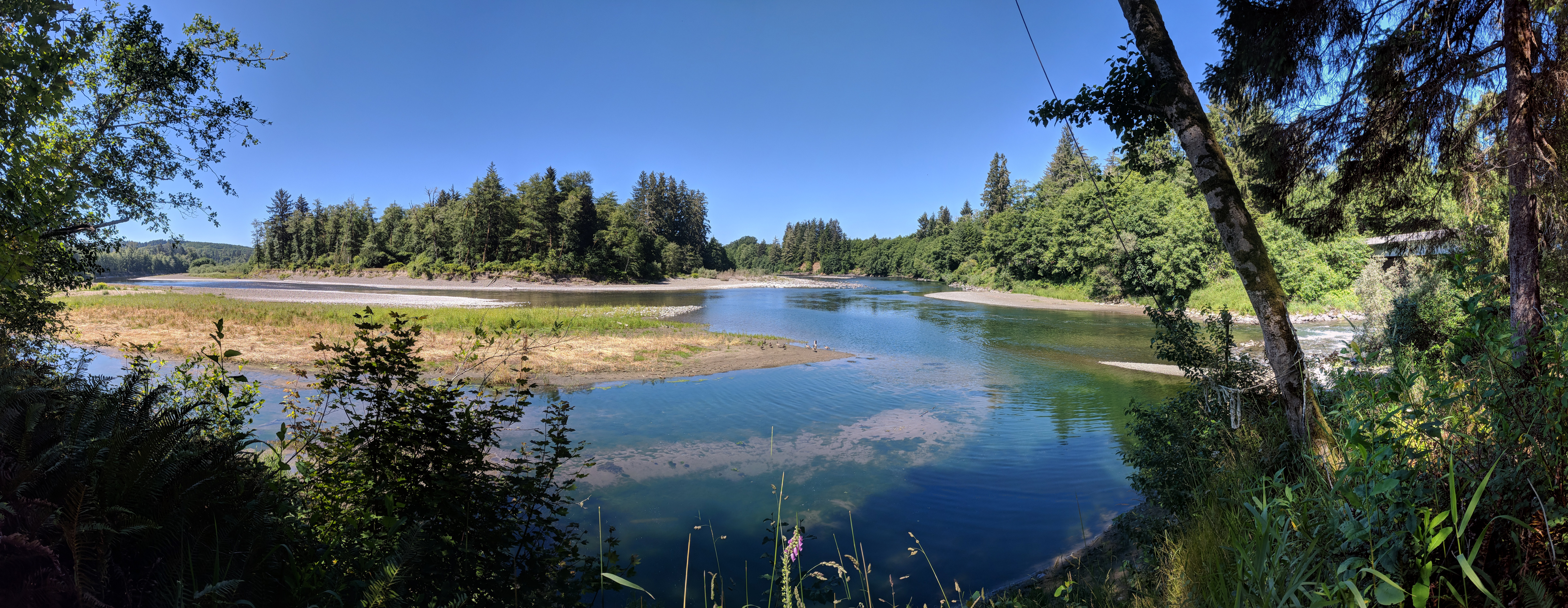
Panoramic view, from Leyendecker Park, of the confluence of the Bogachiel River (left and center) and the Sol Duc River (right) to form the Quillayute

== See also ==
- List of Washington rivers
- Quillayute Canyon
