= Maxfield Creek =

Stream in Washington, U.S.

Coordinates: 47°54′12″N 124°30′56″W

Maxfield Creek is a stream in the U.S. state of Washington.

A variant name was Mayfield Creek.

The stream was named after Jesse Maxfield, an early settler.

== See also ==
- List of rivers of Washington (state)
