= Lake Pleasant (Washington) =

Freshwater lake in the United States

- Location within Washington (state) Location within the United States
- Location: Clallam County, Washington, US
- Coordinates: 48°03′54″N 124°19′38″W
- Primary outflows: Lake Creek
- Basin countries: United States
- Surface elevation: 397 ft (121 m)

Lake Pleasant is a lake on the Olympic Peninsula, located in western Clallam County, Washington, United States. It has an area of 492.6 acres (2km^{2}), and the unincorporated community of Beaver is situated on its western shore.

== Ecology ==
According to the Washington Department of Fish and Wildlife, the lake is home to multiple species of fish, namely the brown bullhead, coastal cutthroat trout, kokanee salmon, and rainbow trout.
