= Dickey River =

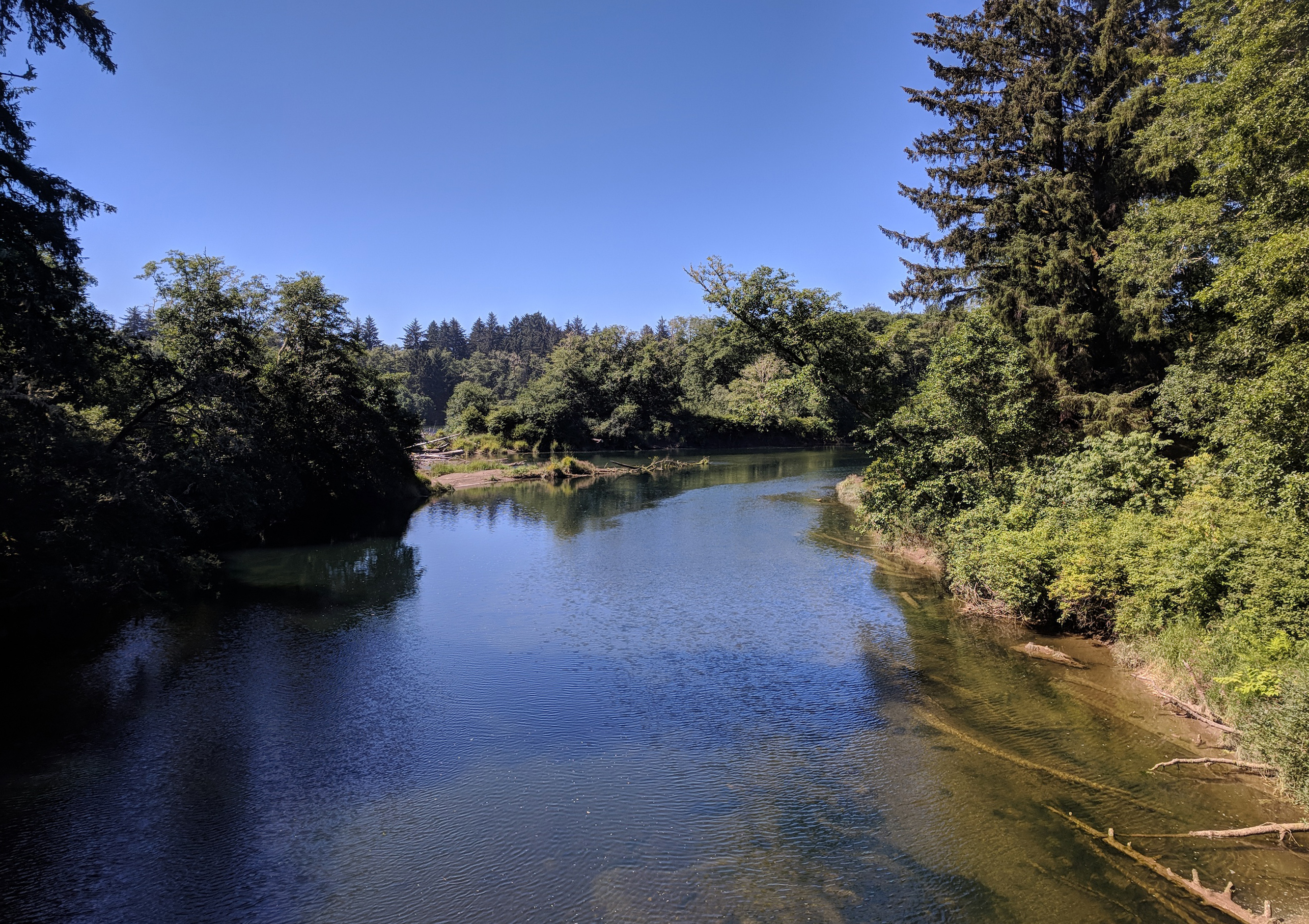
- Confluence of the Dickey with the Quillayute River, from the bridge at Mora Road near Rialto Beach

- Location of the mouth of the Dickey River in Washington

Location
- Country: United States
- State: Washington
- County: Clallam

Physical characteristics
- Source: Confluence of West and East Forks
  - location: Olympic Mountains
  - coordinates: 47°59′6″N 124°32′59″W
- Mouth: Quillayute River
  - coordinates: 47°55′16″N 124°37′24″W
  - elevation: 4 ft (1.2 m)

The Dickey River is a stream on the Olympic Peninsula in the U.S. state of Washington. It has three main forks, the East Fork, West Fork, and Middle Fork Dickey Rivers. The main stem is formed by the confluence of the East and West Forks. The river and its forks rise in the northwestern part of the Olympic Peninsula and flow generally south and west to join the Quillayute River near its mouth on the Pacific Ocean.

The river's name is a corruption of the Quileute term dichoh dock-teacer or de tho date t doh, pronounced "dā tȯ dȯtch't dōh". This term was applied to the river and a branch of the tribe living along the river. It meant "people who live on the first branch of the Quillayute River" or "people who live on the dark water".

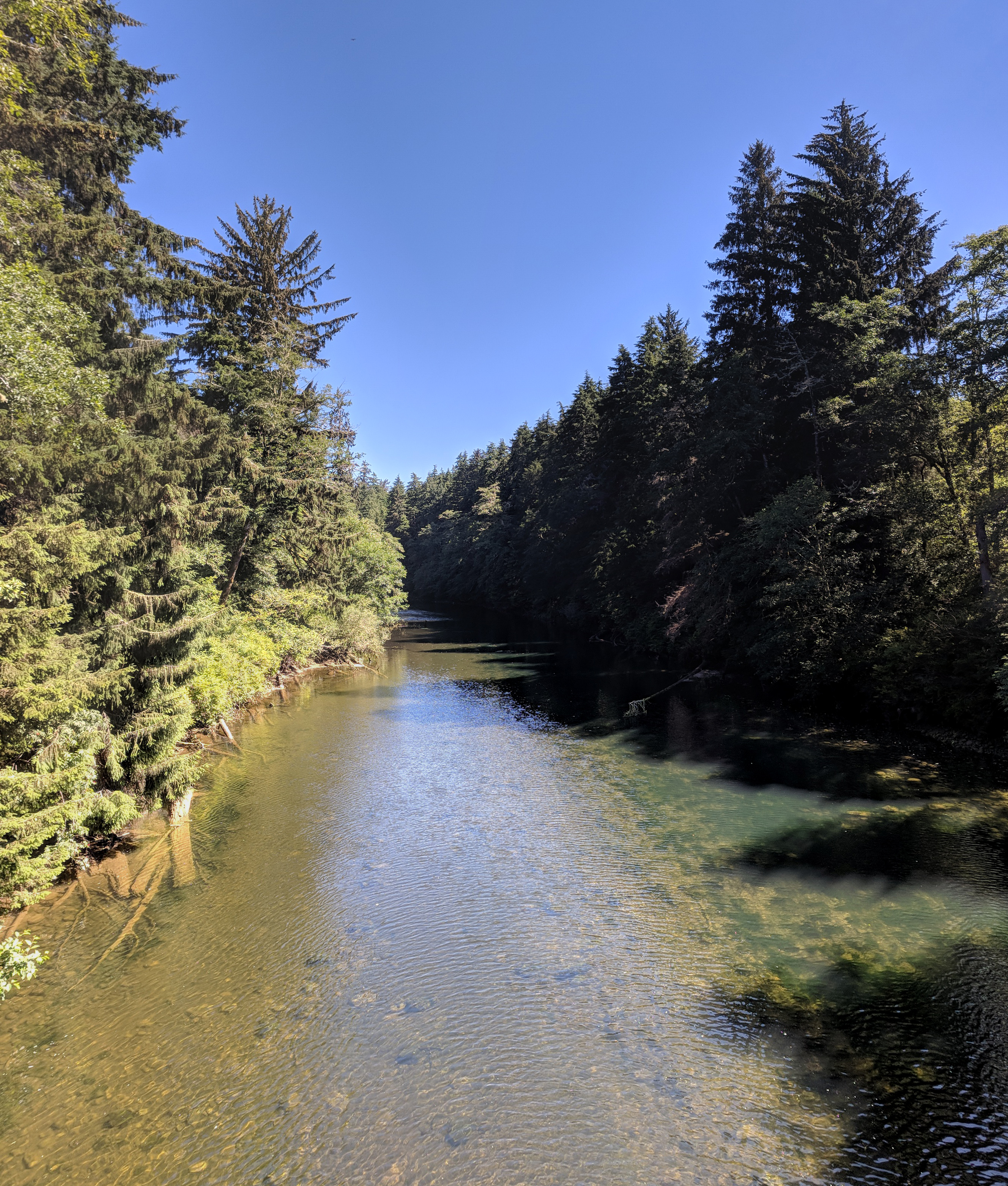
Looking upriver from the bridge at Mora Road

== East Fork ==
The East Fork Dickey River is approximately 16 miles (26 km) long and originates at 48°7′4″N 124°24′40″W, in the northwestern Olympic Peninsula. It flows generally south collecting tributaries such as Skunk Creek and Thunder Creek before joining the West Fork to form the main stem Dickey River.

== West Fork ==
The West Fork Dickey River is just over 20 miles (32 km) long and originates at 48°5′57″N 124°30′27″W, as the outflow of Dickey Lake. The lake is fed by a number of streams such as Stampedge Creek, Ponds Creek, and Sands Creek. The West Fork Dickey River exits the south end of Dickey Lake and soon collects the Middle Fork Dickey River. Shortly below the joining of the tributary include Squaw Creek the West Fork joins the East Fork to form the main stem Dickey River.

== Middle Fork ==
The Middle Fork Dickey River originates at 48°7′17″N 124°26′3″W, slightly east of Dickey Lake. It flows generally south to join the West Fork Dickey River.

== Main stem ==
The main stem Dickey River originates at the confluence of the East and West Forks and flows generally south for approximately 7 miles (11 km). Along the way it collects tributaries including Larger Creek, Cotby Creek, and Coat Creek. It flows by the Quillayute State Airport. The Dickey River empties into the Quillayute River about a mile north of La Push and the mouth of the Quillayute River. The confluence of the Dickey and Quillayute Rivers occurs within the narrow coastal strip of Olympic National Park.

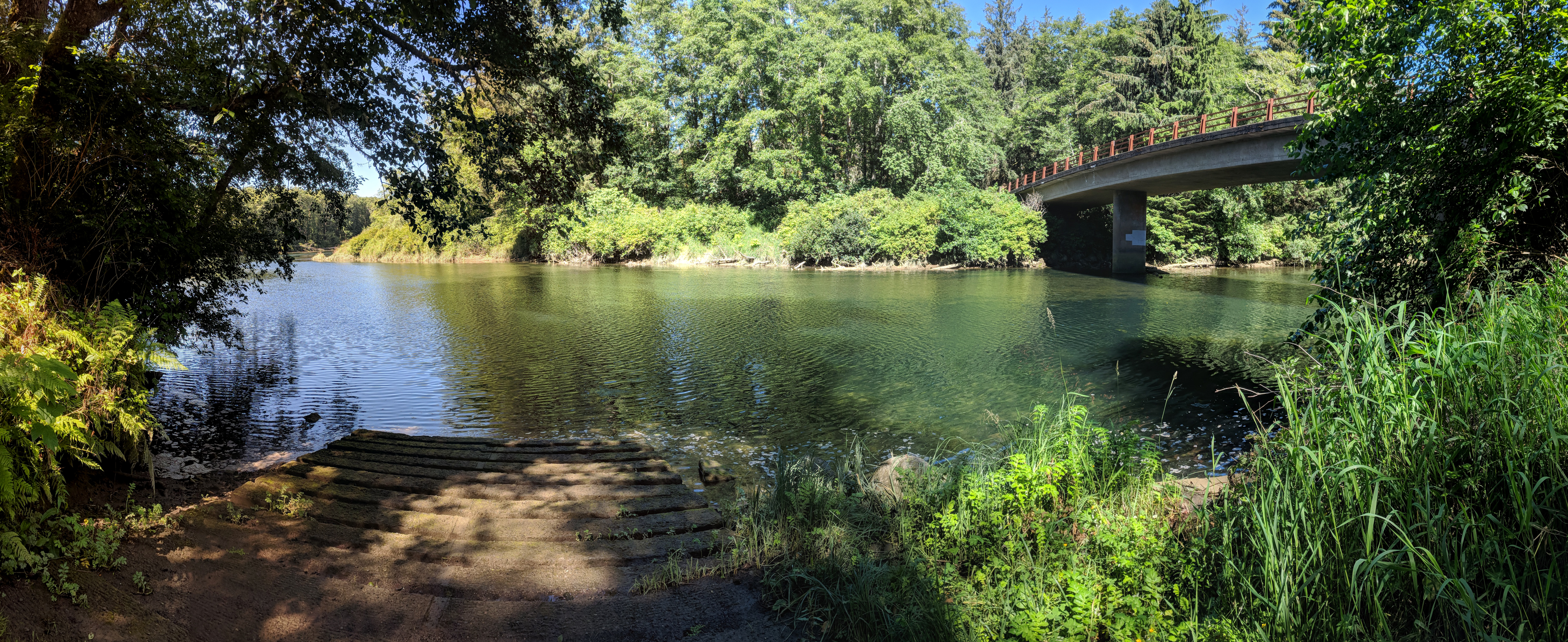
Panoramic view of the final stretch of the Dickey River, from the boat ramp between the Mora Road bridge and the confluence with the Quillayute

== See also ==
- List of rivers of Washington (state)
