= Calawah River =

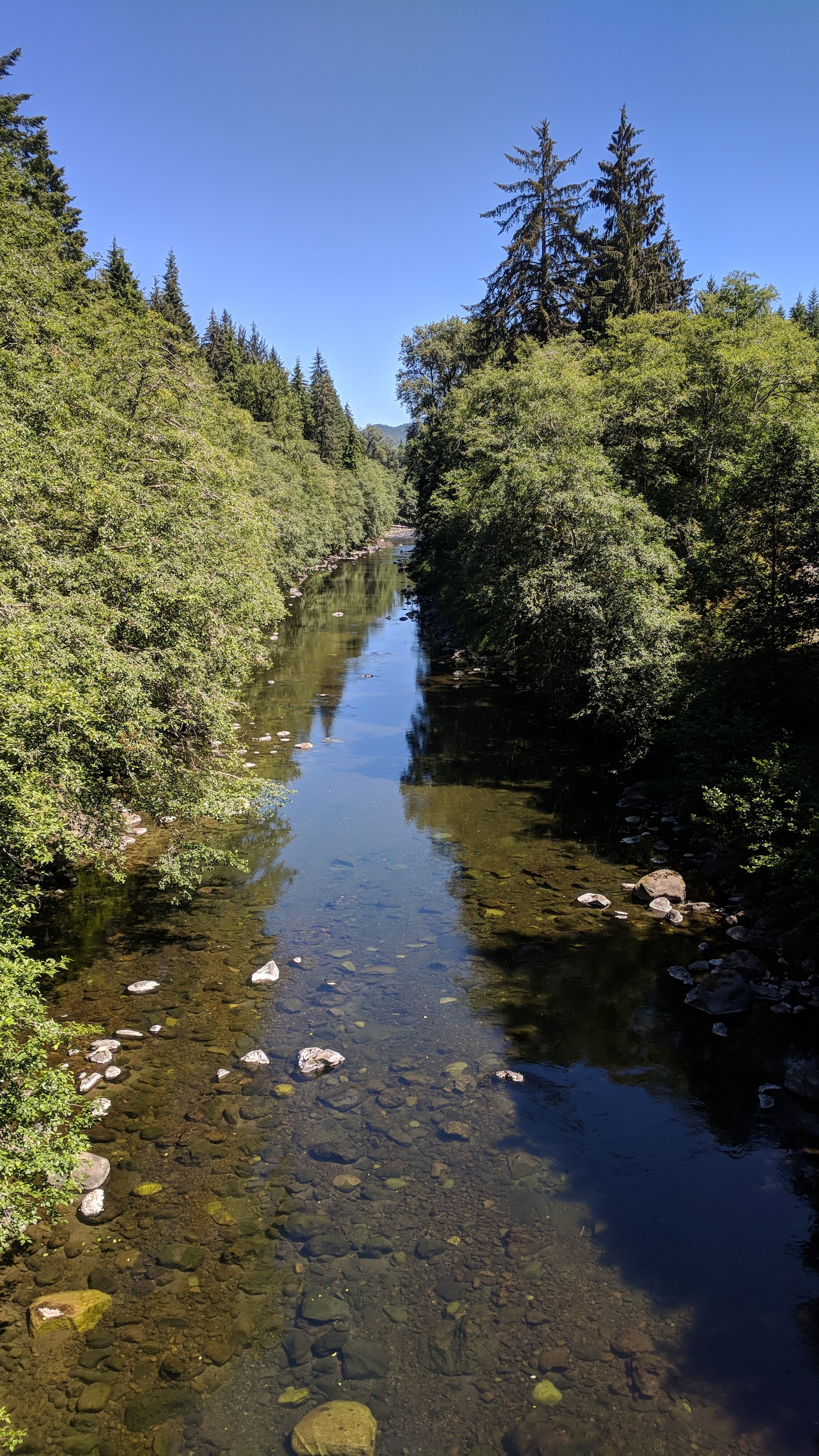
- Calawah River, looking upstream from the US Highway 101 bridge

Location
- Country: United States
- State: Washington
- Region: Clallam County, Washington

Physical characteristics
- Source: Olympic Mountains
  - location: Olympic Peninsula
  - coordinates: 47°58′14″N 124°20′03″W
- Mouth: Bogachiel River
  - coordinates: 47°55′58″N 124°26′51″W
  - elevation: 26 ft (7.9 m)
- Length: 31 mi (50 km)
- Basin size: 160 mi^{2} (410 km^{2})
- Discharge
  - location: USGS gage 12043000 at river mile 6.6, near Forks, WA
  - average: 1,048 cu ft/s (29.7 m^{3}/s)
  - minimum: 15 cu ft/s (0.42 m^{3}/s)
  - maximum: 38,100 cu ft/s (1,080 m^{3}/s)

Basin features
- Tributaries
  - left: South Fork Calawah River
  - right: North Fork Calawah River

The Calawah River is a 31 mi (50 km) tributary of the Bogachiel River in Clallam County in the U.S. state of Washington, on its Olympic Peninsula. Its two major tributaries are the South and North Forks Calawah River. The river drains an unpopulated portion of the low foothills of the Olympic Mountains; its entire watershed consists of virgin forest. The river drains 129 square miles (330 km^{2}) above U.S. Highway 101, which crosses the river about 6.6 miles (10.6 km) upstream of its mouth.

The river's name comes from the Quileute word qàló?wa:, meaning "in between", or "middle river".

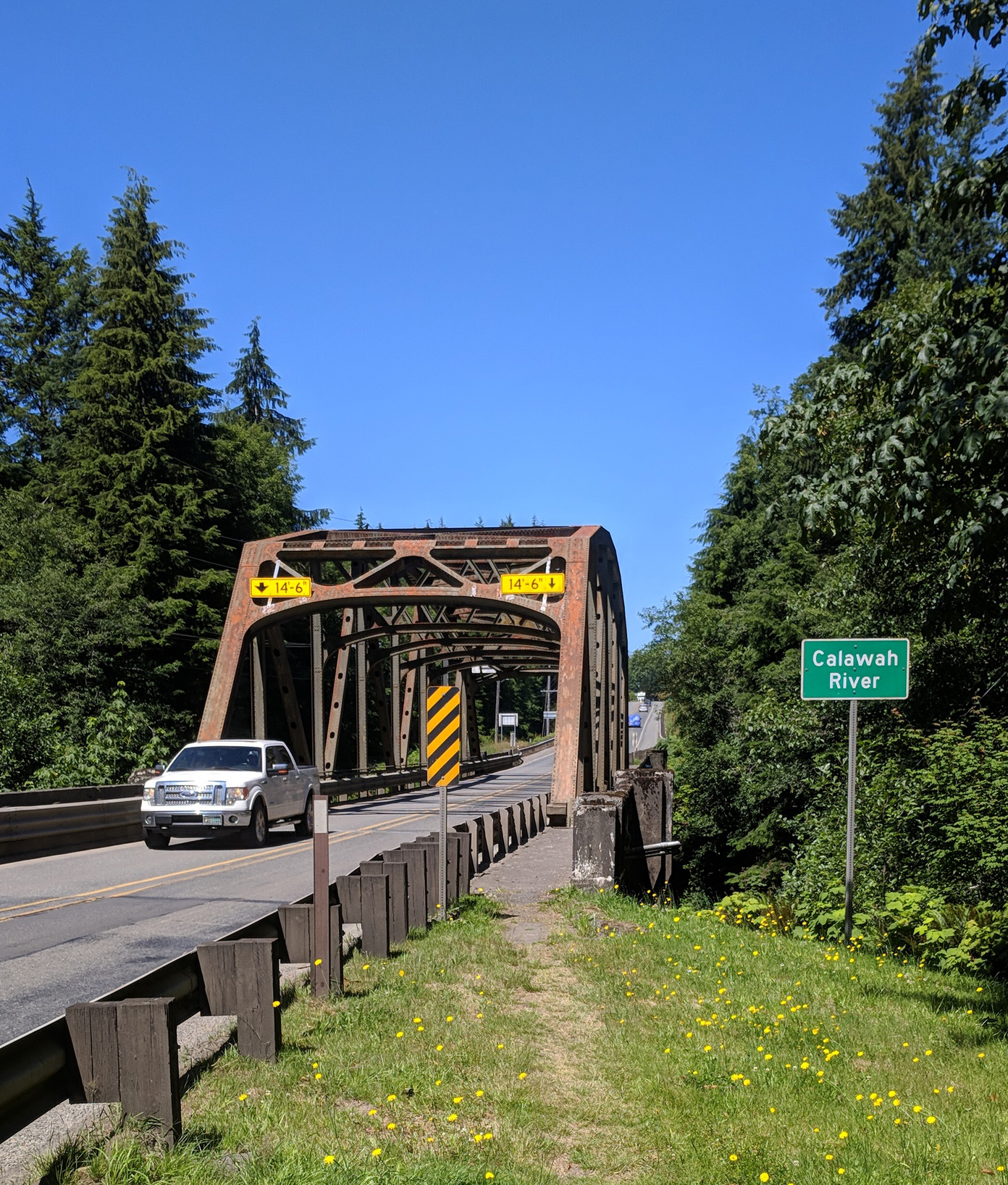
The highway 101 bridge over the Calawah River, near Forks, Washington

== See also ==
- List of rivers of Washington (state)
- Quillayute River
- Sol Duc River
