= Quillayute =

Quillayute may refer to:

- Quileute (tribe), or the Quillayute, a Native American people of western Washington state, United States
- Quillayute, also known as Quileute, a Chimakuan language of the Quileute and Makah people of western Washington state in the United States; see Quileute language
- Quillayute Airport, formerly known as Quillayute State Airport, a public airport in Clallam County, Washington, United States
- Quillehuyte County, Washington, a defunct county (alternate spelling of Quillayute)
- The Quillayute River, also called the Quileute River, a river on the Olympic Peninsula in western Washington state in the United States
- Forks, Washington, also previously known as the unincorporated town of Quillayute

See also

- Quileute (disambiguation)
