= James Island (Clallam County, Washington) =

Island in Clallam County, Washington, United States

Coordinates: 47°54′20.72″N 124°38′52.04″W

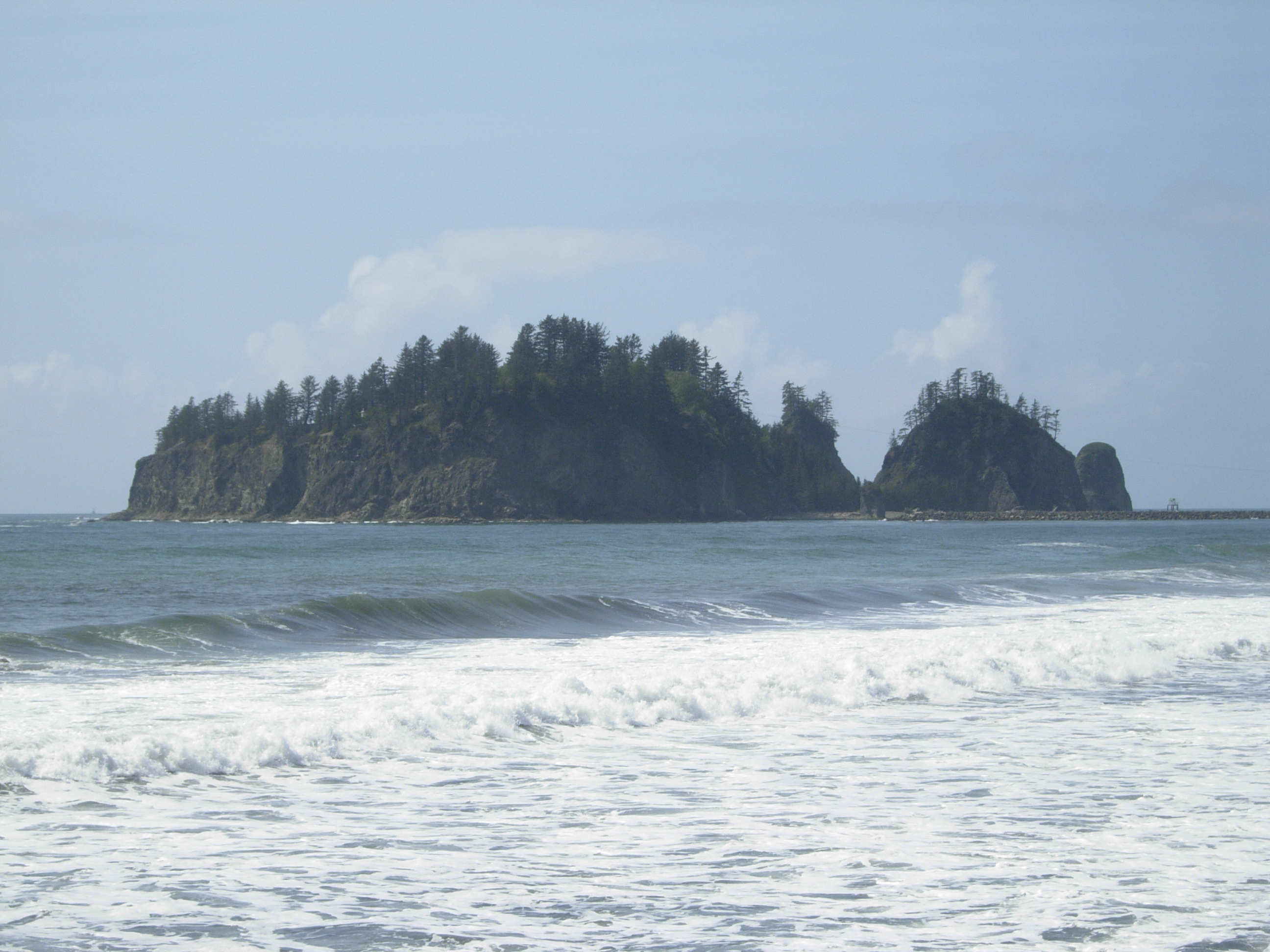
James Island as seen from First Beach at La Push

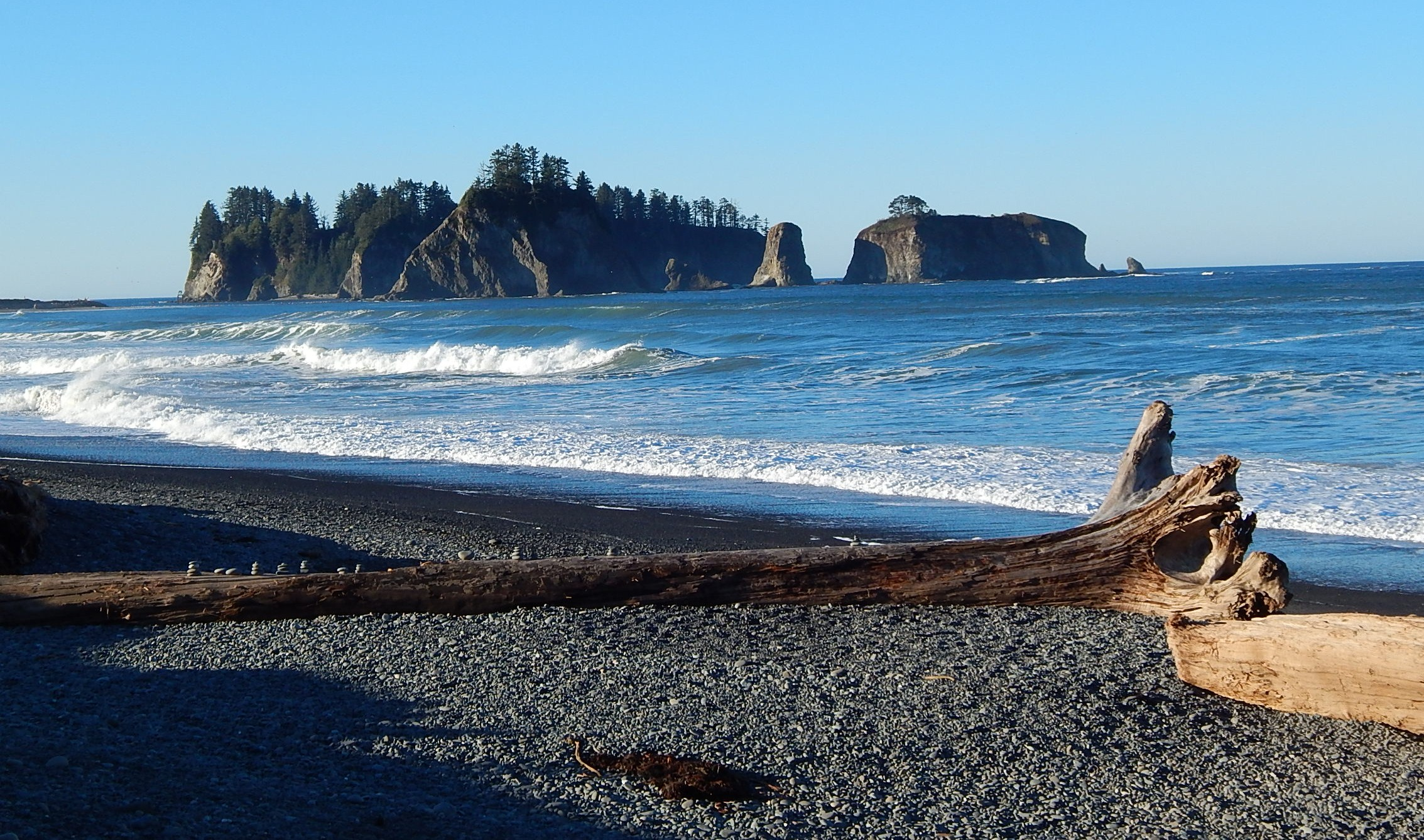
James Islands seen from Rialto Beach

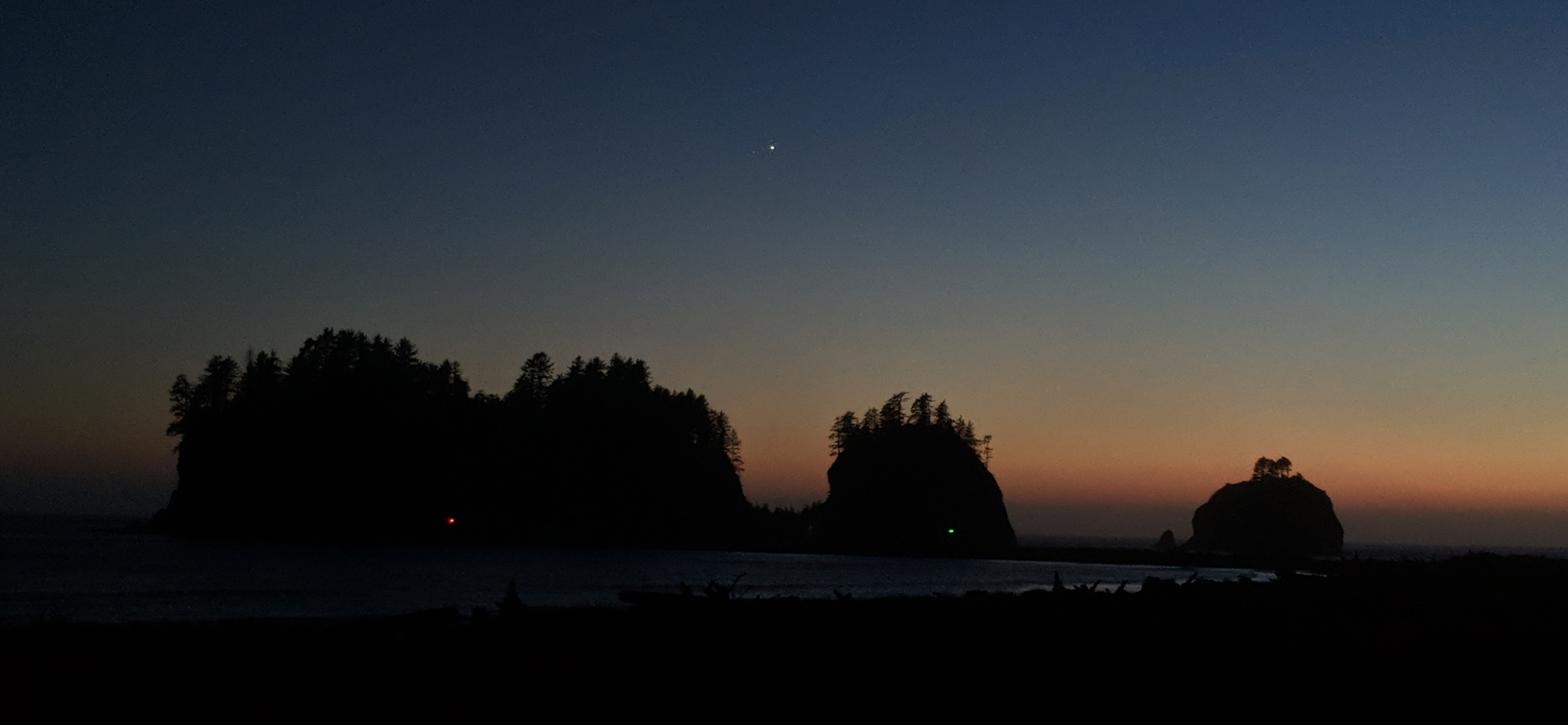
After sunset, with Venus visible in the sky, and red and green harbor channel markers visible at the entrance to the Quillayute River

James Island (Quileute: A-ka-lat - "Top of the Rock") is at the mouth of the Quillayute River near La Push, Washington. Local historians say it is named for Francis Wilcox James, a lighthouse keeper and friend of the Quileute Indians there, though the Origin of Washington Geographic Names attributes the name to Jimmie Howeshatta, a Quileute chief.

A fortified village was on the island until the second half of the 19th century. After this it was farmed by mainland residents and tribal chiefs were buried there. At 160 feet (49 m) in height, the island has also been a lookout to spot whales. The island was once a sea stack, connected to the mainland. The US Army Corps of Engineers separated it by rerouting the Quillayute River. Today, the US Coast Guard operates an automated lighthouse and foghorn for boats using the harbor.

In 1966, James Island was removed from the Quillayute Needles National Wildlife Refuge by the U.S. Department of the Interior. The Interior Department returned the island to the Quileute people because it was in the historic Quileute Indian Reservation. No people outside of the Quileute tribe are allowed on the island.
