= Quileute (disambiguation) =

The Quileute are a Native American people of western Washington state. Quileute may also refer to:

- Quileute Canyon
- Quileute language, their language
- Quileute Tribal School, a Native American school in La Push, Washington
- Quillayute River, a river on the Olympic Peninsula in western Washington state
- USS Quileute (YTB-540), later YTM-540, a United States Navy tug placed in service in 1945 and sold in 1974
