= Quileute Tribal School =

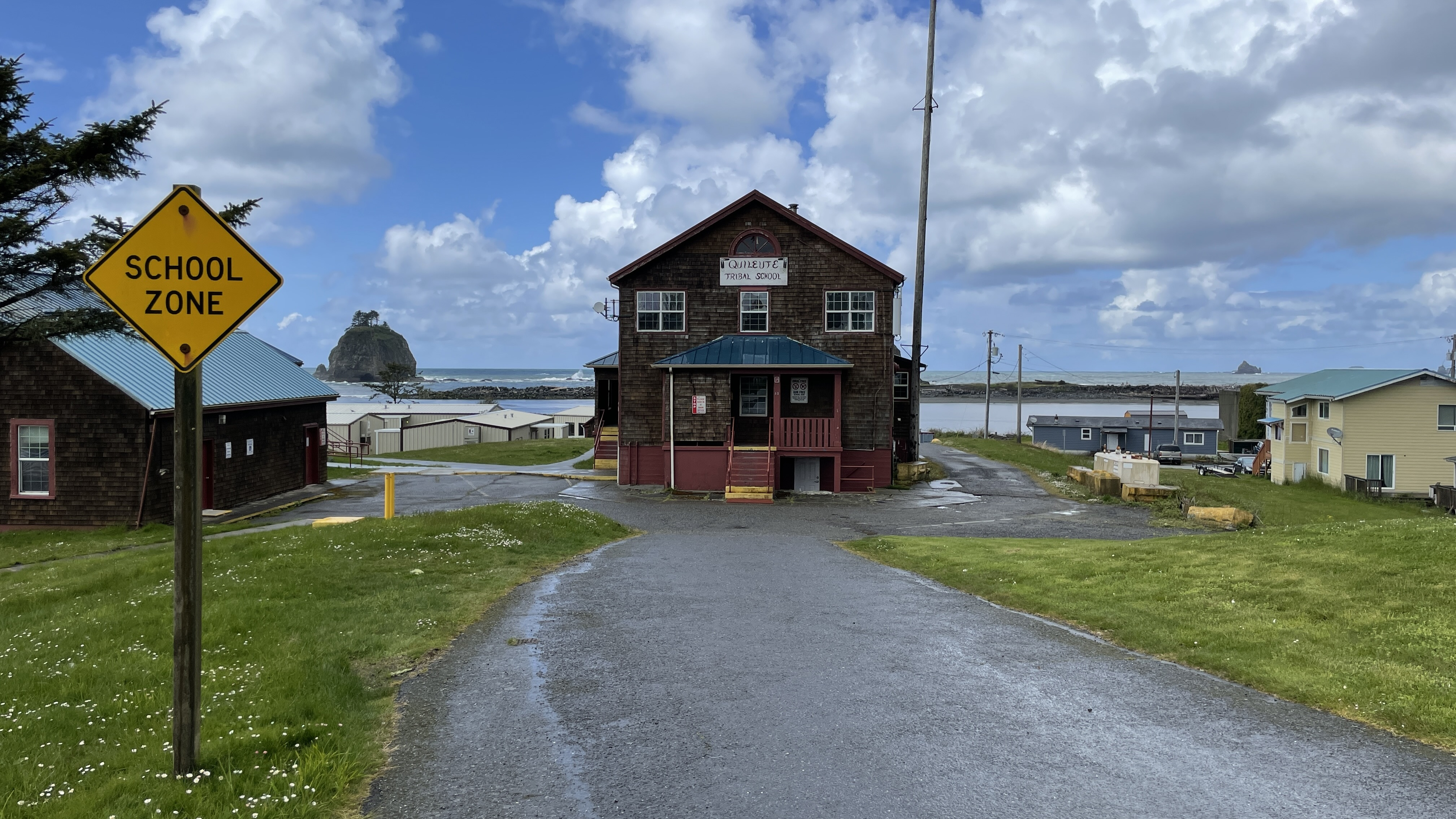
- Former building

Location
- La Push, Washington; 47°53′28″N 124°36′38″W

Information
- Type: K-12 school
- Established: 1979
- NCES School ID: 590012700127
- Gender: co-ed
- Age range: 5-18
- Mascot: Wolves

Quileute Tribal School (QTS) is a Quileute, Native American school located in La Push, Washington. It is a K-12 school, serving students in grades kindergarten – 12. QTS is affiliated with the Bureau of Indian Education (BIE). It has a compact with the state of Washington and receives a grant from the BIE.

The school is accredited by AdvancED.

The school was founded in 1979.

There were ten elderly speakers of the Quileute language in 1977, and "a few" in 1999. The Quileute Nation is attempting to prevent the loss of the Quileute language by teaching it to students in the Quileute Tribal School, using books written for the students by the tribal elders. The Quileute Tribal School is the most common way that Quileutes spread their language that (as of 1992) only 3 people, two in their 80s, speak fluently.

== History of Formal Education in La Push ==
The first school opened in 1883 by schoolmaster A.W. Smith. Classes were held in a building rented from Dan Pullen. Some families were apprehensive and moved upriver to protect their children. After the fire of 1889, Pullen was angry with Smith for not supporting his homestead application and refused to continue renting the building. By 1904, a new school was built. The school closed in the late 1930s. From the 1930s to the 1970s, children were bused to the Quillayute Prairie School. Preschool had been taught in the village since 1970.

Community concerns about racism lead to the tribe funding and establishing the Quileute Tribal School. Planning for a new school began in 1977, the first school board was elected in 1978, and classes began in 1979. Initially, classes were held in portable buildings, the shaker church, tribal offices, and other locations until the old Coast Guard building finished renovations later that year. A new elementary school building was constructed in 1994. As part of the village's move to higher ground, construction of another new school building outside of the tsunami zone was completed in 2022.

== Move to higher ground ==
The school building was constructed in 1992, on low ground, close to the Pacific Ocean. This proximity to the ocean made the school vulnerable to storm surges as well as tsunami events. In 2012, Barack Obama signed legislation that increased the size of the Quileute Indian Reservation by 785 acres (318 ha), including a tract on ground higher than the rest of the village. The Quileute Tribe decided to construct a new school on the higher ground. In 2016, the Bureau of Indian Affairs selected the school for replacement through the No Child Left Behind Act. The tribe received a $44.1 million grant from the Bureau to relocate the school in 2018. Timber was harvested from the site and sold for some additional funding. Construction was estimated to cost around $500 per square foot for the new facilities. On July 2, 2020, ground was broken on construction of the new school. The new facilities are in a location deemed safe from tsunami risk, and were designed to accommodate 175 students. Construction was completed in 2022.

== See also ==
- Quillayute Valley School District - The area school district
