= Second Beach =

Second Beach is the name of several beaches:

In the United States

- Sachuest Beach, Rhode Island, often known as Second Beach
- Second Beach (Olympic National Park), La Push, Washington

Elsewhere

- Second Beach (Vancouver), in Vancouver, Canada
- Second Beach (New Zealand), in Dunedin, New Zealand
- Second Beach, in Port Saint Johns, South Africa
