= Hoh people =

Native American tribe of the Pacific Northwest

Coordinates: 47°44′31″N 124°25′17″W

Hoh Indian Tribe
Chalá·at
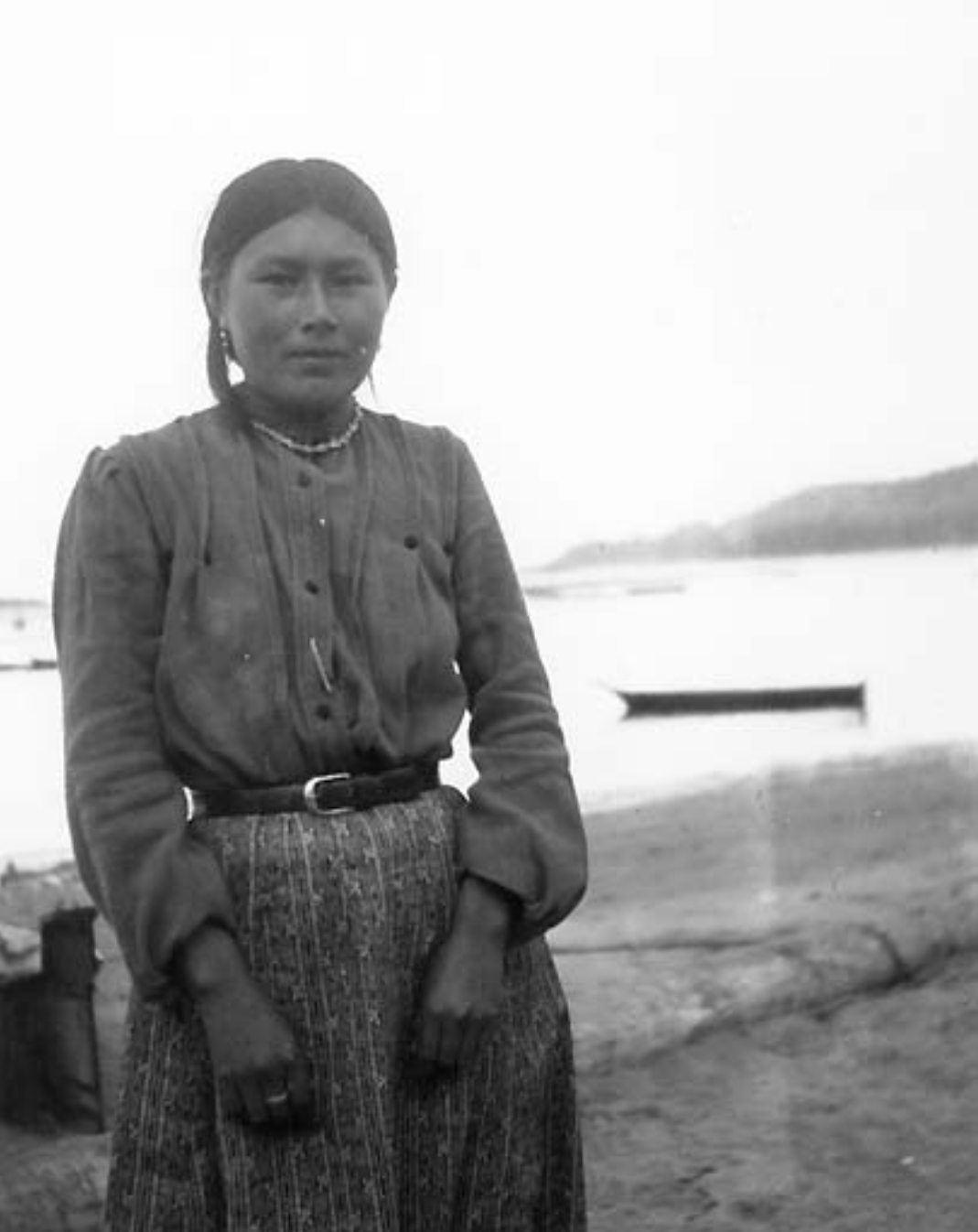
- A Hoh woman, photographed in 1905

Regions with significant populations
- United States (Washington)

Languages
- Quinault, Quileute, English

Location of the Hoh Indian Reservation

The Hoh or Chalá·at ("Those-Who-Live-on-the-Hoh River" or "People of the Hoh River") are a Native American tribe in western Washington state in the United States. The tribe lives near the Pacific Coast of Washington on the Olympic Peninsula. The Hoh moved onto the Hoh Indian Reservation at the mouth of the Hoh River, on the Pacific Coast of Jefferson County, after the signing of the Quinault Treaty on July 1, 1855. The reservation has a land area of 1.929 square kilometres (477 acres) and a 2000 census resident population of 102 persons, 81 of whom were Native Americans. It lies about halfway between its nearest outside communities of Forks, to its north, and Queets (on the Quinault Indian Reservation), to its south. The river is central to their culture. The main resources they used included cedar trees, salmon, and the nearby vegetation. They also traded and bartered with other tribes closer to Eastern Washington, near the Plateaus and Great Plains.

== Name ==
The name of the Hoh River, and the Hoh who were named after it, is derived from the Quinault language name for the river, húxʷ.

The Hoh call themselves Chalá·at or Chalat' (′People of the southern river, i.e. Hoh River′) after their name for the Hoh River Cha’lak’at’sit or Chalak'ac'it, which means the "southern river".

== History ==
During the times when the Hoh people populated the Hoh watershed, seven permanent settlements were situated along the banks of the Hoh, most with a fish trap. The river served as a riverine thoroughfare leading to their fishing sites and their hunting, trapping, and foraging grounds. It was also the nursery of the salmon and other fish which were harvested as part of their annual cycle. The watershed included the sites of the burials of their ancestors, the hidden locations of their guardian spirits, and the family campgrounds and upstream summer-homesites near resource gathering areas that were heritable family property. There were also named landmarks, sites associated with ritual and mythic occurrences, and riverside trails. The Hoh (Chalá·at) people refer to both their traditional lands and their reservation as ChalAt’i’lo t’sikAti, (′the land belonging to the people who live at the Hoh River′).

The lifestyle of the Hoh, like many Northwest Coast tribes, involved the fishing of salmon. They also hunted large marine mammals off the coast, including seals, sea lions, and whales, for food and other uses. The tribe's population declined significantly following contact with European American explorers in the 19th century, which brought a smallpox epidemic. A census conducted in 1901 counted 64 total members.

Though the Hoh (Chalá·at) are today considered to be a band of the Quileute tribe, the original Hoh language was actually the Quinault language and they were related to the Quinault. After intermarriage with the Quileute, the Hoh became a bilingual tribe, speaking both Quileute and Quinault, until the Quileute language was favored. Today, however, all three tribes have overwhelmingly adopted American English as their home language.

== Ethnobotany ==
The Hoh make use of Vaccinium myrtilloides. They eat the fruit raw, stew the berries and make them into a sauce, and can the berries to preserve them for consumption in the winter .

== Hoh Indian Reservation ==
The Hoh Indian Reservation was established on September 11, 1893, by an executive order signed by President Grover Cleveland. The Hoh had originally been assigned to the Quinault Indian Reservation per the terms of the 1855 Quinault Treaty, which was not signed with their knowledge. The 837-acre (339 ha) reservation lies on the Lower Hoh River and includes a co-managed fishery for salmon.

== See also ==
- Hoh Rainforest
- Hoh River
- Makah
