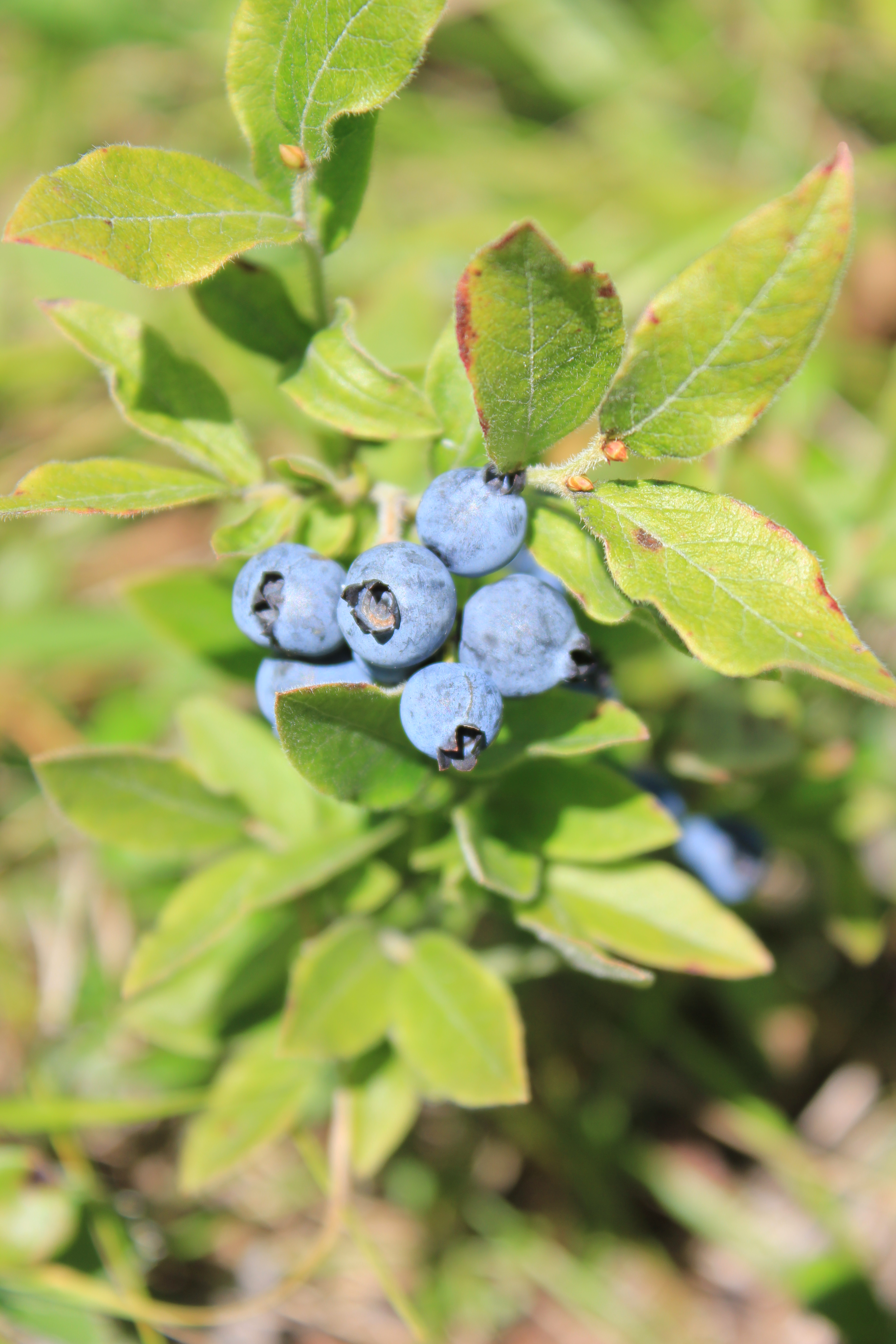

Conservation status
- Secure (NatureServe)

Scientific classification
- Kingdom: Plantae
- Clade: Embryophytes
- Clade: Tracheophytes
- Clade: Spermatophytes
- Clade: Angiosperms
- Clade: Eudicots
- Clade: Asterids
- Order: Ericales
- Family: Ericaceae
- Genus: Vaccinium
- Section: Vaccinium sect. Cyanococcus
- Species: V. myrtilloides

Binomial name
- Vaccinium myrtilloides Michx. 1803

Synonyms
- Vaccinium angustifolium var. myrtilloides (Michx.) House

= Vaccinium myrtilloides =

Berry and plant

Vaccinium myrtilloides is a North American species of blueberry with common names including common blueberry, velvetleaf huckleberry, velvetleaf blueberry, Canadian blueberry, and sourtop blueberry.

== Description ==
Vaccinium myrtilloides is a low spreading deciduous shrub growing up to 50 centimetres (20 in) tall, often spreading to form small thickets. Young stems have stiff dense bristly hairs. The leaves are 1.5–6.5 cm (1/2–2 1/2 in) long, green, paler underneath with velvety hairs.

The flowers are white, bell-shaped, 5 millimetres (1/4 in) long. The fruit is a small sweet bright blue to dark blue berry.

It is diploid, with 24 total chromosomes.

== Distribution and habitat ==
It is common in much of North America, reported from all 10 Canadian provinces plus Nunavut and Northwest Territories, as well as from the northeastern and Great Lakes states in the United States. It is also known to occur in Montana and Washington.

== Ecology ==
Vaccinium myrtilloides grows best in open coniferous woods with dry loose acidic soils; it is also found in forested bogs and rocky areas. It is fire-tolerant and is often abundant following forest fires or clear-cut logging. Vaccinium myrtilloides hybridizes in the wild with V. angustifolium (lowbush blueberry).

It is an important food source for black bears, deer, small mammals, and birds.

== Conservation ==
This species is listed as endangered in Indiana and Connecticut, as threatened in Iowa and Ohio, and as sensitive in Washington.

== Cultivation ==
Vaccinium myrtilloides is cultivated and grown commercially in Canada and Maine, primarily harvested from managed wild patches. The edible fruit is one of the sweetest blueberries known.

== Native American ethnobotany ==
=== As cuisine ===
The Abenaki consume the fruit as part of their traditional diet. The Nihithawak Cree eat the berries raw, make them into jam and eat it with fish and bannock, and boil or pound the sun-dried berries into pemmican. The Hesquiaht First Nation make pies and preserves from the berries. The Hoh and Quileute consume the fruit raw, stew the berries and make them into a sauce, and can the berries and use them as a winter food. The Ojibwa make use of the berries, gathering and selling them, eating them fresh, sun drying and canning them for future use. The Nlaka'pamux make the berries into pies. The Algonquin people gather the fruit to eat and sell. The berries are part of Potawatomi traditional cuisine, and are eaten fresh, dried, and canned.

=== As medicine ===
The Nihithawak Cree use a decoction of leafy stems used to bring menstruation and prevent pregnancy, to make a person sweat, to slow excessive menstrual bleeding, to bring blood after childbirth, and to prevent miscarriage. The Potawatomi also use the root bark of the plant for an unspecified ailment.

=== Other uses ===
The Nihithawak Cree use the berries to dye porcupine quills.

== See also ==
- Huckleberry
