= Quinault Indian Nation =

Native American tribe in Washington state, U.S.

Coordinates: 47°25′05″N 124°08′19″W

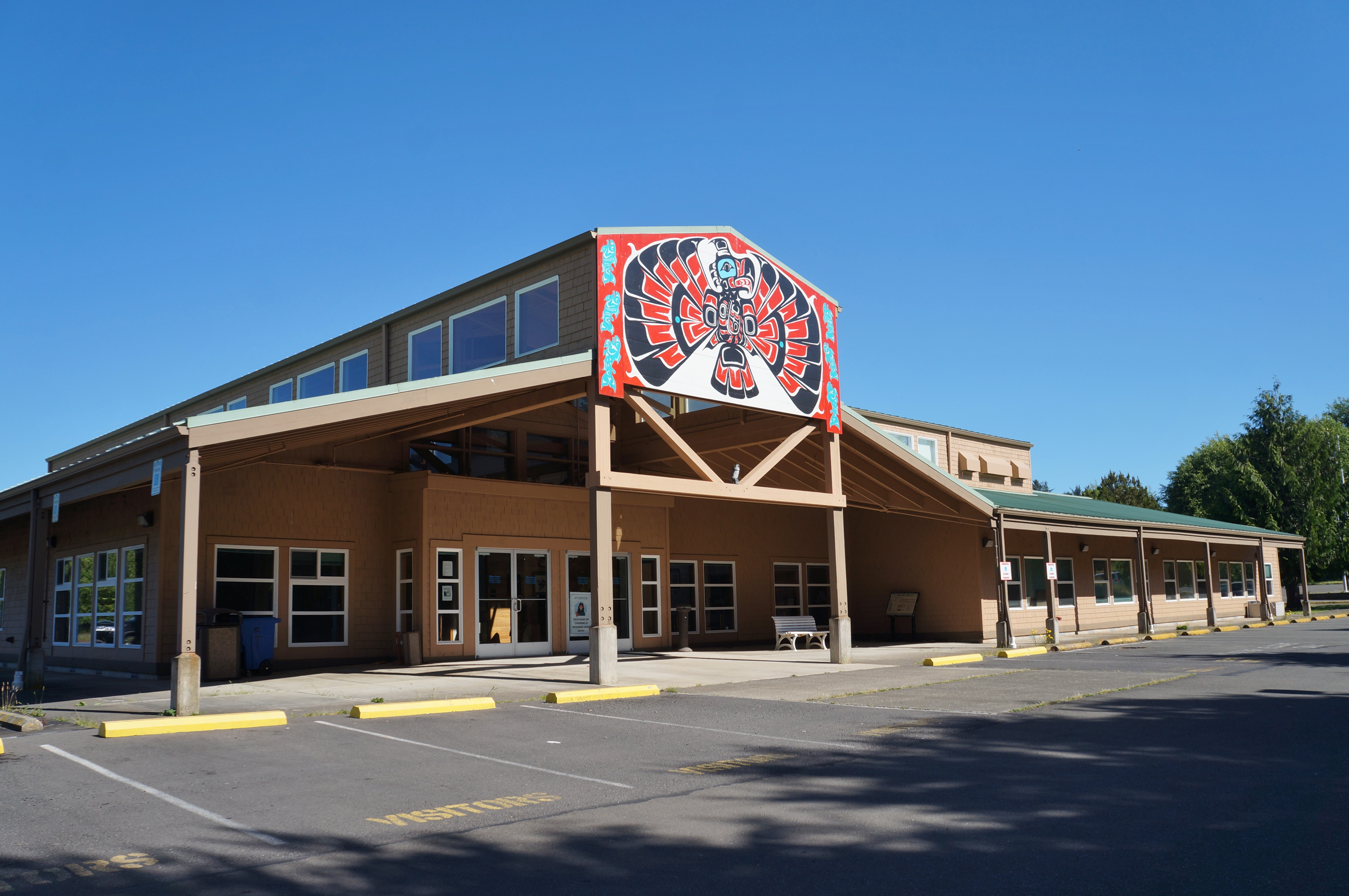
- The Quinault Indian Nation administration building in Taholah, WA

Total population
- 2,535 enrolled members (1999)

Regions with significant populations
- United States (Washington)

Languages
- English, formerly Quinault, Quileute, Cowlitz, Chinook

Religion
- traditional tribal religion

Related ethnic groups
- other Quinault, Queets, Quileute, Hoh, Chehalis, Cowlitz, and Chinook peoples

The Quinault Indian Nation (/kwɪˈnɒlt/ or /kwɪˈnɔːlt/; QIN), formerly known as the Quinault Tribe of the Quinault Reservation, is a federally recognized tribe of Quinault, Queets, Quileute, Hoh, Chehalis, Chinook, and Cowlitz peoples. They are a Southwestern Coast Salish people of Indigenous peoples of the Pacific Northwest Coast. Their tribe is located in Washington state on the Pacific coast of the Olympic Peninsula. These peoples are also represented in other tribes in Washington and Oregon.

In July 2016, about 2,500 landowners with interests in the Quinault Reservation were offered about $59 million by the U.S. Department of Interior as part of its Native Lands Buy-Back Program as part of the settlement of the Cobell v. Salazar class-action suit. The land purchased will be put into trust for the tribe at this reservation. Among other tribes, a range of 41 to 45% of people have accepted such offers. The agency has restored about 1.5 million acres (610,000 ha) to tribes under this program.

== Reservation ==
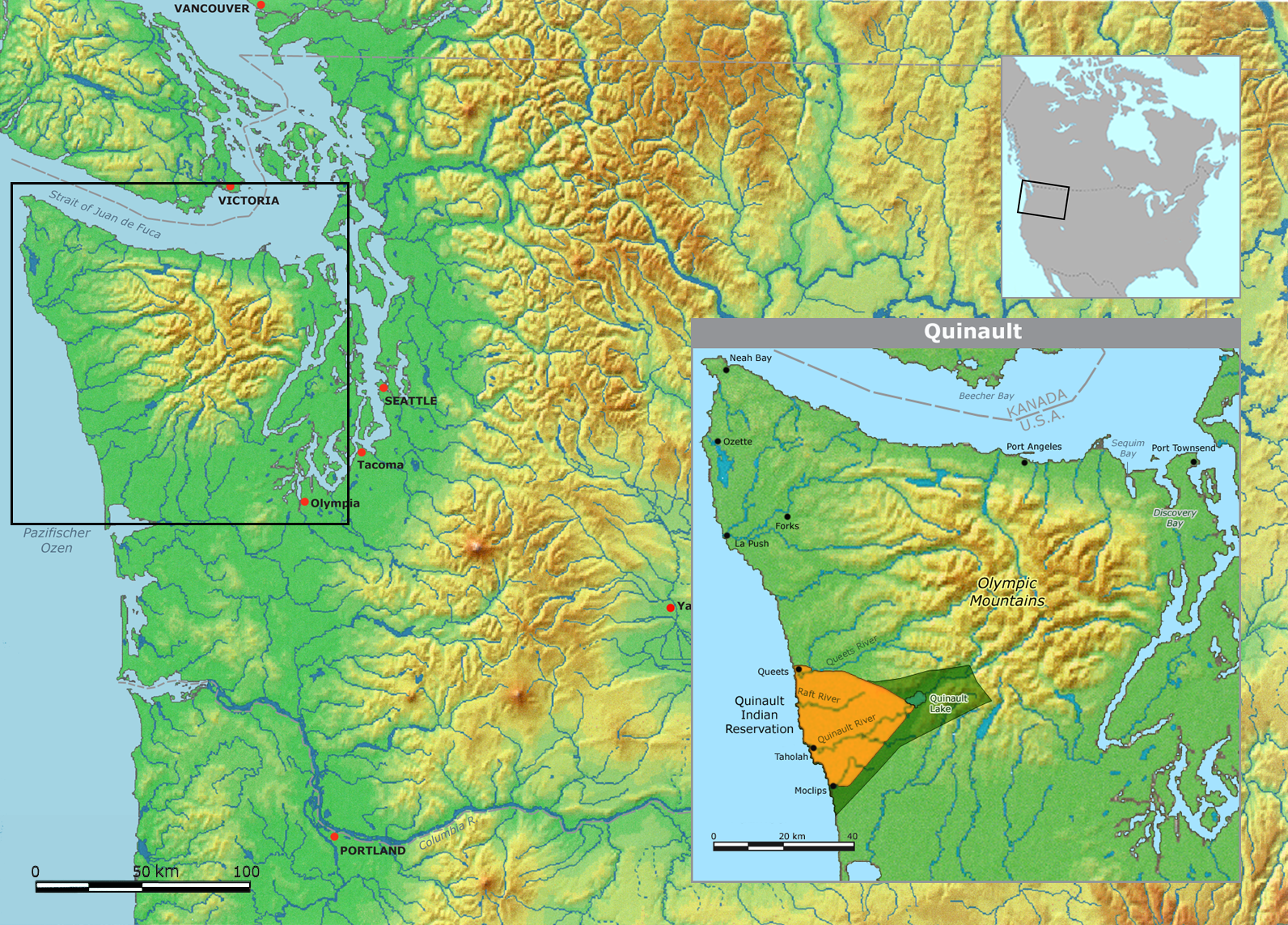
Map of Quinault traditional tribal territory and reservation

The Quinault Reservation was founded in 1855 with the signing of the Treaty of Olympia (also known as the Quinault River Treaty) with the United States. The reservation covers 208,150 acres (84,240 ha) and includes 23 miles (37 km) of Pacific coastline, located on the southwestern corner of the Olympic Peninsula. It is bordered by the Olympic National Park to the northwest, which was established in 1909 as a National Monument by President Teddy Roosevelt.

The reservation is in Grays Harbor and Jefferson counties, 45 miles (72 km) north of Hoquiam, Washington (x̣oʔkyɑməc). The three largest rivers on the reservation are the Quinault, the Queets, and the Raft. The Quinault Indian Nation owns Lake Quinault. Point Haynisisoos, officially Point Grenville, is a major promontory on the coast. It is significant to the tribe, and was the site of the 2013 Paddle to Quinault event. Haynisisoos Park on the top of the point, which features a totem pole honoring a Tribal Elder, was established during the event.

=== Taholah ===
Taholah (Quinault: tɑholɑ) is the largest settlement in the Quinault Reservation and is home to the tribal government's main facilities. In 2015, the tribal government proposed a $60 million plan to relocate the village to an uphill area southeast of the existing village, away from potential tsunami and flooding hazard zones. Construction on the relocated village began in 2019. The first part of the relocated village, a senior and children center named the Generations Building (WenɑsɡwəllɑʔɑW), opened in May 2021.

== Government ==
The Quinault Indian Nation is headquartered in Taholah, Washington. They ratified their bylaws on August 24, 1922, and their constitution in 1975.

The tribe is governed by an eleven-member Tribal Council, or "Business Committee", which is democratically elected by the adult tribal membership (the General Council) at regular annual meetings. As of 2024, tribal administration is as follows:

- President: Guy Capoeman
- Vice President: Noreen Underwood
- Treasurer: Hannah Curley
- Secretary: Mandy Hudson-Howard
- 1st Councilwoman: Gina James
- 2nd Councilmen: Jim Sellers
- 3rd Councilmen: John Bryson Jr.
- 4th Councilmen: Tyson Johnston
- 5th Councilwoman: Brittany Bryson
- 6th Councilmen: Kaylah Mail
- 7th Councilwomen: Kristeen Mowitch.

Enrollment to the Quinault Indian Tribe requires that an individual be descended from at least one of the Nation's seven tribes (Quinault, Queets, Quileute, Hoh, Chehalis, Cowlitz, and Chinook) and meet all other constitutional eligibility criteria for Quinault Nation membership. Persons who are direct descendants of members but have less than one-fourth blood quantum can apply to be formally adopted into the tribe.

== Language ==
English is commonly spoken by the tribe. Formerly tribal members spoke Quinault, Quileute, Cowlitz, and Chinook languages.

== Economic development ==
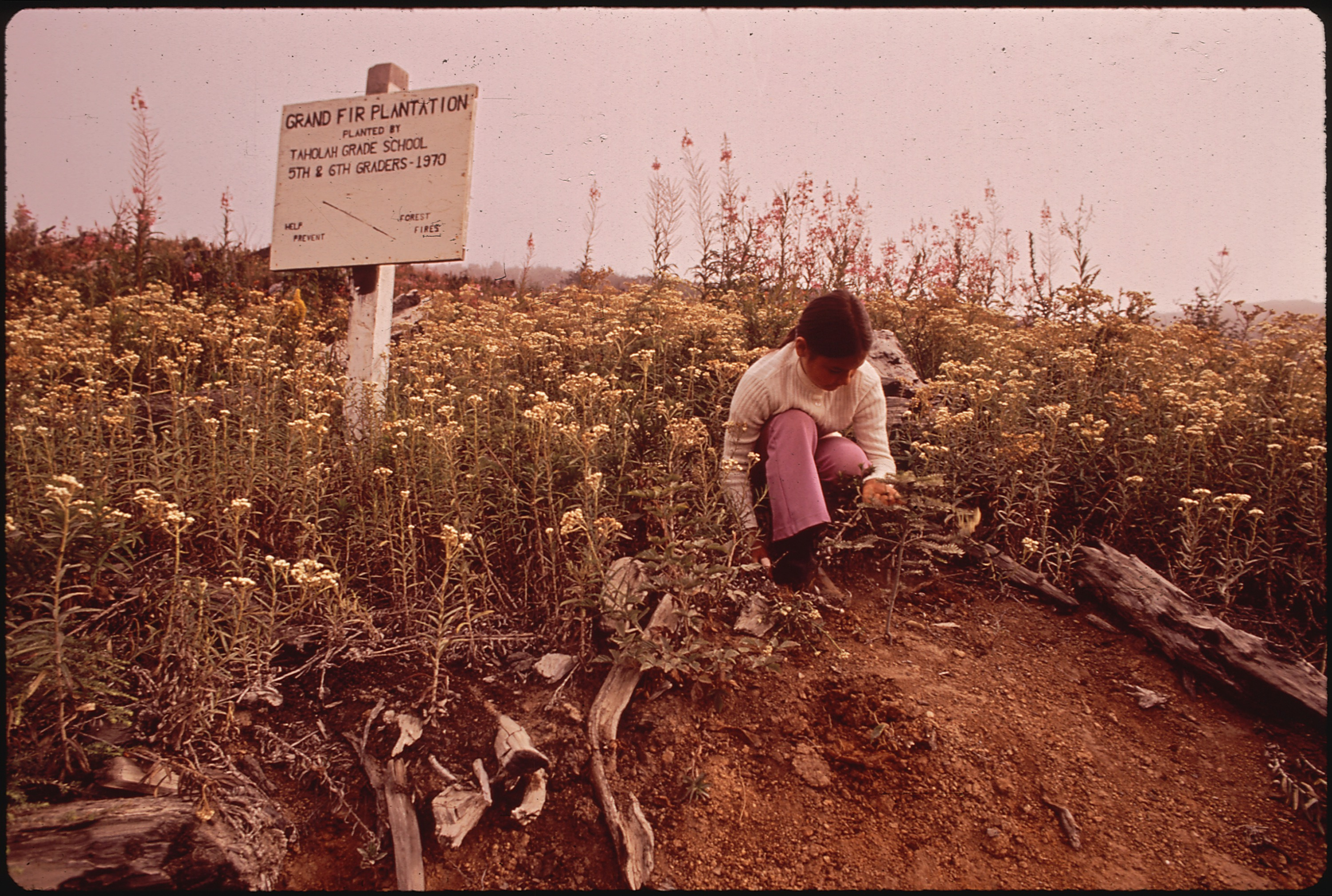
In 1970, Quinault children planted 10,000 fir trees.

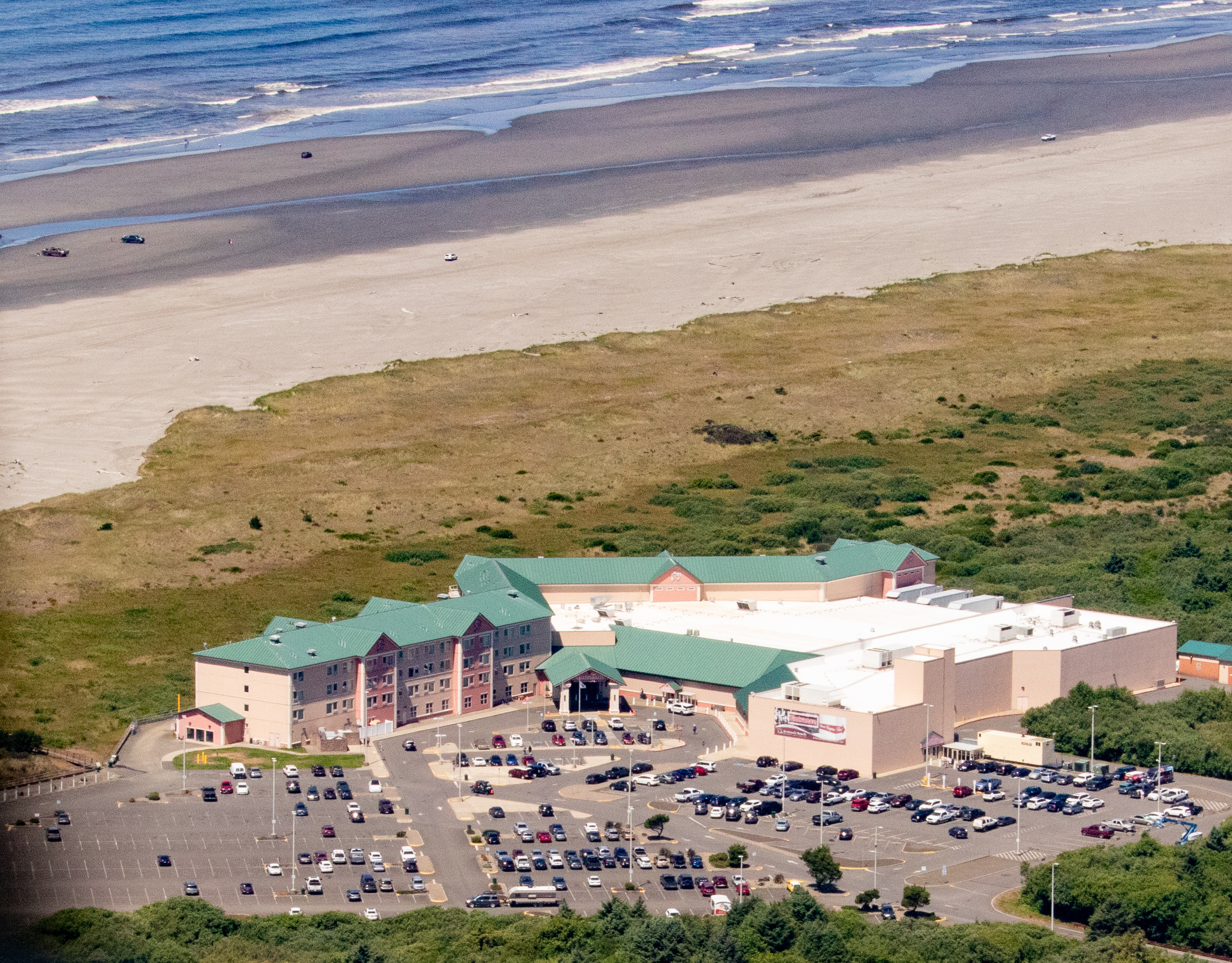
Quinault Beach Resort and Casino in 2023

The Quinault Indian Nation owns Quinault Pride Seafood, Land, and Timber Enterprises, and the Mercantile in Taholah, Washington. They run their own internal facilities and in the 21st century are the largest employer in Grays Harbor County.

They also own and operate the Quinault Beach Resort and Casino, a new enterprise started in the late 20th century; Emily's Ocean Front Restaurant, Sidewalk Bistro and Deli, coffee bar, and Fireplace Nook; and Qmart 1 in Oyehut, near Ocean Shores, Washington. They also own Qmart 2 in Aberdeen (Wɪškɑl).

Since 2009, the casino has been the site of the annual Hog Wild Rally, one of the largest motorcycle rallies in the Pacific Northwest.

In June 2018, $25 million in renovations and expansion to the Quinault Beach Resort and Casino were completed. This project included remodeling of 159 resort rooms, additional gaming area, a new feature bar, kitchen facilities and a tribal themed buffet restaurant.

== Notable people ==
- Fawn Sharp, Native American politician, attorney, and policy advocate
- Joe DeLaCruz, Native American politician, policy advocate
