= La Push Beach =

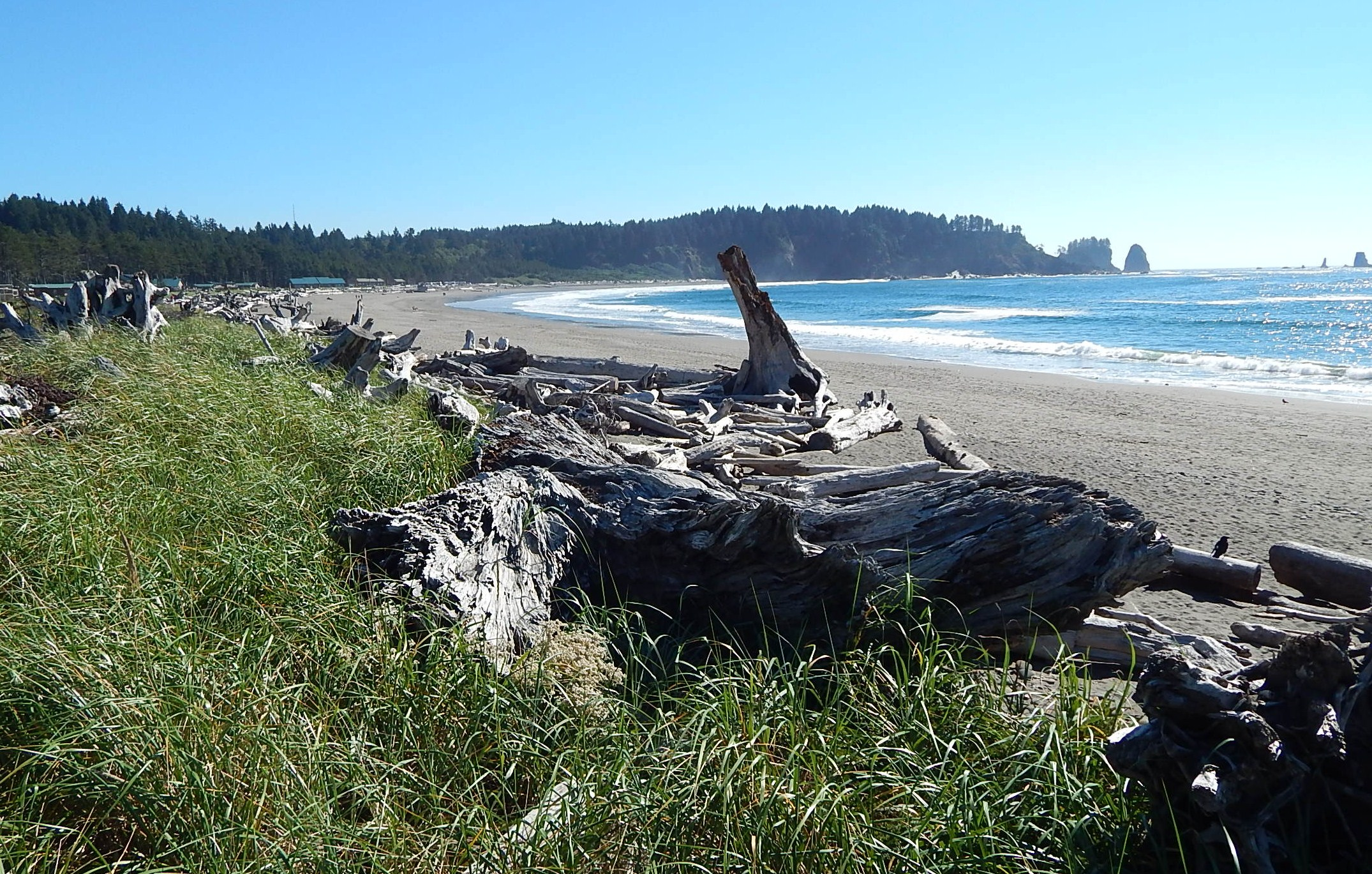
- First Beach, La Push, Washington coast, Olympic National Park
- Interactive map of La Push Beach
- Country: United States of America
- State: Washington

Population (2002)
  - Total: 11,285

La Push Beach is a series of three beaches near the community of La Push, Washington, on the Pacific coast of the United States. The beach's most prominent natural vegetation the Sitka, spruce, and evergreen trees that populate the shore.

== Beaches ==
=== First Beach ===
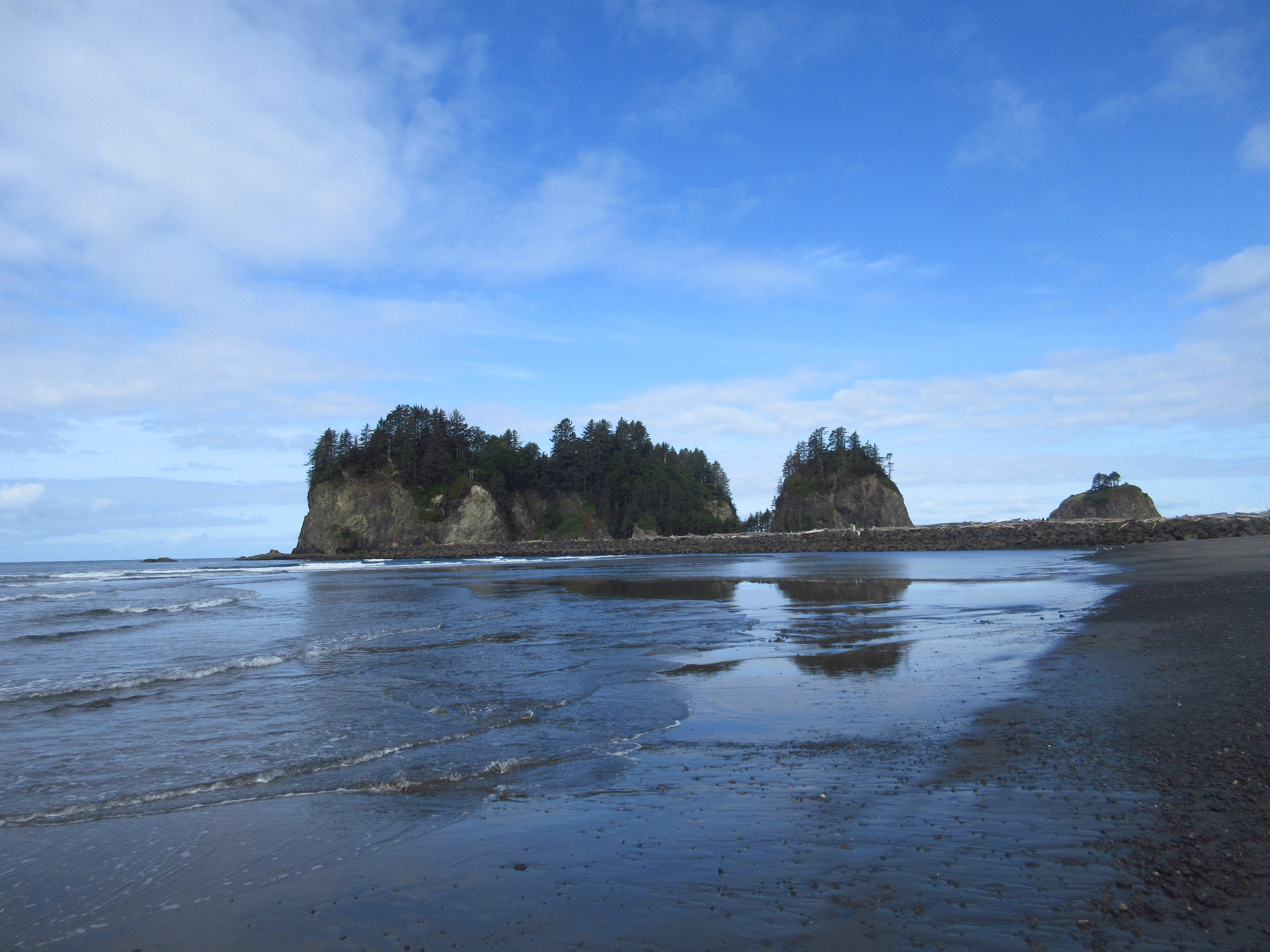
First Beach.

First Beach (47.9039614°N 124.6332702°W), the northernmost beach, is 14 miles (23 km) from the town of Forks, Washington. It is the only beach of La Push that can be accessed with a vehicle. The crescent shape beach brings in driftwood that slows down the waves and makes it dangerous to stand in the water. Within walking distance are a few homes of members of the Quileute Indian Tribe which is where the beach is located, the Quileute Indian Reservation.

The Oceanside Resort has a range of lodges for all budgets along First Beach. The tourist attractions most popular are surfing and fishing in the spring, hiking in the summer, and storm watching in the winter and fall.

=== Second Beach ===
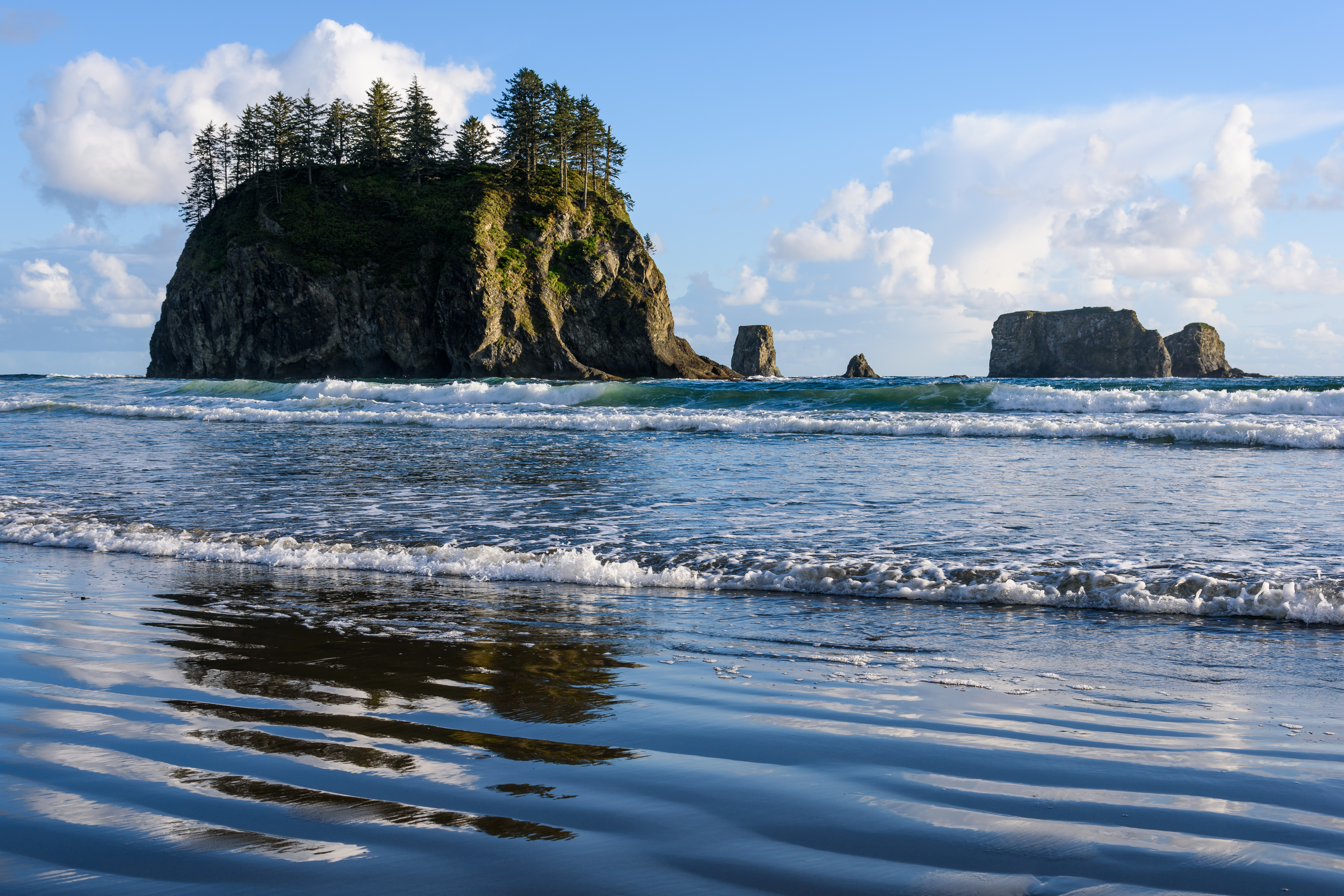
Second Beach

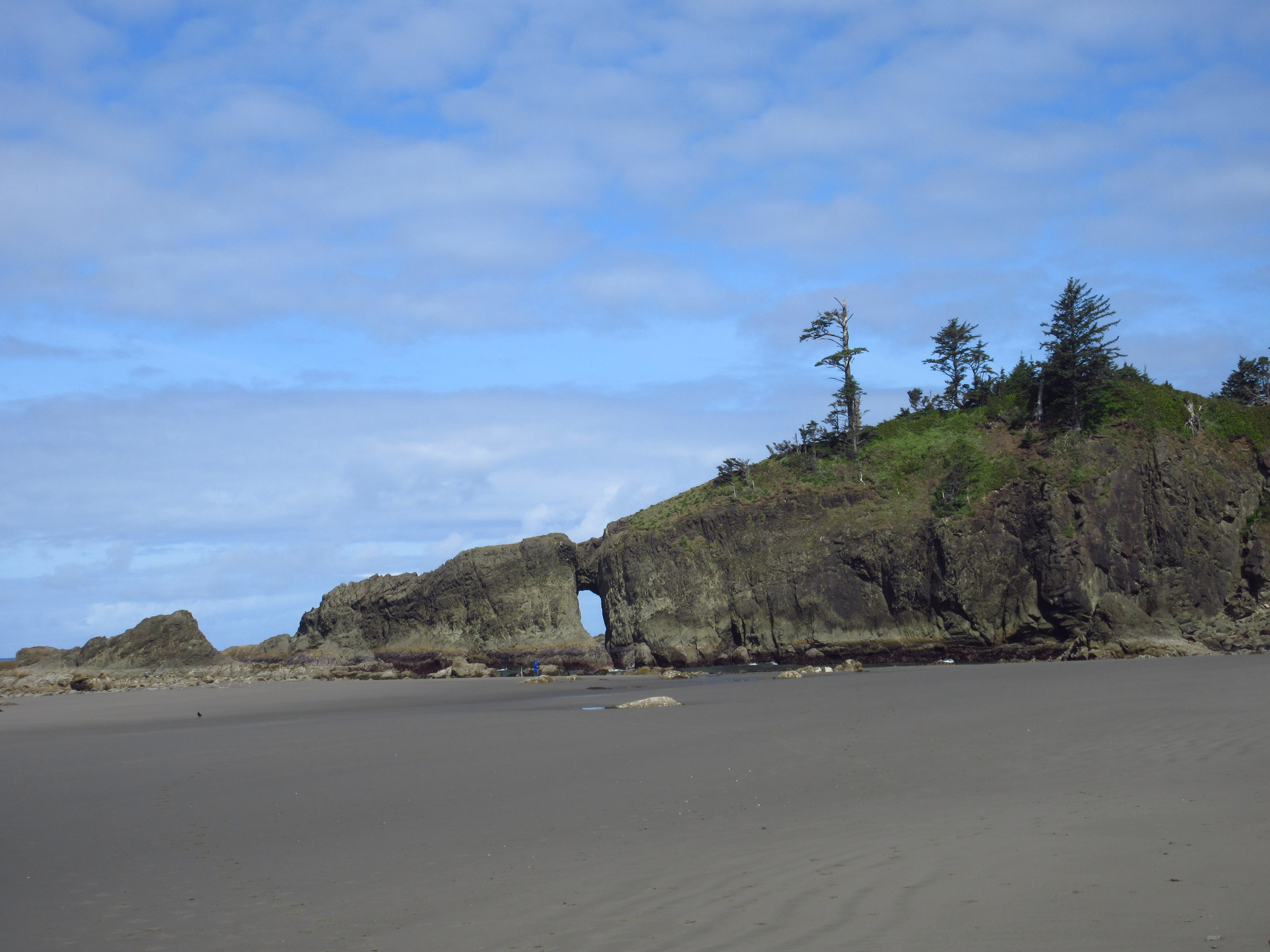
Second Beach

Trails to Second Beach (47.8839°N 124.6155°W) start at the Quileute Indian Reservation, and span 1 mile (1.6 km) before reaching the coast. Second Beach is the longest and flattest of the three beaches and is the most populated. Though within a mile of First and Third Beach in each direction, north and south, the other beaches are inaccessible because of protruding headlands and steep bluffs. 0.5 miles (0.80 km) offshore is an archipelago. Sea stacks are mixed throughout the small islands and are known as the Quileute Needle. They are part of a wildlife preserve called Quillayute Needles National Wildlife Refuge. The wildlife protects coastal creatures including seabirds, oystercatchers, and gulls.

=== Third Beach ===
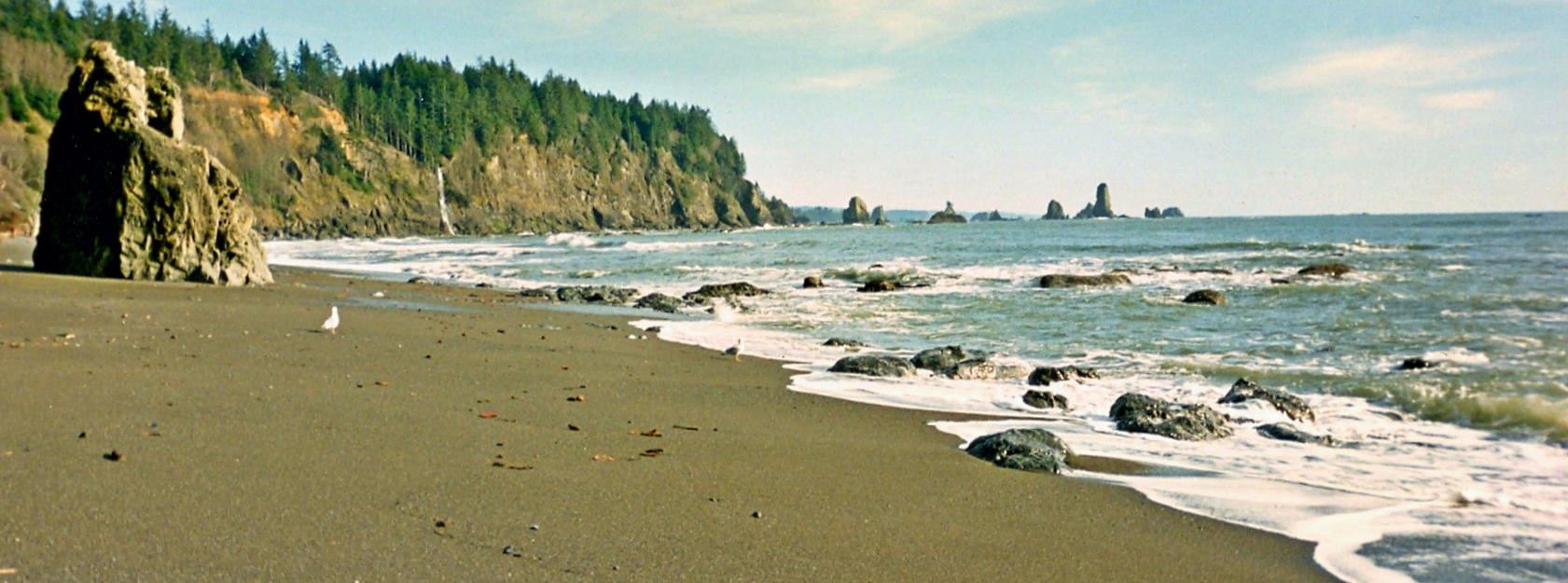
Third Beach

Third Beach (47.8761°N 124.5823°W), the southernmost beach, is a 1.6-mile (2.6 km) hike from the road with views of Strawberry Bay. The hike is mostly level but can sometimes be slippery and somewhat dangerous due to the harsh coast weather. Third Beach is one of the Olympic Peninsula beaches which tend to consist of sea stacks and driftwood. In the isolated non-developed cove at Taylor Point, there is a waterfall that falls directly onto the beach where tide pools are also featured on the north end. It is located on Olympic National Park's Pacific Ocean coastline, reached by a trail through the forest from near the Quileute Indian Reservation town of La Push.

Being the Third Beach down La Push' coastline, it is the most secluded. However, there are multiple camp sites that put campers within 5 minutes' walk of the ocean where Teahwhit Head blocks the way to Second Beach. There is also a boiler in the swamp by the 1.5 miles (2.4 km) trail to the beach from an abortive oil exploration in 1902.

== In popular culture ==
La Push Beach was referred in the film Twilight, it's a place where Bella Swan and her friends went.

== See also ==
- North America
