= Quileute Indian Reservation =

Coordinates: 47°54′23″N 124°37′30″W

Quileute Indian Reservation kʷòʔlí·yot̓ilo t̕siḳ̓áti
- Indian reservation
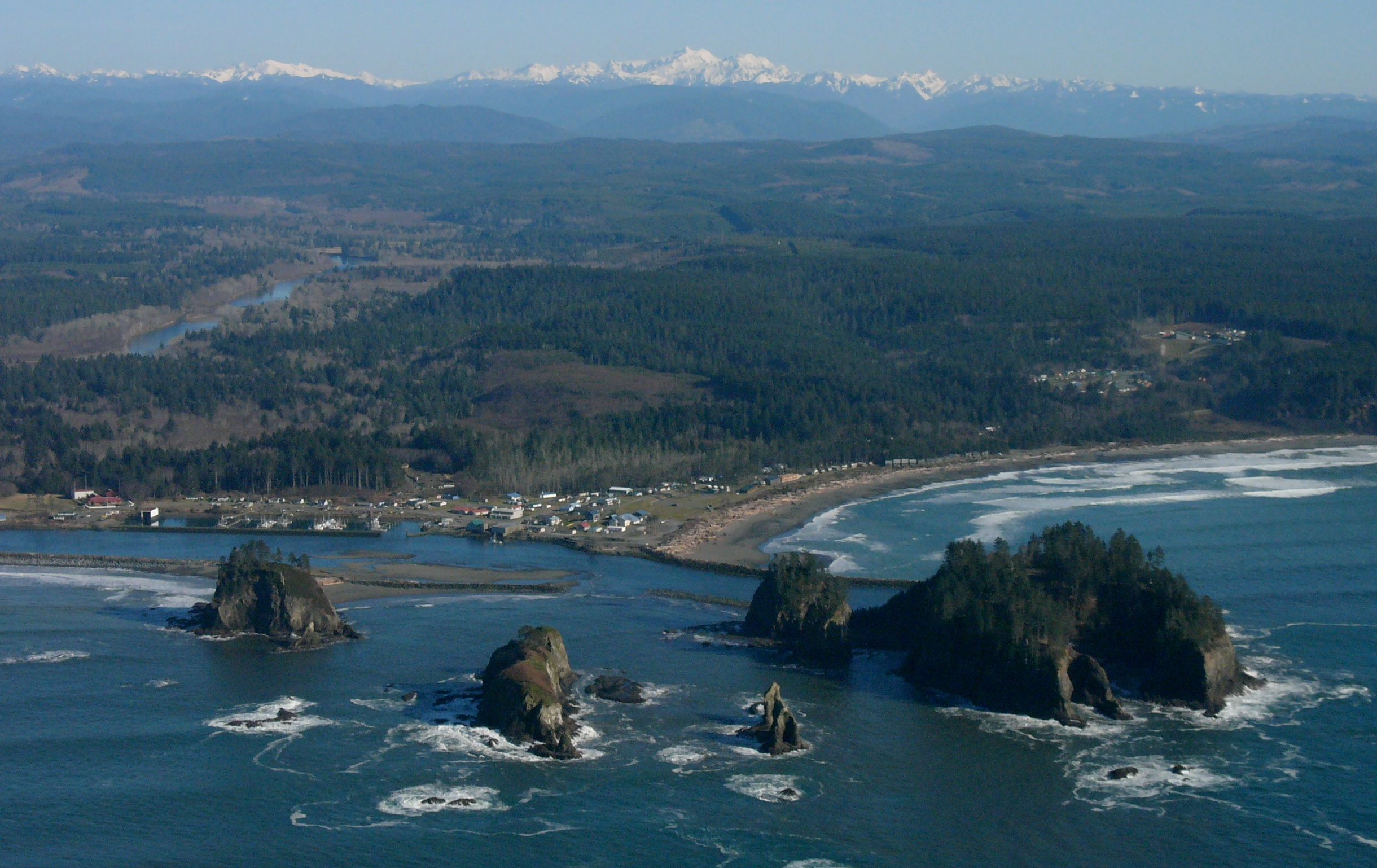
- Aerial view of La Push and James Island

- Location of the Quileute Indian Reservation
- Tribe: Quileute
- Country: United States
- State: Washington

Area
  - Total: 4.061 km^{2} (1.568 sq mi)
- Website: Quileute Tribe

The Quileute Indian Reservation (Quileute: kʷòʔlí·yot̓ilo t̕siḳ̓áti) is an Indian reservation for the Quileute people located on the northwestern Olympic Peninsula near the southwestern corner of Clallam County, Washington, United States. The reservation is at the mouth of the Quillayute River on the Pacific coast.

La Push, Washington is the reservation's main population center. The 2000 census reported an official resident population of 371 people on the reservation, which has a land area of 4.061 km^{2} (1.5678 sq mi, or 1,003.4 acres).

== History ==
Historically, the Quileute people occupied a large portion of the Olympic Peninsula, stretching from the Quillayute River north to the lands of the Makah, and as far east as the headwaters of the Sol Duc and Hoh rivers. The Quileutes signed the Quinault Treaty of 1855, however, they felt wronged by the treaty, as they did not realize that the treaty would include the total cession of their lands. The wording of the treaty was "deliberately vauge", only specifying that "There shall … be reserved … a tract or tracts of land sufficient for their wants within the Territory of Washington … and hereafter surveyed or located and set apart for their exclusive use."

The intent of the government to concentrate all these Indians on the Quinault Reservation under the Treaty of 1856 was clear, but the charge that the Quileute continued to live at La Push in violation of the treaty was largely nullified by the fact that the government failed to set aside the proposed reservation at Quinault until November 4, 1873, almost twenty years later, and from the records it is doubtful that the Quileute ever received the full annuity payments to which they were entitled, because of their isolation and the difficulty of getting treaty goods to them. In any event, their cause was championed by the local Indian agents and by the Office of Indian Affairs. Finally, in response to the argument that the attempt to move the Quileute to the Quinault Reservation was a mistake, the President of the United States issued an executive order on February 19, 1889, setting aside a new reservation about one mile square, at the mouth of the Quillayute River.

In 1966, James Island was removed from surrounding Quillayute Needles National Wildlife Refuge by the U.S. Department of the Interior, and returned to the Quileute when the island was discovered to be part of the Quileute Indian Reservation. In the 2000s, the tribal government petitioned the U.S. government for other land transfers, in particular to rebuild homes away from the coastline's tsunami hazard zone. On February 27, 2012, President Barack Obama signed HR1162 into law, giving the tribe 785 acres (318 ha) of Olympic National Park to move the tribal school and other facilities out of the tsunami zone. Construction of the new school was completed in 2022.

== Government ==
The Quileute have their own government, consisting of a tribal council with staggered terms. The current tribal council consists of: Carol Hatch (chair), Tony Foster (vice-chair), DeAnna Hobson (secretary), and Anna Rose Counsell (treasurer).
