= Raft River (Washington) =

- Location of the mouth of the Raft River in Washington

Location
- Country: United States
- State: Washington
- County: Grays Harbor

Physical characteristics
- Source: Confluence of Crane Creek and Lunch Creek
  - location: Quinault Reservation
  - coordinates: 47°27′14″N 124°10′2″W
  - elevation: 187 ft (57 m)
- 2nd source: North Fork Raft River
  - location: Olympic Mountains
  - coordinates: 47°30′47″N 124°3′29″W
  - elevation: 1,245 ft (379 m)
- Mouth: Pacific Ocean
  - location: Tunnel Island
  - coordinates: 47°27′42″N 124°20′34″W
  - elevation: 0 ft (0 m)
- Length: 20.5 mi (33.0 km)

The Raft River is a stream located entirely within the Quinault Indian Reservation in Grays Harbor County, on the Olympic Peninsula, in the U.S. state of Washington. The river and its tributaries flow west from the Olympic Mountains and empty into the Pacific Ocean. It is situated a few miles north of the Quinault River and a few miles south of the Queets River.

== Course ==
The Raft River originates at the confluence of Crane Creek and Lunch Creek, which flow southwest from the Olympic Mountains. The Raft River flows west for about 11.5 mi (18.5 km), gathering tributaries such as the South Fork and North Fork Raft River, until emptying into the Pacific Ocean. Crane Creek is the longer of the two source tributaries, which at about 5.5 mi (8.9 km) brings the total to about 17 mi (27 km).

Crane Creek is joined by Cedar Creek just before Crane and Lunch Creek join, forming the main stem Raft River. Crane, Cedar, and Lunch Creek all flow southwest from the Olympic Mountains. Lunch Creek is joined by Meadow Creek shortly before meeting the Raft River. Less than a mile below Lunch Creek the Raft River is joined from the south by the South Fork Raft River. The South Fork begins a few miles to the south in a wetland called O'Took Prairie. Continuing west the Raft River is joined by a couple small streams and then, from the south, Hoh Creek. After a few more miles the Raft River is joined, from the north, by the North Fork Raft River.

The North Fork Raft River originates in the Olympic Mountains very near the Quinault Reservation boundary. It is the longest tributary at about 17.5 mi (28.2 km). The total length of the North Fork and the mainstem Raft River below the confluence is about 20.5 mi (33.0 km). The North Fork Raft River collects various tributaries including Wolf Creek and its tributaries Trail Creek and Swede Creek.

Below the North Fork confluence the Raft River is joined by Red Creek and then Rainy Creek. In this reach the river meanders through a floodplain about 3,000 ft (910 m) wide. The river channel is about 90 ft (27 m) wide, expanding to over 300 ft (91 m) at river bends.

The Raft River empties emptying into the Pacific Ocean at a sea stack called Tunnel Island and a cluster of smaller stacks, one of which is called Elephant Rock. Elephant Rock was named for its arch which gave it the appearance of an elephant. However the "trunk" part of the arch collapsed in 2016.

The lowermost 1.19 mi (1.92 km) of the Raft River is a tidally-influenced estuary.

== Environment ==
Most of the Raft River's drainage basin consists of low hills and plateaus. Much of it has been clear-cut in recent decades.

The Raft River and its tributaries support chum salmon and coho salmon spawning. Limited Chinook salmon spawning occurs in the main stem Raft River. The river also supports salmonid populations of bull trout and steelhead trout. Other fauna found in the Raft River watershed include bald eagles, peregrine falcons, spotted owls, and many others.

The Raft River's estuary, where tides mix salt and fresh water, is a unique area that is culturally important to the Quinault Indian Nation. Although not as large or complex as the nearby Queets River estuary, the Raft River's estuary is extensive and supports varied habitats. Being accessible mainly by foot it remains relatively pristine, although there is some evidence of access by ATVs and there is some non-native European beach grass. Access to the estuary and beaches is not allowed to non-tribal members unless accompanied by a Tribal representative.

The surficial geology of most of the Raft River's drainage basin is glacial outwash, with the estuary being more recent alluvium.

The river's estuary and lower reach, up to the North Fork, is in a tsunami hazard zone.

== Tributaries ==
In upstream hierarchical order the main tributaries of the Raft River are:

- Rainy Creek
- Red Creek
- North Fork Raft River
  - Wolf Creek
    - Trail Creek
      - Swede Creek
- Hoh Creek
- South Fork Raft River
- Lunch Creek
  - Meadow Creek
- Crane Creek
  - Cedar Creek

== See also ==
- List of rivers of Washington (state)
