= Quinault Treaty =

1855 land acquisition treaty between the U.S. and the Quinault and Quileute tribes

The Quinault Treaty (also known as the Quinault River Treaty and the Treaty of Olympia) was a treaty agreement between the United States and the Native American Quinault and Quileute tribes located in the western Olympic Peninsula north of Grays Harbor, in the recently formed Washington Territory. The treaty was signed on 1 July 1855, at the Quinault River, and on 25 January 1856 at Olympia, the territorial capital. It was ratified by Congress on 8 March 1859, and proclaimed law on April 11, 1859.

Signatories included Isaac Stevens, superintendent of Indian affairs and governor of Washington Territory, and representatives of the Quinault and Quileute, as well as the Hoh tribe, which was considered a subset of the Quileutes. The Quinault Indian Reservation was established under the terms of the treaty. Indian signatories included the Quinault Head Chief Taholah and Sub-chiefs Wah-kee-nah, Yer-ay-let'l, and Kne-she-guartsh, the Quileute Head Chief How-yat'l and Sub-chiefs Kal-lape, Tah-ah-ha-wht'l, along with other tribal delegates.

== Context ==
The Quinault Treaty was one of the last of several signed during Washington Territory's first decade. Acquiring land cession from the Native Americans was one of Isaac Stevens' primary goals as the first governor of the territory. Other similar cession treaties Stevens negotiated in the 1850s include the Treaty of Medicine Creek, Treaty of Hellgate, Treaty of Neah Bay, Treaty of Point Elliott, and the Point No Point Treaty.

The Quinault Treaty continued Isaac Stevens policy of consolidating tribes, often requiring tribes to move far from their homeland to a reservation to be occupied by several unrelated tribes. While not taking this policy as far as the Treaty of Point No Point did, the Quinault Treaty resulted in the establishment of the Quinault Reservation in the Quinault homeland but required the Quileute and Hoh to move there, although few did.

== Negotiations ==
The treaty negotiations were conducted in Chinook Jargon, which, according to Paul Prucha, was "a lingua franca along the Pacific Northwest coast but hardly an effective tool for sensitive negotiations, for it had a vocabulary of only about 500 words, and a single word might be used to translate a number of different English words."

The final treaty contained 13 articles. The first described the land being ceded to the United States, which was defined as bounded by the Pacific Ocean to the west, the southern boundary of the recent Makah cession to the north, which ran east to "the middle of the coast range of mountains" (meaning the Olympic Mountains). The eastern cession boundary ran south "with said range" (the Olympics) to the ridge dividing the drainage basins of the Chehalis River and the Quinault River. From there the line ran west along the watershed ridge to the Pacific Ocean. This somewhat vague definition was further confused by the way the Makah cession boundary had been defined as extending south to the lands occupied by the Quileute. This circular definition, along with the unclear phrases about where the line ran through the Olympics, resulted in confusion and legal problems which continue to the present day.

The second article of the treaty described how the reservation would be established and that the tribes would be required to move there. Article three promised the tribes the right of fishing "in all usual and accustomed grounds and stations is secured to said Indians in common with all citizens of the Territory". Hunting, gathering, and the pasturing of horses were also protected with certain provision. In article four the United States promised to pay $25,000 for the land cession, to be paid over a number of years. Article five provides an additional $2,500 to enable tribes to remove and settle upon the reservation. Article six described how the president could any future time and "as he deems fit" make a new reservation elsewhere and requires the tribes to move there, or require the tribes to be consolidated with other tribes on another reservation, with all federal annuities also consolidated. The president could also cause the reservation to be subdivided into lots and assigned to individuals and families. Articles seven and nine dealt with the prohibition of alcohol and debts. Article eight required the tribes to "acknowledge their dependence on the United States", and briefly outlined how crimes would be dealt with. In article ten the United States promised to establish and support for 20 years an agricultural and industrial school, free to the children of the tribes and located at the territorial central Puget Sound agency. A physician was also to be provided, also at the central agency. Article eleven required the tribes to free any slaves they held. Article thirteen forbid the tribes from trading "at Vancouver's Island or elsewhere outside the dominion of the United States", nor to allow "foreign Indians" to live in the reservation. The last article said that the terms of the treaty would take effect upon ratification by the President and the Senate.

== After the treaty ==
Most of the Quileute and Hoh refused to move to the Quinault Reservation once it was established. Both received small reservations of their own. The Hoh Reservation was established by President Grover Cleveland by Executive Order on 11 September 1893. The reservation is only 443 acres (1.79 km^{2}), but includes about a mile of the Pacific coastline south of the mouth of the Hoh River.

== Interpretation ==
In mapping Indian land cession the Washington Department of Fish and Wildlife had to make some guesses and assumptions about the cession boundaries. The line between the Quinault and Makah cession was assumed to extend from current day Cape Alava due east to a watershed divide separating streams flowing north to the Strait of Juan de Fuca and streams flowing to the Pacific. The phrases "to the middle of the coast range of mountains" and "to the summit of the coast-range of mountains" were assumed to mean the dividing crest of the Olympic Mountains separating the Pacific, Juan de Fuca, and Hood Canal drainage basins. The phrase "thence southerly with said range of mountains to their intersection with the dividing ridge between the Chehalis and Quiniatl [sic] Rivers; thence westerly with said ridge to the Pacific coast" required further assumptions. The Fish and Wildlife project assumed the "southerly" line was to follow the main drainage divide between the Pacific and Hood Canal. This interpretation of the treaty is just one of many possible and holds no legal weight. The Fish and Wildlife Department writes, "These boundaries are clearly the product of much conjecture and assumption."

== See also ==
- List of treaties
