= La Push, Washington =

Unincorporated community in Washington, United States

La Push, Washington Kʷoʔlí·yot̓ (Quileute)
- Unincorporated community
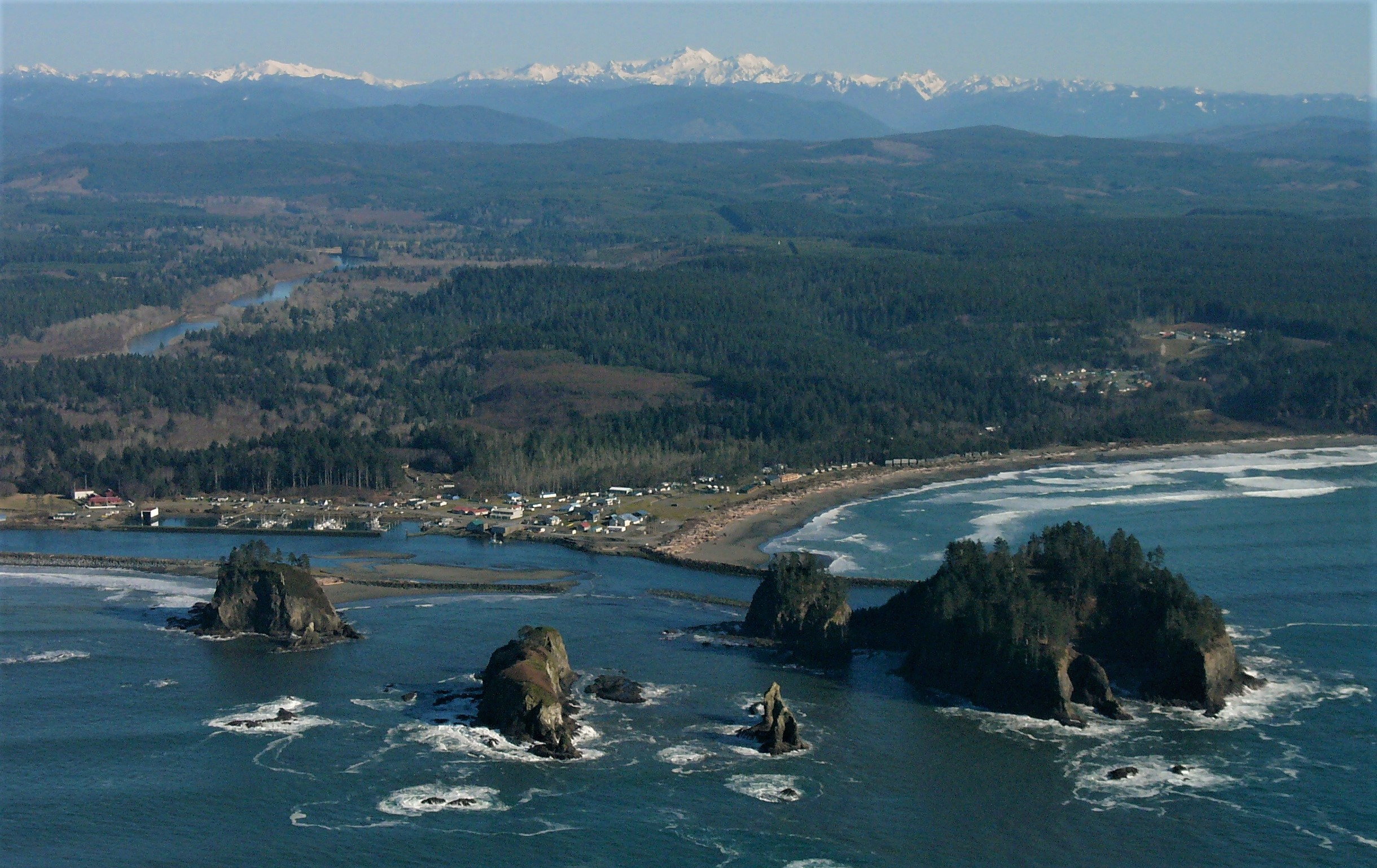
- La Push and James Island

- Location within Washington (state) Location within the United States
- Coordinates: 47°54′31″N 124°38′12″W
- Country: United States
- State: Washington
- Reservation: Quileute
- Elevation: 23 ft (7.0 m)

Population (2000)
  - Total: 371
- Time zone: UTC-8 (Pacific (PST))
  - Summer (DST): UTC-7 (PDT)
- ZIP code: 98350
- GNIS feature ID: 1531473

La Push (Quileute: Kʷoʔlí·yot̓) is a small unincorporated community situated at the mouth of the Quillayute River in the Western Olympic Peninsula. It is the de facto capital and main population center of the Quileute Indian Reservation, which is home to the federally recognized Quileute tribe. La Push is known for its whale-watching and natural environment. The community has historically been located on the coast; however, sea level rise led the community to begin managed retreat to higher grounds in 2017.

== History ==
=== Etymology ===
The name La Push is from French term, La Bouche, meaning "The Mouth" of the Quillayute River, adapted into Chinook Jargon.

=== Quileute Tribe history ===
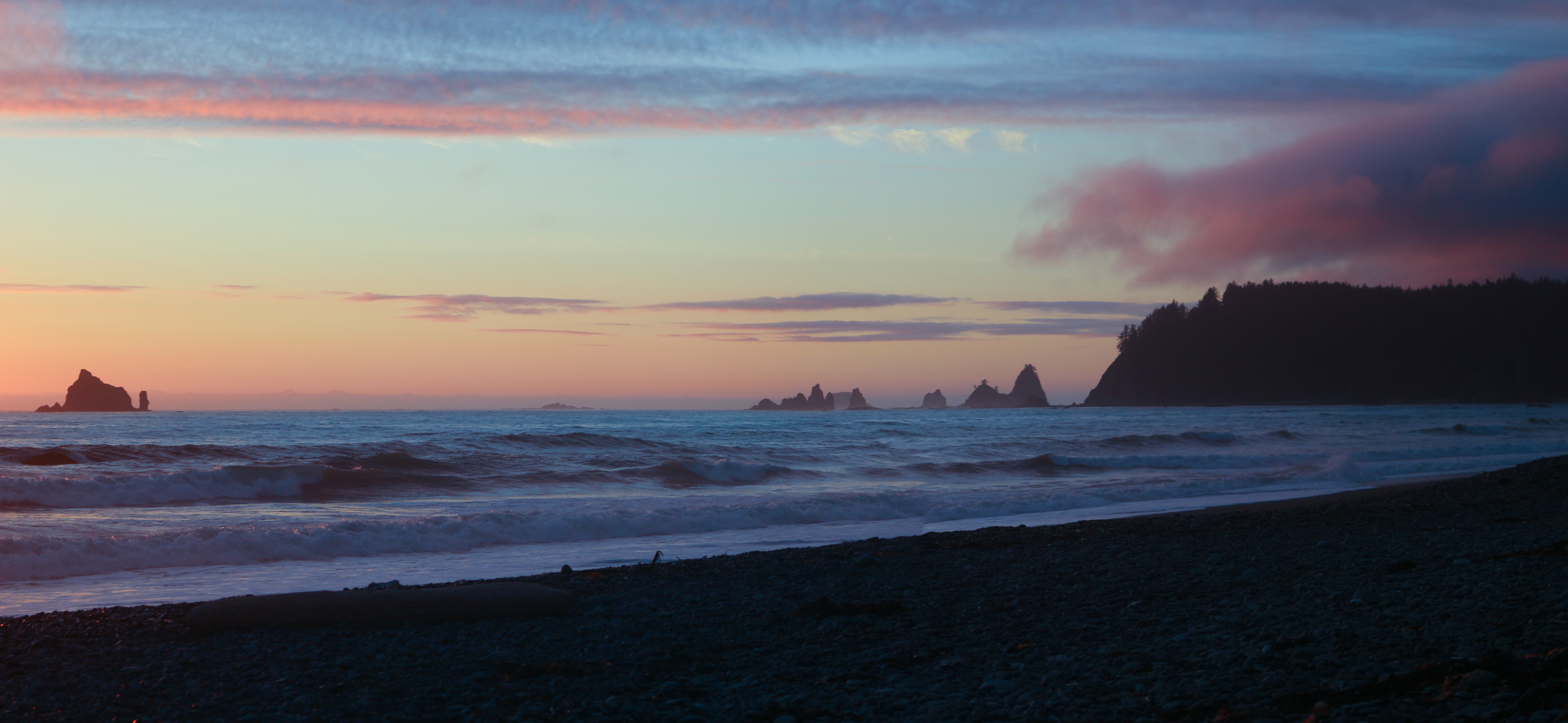
Sunset in La Push

La Push, 14 miles from Forks, is home to the Quileute Tribe. Tribal members traditionally built cedar canoes for a variety of uses; they ranged in size from two-man to ocean-going freight vessels capable of carrying three tons. The Quileute ranked second only to the Makah as whalers and first among all the tribes as seal hunters. They bred special woolly-haired dogs and spun and wove their hair into prized warm blankets. According to traditional stories, the Quileutes' only kin, the Chimakum, were separated from them by a great flood that swept them to the Quimper Peninsula on the other side of the North Olympic Peninsula. There they were attacked and destroyed in the 1860s by Chief Seattle and the Suquamish Tribe.

Their first treaty with the United States occurred in 1855, when the Quileutes signed a treaty with representatives of the governor of the Washington Territory, Isaac Stevens. A treaty a year later would have moved them to a reservation in Taholah, but the Quileute territory was so remote that it was not enforced. In February 1889, an executive order by President Grover Cleveland established a one-mile square reservation at La Push. At the time the town had 252 inhabitants. Later in 1889, arsonists destroyed La Push while villagers were picking hops in Puyallup.

=== La Push relocation ===
Work began in 2017 to relocate the village to higher ground. The plan was to reduce damage from tsunamis and flooding that might result from a higher sea level caused by climate change. The plan required modification of the boundaries of the Olympic National Park. The first building that was moved was the K-12 school.

== Geography ==
Two beaches are near La Push, Rialto Beach to the north of the river mouth and La Push Beach to the south.

The closest incorporated city to La Push is Forks, Washington.

La Push has the westernmost ZIP Code in the contiguous United States, 98350.

=== Climate ===
La Push has a very wet oceanic climate. The climate is moderated and strongly influenced by the Pacific Ocean, which renders mild winters for a northerly latitude. Located to the west of the Olympic Mountains, La Push and the surrounding coastline absorb considerable rainfall dropped along the mountain front. The warmest month is August and the coolest month is December.

Climate data for La Push, Washington
Month	Jan	Feb	Mar	Apr	May	Jun	Jul	Aug	Sep	Oct	Nov	Dec	Year
Record high °F (°C)	69 (21)	73 (23)	72 (22)	83 (28)	92 (33)	96 (36)	97 (36)	99 (37)	98 (37)	90 (32)	82 (28)	76 (24)	99 (37)
Mean daily maximum °F (°C)	47 (8)	50 (10)	51 (11)	55 (13)	60 (16)	64 (18)	68 (20)	69 (21)	67 (19)	59 (15)	51 (11)	46 (8)	57 (14)
Daily mean °F (°C)	41 (5)	42 (6)	44 (7)	46 (8)	51 (11)	55 (13)	59 (15)	60 (16)	57 (14)	50 (10)	44 (7)	40 (4)	49 (10)
Mean daily minimum °F (°C)	35 (2)	35 (2)	36 (2)	38 (3)	42 (6)	47 (8)	50 (10)	50 (10)	47 (8)	41 (5)	38 (3)	35 (2)	41 (5)
Record low °F (°C)	7 (−14)	11 (−12)	19 (−7)	23 (−5)	29 (−2)	33 (1)	38 (3)	36 (2)	28 (−2)	23 (−5)	5 (−15)	7 (−14)	5 (−15)
Average precipitation inches (mm)	14.5 (370)	11.0 (280)	11.2 (280)	7.7 (200)	5.1 (130)	3.3 (84)	2.2 (56)	2.6 (66)	4.6 (120)	10.5 (270)	14.7 (370)	14.5 (370)	101.9 (2,596)

== Arts and culture ==
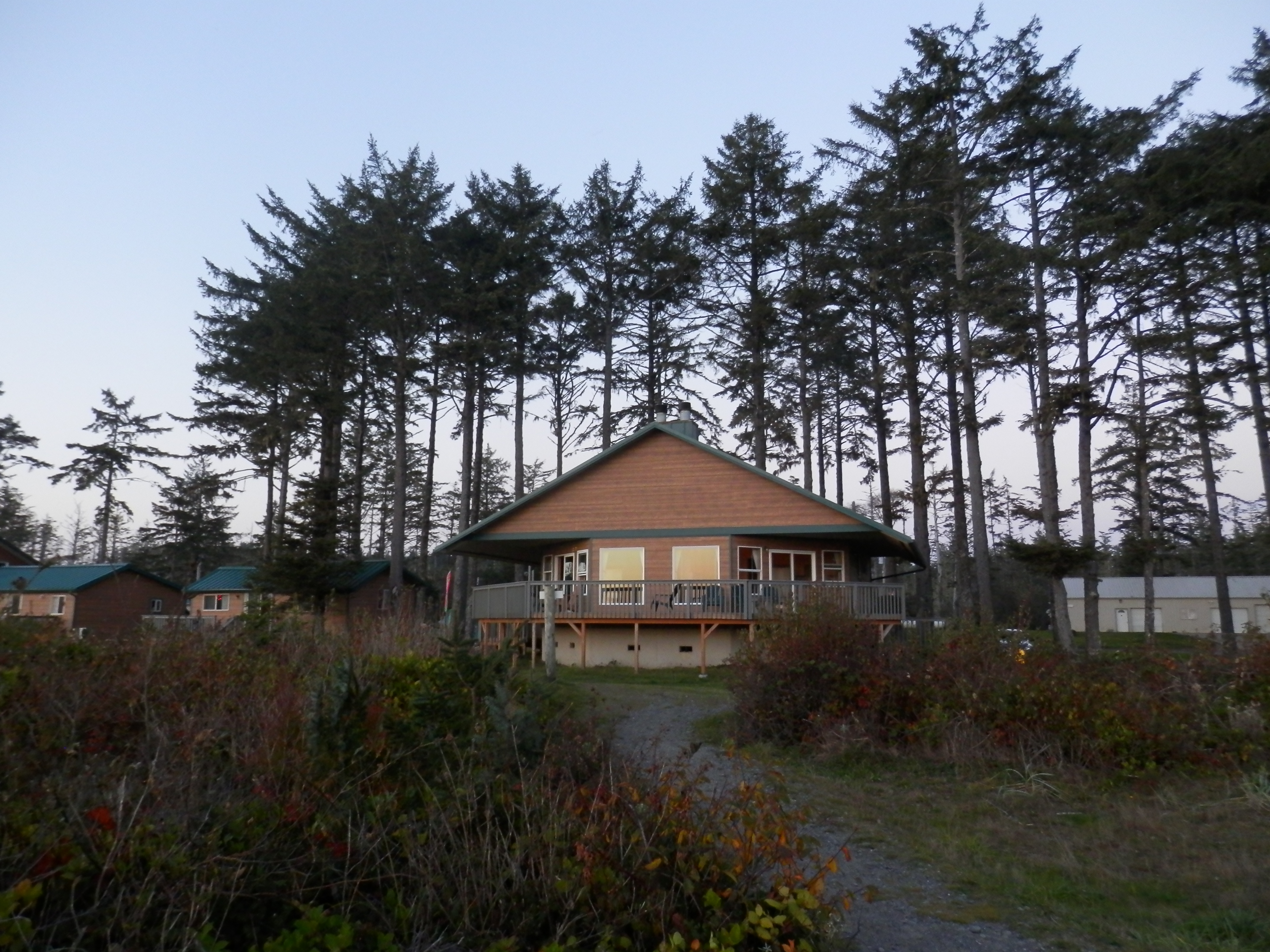
Cabin at Resort in La Push

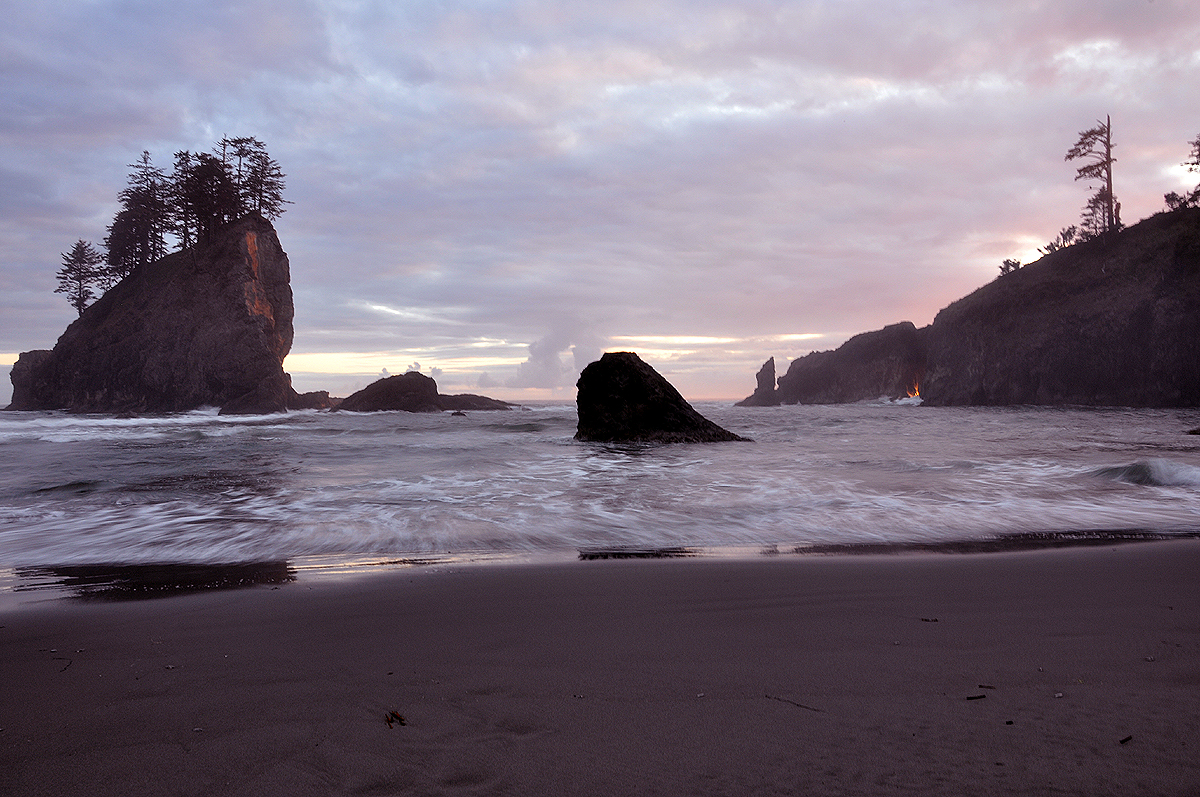
La Push, Second Beach at Dusk

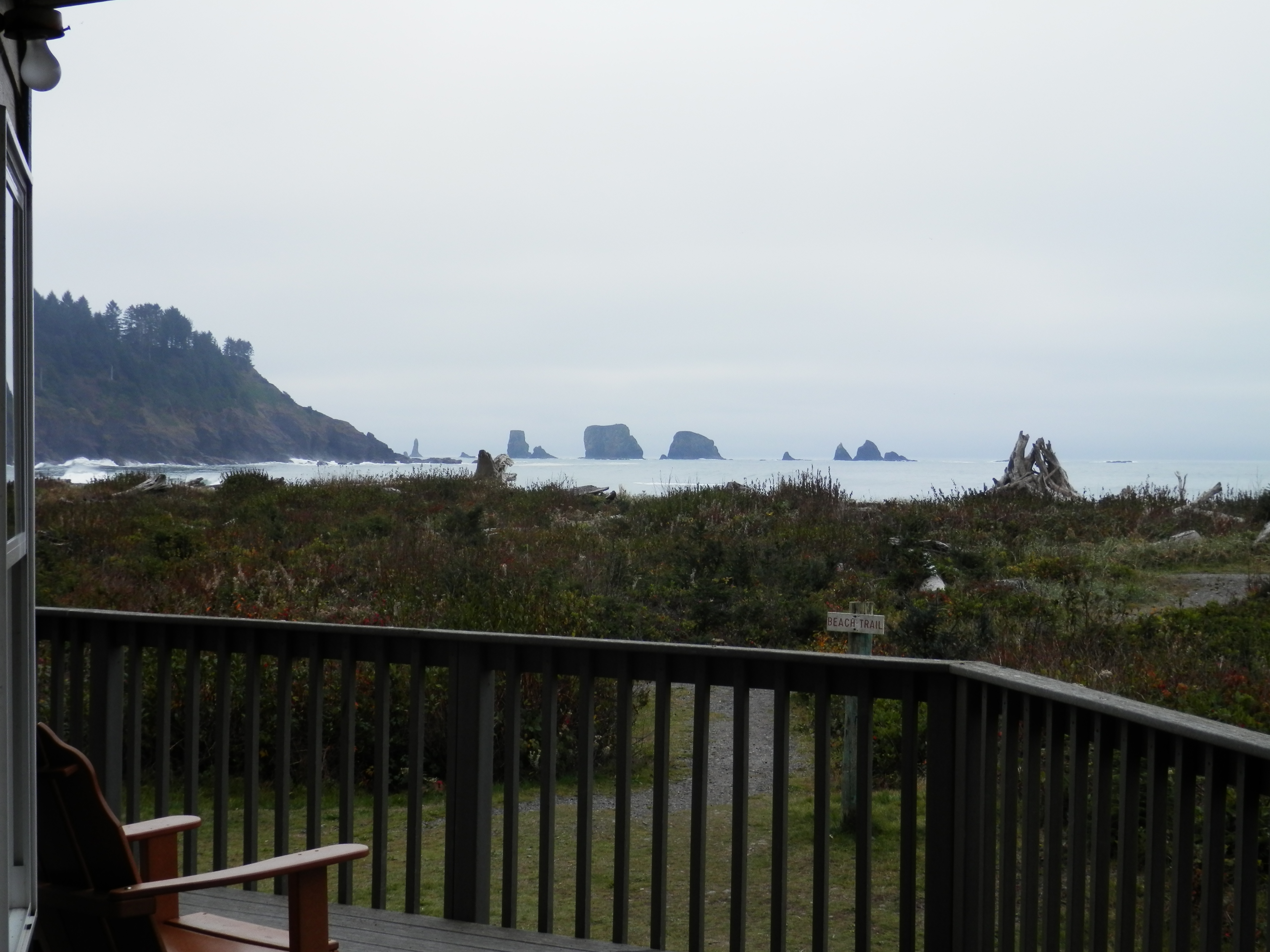
A view from one of La Push's cabins at the Quileute Oceanside Resort.

=== Culture ===
La Push is a village of the Quileute Tribe. All of the businesses are owned by the tribe. The Quileute Tribe has revived many of its traditional skills and crafts, which are taught at school along with the Quileute language. It is a language isolate, unrelated to any root language in the world, and one of only five in the world without nasal sounds.

=== Festivals and events ===
The popular Quileute Days take place July 17–19 in La Push. The tribal celebration, which is a synthesis of cultural heritage and modern lifestyle, includes a fireworks display, a traditional salmon bake, dancing and songs, field sports, a horseshoe tournament, arts and craft display, and food concessions.

=== Tourism and recreation ===
In the 21st century, La Push has oceanfront resorts, a seafood company, fish hatchery, and a revamped marina. Since the early 21st century, the tribe has grown more interested in tourism.

The Pacific Northwest National Scenic Trail passes through La Push on the way to its western terminus at Cape Alava.

La Push garners a good amount of tourism partially due to the success of the Twilight novel series in which the town is one of the primary locations, and in which the Quileute Tribe and their traditions are incorporated.

== Education ==
La Push was the location of the K-12 Quileute Tribal School until 2022 when the school was relocated elsewhere in the reservation as part of the Move to Higher Ground initiative.
