= Quileute =

Native American people in Washington (state)

kʷòʔlí·yot̓
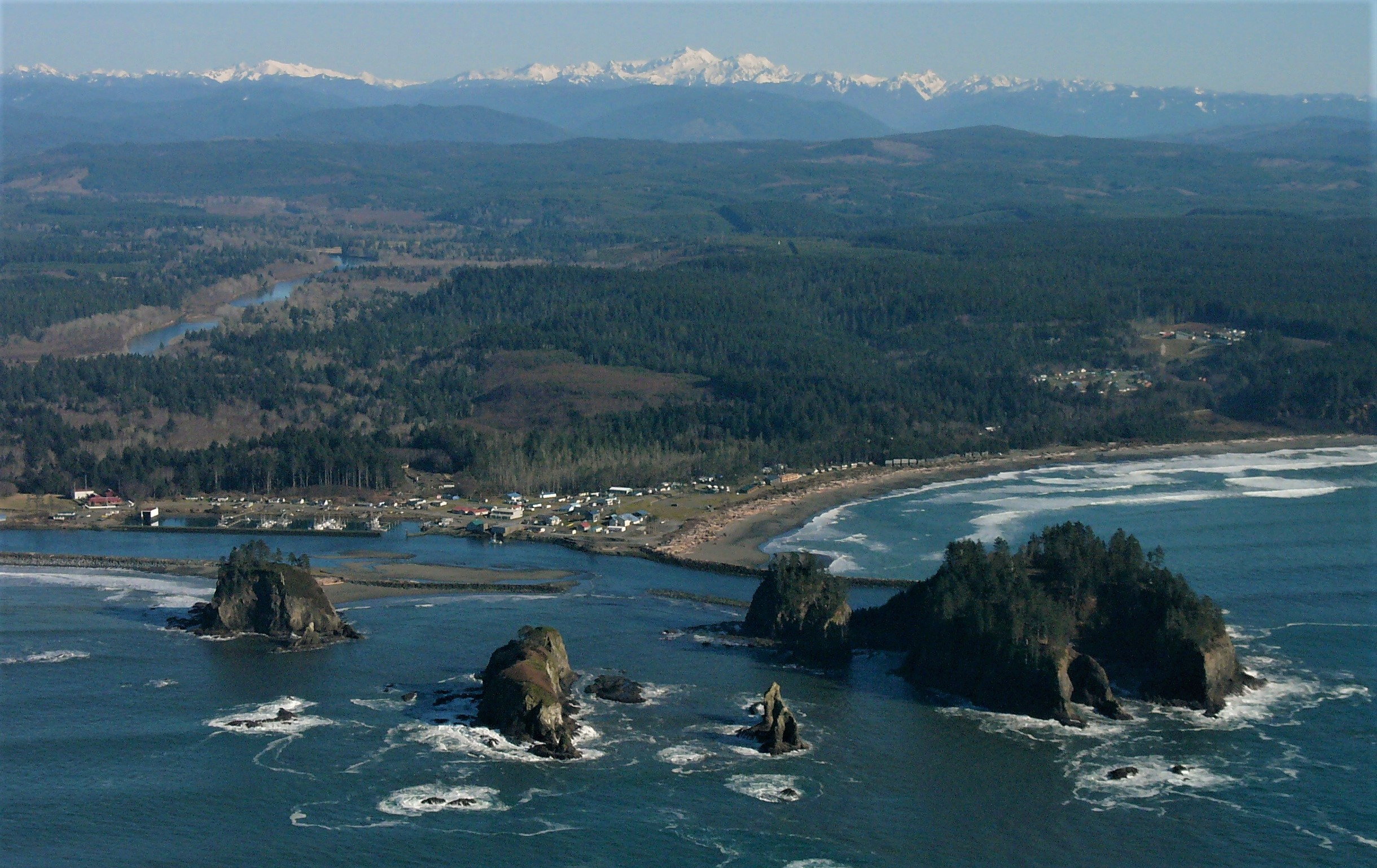
- Aerial view of La Push, the de facto capital of the Quileute Tribe

Total population
- 808 (2018)

Regions with significant populations
- Washington (United States)

Languages
- English, historically Quileute

Religion
- Christianity, including the Indian Shaker Church; traditional folk religion

Related ethnic groups
- Hoh, Chemakum

- People: kʷòʔlí·yot̓
- Language: kʷòʔlí·yot̓ísk̓ʷa
- Country: kʷòʔlí·yot̓ilo t̕siḳ̓áti

The Quileute (/ˈkwɪliːuːt/; Quileute: kʷòʔlí·yot̓) are a Native American people indigenous to western Washington state in the United States. Quileute people are represented by the federally recognized Quileute Tribe. Some Quileute are enrolled in the federally recognized Quinault Indian Nation.

The Quileute have a long history of occupation on the Olympic Peninsula, with early sites dating back 9,000 years. In the 18th century, the Quileutes first encountered European traders, but contact was infrequent until 1855, when they were party to the Quinault Treaty with the United States. The Quileute agreed to cede their land and move to the Quinault Indian Reservation, however most remained in place. In 1889, the Quileute Reservation was established for the Quileute people at La Push. After the passage of the Indian Reorganization Act, the people of the Quileute Reservation formed the Quileute Tribe in 1936.

The Quileute people speak the Quileute language (kʷòʔlí·yot̓ísk̓ʷa), belonging to the Chimakuan language family. Only the extinct Chemakum language is related to Quileute.

Like many Northwest Coast nations, in precontact times the Quileute relied on fishing from local rivers and the Pacific Ocean for food. They built plank houses (longhouses) to protect themselves from the harsh, wet winters west of the Cascade Mountains.

== Name ==
The name Quileute is from kʷòʔlí·yot̓, their autonym in the Quileute language. Originally, it referred to the village site at what is today La Push. The literal meaning of the word is unclear.

Quillayute has sometimes been used locally (e.g. Quillayute River), and early anglicizations of the name kʷòʔlí·yot̓ also included Kwilléhiūt, Kwe-dée-tut, and Quilahutes.

== History ==
=== Precontact ===
According to Quileute oral history, the Quileutes were created from wolves by the Qwaeti the Transformer, known as Ḳ̓ʷá̱·ti in the Quileute language. They were then separated from their kin, the Chemakum, when a great flood washed the Chemakum away, depositing them at what is today Port Townsend.

The earliest-known evidence of habitation in the Quileute area dates back 8,000-9,000 years, comparable to the nearby Ozette site.

=== 18th and early 19th centuries ===
The Quileute and Hoh together were estimated to have a population of 500 in 1780. The Quileutes were faced with raids from other tribes, such as the Makah, in the 18th and 19th centuries. James Island (Quileute: alak̓ista) was commonly a site of refuge from these raiders, and it functioned both as a fort and a village after a mainland village was relocated to the island. Explorer John Meares described a fortified village in this location in his 1788 writings, and it would continue to be a deeply important part of Quileute culture.

European contact with the Quileute began in the late 18th century. According to Harry Hobucket, Spanish sailors who shipwrecked north of the mouth of the Quillayute River were likely the first Europeans they encountered. They were welcomed into the tribe, living with them for many years until they left to leave south in search of their own people. Several years after, a second wreck, probably a French ship, occurred near the same village and the crew was saved by the Quileute. They also lived with the Quileute for a time, showing the Quileute how to bake flour salvaged from the ship and marrying into Quileute families. It is from these people that the origin of the name "La Push" possibly comes, being from the French La Bouche, 'the mouth.' They also met the American captain Robert Gray, who traded with them in May of 1792 at their main settlement at La Push.

The last major battle that the Quileute participated in was at Grays Harbor, in which they fought against the Chinook and Clatsop. In 1808, a Russian vessel was shipwrecked near the mouth of the Quillayute River, and members of the ship were attacked and enslaved. A major famine occurred in the 1840s.

=== Quinault Treaty ===
The Quileute were party to the Quinault Treaty (a.k.a. the Treaty of Olympia or Quinault River Treaty), which was signed on January 25, 1856 by three Quileute men: Howyat'l, Kallape, and Tahahhawht'l. The Quileute agreed to cede their 800,000 acres of land and move to the Quinault Reservation, as well as reserving hunting, fishing, and gathering rights. However, the Quileute did not move to the reservation as agreed, instead remaining in their own lands. There continued to be strife between the settlers and the Quileutes. Settlers moving to Quileute country tried to establish "Quilehuyte County" in 1867 and asked the state to remove the Quileute to the reservation.

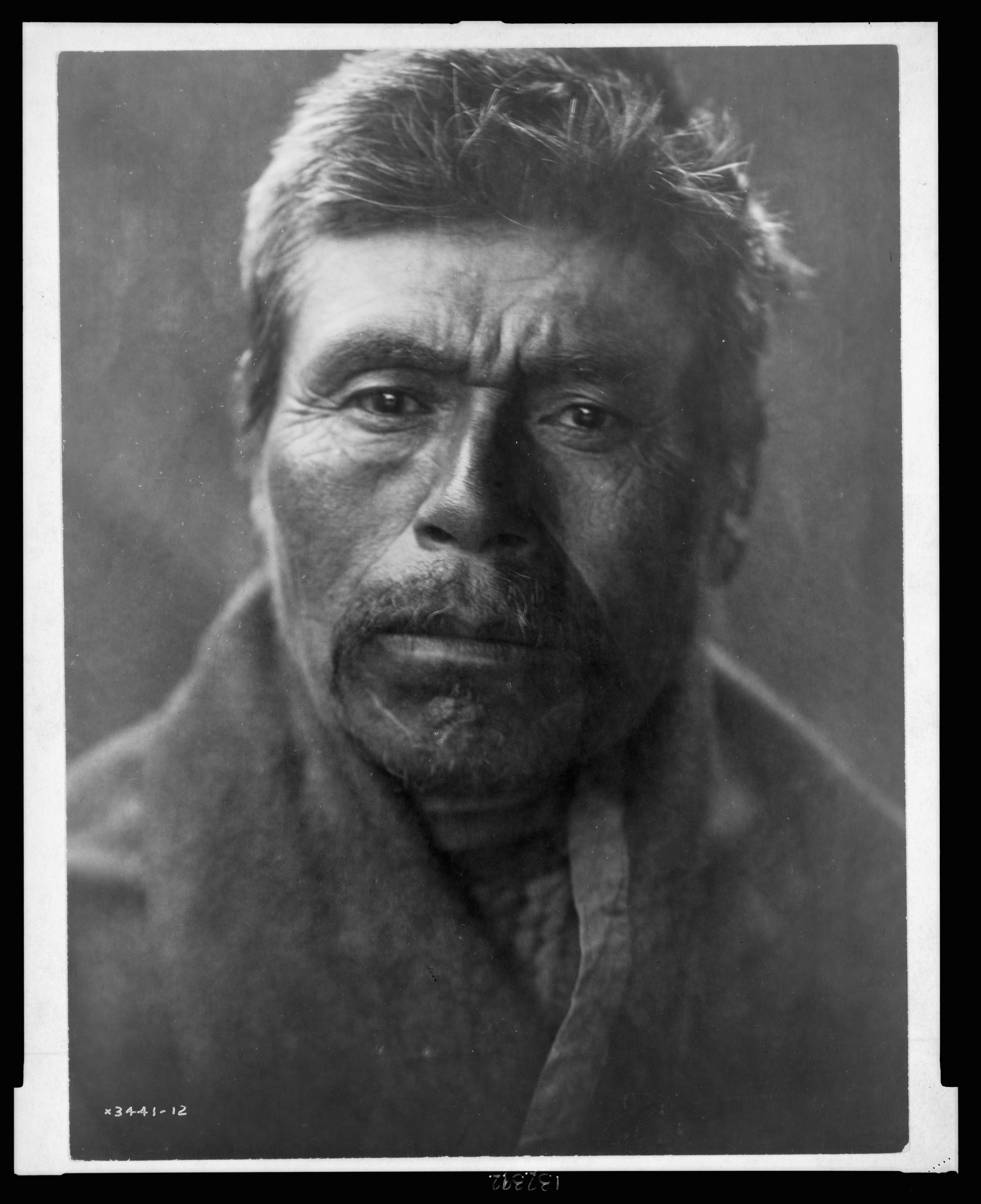
A Quileute man, photographed 1913 by Edward S. Curtis

=== Reservation era ===
In 1882, A.W. Smith came to La Push to "civilize" the Quileute. The first school was established a year later in 1883, where Smith began anglicizing Quileute names and renaming others after characters in the Bible and figures in American history. In 1888, there were estimated to be 64 Quileute.

On February 22, 1889, the Quileute Indian Reservation was created via executive order by President Benjamin Harrison. The same year, a settler who had wrongfully claimed the land at La Push burned down all twenty-six houses there, destryoing all Quileute cultural property from pre-contact days, such as sacred regalia, hunting equipment, baskets, and carved masks, except what had already been taken into private collections.

Quileutes were made eligible to claim allotments on the Quinault Reservation in 1904 by the Commissioner of Indian Affairs. This ruling was later reversed and then re-reversed by a 1911 congressional action, though lack of available land stopped allotments by 1913. In 1928, 165 Quileutes were given 80 acres each on the Quinault Reservation.

The Quileute Tribe was formally established in 1936 under the Indian Reorganization Act, when the tribe established their tribal constitution and bylaws. They were issued a corporate charter a year later in 1937. Though the Quileutes had received $25,000 in total with the Quinault, Queets, and Hoh, as stipulated in the treaty, the Quileute Tribe was further compensated in 1963 via the Indian Claims Commission for the lands they ceded under the treaty. The ICC awarded the Quileute Tribe and the Hoh Tribe a total of $112,152.60.

In 1985, there were 383 Quileutes in the Quileute Tribe.

In 2020, there were 404 Quileutes living on the Quileute Tribe Reservation.

== Culture ==
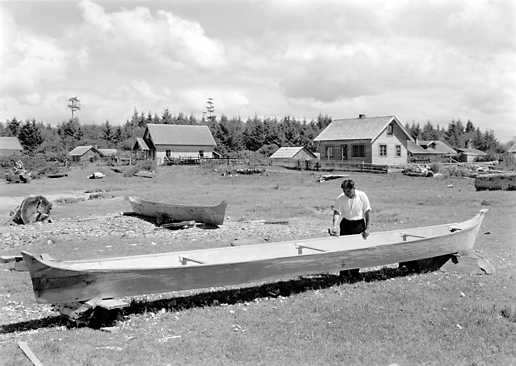
Making of a Quileute canoe in Olympic National Park, 1940.

=== Artwork and material culture ===
Historically the Quileute were talented builders and craftsmen. Like many other tribes in the region, they were boat and canoe makers. They could make canoes for whaling, which could hold tons of cargo and many men. They had cedar canoes ranging in size from small boats that could hold two people to giant vessels up to 58 metres (190 ft) long and capable of holding up to 6,000 pounds. The modern clipper ship's hull uses a design much like the canoes used by the Quileutes.

The Quileutes used the resources from the land to make tools and other items. In the region, almost everything was made out of wood. Necessities like utensils, clothing, weapons, and paints were made from the available natural resources. In terms of arts and crafts, the Quileute Tribe is best known for their woven baskets and dog-hair blankets. The tribe would raise specially bred, woolly dogs for their hair, which they would spin and weave into blankets. They would also weave incredibly fine baskets that were so tightly woven that they could hold water. They could boil water in some of them.

Using cedar bark, they made waterproof skirts and hats to shield their bodies against the heavy rainfall in the region.

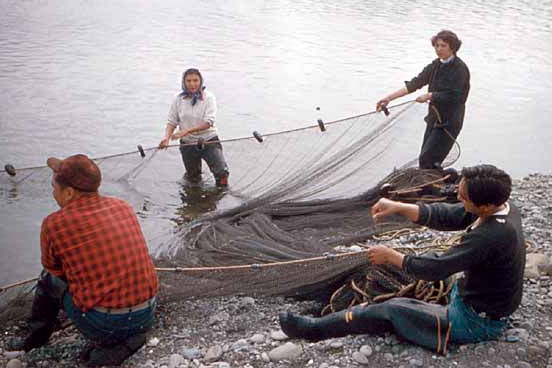
Net fishing on the Quileute Reservation, 1955

=== Foodways ===
The Pacific Ocean was the main source of subsistence for the Quileute in historic times. Fishing was the main subsistence activity and many fish were found in the waters of Quileute territory, including five species of salmon, steelheads, halibuts, smelts, trout, flounders, dogfish, and others. Octopodes and more than 50 species of shellfish were also collected by the Quileute. Today, many Quileute continue to make their livings from fishing, though unemployment has become a large problem among Quileutes. They also hunted whales and seals, likely having learned whaling from the neighboring Makah to the north.

The Quileute also hunted land animals, particularly deer and elk, typically with bow and arrow, traps, and snares, as well as birds and eggs.

The Quileute have extensive knowledge of the medicinal qualities of their homelands' flora. They use velvetleaf huckleberries, Vaccinium myrtilloides, by eating the uncooked berries, stewing the berries to make a sauce, and canning the berries and using them as food.

=== Religion and cosmology ===
Traditional Quileute beliefs revolve around the essence of the universe (t̕siḳ̓áti), the Creator-Transformer Qwaeti (Ḳ̓ʷá̱·ti), spirit powers (taxí·lit), and the ghosts of the dead (yalá·). Individuals claimed spirit powers through spirit questing or through adoption by a power.

Like other Northwest Coast cultures, Raven (bá·yaḳ) serves an important role in Quileute stories, though his role is diminished compared to other cultures' stories. The Quileute are the southernmost coastal people to include Raven as the trickster and culture hero. Other important figures include Ḳ̓ʷá̱·ti, Thunderbird (t̕íst̕ilal), the kelp-haired child-snatcher dásk̓iya, and a number of other monsters who affected the world.

Around 1895, the Indian Shaker Church came to Quileute country and was quickly adopted. It was embraced by Quileutes with such fervor that Indian agents advised limiting Shaker meetings to three two-hour sessions per week.

=== Language ===
The Quileute historically spoke the Quileute language (kʷòʔlí·yot̓ísk̓ʷa), which is one of two Chimakuan languages. Quileute is also spoken by the Hoh people, who are sometimes considered to be a Quileute band.

In 1999, the last native speaker of the Quileute language died and the language is considered to be dormant, although three or four users in their 50s retain some knowledge of vocabulary. Up until then, it was spoken only by tribal elders at La Push, and some of the Makah.

The Quileute Tribe is now trying to prevent the loss of the language by teaching it in the Quileute Tribal School, using books written for the students by the tribal elders. The Quileute Nation Culture and Language Committee released a language and culture app in 2021 in an effort to preserve the language and culture of their people. Efforts to introduce Quileute phrases into everyday life was started in 2007 through the Quileute Revitalization Project, by providing tribal members with accessible information on basic vocabulary words and phrases. The Quileute Nation has continued this project through downloadable alphabet sheets and providing audiobooks read in Quileute.

== Society ==
=== Historic social organization ===
In the 18th and 19th centuries, Quileute society was divided into three classes: hereditary chiefs and family heads, commoners, and slaves. Each village had two hereditary chiefs of equal power. Slaves were obtained through raids or in trade. Political life revolved around getting and maintaining family prestige and status. Social prestige gave rights to names, dances, songs, designs, and membership in secret societies.

=== Ceremonies ===
The Quileute had a number of ceremonial societies which functioned as dance fraternaties identified with occupational groups. Each society had a certain prestige. There were five such societies (listed in order of prestige): the Black Face Society for warriors, the fishermens' ritual, the hunters' society, the whalers' society, and the weathermens' society. The warrior society was also known as the Wolf ritual. The hunters' society was the oldest and of Quileute origin, while the weathermens' society was adopted from the Quinault and the songs belonging to this society were sung in Quinault. The other societies, the Black Face Society, the fishermens' ritual, and the whalers' society, were all adopted from the Makah. Membership in a society could be gained by showing evidence of owning a spirit power relevant to a certain society, or by buying membership by holding a potlatch. Initiations took place during the winter and typically included potlatches. Leadership in a society was a source of prestige.

The Quileute, like other Northwest Coast peoples, held potlatches. These ceremonies were originally held for many reasons, including celebrating birth, naming ceremonies, coming of age, inheritance, marriages, memorials to the dead, and as maintenance of property rights. Quileute potlatches typically lasted four to six days. Guests were reimbursed by the host according to their status, and the family holding the potlatch achieved status equivalent to the amount of wealth they gave away.

=== External relations ===
The Quileute engaged in both warfare and trade with neighboring tribes. They obtained trade goods such as dentalia and blankets from the Makah, which they traded to the southerly Quinault in return for salmon. After the arrival of European traders, they engaged in trade with them as well.

== Government ==
Quileute governance and political sovereignty is continued through the Quileute Tribe, a federally recognized tribe within the United States. The Quileute Tribe was officially established in 1936 following the passage of the Indian Reorganization Act.

The Quileute Tribe is headquartered in La Push, Washington, led by the Quileute Tribal Council, with five members, who are elected for three-year terms, that are staggered. In 2018, the tribe had 808 enrolled citizens.

The Quileute Tribe is governed by a democratically elected tribal council with five members who served in staggered, three-year terms. The tribe's current administration is:

- Chairman: Justin "Rio" Jaime
- Elder Vice-Chairman: Charles Woodruff
- Secretary: Skyler Foster
- Treasurer: Douglas Woodruff Jr.
- Member at Large: Stephanie Calderon

The General Manager is responsible for coordinating with the Tribal Programs, providing guidance and direction to the Business Enterprises, and direct supervision over the Administrative Staff.

- General Manager: Bryan Cramer

=== Quileute Indian Reservation ===
The Quileute Tribe governs the Quileute Indian Reservation. The reservation is located near the southwest corner of Clallam County, Washington, at the mouth of the Quillayute River on the Pacific coast. The reservation's main population center is the community of La Push, Washington. The 2000 census reported an official resident population of 371 people on the reservation, which has a land area of 4.061 km² (1.5678 sq mi, or 1,003.4 acres).

=== Quileute Tribal School ===
The Quileute Tribal School serves K-12 tribal and non-tribal students from La Push, Forks, and the Hoh Reservation. The school has an elected five member school board and a hired superintendent. In 2020-2021 131 students from 14 different tribal heritages were enrolled. The school is currently the focus of the organization 'Move to Higher Ground', which hopes to relocate the school outside of the current tsunami zone. Ground was broken on July 1, 2020, for a new campus. Classes began in the new campus in fall of 2022.

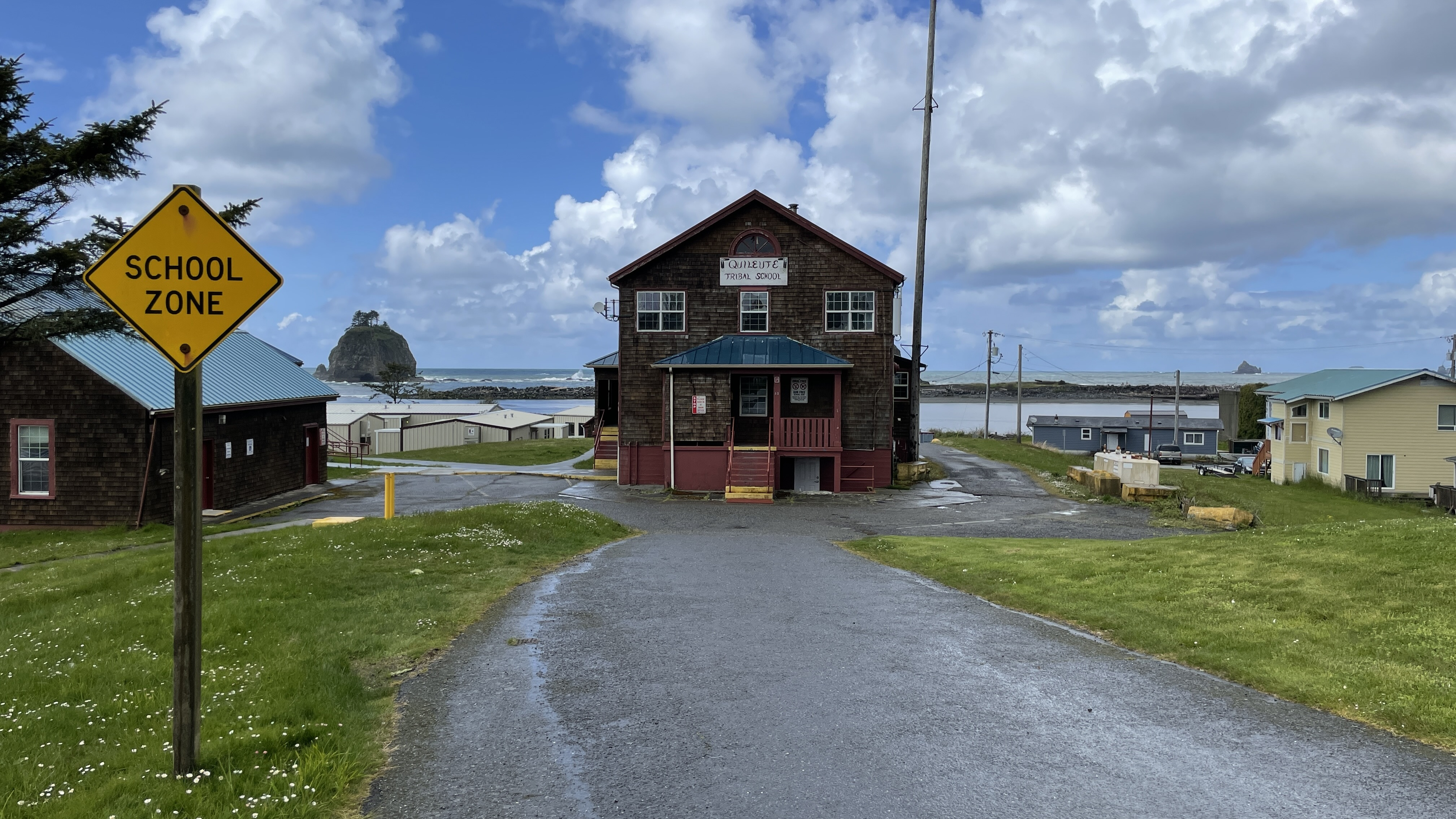
Quileute Tribal School, La Push

== Quileute in popular culture ==
Stephenie Meyer's Twilight series features Jacob Black and other werewolf characters, all fictional members of the Quileute Tribe and residents of La Push. It has been heavily criticized for its negative depiction of native people, their culture and the incorrect telling of the Quileute stories. The Quileute Tribe received no compensation from Twilight, despite their name and culture being appropriated. The Burke Museum created a website in collaboration with the Quileute Tribe, Truth versus Twilight, to combat misconceptions and educate fans about the truth of the Quileute.

Historian Daniel Immerwahr posits that the Fremen in Frank Herbert's Dune are based on Herbert's interactions with Henry Martin, or Han-daa-sho, a fisherman who lived on the Quileute reservation in La Push, Washington.
