= Quileute language =

Extinct Chimakuan language in Washington state, US

Quileute
- kʷòʔlí·yot̓ísk̓ʷa
- Native to: United States
- Region: Olympic Peninsula, Washington
- Ethnicity: 500 Quileute (2007)
- Extinct: 1999
- Language family: Chimakuan: Quileute
- Dialects: Hoh

Language codes
- ISO 639-3: qui
- Glottolog: quil1240
- ELP: Quileute

- People: kʷòʔlí·yot̓
- Language: kʷòʔlí·yot̓ísk̓ʷa
- Country: kʷòʔlí·yot̓ilo t̕siḳ̓áti

Quileute (/ˈkwɪlɪjuːt/; autonym: kʷòʔlí·yot̓ísk̓ʷa) is the language of the Quileute people, located on the western coast of the Olympic Peninsula in Washington state. The language went extinct in 1999, though today there are several second-language speakers and the Quileute Nation is working to revitalize the language in daily life. Quileute is one of two Chimakuan languages, and was the last Chimakuan language spoken natively.

Quileute is famous for its lack of nasal sounds, such as [m], [n], or nasal vowels, an areal feature of Puget Sound. Quileute is polysynthetic and words can be quite long.

The name Quileute comes from kʷòʔlí·yot̓, the name of a village at La Push.

== Use and revitalization efforts ==
There were ten elderly speakers in 1977, and "a few" in 1999. The language is listed as extinct in the 2010 version of the Atlas of the World's Languages in Danger.

The Quileute Nation is attempting to prevent the loss of the language by teaching it in the Quileute Tribal School using books written for the students by the tribal elders.

"[In 2007], the Tribal Council set up a two-year Quileute Revitalization Project with the goal of encouraging the use of Quileute words and phrases in everyday village life. A basic vocabulary of greetings, questions, numbers, names of things, and ‘one-liners’ in Quileute were made available to tribal members and staff through informal classes, email and computer CDs."

== Phonology ==
Quileute has three phonemic short vowels /ä, e, o/ (written ‹a, i, o›) and four long vowels /äː, æː, eː, oː/ (written ‹a·, a̱·, i·, o·›). The short vowels exhibit quite a bit of allophonic variation. /ä/ accepts allophones ranging between a low of [ä] to a mid [ə]; /e/ between [ɛ] and [ɪ] (rarely as high as [i]); and /o/ between [o] and [ʊ] (rarely [u]). The long vowels are somewhat more stable and are realized mostly as [äː, æː, eː, oː].

Stress is usually penultimate, but not necessarily so. It was originally described by Manuel Andrade as having had a phonemic pitch accent whereby each long vowel can host one of four pitch contours. However, later research by Jay Powell has shown that Andrade had overdistinguished and that Quileute has a simpler accentual system whereby primary stress (accompanied by a higher pitch as in English) usually falls on the penultimate syllable and some words also harbor secondary stress on a different syllable.

Quileute is notable as having no nasal consonants, a feature shared with a few unrelated languages in its immediate vicinity, namely, Makah, Ditidaht, Lushootseed, and Twana. It has the following consonants (/t͡ɬ/ and /ɡ/ are rare):

		Bilabial	Alveolar		Palato- alveolar	Velar		Uvular		Glottal
		Bilabial	plain	lateral	Palato- alveolar	plain	labialized	plain	labialized	Glottal
Plosive	voiceless	p ⟨p⟩	t ⟨t⟩			k ⟨k⟩	kʷ ⟨kʷ⟩	q ⟨ḳ⟩	qʷ ⟨ḳʷ⟩	
Plosive	ejective	pʼ ⟨p̓⟩	tʼ ⟨t̓⟩			kʼ ⟨k̓⟩	kʷʼ ⟨k̓ʷ⟩	qʼ ⟨ḳ̓⟩	qʷʼ ⟨ḳ̓ʷ⟩	ʔ ⟨ʔ⟩
Plosive	voiced	b ⟨b⟩	d ⟨d⟩			ɡ ⟨g⟩				
Affricate	plain		t͡s ⟨ts⟩	t͡ɬ ⟨tƚ⟩	t͡ʃ ⟨ch⟩					
Affricate	ejective		t͡sʼ ⟨t̓s⟩	t͡ɬʼ ⟨t̓ƚ⟩	t͡ʃʼ ⟨c̓h⟩					
Fricative			s ⟨s⟩	ɬ ⟨ƚ⟩	ʃ ⟨sh⟩	x ⟨x⟩	xʷ ⟨xʷ⟩	χ ⟨x̣⟩	χʷ ⟨x̣ʷ⟩	h ⟨h⟩
Approximant				l ⟨l⟩	j ⟨y⟩		w ⟨w⟩			

The plain voiceless stops and affricates are slightly aspirated. After an accented long vowel in the first syllable, they are preceded by anticipatory pre-aspiration. So, e.g., ‹dí·ḳa› ‘smoke’ is realized as [ˈdéˑʰqʰə], and ‹t̓ƚó·pa› ‘blue, green’ is realized as [ˈt͡ɬʼóˑʰpʰə]. Analogously, an ejective following an accented long vowel anticipates pre-glottalization, so ‹ʔá·c̓hit› ‘rich, chief’ is realized as [ˈʔä́ˑˀt͡ʃʼɪt(ʰ)] or even [ˈʔä́ˑʔᵊt͡ʃʼɪt(ʰ)]. In the same position, continuants (including /b/ and /d/ which descend from Proto-Chimakuan *m and *n) are lengthened. E.g., ‹bí·baʔa·› ‘blind’ is realized as [ˈbɪ́ˑbːäʔäː] and ‹ʔí·ƚiƚ› ‘key’ as [ˈʔɪ́ˑɬːɪɬ].

== Orthography ==
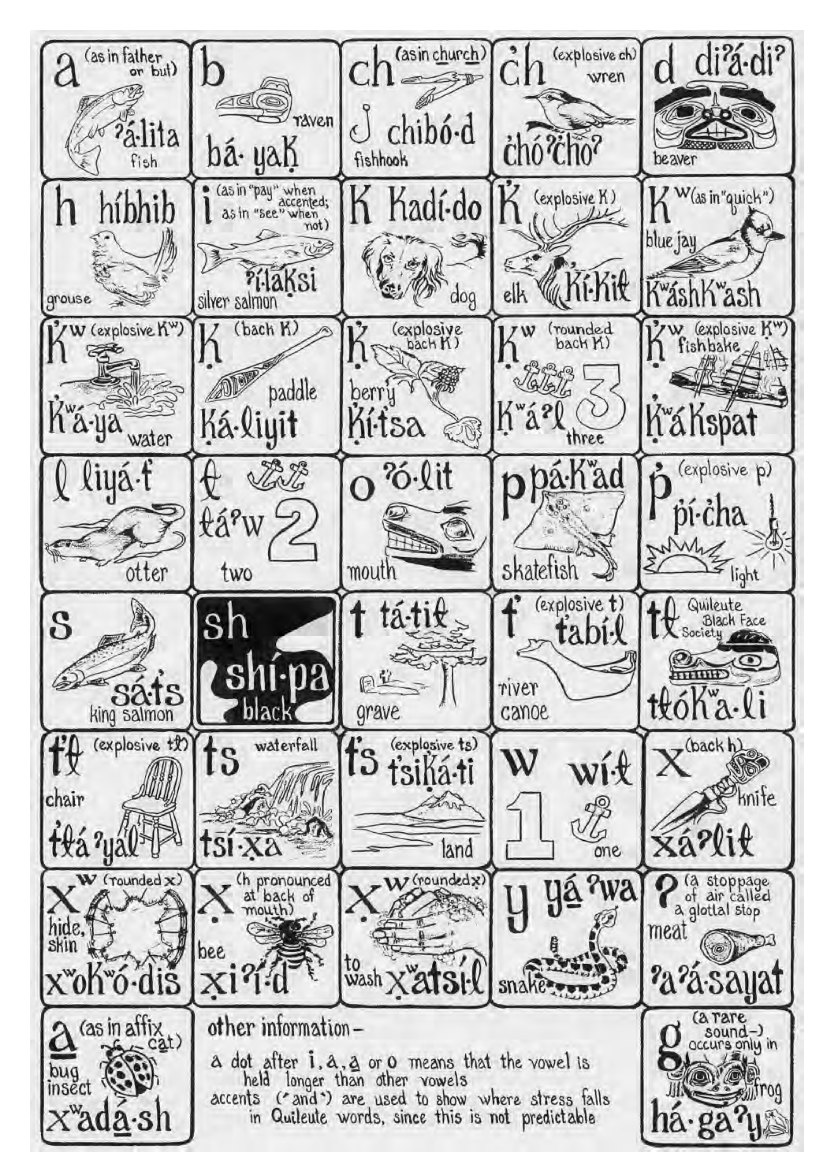
Quileute alphabet chart

Quileute uses an alphabet developed in 1969 by the Quileute Culture Committee. The accents ◌́ and ◌̀ are used to mark stress, and a dot (·) is used to mark a long vowel.

== Morphology ==
Quileute features a prefix system that changes depending on the physical characteristics of the person being spoken of, the speaker, or rarely the person being addressed. When speaking of a cross-eyed person, /t͡ɬ-/ is prefixed to each word. When speaking of a hunchback, the prefix /t͡sʼ-/ is used. Additional prefixes are also used for short men (/s-/), "funny people" (/t͡ʃk-/), and people that have difficulty walking (/t͡ʃχ-/). (Note: Mithun, Marianne (1999). The Languages of Native North America, p. 275. Cambridge University Press. (Citing Frachtenberg 1920 (her 1920b), but misattributing to "Frachtenberg 1917": Mithun's bibliography includes many of his other works, including a 1917a and 1917b, both on other topics.))

== See also ==
- Chemakum language
