= Makah (disambiguation) =

The Makah are a Native American people of the U.S. state of Washington.

Makah may also refer to:

- Makah language, the indigenous language of the Makah people
- Makah Reservation, the Indian reservation of the Makah Indian Tribe
- Makah Formation, a geologic formation that outcrops in the vicinity of the Makah Reservation
- Makah Museum, a museum operated and founded by the Makah Indian Tribe
- Makah Bay, a bay in Clallam County, Washington
- Makah Peaks, mountain summits in the state of Washington
- Makah Air Force Station, a closed United States Air Force General Surveillance Radar station near Neah Bay, Washington, United States

== Other ==
- Ashraf Makah or Sharif of Mecca, former title of the ruler of Mecca

== See also ==
- Makaa (disambiguation)
- Makka (disambiguation)
- Mecca (disambiguation)
- Ha-Makah Hashmonim V'Echad, a 1981 Israeli film about the Holocaust
