= Waatch River =

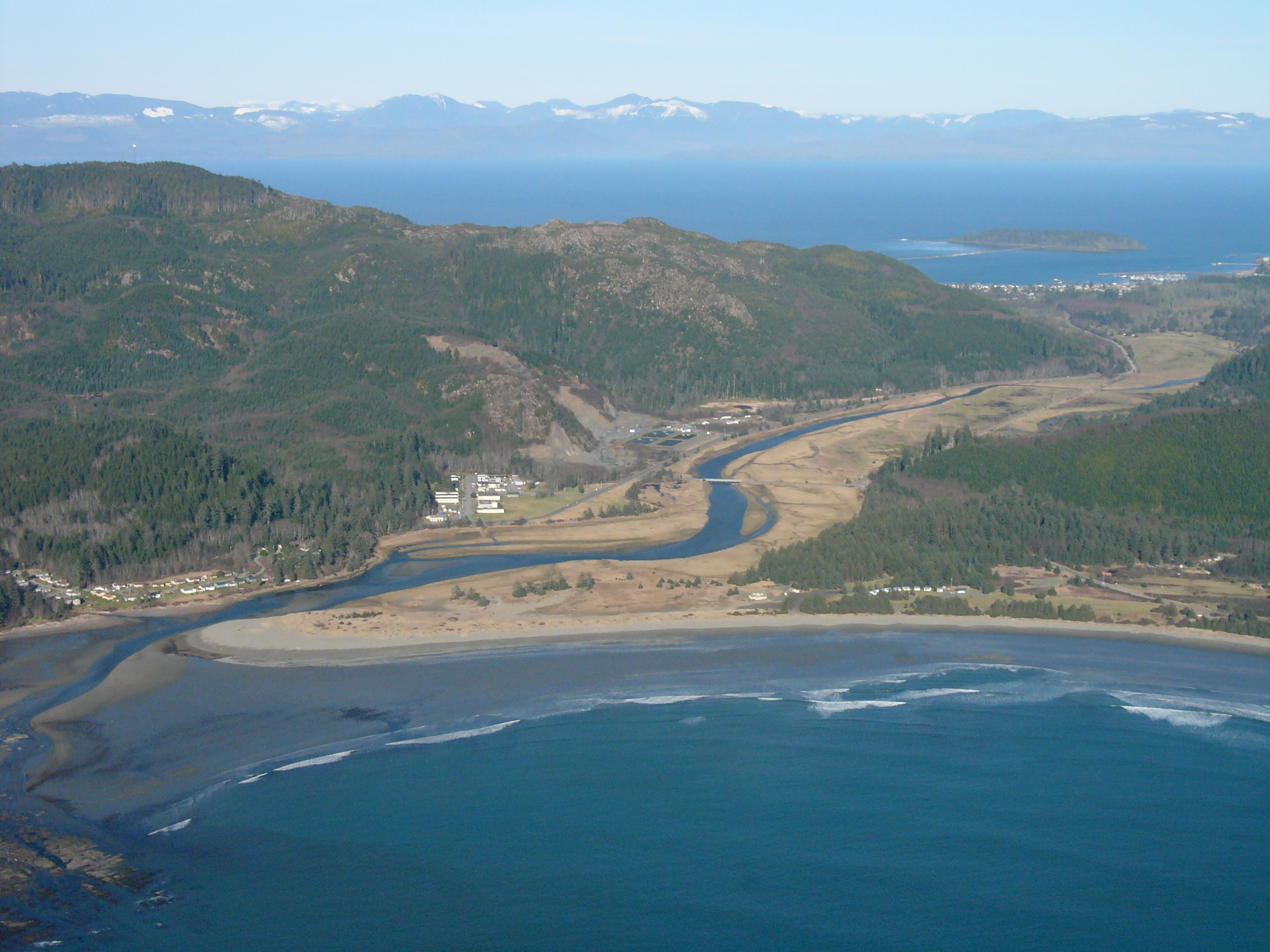
- The mouth of the Waatch River near Neah Bay
- Native name: waʔač̓ (Makah)

Location
- Country: United States
- State: Washington
- County: Clallam

Physical characteristics
- Source: Makah Peaks
  - coordinates: 48°17′12″N 124°35′25″W
- Mouth: Pacific Ocean
  - coordinates: 48°20′37″N 124°40′31″W
- Length: 7.8 miles (12.6 km)
- Basin size: 10.7 square miles (28 km^{2})

The Waatch River (Makah: waʔač̓, also spelled Wa'atch) is a small river in the Makah Reservation on the Olympic Peninsula of northwestern Washington, U.S. It flows northwest from low mountains on the southern border of the reservation towards a large valley and tidal marsh, where it turns southwest and meets the Pacific near the town of Neah Bay. It is the main source of water for the town, a traditional fishing area, and a release site for various salmonids hatched at the Makah National Fish Hatchery.

== Course ==
The main stem of the Waatch runs for 7.8 miles (12.6 km), with seven tributary streams totaling 11.2 miles (18.0 km) in length. The headwaters of the river are in the Makah Peaks, a group of low mountains near the southern border of the Makah Reservation on the northwest end of the Olympic Peninsula in western Washington. The river flows north from its source, passing a logging road, and about 2 miles (3.2 km) upstream receives two unnamed tributary streams. About 4.6 miles (7.4 km) from its source, it meets its only major tributary, the roughly 3 mi (4.8 km)-long Educket Creek. After receiving the creek, it turns southwest and reaches its wide tidal marsh. It flows through the marsh and reaches its mouth on the Pacific Ocean at Makah Bay near Waatch Point, adjacent to the mouth of Waatch Creek to the northwest.

== Description ==
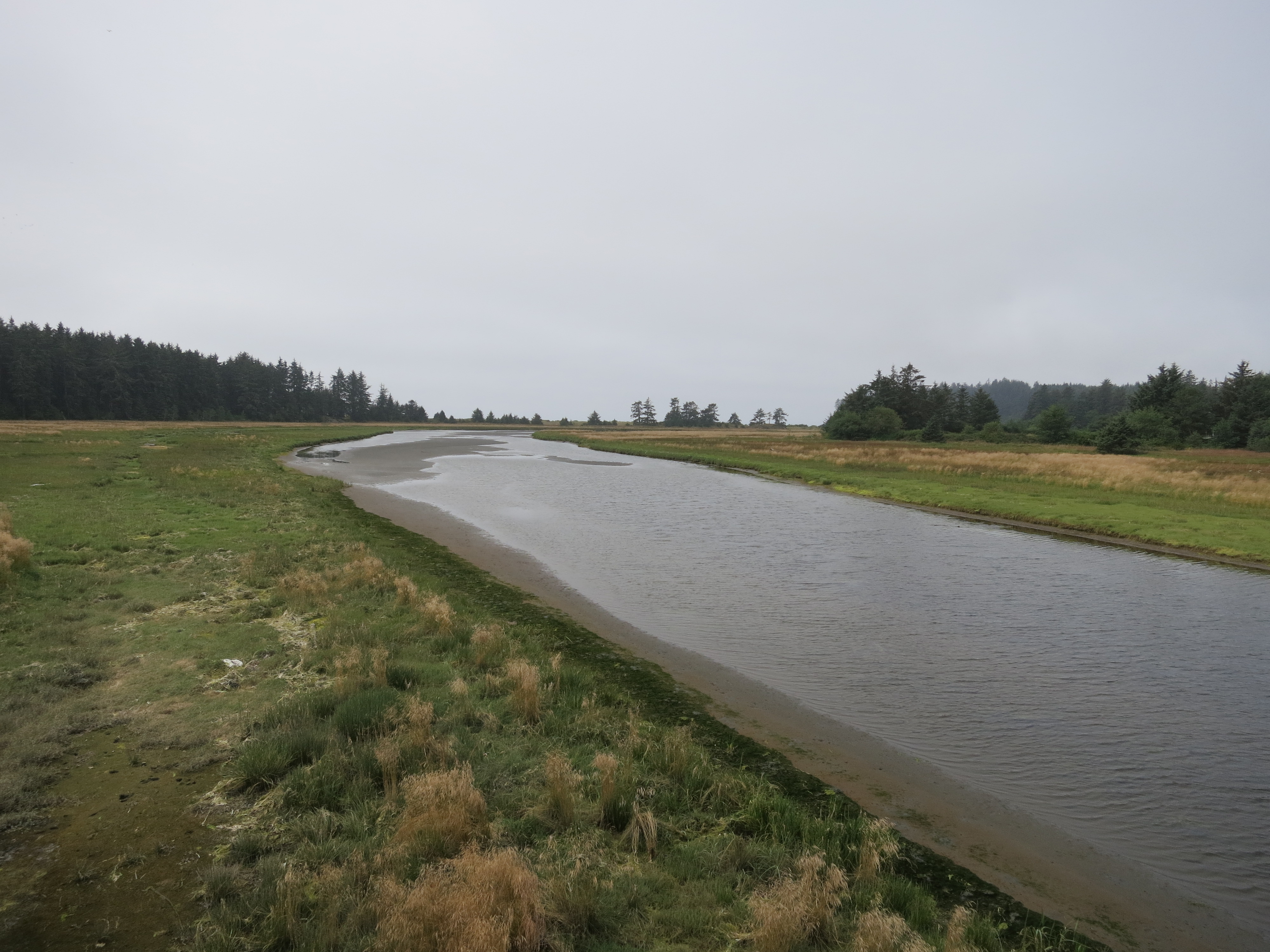
The river in its lower course near Neah Bay

The entire drainage basin of the river, about 10.7 square miles (28 km^{2}) in area, lies within the Makah Reservation. The reservation mostly consists of rugged hills with steep slopes and narrow valleys. The basin mainly consists of timberland covered in secondary forest, with only limited quantities of old-growth forest. Some of the residential areas of Neah Bay, the main settlement of the reservation, are located along portions of the river's lower course. The river is the main source of water for the town.

The Waatch River and Educket Creek have deposited a layer of clay, silt, sand, and gravel across the valley, adjacent to the Neah Bay town center. This plain of alluvium divides the Lyre Formation, an Eocene-era conglomerate and sandstone geological formation which lies beneath the river's headwaters. Some of the upper portions of the river overlie the western parts of the Hoko River Formation.

During the early 2000s, the Waatch River exceed state environmental regulations for dissolved oxygen concentration, pH, and water temperature.

== History ==
The river's name comes from the name of a historic Makah village, waʔač, possibly meaning "bundling up cedar to make a torch" in Makah. The settlement was one of the five Makah villages which existed prior to European contact. It is unknown when the Makah people came to the area; some scholars have argued that they arrived around 1000 AD, displacing the local Chimakuan, but this is disputed by other academics. The 1855 Treaty of Neah Bay protected the rights of the Makah to harvest fish in area, reaffirmed by the 1974 court case United States v. Washington, which named the Waatch it as one of the tribe's common fishing areas protected by the treaty.

During the early 1950s, the United States government constructed a cantonment (barracks) for the newly-established Makah Air Force Station adjacent to the river estuary. The station was decommissioned in 1988.

Opened in 1981, the Makah National Fish Hatchery in Neah Bay hatches Chinook salmon, Coho salmon, and steelhead trout and releases them into the Waatch and the nearby Sooes River. Chinook and Coho salmon are not thought to naturally occur in the Waatch. An impassable waterfall about 4 miles upstream from the mouth prevents fish from migrating further upriver from the sea.

== Bibliography ==
- Underground Storage Tank Site Investigation Report, Former Makah Air Force Station, Neah Bay, Washington (PDF) (Report). United States Army Corps of Engineers. 2016.
- Bright, William (2004). Native American Placenames of the United States. University of Oklahoma Press. ISBN 9780806135984.
- Dion, N. P.; Walters, K. L.; Nelson, L. M. (1980). Water Resources of the Makah Indian Reservation, Washington (Report). United States Geological Survey. doi:10.3133/wri8015.
- McMillan, Alan D. (2000). Since the Time of the Transformers: The Ancient Heritage of the Nuu-chah-nulth, Ditidaht, and Makah. UBC Press. ISBN 9780774854375.
- Olympic Peninsula Hatchery Review Team (2009). Quilcene, Quinault and Makah National Fish Hatcheries Assessments and Recommendations, Appendix A: Briefing Document; Summary of Background Information (PDF) (Report). United States Fish and Wildlife Service.
- Schasse, Henry W. (2003). Geologic Map of the Washington Portion of the Cape Flattery 1:100,000 Quadrangle (PDF) (Report). Washington State Department of Natural Resources.
- Smith, Carol J. (2000). Salmon and Steelhead Habitat Limiting Factors in the North Washington Coastal Streams of WRIA 20 (Report). Washington State Conservation Commission.
- Williams, R. Walter; Phinney, Lloyd A. (1975). A Catalog of Washington Streams and Salmon Utilization (PDF) (Report). Vol. 2. Washington Department of Fisheries.
- Wray, Jacilee (1997). Olympic National Park Ethnographic Overview and Assessment (PDF) (Report). National Park Service.
