= Makah National Fish Hatchery =

Fish hatchery in Washington, United States

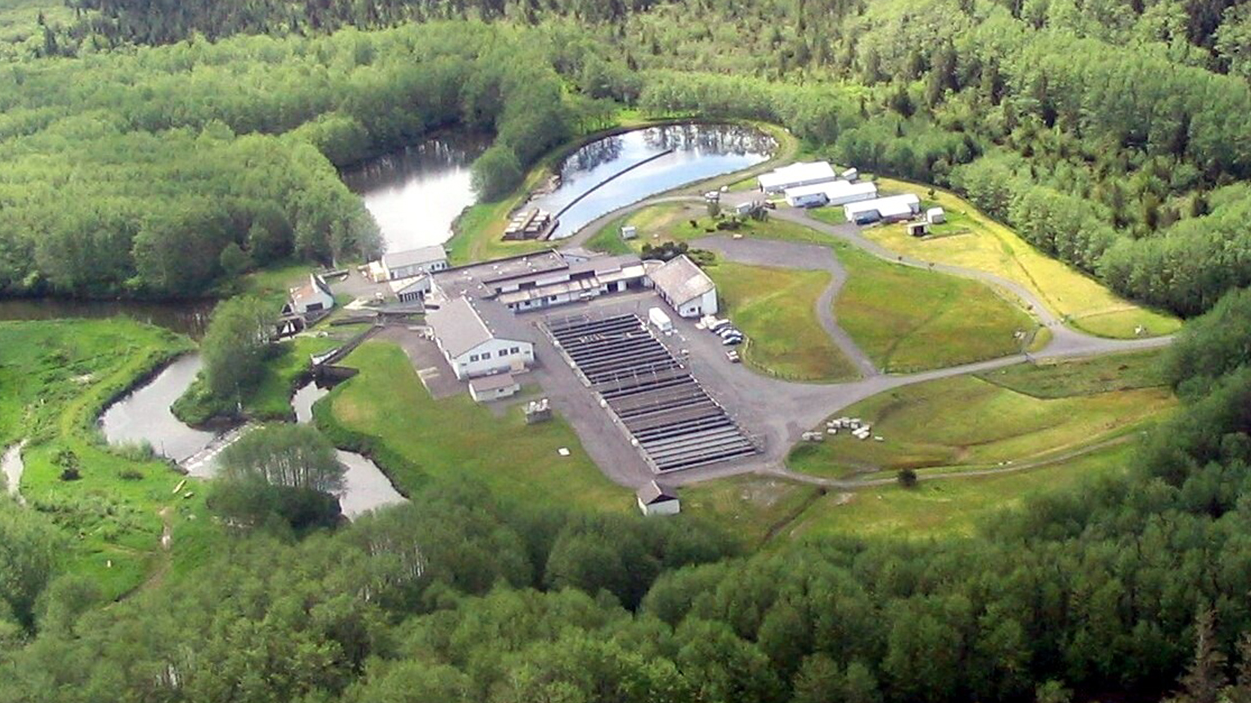
- An aerial view of the Makah National Fish Hatchery.

- Location within Washington (state) Location within the United States
- Location: Neah Bay, Washington, United States
- Coordinates: 48.29043219620914°N 124.65142404036334°W
- Established: 1981
- Governing body: United States Fish and Wildlife Service
- Website: www.fws.gov/fish-hatchery/makah

The Makah National Fish Hatchery is a fish hatchery located in Neah Bay on the Makah Reservation in Washington in the United States. It is co-managed by the United States Fish and Wildlife Service and the Native American Makah tribe. Like other components of the National Fish Hatchery System, the hatchery's mission is to conserve, protect, and enhance fish, wildlife, plants, and their habitats, as well to cooperate with like-minded partners to further these goals. Its specific purpose is to fulfill a United States Government treaty obligation to support fisheries of economic and cultural importance to Native Americans by producing fish which it stocks in Native American tribal waters in western Washington.

== History ==
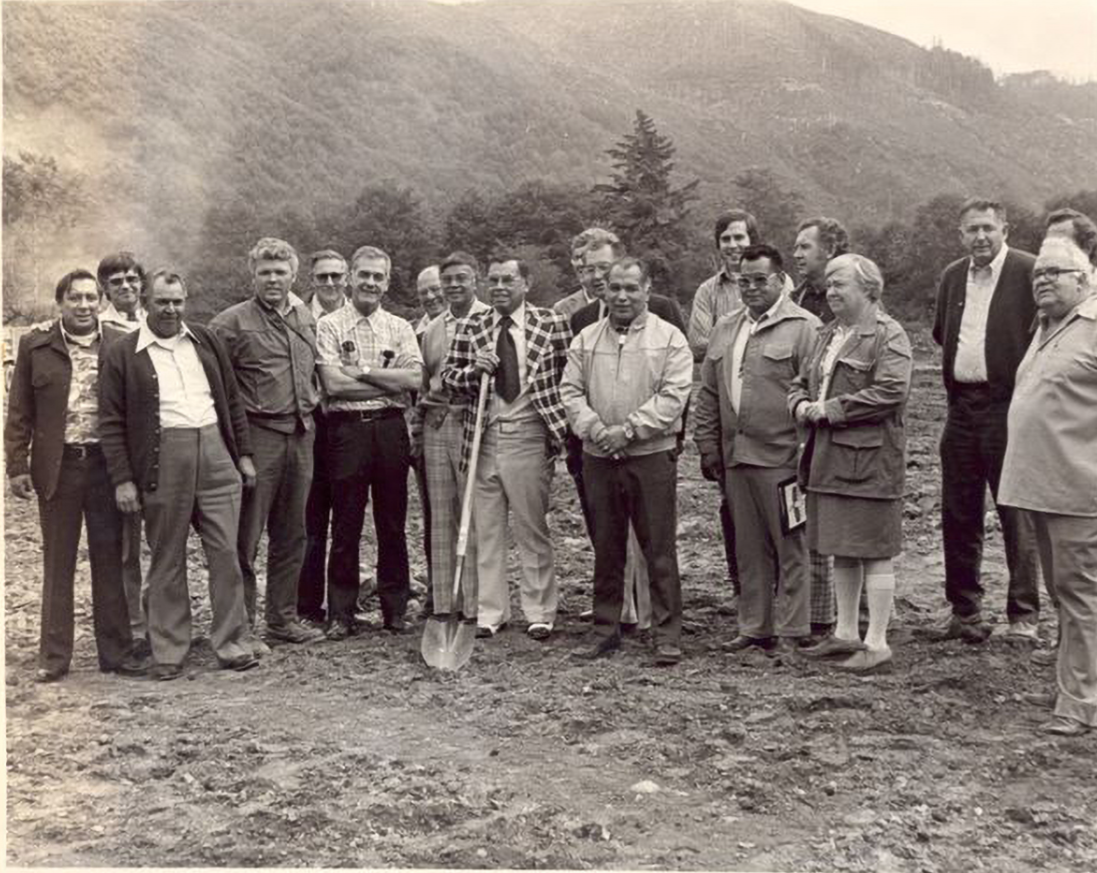
The groundbreaking ceremony for the hatchery, ca. 1976.

In the early 1970s, the Makah tribe noted a rapid decline in salmon (family Salmonidae) and steelhead (Oncorhynchus mykiss) populations in the watersheds of the Tsoo-Yess River and Waatch River and saw it as a threat to its way of life. Representatives of the tribe asked the United States Congress to fulfill the obligations of the United States under the 1855 Treaty of Neah Bay, which guaranteed the fish as a cultural resource for area tribes. In response, Congress authorized the Makah National Fish Hatchery in 1976. Construction began soon after, and the hatchery began operations in 1981. At first, the hatchery hatched and raised winter steelhead, chum salmon (Oncorhynchus keta), coho salmon (Oncorhynchus kisutch), and fall Chinook salmon (Oncorhynchus tshawytscha). The hatchery later dropped chum salmon from its program, but as of 2025 it continues to breed the other three species. By 2025, it had released about 92 million fish since it opened in 1981.

== Management ==
The USFWS and Makah tribe co-manage the Makah National Fish Hatchery. It is a component of the Puget Sound/Olympic Peninsula National Fish Hatchery Complex, which also includes the Quilcene National Fish Hatchery, the Quinault National Fish Hatchery, and the Western Washington Fish and Wildlife Conservation Office.

== Activities ==
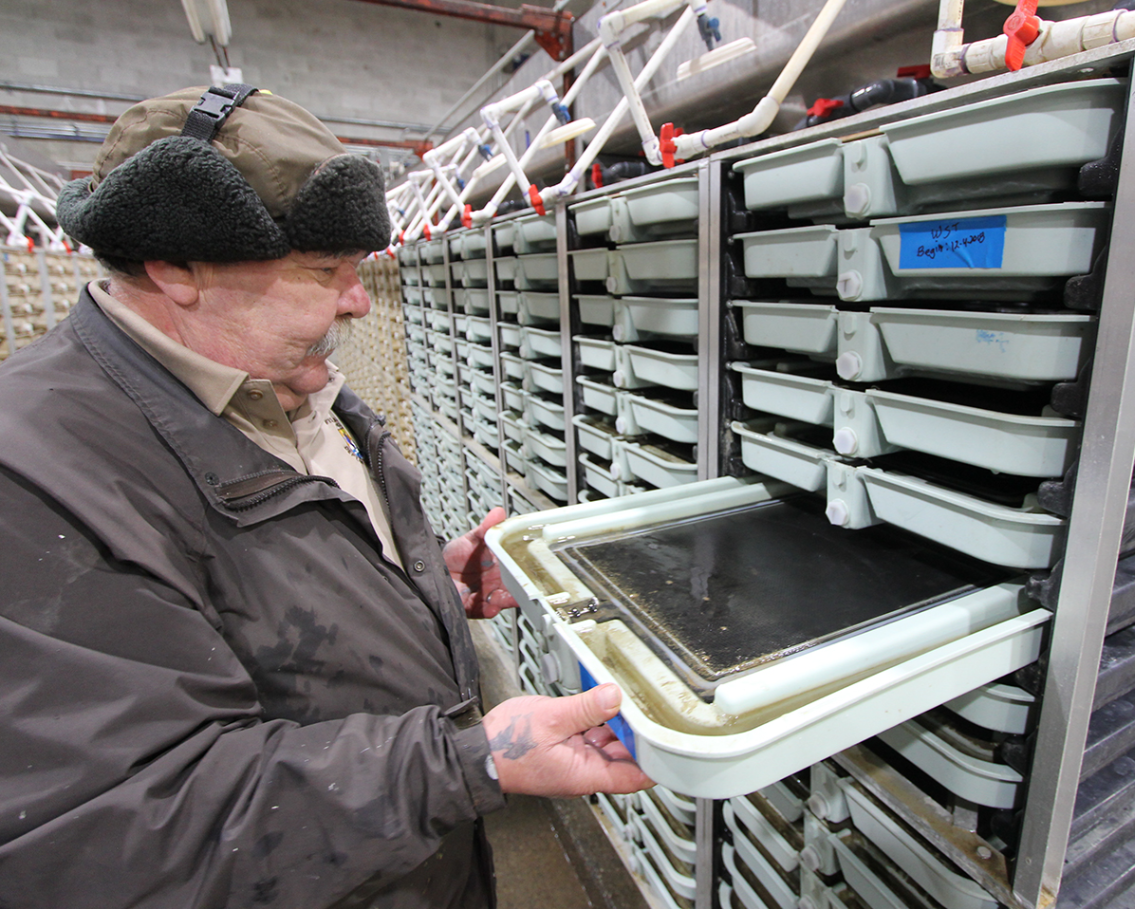
The incubation room at the hatchery

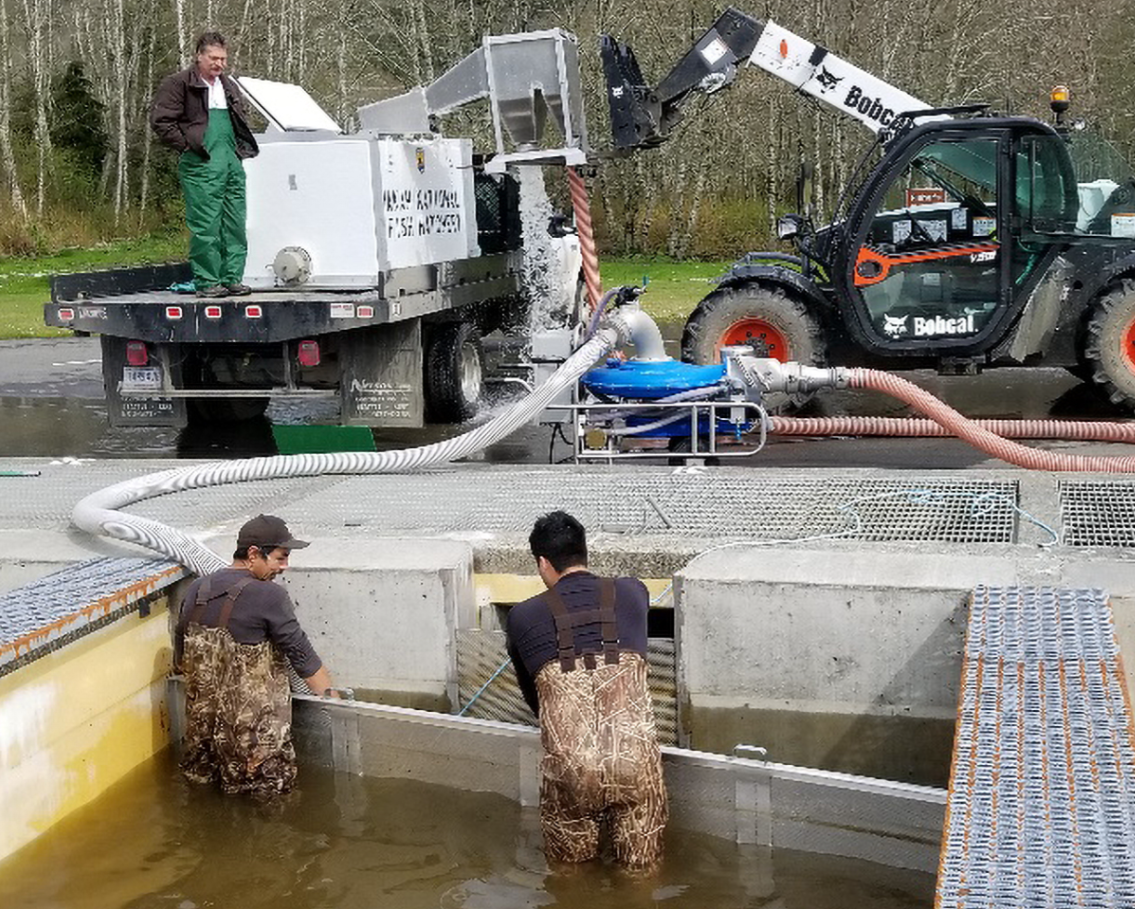
Employees release coho salmon (Oncorhynchus kisutch) fry in a raceway at the hatchery

The Makah National Fish Hatchery hatches and raises Chinook salmon (Oncorhynchus tshawytscha), coho salmon (Oncorhynchus kisutch), and steelhead (Oncorhynchus mykiss) — populations of which had been reduced by environmental changes and overfishing — to fulfill a U.S. Government treaty obligation to stock local waters to meet the economic and cultural needs of the Makah tribe, which engages in subsistence fishing. By enhancing populations of these species along the northwest coast of Washington, the hatchery also supports the commercial fishing and sport fishing industries in the area. It releases about three million fish a year into the Tsoo-Yess River on the Makah Reservation.

The total time fish spend at the hatchery varies between 7 and 16 months, depending on fish species, their biology and development, river conditions, and the hatchery management strategy. The hatchery releases fish into the Tsoo-Yess River each spring. The fish are anadromous, meaning that after hatching and growing in streams they migrate into the open ocean, where they spend their adulthood before returning to their birthplace, or natal stream, to spawn. For hatchery fish, their "natal stream" is the hatchery's tanks.

The hatchery staff holds the returning adult fish in holding tanks until the females are ready to spawn. During spawning events, hatchery employees sort the fish based on species, maturity, and sex, then remove eggs from the females, fertilize and clean the eggs, and place the eggs into incubation trays. Some embryos die before hatching, but after about 30 days, the surviving fish embryos "eye up," i.e., develop visible eyes, which allows the hatchery's staff to identify and remove dead embryos and count the surviving "eyed-up" eggs. About 10 days later, or 40 days after initial fertilization, the "eyed-up" eggs hatch into baby fish known as alevin.

The alevin remain in the incubation trays for an additional 65 days or until they have fully absorbed their yolk sacs, after which they are known as "fry". While the time from initial fertilization to the fry stage usually takes about 105 days, the time varies depending on species and water temperature. The hatchery's staff moves the fry into large tanks and feeds them several times a day, monitoring their growth throughout the year, removing uneaten food and waste from the tanks, and splitting the fry into additional tanks when crowding occurs.

The hatchery staff marks and tags most of the fish with fin clips, which allow both scientists and the public to distinguish between hatchery-raised fish and fish that hatched in the wild. The tags include a code which allows the hatchery's scientists to determine the hatchery and year of origin of each fish, providing information that helps hatchery managers make more informed decisions about hatchery operations.

At all times of the year, the hatchery's staff routinely tests water quality for temperature, oxygen, pH, and nitrates to keep the fish within their ideal ranges for these physical and chemical conditions. Veterinarians work with the hatcehry's managers to prevent outbreaks of disease among the fish — thus avoiding the use of treatments, and especially of antibiotics, to the greatest extent possible — and to treat disease outbreaks that do occur. The hatchery's staff — some of whom reside at the hatchery — also maintains the facility's water intake, pumping, distribution, and waste treatment system, and is on call to respond to emergencies imposed by adverse weather, power outages, and infrastructure failure that could kill the eggs and fish.

== Recreation ==
The Makah National Fish Hatchery lies in a temperate rainforest in a scenic area of the Olympic Peninsula about one mile (1.6 km) from the Pacific coast. It is on the Tsoo-Yess River about 2 miles (3.2 km) above the river's mouth. A popular tourist destination, it serves as an educational and experiential resource, hosting and supporting local events and providing educational programs, classroom visits, and hatchery tours for local schools.

The hatchery has a visitor center which provides visitors with a self-guided interior tour of the facility and uses a multimedia approach to explain the hatchery's operations, the fish it raises, and the cultural relevance of the fish to the Makah people. Visitors also are permitted to walk around the facility to see its fish ponds, its fish ladder, its fishing weir, and the Tsoo-Yess River. The hatchery offers guided tours to interested groups. Recreational fishing is permitted in the Tsoo-Yess River.

== See also ==
- National Fish Hatchery System
- List of National Fish Hatcheries in the United States
