= Edward Eugene Claplanhoo =

American Makah elder and chairman (1928–2010)

- Born: August 8, 1928
- Died: March 14, 2014 (aged 85)

Edward Eugene Claplanhoo (August 8, 1928 – March 14, 2010) was an American Makah elder and former chairman of the Makah Tribe, located on the northwest tip of the Olympic Peninsula in Washington state. Claplanhoo was the first Makah to earn a bachelor's degree. Claplanhoo was the chairman of the Makah during the excavation of the Ozette Indian Village Archeological Site in the 1970s. He is credited with keeping the artifacts uncovered at Ozette in Neah Bay. Under his leadership, the Makah Museum, which houses the Ozette collection, was established at Neah Bay in 1979. He also established Fort Núñez Gaona–Diah Veterans Park in Neah Bay in 2008.

== Biography ==
=== Early life and education ===
Claplanhoo was born on August 8, 1928. He was adopted by Arthur Claplanhoo (1895–1973) and Ruth Claplanhoo (1902–2002) and raised in Neah Bay, Washington, on the Makah Indian Reservation. His mother, Ruth Claplanhoo, a cedar basket weaver who died in August 2002 at the age of 100, was the last native speaker of the Makah language. His father, Art, worked as a fire lookout for the forestry division of the Bureau of Indian Affairs from 1938 to 1947.

In 1947, he enrolled as a student at Washington State College (present-day Washington State University) on a full scholarship awarded by the Washington State Department of Education. Claplanhoo was a member of the WSC ROTC when he was drafted into United States Army. He left college and took a bus to Fort Lewis, where he was sworn into the Army on November 17, 1950, at 1:30 p.m. He was assigned to the 369th Engineer Amphibious Support Regiment, Boat Battalion, eventually rising to the rank of sergeant first class. During his military service, Claplanhoo was stationed in Washington at Fort Worden in Port Townsend and at Fort Lewis; as well as Naval Base Coronado; the Presidio of San Francisco; Fort MacArthur; Thule Air Base, Greenland; and Rochefort, France.

Claplanhoo returned to Washington State College in 1953, shortly after his honorable discharge from the Army in 1952. He received a bachelor's degree in agriculture and forestry from Washington State in 1956, becoming the first Makah to graduate from college. He was hired by the Washington Department of Natural Resources shortly after graduation.

=== Makah chairman ===
In 1970, a winter storm uncovered the remains of a village on Cape Alava, now known as the Ozette Indian Village Archeological Site, which had been buried by a mudslide in the 1700s. Claplanhoo, who was chairman of the Makah at the time of storm, immediately recognized the importance of the discovery. He soon contacted Richard Daugherty, an archeologist at Washington State University. Daugherty was the WCU freshman class adviser during the 1950s when Claplanhoo had served as class treasurer.

Edward Claplanhoo and Richard Daugherty, who led the Ozette excavation, collaborated to preserve the artifacts found at the site. Claplanhoo lobbied researchers and Washington state officials in an effort to keep the artifacts on Makah land. Claplanhoo spearheaded the creation of the Makah Museum in Neah Bay, which houses the Ozette artifacts within the Makah Cultural and Research Center. The Makah museum and cultural center opened in 1979. In 2010, Ruth Kirk, wife of Richard Daugherty and author of a book on the Ozette excavation, noted the contributions that both men made to the dig and the museum: "Ed and Dick were really instrumental in getting the museum set up. Usually, back then, artifacts were taken back to the university, but here Dick always wanted them, and Ed worked with him because the Makah wanted them to stay in Neah Bay...Now it is common to do that, but back then it was a new idea."

Claplanhoo remained actively involved with his community. He served as the chairman of the United Indians of All Tribes Foundation of Seattle, a member of the Makah committee to promote higher education, and a Neah Bay Assembly of God Church elder. Edward Claplanhoo was a member of the Makah Whaling Commission, which drew worldwide attention for killing a gray whale in May 1999 after a seventy-five year abstention in whaling. (The Makah are the only tribe permitted to hunt whales in the continental United States. The right was granted to them in an 1855 treaty in exchange for much of their traditional lands.)

Claplanhoo and his wife, Thelma, (together with two other Makah families) donated land to establish Fort Núñez Gaona–Diah Veterans Park in Neah Bay in May 2008. The Claplanhoo's property had been inherited from his parents. After the death of his father, Art, in 1973, Edward Claplanhoo and his mother, Ruth, jointly inherited the property. Edward Claplanhoo approached his mother with the idea of eventually building a memorial to Neah Bay's military veterans on the land, "When my dad passed away, my mother [Ruth] and I inherited this piece of property...Before she passed away, I said to her if you give me your share, I will build a veteran's memorial to honor all the people who left Neah Bay to go to all the wars." His mother agreed to the idea.

Fort Núñez Gaona–Diah Veterans Park marks the site of a Spanish fort, called Fort Núñez Gaona (named for Admiral Manuel Núñez Gaona), constructed in 1792, which was the first European settlement in the continental United States west of the Rocky Mountains and north of San Francisco. Spanish explorer Salvador Fidalgo had arrived on the May 29, 1792, and soon established the fort near the Makah village of Deah (present-day Neah Bay, Washington). The Spaniards were expelled from the site following four months of attacks, led by Makah Chief Tetaku.

Claplanhoo had known about the history of his property long before the dedication, even taking the time to place a memorial sign at the site. However, he began planning for a full park and memorial following a conversation Lieutenant Governor Brad Owen in 2002. Claplanhoo became further interested in the park when Owens invited Edward and Thelma Claplanhoo to a 2004 opening reception for an exhibit on Spanish exploration from 1492 to 1819 at the Seattle Art Museum. Other prominent guests at the reception included King Juan Carlos I and Queen Sofía of Spain. Claplanhoo was impressed that sketches of Makah people and their canoes were displayed alongside depictions of Spanish vessels at the exhibit. Negotiations soon commenced to establish Fort Núñez Gaona–Diah Veterans Park. Claplanhoo worked closely with the Makah Tribal Council, office of the Lieutenant Governor of Washington, the government of Spain, and the Spanish Honorary Vice Consul Luis F. Esteban during the planning stages. The Embassy of Spain, Washington, D.C. also donated $40,000 to build the memorial.

Edward Claplanhoo was also inducted into the Washington State University Wall of Fame in 2008, an honor reserved for just one percent of the university's alumni.

Claplanhoo died of a heart attack on March 14, 2014, at the age of 81. He had suffered from cardiac problems, with his heart working at only partial capacity during his later life. He was survived by his wife, Thelma Claplanhoo; daughter, Karen, and son, Vern; five grandchildren and eight great-grandchildren. Nearly 1,000 people attended his memorial in Neah Bay. He was buried at Tahoma National Cemetery in Kent, Washington.

The 2010 Makah Days celebration, which is held annually in August, marked the first time that Claplanhoo did not serve as master of ceremonies since 1965.
