= Sooes River =

Sooes River c̓u·yas (Makah)
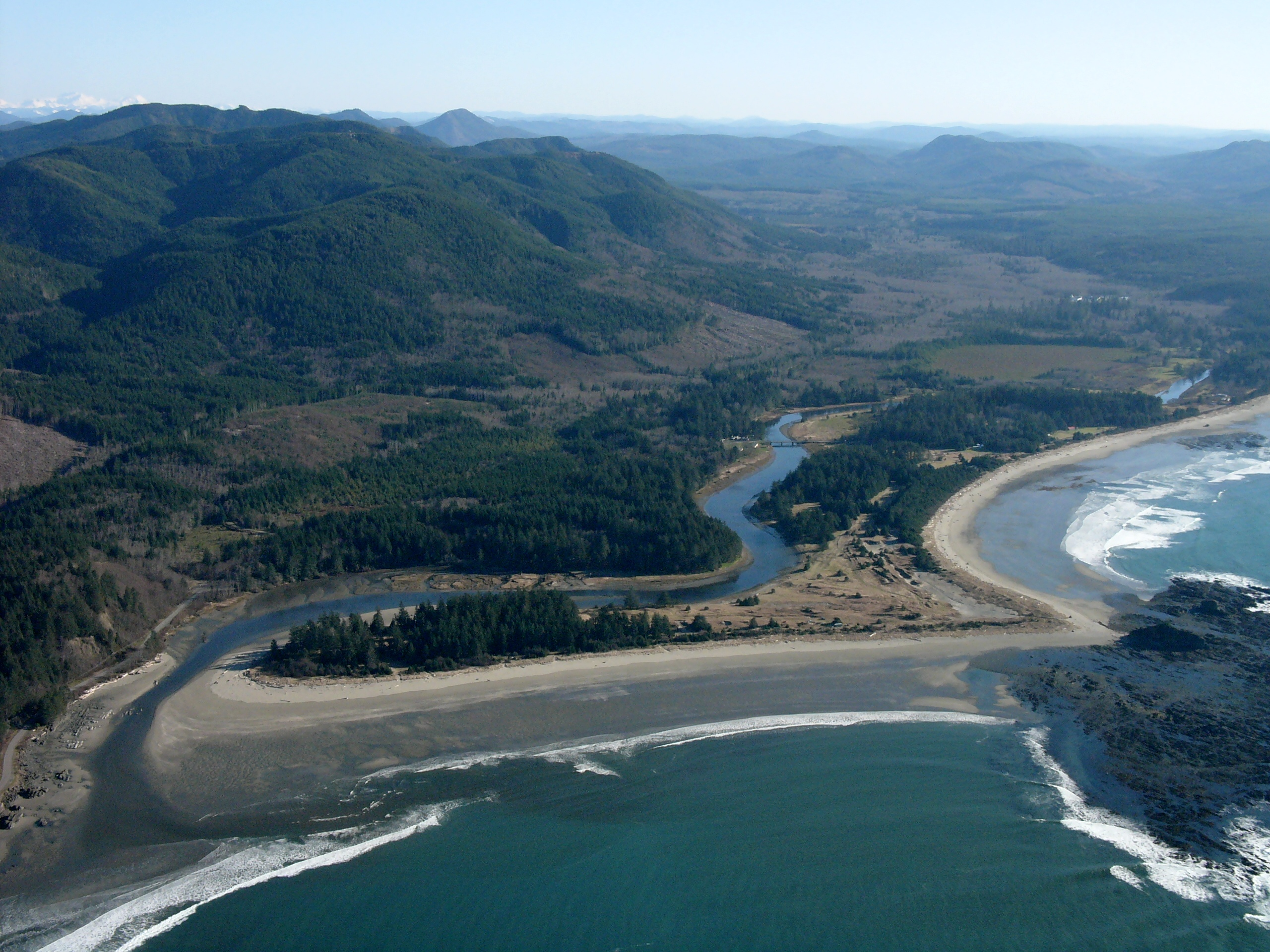
- The mouth of the Sooes on the Makah Reservation.

- Location of the mouth of the Sooes River in Washington

Location
- Country: United States
- State: Washington
- County: Clallam

Physical characteristics
- Source: Olympic Mountains
  - coordinates: 48°13′38″N 124°29′50″W
- Mouth: Pacific Ocean
  - coordinates: 48°19′27″N 124°39′27″W
  - elevation: 0ft
- Length: 14.5 m (48 ft)

The Sooes River (Makah: c̓u·yas; also rendered Tsoo-Yess or Suez) is a stream on the Olympic Peninsula in the state of Washington in the United States. It originates in the northwestern Olympic Mountains and empties into the Pacific Ocean. The Makah National Fish Hatchery is located approximately 2 miles (3.2 km) upstream and raises a variety of salmonid species.

== Course ==
The Sooes originates in the northwestern portion of Olympic Peninsula and flows generally northwest. Its tributaries include Snag Creek, Shafter Creek, Pilchuck Creek, Thirty Cent Creek, Miller Creek, Grimes Creek, Tyler Creek, and Kallapa Creek. Its lower reach flows through the Makah Reservation. It empties into the Pacific at Sooes Beach on Makah Bay, about a mile (1.6 km) south of the mouth of the Waatch River.

== See also ==
- List of rivers of Washington (state)
