= Quillehuyte County, Washington =

Washington Territory county (1868-69)

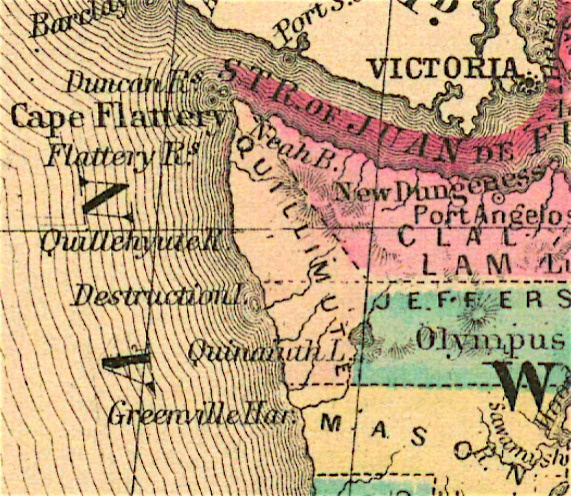
Quillehuyte County had already ceased to exist when it was shown on an 1877 map as "Quillimute."

Quillehuyte County was a Washington Territory county from January 29, 1868, to 1869. It and Ferguson County are the only two counties of the territory (now the State of Washington) that dissolved, although the Washington Territorial Legislature attempted to dissolve Skamania County in January 1865, but was overruled by the United States Congress. Additionally, some Washington counties have been renamed since their formation; Sawamish County (from a Salish people's name) was renamed to Mason in 1864 for example.

The county was probably named for the Quileute people, also taken for the Quillayute River, airport, etc. with varying spellings due to transliteration of their name from the Chimakuan language. Creation of the county from the western half of Jefferson and a portion of Clallam county (also formed from Jefferson County in 1854) may have been intended to strengthen American land claims and to encourage the Quileute people to vacate to newly established (1855) Quinault reservation.

Because it was never organized, it is impossible to say what the county seat was intended to be. The largest populated place in the former county is Forks, population c. 3,532 in 2010.

== Boundaries ==
Boundaries were set forth by the Territorial Legislature as follows: from the mouth of Wyatch River (now spelled "Waatch") on Makah Bay (48.3437°N 124.6752°W), southeast through Olympic Mountains "along the summit" to 48°N 124°W, south to Chehalis County boundary (now Grays Harbor County) (47.5178°N 124°W), west along Chehalis County boundary to Pacific coast at Queets (47.5334°N 124.3545°W), north along Pacific coast to origin.
