= Ben Johnson (Makah politician) =

Native American politician (1939–2014)

Bender "Ben" Johnson Jr. (May 22, 1939 – March 31, 2014) was an American Makah politician and fisheries expert. He served as the chairman and member of the Makah Tribal Council from 1998 until 2000 and from 2001 until 2007. He was chairman of the Makah during the first successful hunt of a Pacific gray whale in 1999. The 1999 hunt, which took a 30-ton 30 1/2-foot female gray whale, was the first harvest of a whale by the Makah since the 1920s. Johnson supported the hunt, which drew worldwide attention and controversy.

== Early life and education ==
Ben Johnson was born on May 22, 1939, in Neah Bay, Washington, to parents Bender Johnson Sr. and Harriet Eliot Stewart. At the age of five, he began fishing with his father and grandfather, which sparked his lifelong career in the fishing industry; his devotion to fishing was often described as "his life" Johnson spent most of his life in Neah Bay, with the exception of a two-year period when he left to study at Peninsula College in nearby Port Angeles, Washington.At Peninsula College, he obtained an associate degree, a fisheries technician degree and several professional certifications.

== Career ==
After leaving Peninsula College, Johnson worked as a biologist for the now defunct U.S. Bureau of Commercial Fisheries (which has since merged into the present-day National Oceanic and Atmospheric Administration). He worked on board a Bureau research vessel, the George B. Kelez, in the Bering Sea.

Johnson soon returned to Neah Bay, where he lived for the rest of his life. He devoted much of his professional life to serving the Makah and the Makah Reservation, specifically in tribal government and the fishing industry. He worked as the personnel officer, general manager, fisheries assistant director and fisheries director. He also served as the Makah director of fisheries, member of the Makah Housing Authority, and the executive director of the Makah Tribe Youth Program.

Johnson first served on the Makah Tribal Council from 1998 and 2000. He declined to seek re-election, citing the controversy surrounding the 1999 whale hunt while he was chairman. Johnson won re-election in 2001, serving as a council member and chairman until 2007.

The Makah had retained the right to practice whaling under the Treaty of Neah Bay in 1855, the only tribe in the continental United States to do so. The Makah stopped whaling in the 1920s due to the decline of the gray whale population, but decided to resume the harvest in the 1990s after the Pacific gray whale was removed from the list of endangered species in 1994. Whale meat had been a vital component of the diet of the Makah people for hundreds of years. Johnson, a proponent of the 1999 hunt, worried that the cultural significance of whaling would be lost on younger Makah members if the harvest did not resume. In a 2009 interview with the Peninsula Daily News, Johnson reflected on the long-term significance of the 1999 hunt on the Makah, "I should feel happy about that day, but I'm not because we have people that are still against us...It gets old. We don't want to stir the pot again. People don't like to hear the truth. We have to think about things like that. We [the Makah] are whalers."

== Death ==
Johnson died at the age of 74 on March 31, 2014, at Olympic Medical Center following a heart attack. He was survived by his wife, Jeanne Johnson, five children, thirty grandchildren, and fifty-one great-grandchildren.
