= Greg Colfax KlaWayHee =

American Makah artist

- Born: 1948 (age 77–78)
- Education: Western Washington University; University of Washington

Greg Colfax KlaWayHee is a Makah carver who is considered a master carver in Neah Bay.

== Early life and education ==
Originally, he studied as an educator in creative writing, with degrees from both Western Washington University and the University of Washington in Seattle. He has taught in the Native American Studies Program at The Evergreen State College in Olympia.

In 1978, he began pursuing training as a carver under the guidance of master carvers such as Art Thompson, George David, Steve Brown, and Loren White. In addition to creating new carvings he also restores historic pieces. He was ultimately able to support his family while working as a carver.

== Selected public collections ==
Greg Colfax KlaWayhee is included in the collections of the Seattle Art Museum and the American Museum of Natural History where his 2018 piece, Whaler's Wife Transforming into a Whale was part of the reopening of the Northwest Coast Hall.
