= Makah Bay =

Coordinates: 48°19′09″N 124°40′32″W

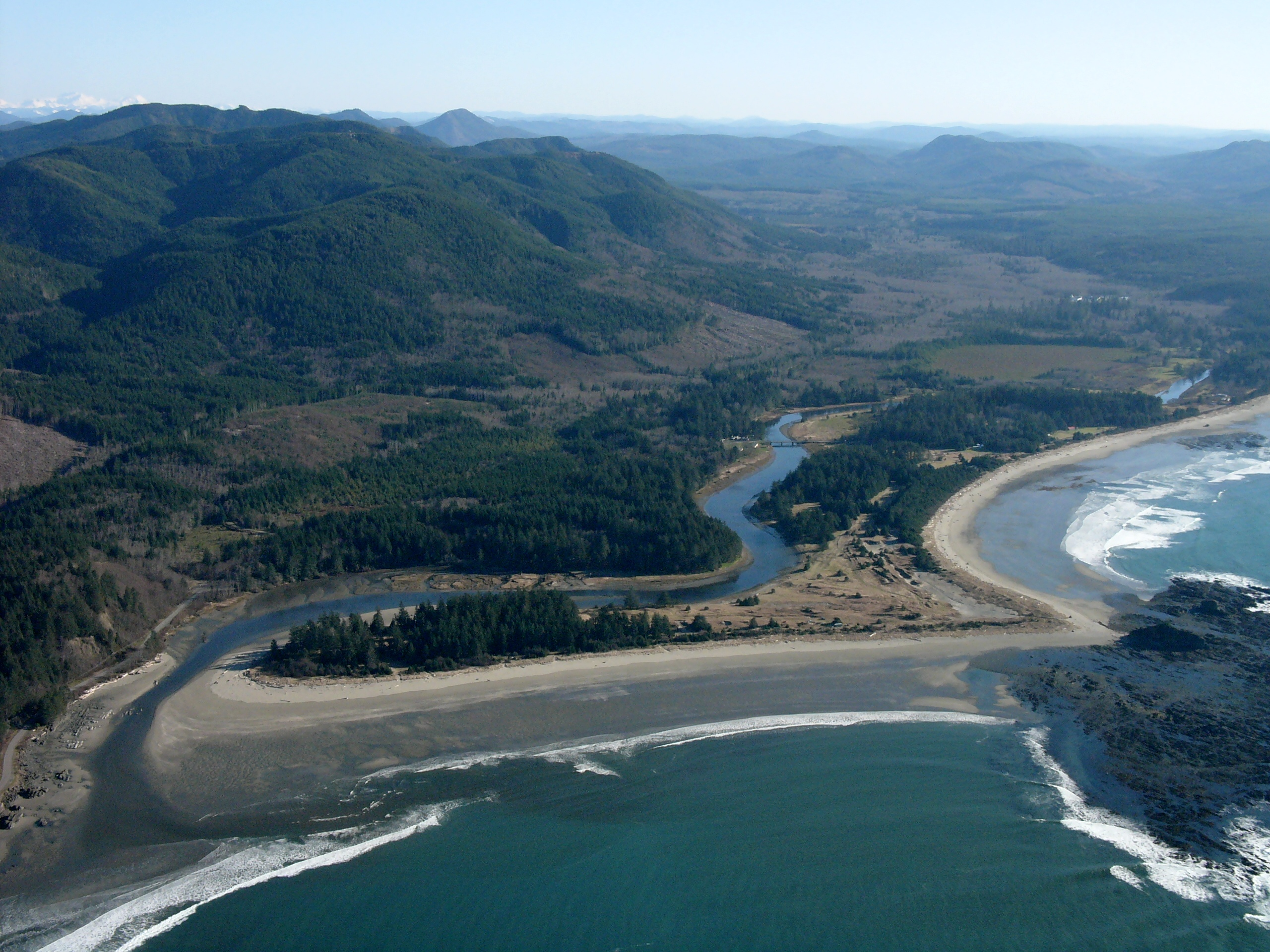
Aerial view of the Sooes River mouth at Makah Bay

Location of Makah Bay on the tip of the Olympic Peninsula. Makah Bay is in the center of the map, with Cape Flattery located to the north and the community of Neah Bay to the northeast.

Makah Bay is a bay in Clallam County, Washington, United States, located near the community of Neah Bay. Both the Waatch and Tsoo-Yess Rivers flow into this bay.

== See also ==
- Makah (disambiguation)
- Makah Reservation
- Neah Bay
- Cape Flattery
