= Bob Greene (Makah) =

Makah elder

Robert Greene Sr. (April 16, 1918 – June 21, 2010) was an American Makah elder. Greene was the oldest living Makah man and the second-to-last surviving Makah veteran of World War II at the time of his death in 2010. He was a fluent speaker of the Makah language, an indigenous language spoken by the Makah people of Washington state.

== Biography ==
Greene was born on April 16, 1918, in Neah Bay, Washington, to parents, Walter and Florence Tucker-Greene. He enrolled in Chemawa Indian Boarding School, located near Salem, Oregon, where he became a boxing champion. He was a fluent speaker of Makah, an increasingly rare language.

He enlisted in the United States Army after leaving Chemawa. Greene served in the Pacific theater during World War II. He would be honored at the Makah Days Parade for 52 years for service during the war.

== Death ==
Greene died of natural causes on June 21, 2010, at the age of 92. His wife, Hazel Butler-Greene, and two daughters predeceased him. Greene was survived by four daughters, Janice La Chester, Elaine Richardson, Pam Greene and Trudy Ward, and four sons, Bob Greene Jr., Keith Greene, Craig Greene Sr. and Kevin Greene.

Upon Greene's death, John Ides became the last surviving Makah veteran of World War II.
