= Tahoma National Cemetery =

Veterans cemetery in King County, Washington

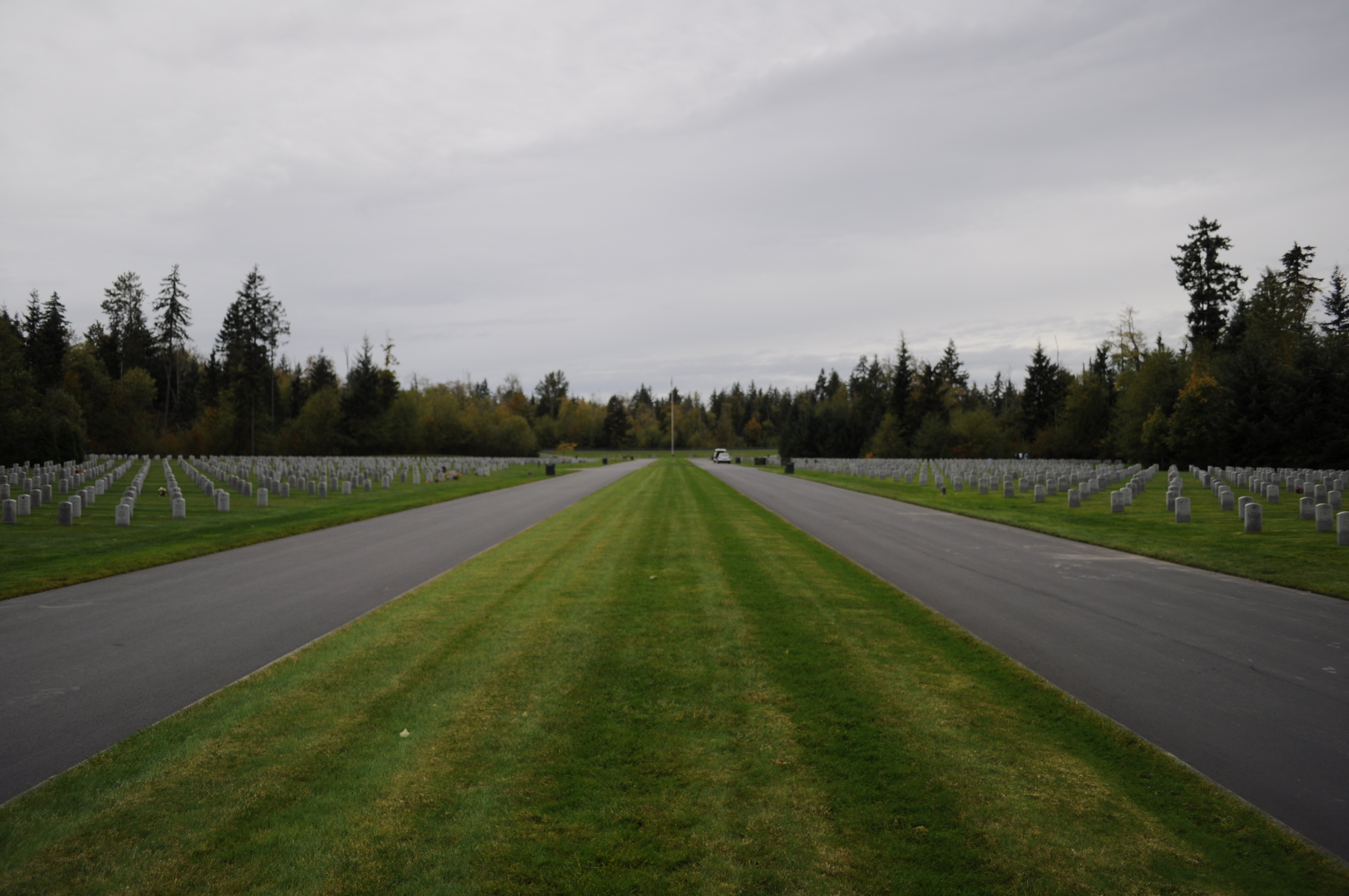
- Interactive map of Tahoma National Cemetery

Details
- Established: 1993
- Location: King County, Washington
- Country: United States
- Coordinates: 47°23′31″N 122°05′35″W
- Type: United States National Cemetery
- Size: 158.3 acres (64.1 ha)
- No. of interments: >63,000
- Website: Official
- Find a Grave: Tahoma National Cemetery

Tahoma National Cemetery is a United States National Cemetery in unincorporated King County, Washington. It encompasses 158.3 acres (64.1 ha), and as of the end of 2019, had over 60,000 interments, compared to the end of 2008 with 23,479 interments, and 15,924 interments in 2005. Administered by the United States Department of Veterans Affairs, it was the only national cemetery in the state of Washington until 2020, when the Vancouver Barracks National Cemetery was established.

== History ==
Tahoma National Cemetery was established by the Department of Veteran Affairs on November 11, 1993, purchasing 160 acres (65 ha) from the Washington State Department of Natural Resources for $1.6 million. It was intended to house 13,000 graves and reach capacity by 2040. Congress approved $10.6 million in funding to build the cemetery in 1994 and design work began the following year. The cemetery was dedicated on September 26, 1997, and opened for interments on October 1.

Until Tahoma was completed, Washington was one of eleven states without a national cemetery; the closest had been the Willamette National Cemetery in Portland, Oregon, where some Washingtonians were buried. A second Washington national cemetery was proposed in 2006 for the Spokane area.

A second phase of construction was completed in 2005.

== Noteworthy monuments ==
- The Blue Star Memorial, a traditional service flag monument dedicated to all veterans.

== Notable interments ==
- Medal of Honor recipients
  - Second Lieutenant Jesse T. Barrick, for action in the American Civil War.
  - Sergeant Dexter J. Kerstetter, for action in World War II.
  - Master Sergeant Wilburn Kirby Ross, for action in World War II.
- Others
  - Robert F. Burt, United States Navy chaplain
  - Sergeant First Class Nathan Ross Chapman, first American serviceman to die in the line of duty in the United States invasion of Afghanistan in 2002.
  - Edward Eugene Claplanhoo, former Chairman of the Makah
  - Rick May, theatre and voice actor
  - Lieutenant Colonel Edward J. Saylor, Ret. U.S. Air Force veteran of World War II who participated in the Doolittle Raid on Japan on April 18, 1942.
  - Frosty Westering, Hall of Fame college football coach
  - Frank Williams (gridiron football)
  - Harold Covington, Author and Neo-Nazi
