= Jesse T. Barrick =

American soldier who fought in the American Civil War

- Born: January 18, 1841; Ohio, U.S.
- Died: November 3, 1923 (aged 82); Pasco, Washington, U.S.
- Burial place: Tahoma National Cemetery, King County, Washington
- Military career
- Allegiance: United States of America
- Branch: United States Army
- Service years: 25 October 1861 to 15 October 1864
- Rank: Second Lieutenant
- Unit: 3rd Regiment Minnesota Volunteer Infantry - Company H
- Conflicts: near Duck River (Tennessee)
- Awards: Medal of Honor

Second Lieutenant Jesse T. Barrick (January 18, 1841 – November 3, 1923) was an American soldier who fought in the American Civil War. Barrick was awarded the country's highest award for bravery during combat, the Medal of Honor, for his action along the Duck River in Tennessee between May 26 and June 2, 1863. He was honored with the award on March 3, 1917.

== Biography ==
Barrick was born in Ohio but grew up in Minnesota. Barrick, along with his wife, Sarah Ann Strang Barrick, enlisted into the Union Army in 1861. His wife became a nurse in the Union Army. Barrick enlisted at Fort Snelling, Minnesota on 25 October 1861, joining Company H of the Minnesota 3rd Infantry and attained the rank of corporal. It was while he was in the company that he was scouting along the Duck River in Tennessee between May and June 1863. He captured two members of the Confederate army and held them captive for eight days. He was awarded the Medal of Honor on 3 March 1917 for this act.

Barrick mustered out at the conclusion of the Duck River event but later re-enlisted on December 31, 1863 where he was subsequently promoted to second lieutenant on 10 July 1864, commanding a black platoon in the 57th regiment of the U.S. Colored Infantry. He was discharged a few months later, on 15 October 1864 due to a disability.

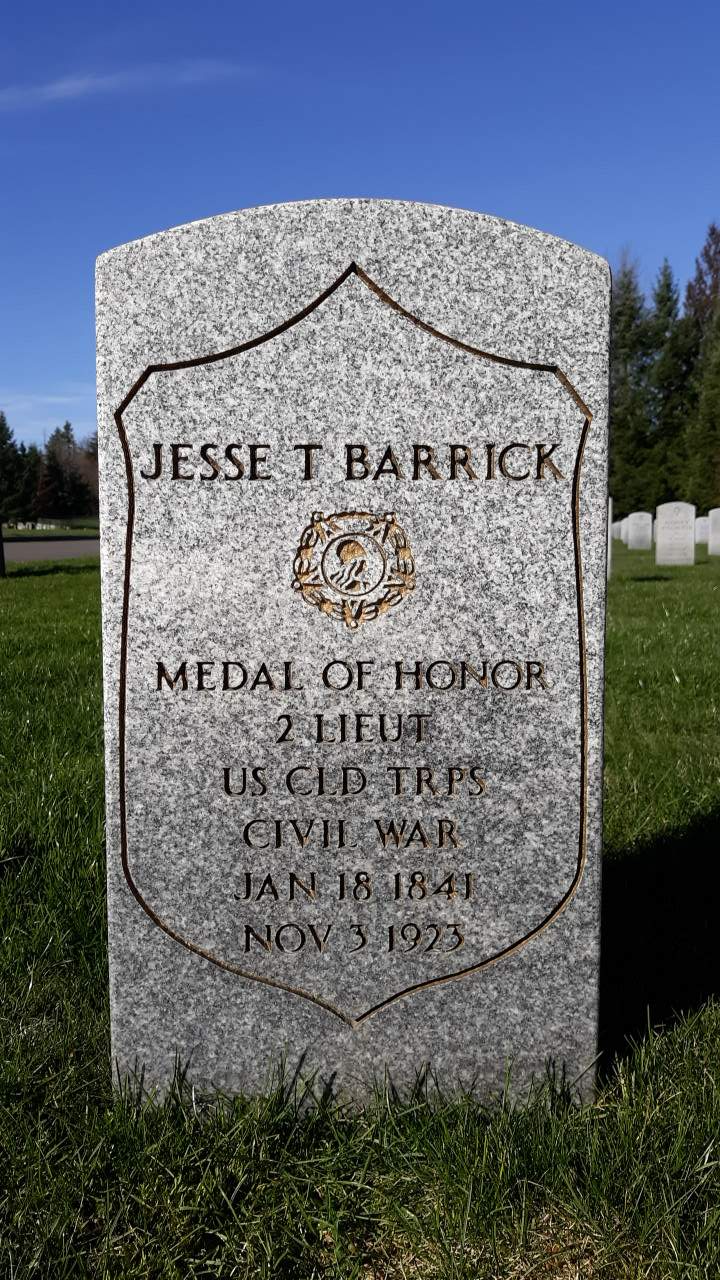
Gravestone at Tahoma National Cemetery

After the war, he was involved in the fur trade in Suquamish, Kitsap County, Washington, where he had relocated in 1909. He again moved to Pasco in 1912 where he later died on 3 November 1923. He was initially buried in an unmarked grave in the Pasco City Cemetery in Pasco. His remains were later exhumed in February 2000 and interred at Section 8, Grave 108 at the Tahoma National Cemetery. The cemetery's traffic circle is named after Barrick.

== Medal of Honor citation ==
While on a scout captured single-handed 2 desperate Confederate guerrilla officers who were together and well armed at the time.

== See also ==
- List of American Civil War Medal of Honor recipients: A–F
