= Frank Williams (gridiron football) =

American gridiron football player (1932–2006)

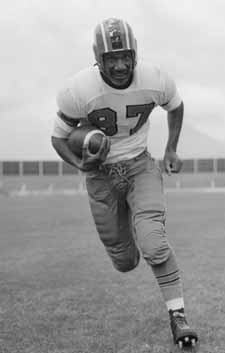
- Williams in 1955

Profile
- Positions: Halfback, Fullback

Personal information
- Born: May 29, 1932; Bowie County, Texas, U.S.
- Died: July 13, 2006 (aged 74)
- Listed height: 6 ft 2 in (1.88 m)
- Listed weight: 215 lb (98 kg)

Career information
- College: Pepperdine

Career history
- 1955: BC Lions
- 1961: Los Angeles Rams
- Stats at Pro Football Reference

Frank Williams Jr. (May 29, 1932 – July 13, 2006) was a gridiron football player who played for the BC Lions and Los Angeles Rams. His parents were Frank Williams and Elya M. Glenn of Texarkana, Texas. He was one of four children. The nurses wrote his name incorrectly on the certificate, which read, Frank 'Jr.' Williams. He actually didn't have a middle name, he was a junior, named after his father, Frank Williams. He went by Frank James Williams or Frank J. Williams. He played college football at Pepperdine University.

Williams served as a sergeant in the United States Army during the Korean War. He had six children; which included Shelia Williams, Casandra Williams, and Michelle Williams. He died on July 13, 2006, and is buried in Kent, King County, Washington at Tahoma National Cemetery.
