= Makaa =

Makaa may refer to:

- Makaa language of Cameroon
- Maka people, the people who speak that language
- Makaa Maka, an album by Ghanaian rapper Reggie Rockstone

== See also ==
- Makah (disambiguation)
- Maka (disambiguation)
