= Waadah Island =

Island in Clallam County, Washington, United States

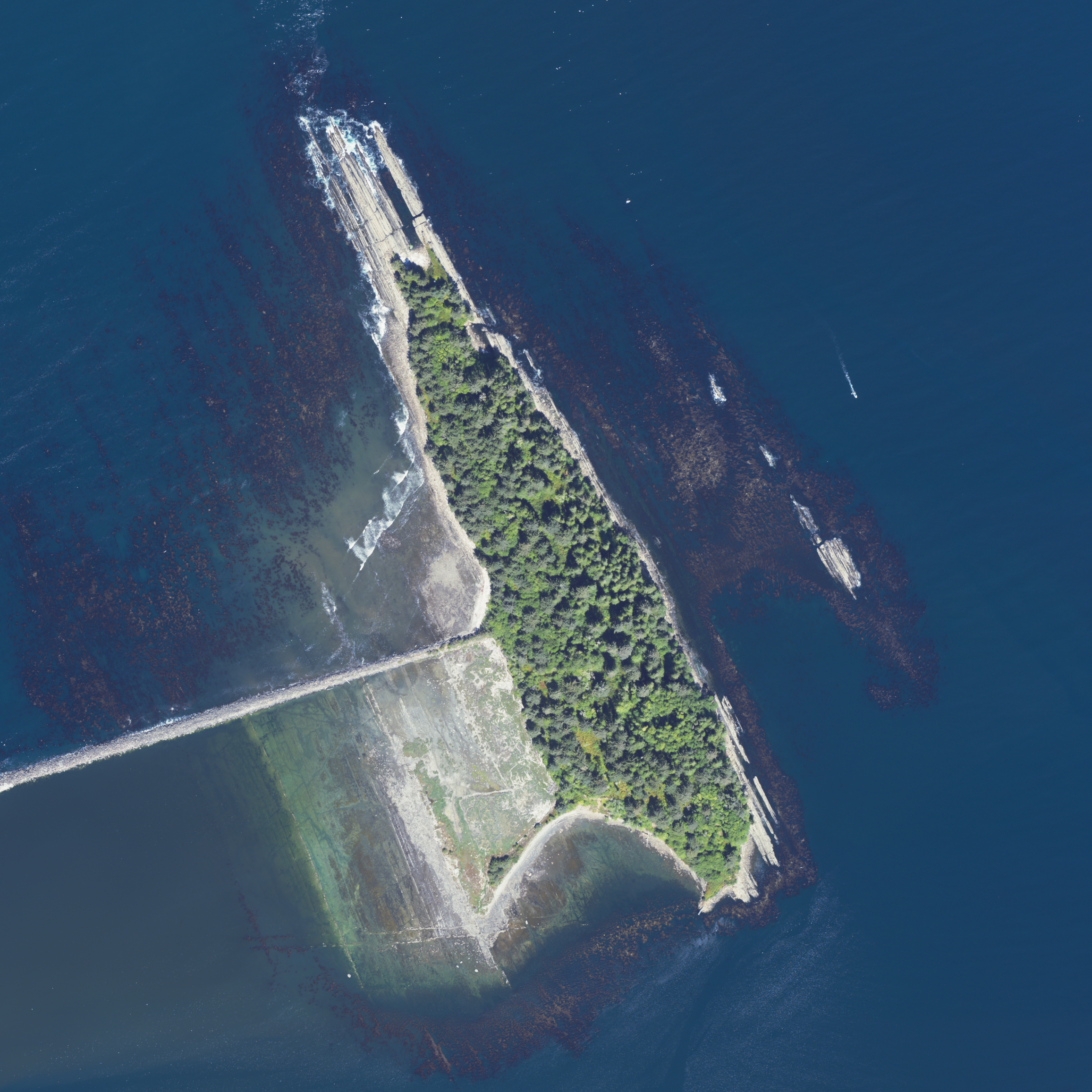
- Waadah Island in August 2023

Geography
- Location: Neah Bay
- Coordinates: 48°22′55.25″N 124°35′50.85″W
- Highest elevation: 18 m (59 ft)

Administration
- United States
- State: Washington
- County: Clallam County

Additional information
- Time zone: PST (UTC-8)
  - Summer (DST): PDT (UTC-7)

Waadah Island is an island situated in the Strait of Juan de Fuca, just north of Neah Bay in northwestern Clallam County, Washington, United States. The island has a land area of 164,940 square meters (40.76 acres) and has no human population.
