= Makah Museum =

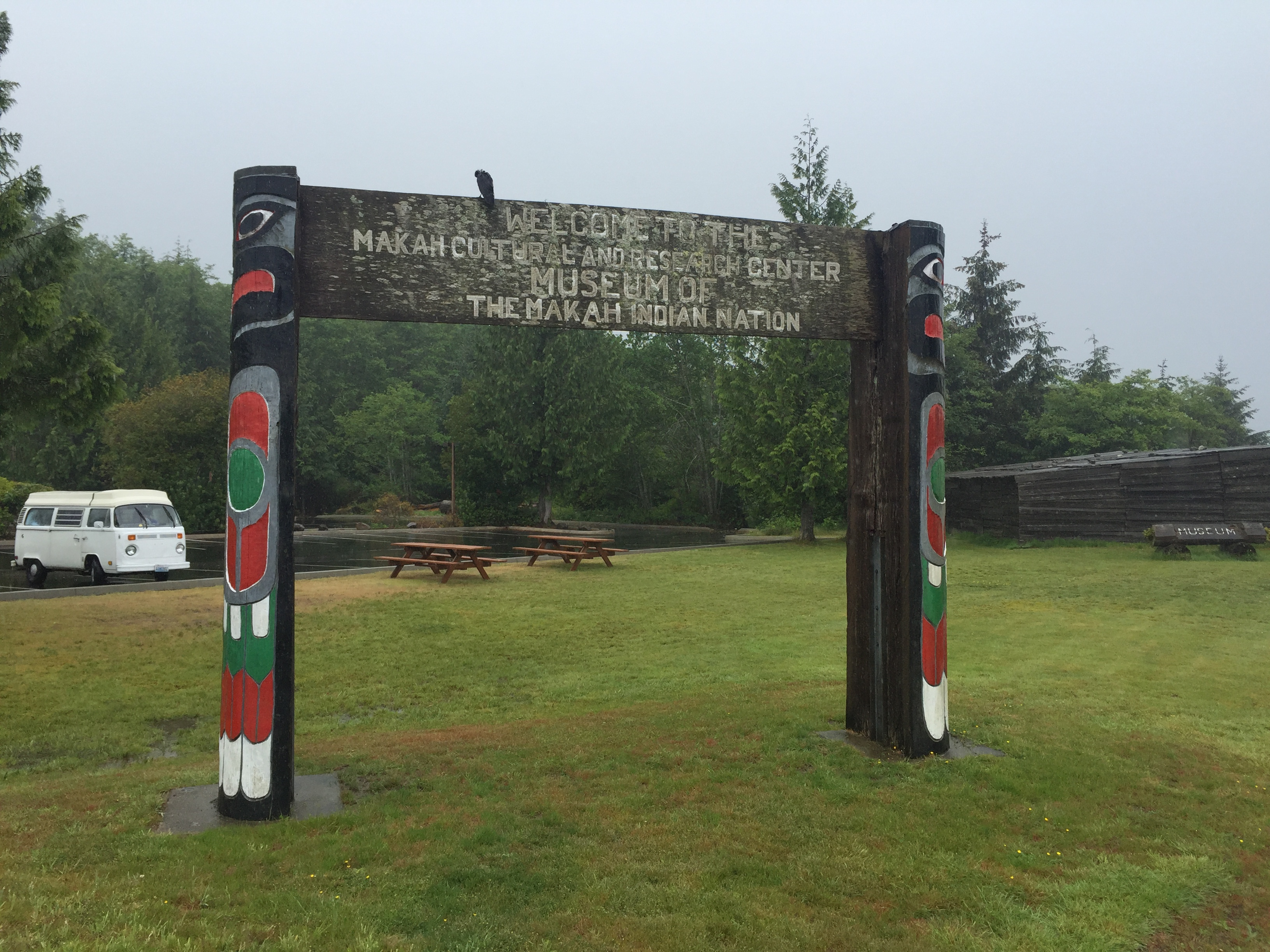
- Established: 1979
- Location: Neah Bay, Washington, U.S.
- Coordinates: 48°22′5.88″N 124°35′56.4″W
- Type: Archaeological and anthropological museum
- Collection size: Artifacts from Ozette dig
- Owner: Makah Tribe
- Website: makahmuseum.com

The Makah Museum, also known as the Makah Cultural and Research Center, is an archaeological and anthropological museum on the Makah Indian reservation in Neah Bay, Washington. It houses and interprets artifacts from the Ozette Indian Village Archeological Site, a Makah village partly buried by a mudslide at Lake Ozette around 1750, providing a snapshot of pre-contact tribal life. The museum includes a replica long house and thousands of artifacts of interest to academics and laypeople, including canoes, basketry, whaling and fishing gear.

The museum was created under the leadership of tribal chairman Edward Eugene Claplanhoo and opened in 1979, soon after the Lake Ozette site was unearthed.
