= Makah Peaks =

Mountains in Washington (state), United States

Coordinates: 48°17′38″N 124°36′57″W

The Makah Peaks, 511 m (1676 feet), are mountain summits near Neah Bay on the Olympic Peninsula in the US state of Washington. They are located in Clallam County.
