= Neah Bay, Washington =

Neah Bay, Washington di·ya (Makah)
- CDP
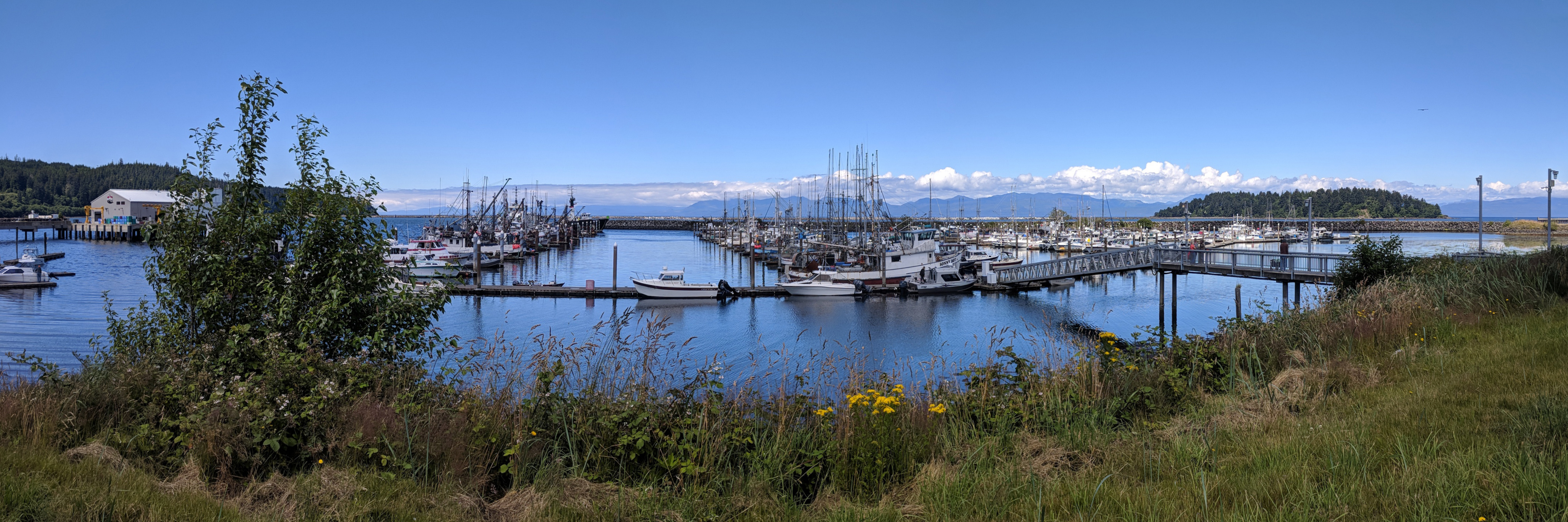
- View of the Marina

- Location in Clallam County and the state of Washington

- Location in the United States
- Coordinates: 48°21′56″N 124°37′20″W
- Country: United States
- State: Washington
- County: Clallam

Area
  - Total: 2.4 sq mi (6.1 km^{2})
  - Land: 2.4 sq mi (6.1 km^{2})
  - Water: 0 sq mi (0.0 km^{2})
- Elevation: 210 ft (64 m)

Population (2020)
  - Total: 935
  - Density: 336/sq mi (129.7/km^{2})
- Time zone: UTC-08:00 (PST)
  - Summer (DST): UTC-07:00 (PDT)
- ZIP Code: 98357
- Area code: 360, 564
- FIPS code: 53-48295
- GNIS feature ID: 2408908

Neah Bay (Makah: di·ya) is a census-designated place (CDP) on the Makah Reservation in Clallam County, Washington, United States. The population was 935 at the 2020 census. It is across the Canada–US border from British Columbia. Europeans originally called it "Scarborough Harbour" in honor of Captain James Scarborough of the Hudson's Bay Company. It was changed to Neah in 1847 by Captain Henry Kellett. Kellett spelled it "Neeah Bay". The name "Neah" refers to the Makah Chief Dee-ah, pronounced Neah in the Klallam language. During the summer months, Neah Bay is a popular fishing area for sports fishermen. Another attraction is the Makah Museum, which houses artifacts from a Makah village partly buried by a mudslide around 1750. Many people also visit to hike the Cape Trail or camp at Hobuck Beach. An emergency response tug is stationed at Neah Bay which has saved 41 vessels since its introduction in 1999.

== Geography ==
According to the United States Census Bureau, Neah Bay has a total area of 2.4 sq mi (6.2 km^{2}), all of it land. The community is approximately 118 mi (190 km) west-northwest of Seattle.

=== Climate ===
Neah Bay has an oceanic climate (Köppen: Cfb), common in the small coastal cities of Washington. Generally speaking, temperatures have little annual fluctuation being strongly influenced by the Pacific Ocean, with the warm currents and patterns of the west as well as the mountains to the east that shape an extremely light climate, even between places in close conditions. Its climate is similar to southern New Zealand, but with cool summers to cold and rarely warm as it is most common in these places. To the west of the Olympic Mountains, Neah Bay has an often rainy climate and usually in larger numbers than the Gulf Coast, the wettest place in the eastern US. Although it is a pretty damp city, its average amount of snow falling is only slightly higher than Norfolk, VA. Sunshine hours are typical for an often hazy temperate climate. Climate data is taken from a weather station on nearby Tatoosh Island that operated until 1966.

Climate data for Tatoosh, Washington
Month	Jan	Feb	Mar	Apr	May	Jun	Jul	Aug	Sep	Oct	Nov	Dec	Year
Record high °F (°C)	64 (18)	64 (18)	67 (19)	75 (24)	81 (27)	82 (28)	80 (27)	78 (26)	80 (27)	77 (25)	68 (20)	61 (16)	82 (28)
Mean daily maximum °F (°C)	45.3 (7.4)	46.8 (8.2)	48.0 (8.9)	51.5 (10.8)	55.0 (12.8)	57.7 (14.3)	59.5 (15.3)	59.8 (15.4)	59.1 (15.1)	55.8 (13.2)	50.7 (10.4)	47.5 (8.6)	53.1 (11.7)
Daily mean °F (°C)	42.0 (5.6)	43.2 (6.2)	44.1 (6.7)	47.3 (8.5)	50.8 (10.4)	53.7 (12.1)	55.5 (13.1)	55.8 (13.2)	54.7 (12.6)	51.9 (11.1)	47.2 (8.4)	44.2 (6.8)	49.2 (9.6)
Mean daily minimum °F (°C)	38.7 (3.7)	39.6 (4.2)	40.2 (4.6)	43.2 (6.2)	46.7 (8.2)	49.8 (9.9)	51.5 (10.8)	51.8 (11.0)	50.3 (10.2)	48.0 (8.9)	43.6 (6.4)	40.9 (4.9)	45.4 (7.4)
Record low °F (°C)	14 (−10)	20 (−7)	25 (−4)	33 (1)	37 (3)	43 (6)	45 (7)	45 (7)	43 (6)	33 (1)	19 (−7)	14 (−10)	14 (−10)
Average precipitation inches (mm)	15.01 (381)	12.11 (308)	10.21 (259)	6.86 (174)	4.03 (102)	3.02 (77)	2.36 (60)	2.29 (58)	4.27 (108)	10.30 (262)	14.10 (358)	16.02 (407)	100.58 (2,554)
Average snowfall inches (cm)	3.5 (8.9)	1.6 (4.1)	1.7 (4.3)	0 (0)	0 (0)	0 (0)	0 (0)	0 (0)	0 (0)	0 (0)	0.4 (1.0)	1.6 (4.1)	8.8 (22)
Average precipitation days (≥ 0.01 in)	22	19	20	17	13	13	11	12	11	17	21	24	199
Source: WRCC (normals 1931-1966)

== Panorama ==
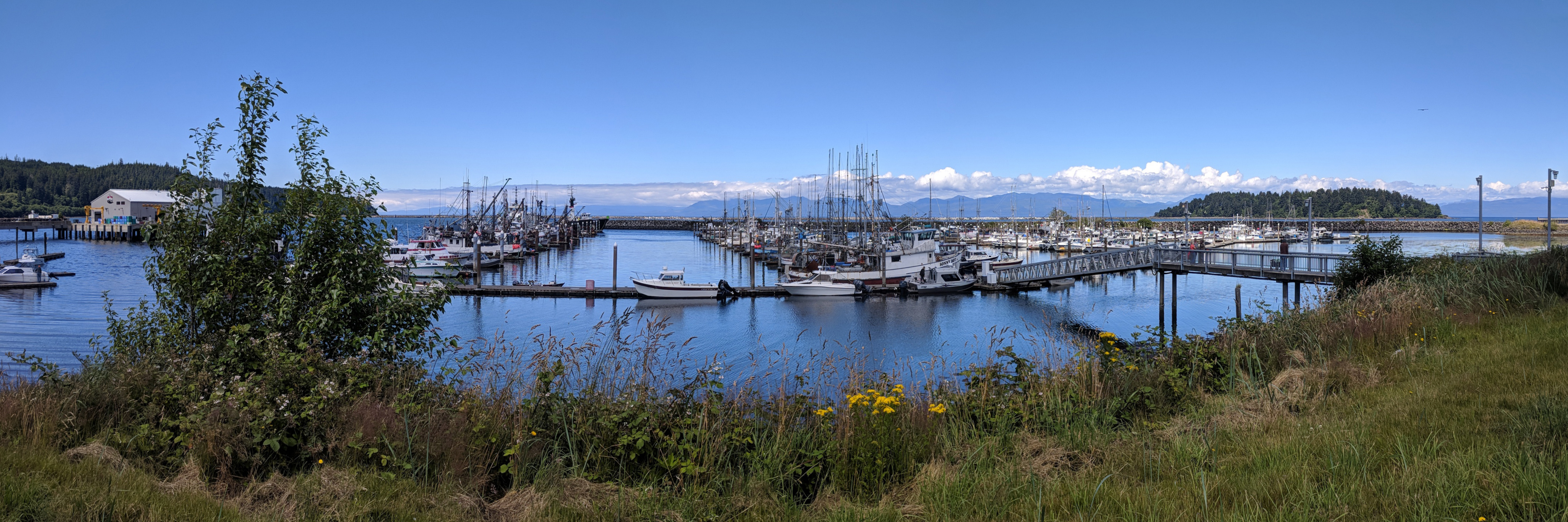
Panoramic view of the Makah Marina at Neah Bay

== Demographics ==
Historical population
Census	Pop.	Note	%±
2010	865		—
2020	935		8.1%
U.S. Decennial Census

As of the census of 2010, there were 865 people, 282 households, and 181 families residing in the CDP. The population density was 335.8 people per square mile (129.9/km^{2}). There were 322 housing units at an average density of 136.2/sq mi (52.7/km^{2}). The racial makeup of the CDP was 12.1% White, 0.2% African American, 77.1% Native American, .7% from other races, and 9.7% from two or more races. Hispanic or Latino of any race were 5.42% of the population.

There were 282 households, out of which 37.6% had children under the age of 18 living with them, 36.2% were married couples living together, 17.7% had a female householder with no husband present, and 35.8% were non-families. 31.2% of all households were made up of individuals, and 5.3% had someone living alone who was 65 years of age or older. The average household size was 2.76 and the average family size was 3.38.

In the CDP, the age distribution of the population shows 34.0% under the age of 18, 12.5% from 18 to 24, 26.7% from 25 to 44, 21.0% from 45 to 64, and 5.8% who were 65 years of age or older. The median age was 29 years. For every 100 females, there were 123.7 males. For every 100 females age 18 and over, there were 128.8 males.

The median income for a household in the CDP was $21,635, and the median income for a family was $24,583. Males had a median income of $28,750 versus $27,917 for females. The per capita income for the CDP was $11,338. About 26.3% of families and 29.9% of the population were below the poverty line, including 32.6% of those under age 18 and 32.6% of those age 65 or over.

== History ==
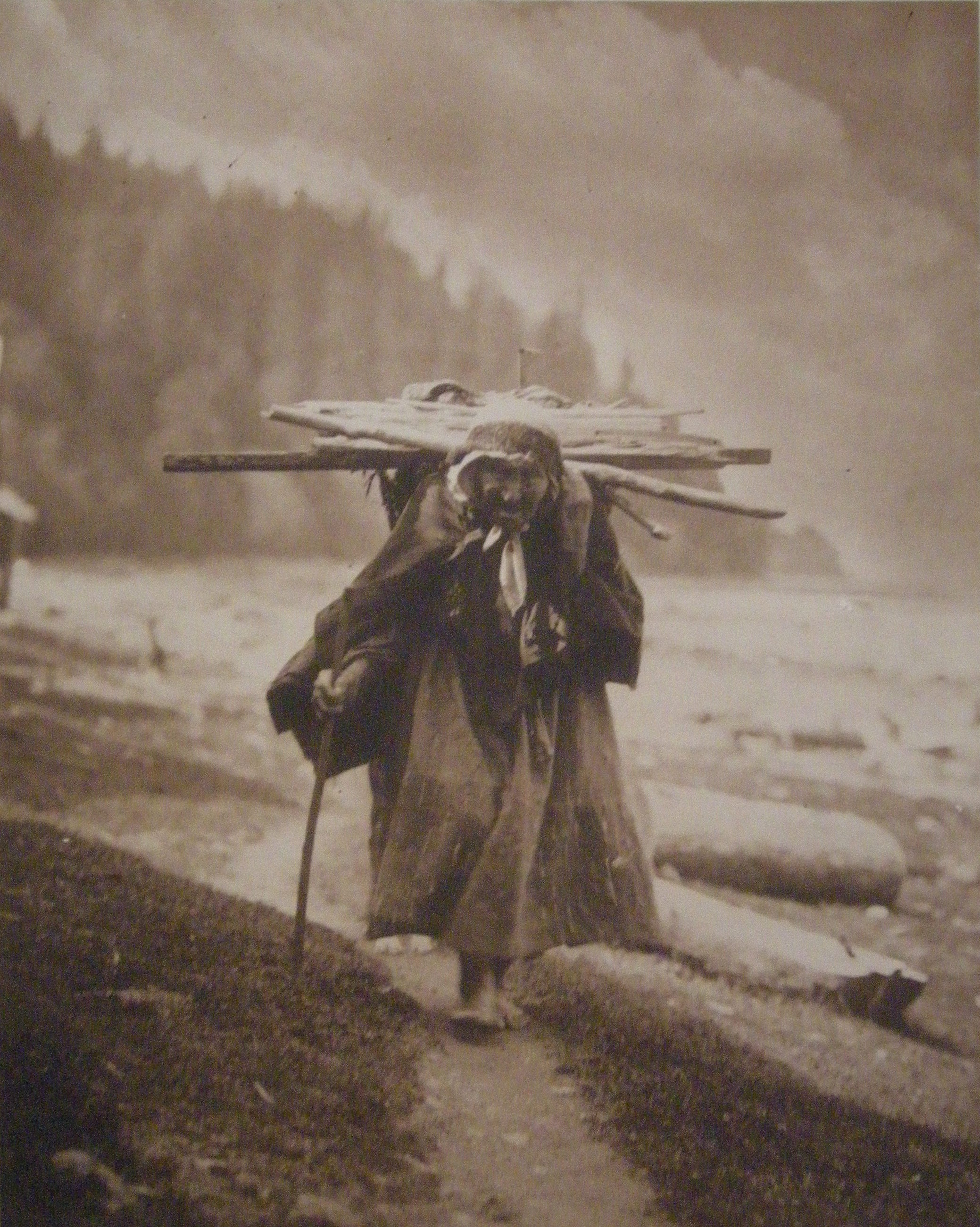
Photograph of a Makah woman carrying wood along Neah Bay in 1908 by Asahel Curtis

The name "Neah" refers to the Makah Chief Dee-ah, pronounced Neah in the Klallam language. The town is named for the water body Neah Bay, which acquired its name in the early 19th century. A number of names were used for the bay before it was established as Neah Bay. In August 1788 Captain Charles Duncan, a British trader, charted a bay at the location of Neah Bay, but did not give it a name. In 1790 Manuel Quimper took possession of the bay for Spain and named it "Bahía de Núñez Gaona" in honor of Alonso Núñez de Haro y Peralta, viceroy of New Spain. In 1792 Salvador Fidalgo began to build a Spanish fort on Neah Bay, but the project failed within the year and the cannon and supplies were transported to the more northerly colony of Santa Cruz de Nuca. While Fidalgo was working on the fort George Vancouver charted but did not stop at the bay. American traders called Neah Bay "Poverty Cove". In 1841 the United States Exploring Expedition under Charles Wilkes mapped the region and named Neah Bay "Scarborough Harbour" in honor of Captain James Scarborough of the Hudson's Bay Company, who had provided assistance to the expedition. The Wilkes map contained the first use of the word "Neah", but for the bay's island, now called Waadah Island. The bay was first called Neah in 1847 by Captain Henry Kellett during his reorganization of the British Admiralty charts. Kellett spelled it "Neeah Bay".

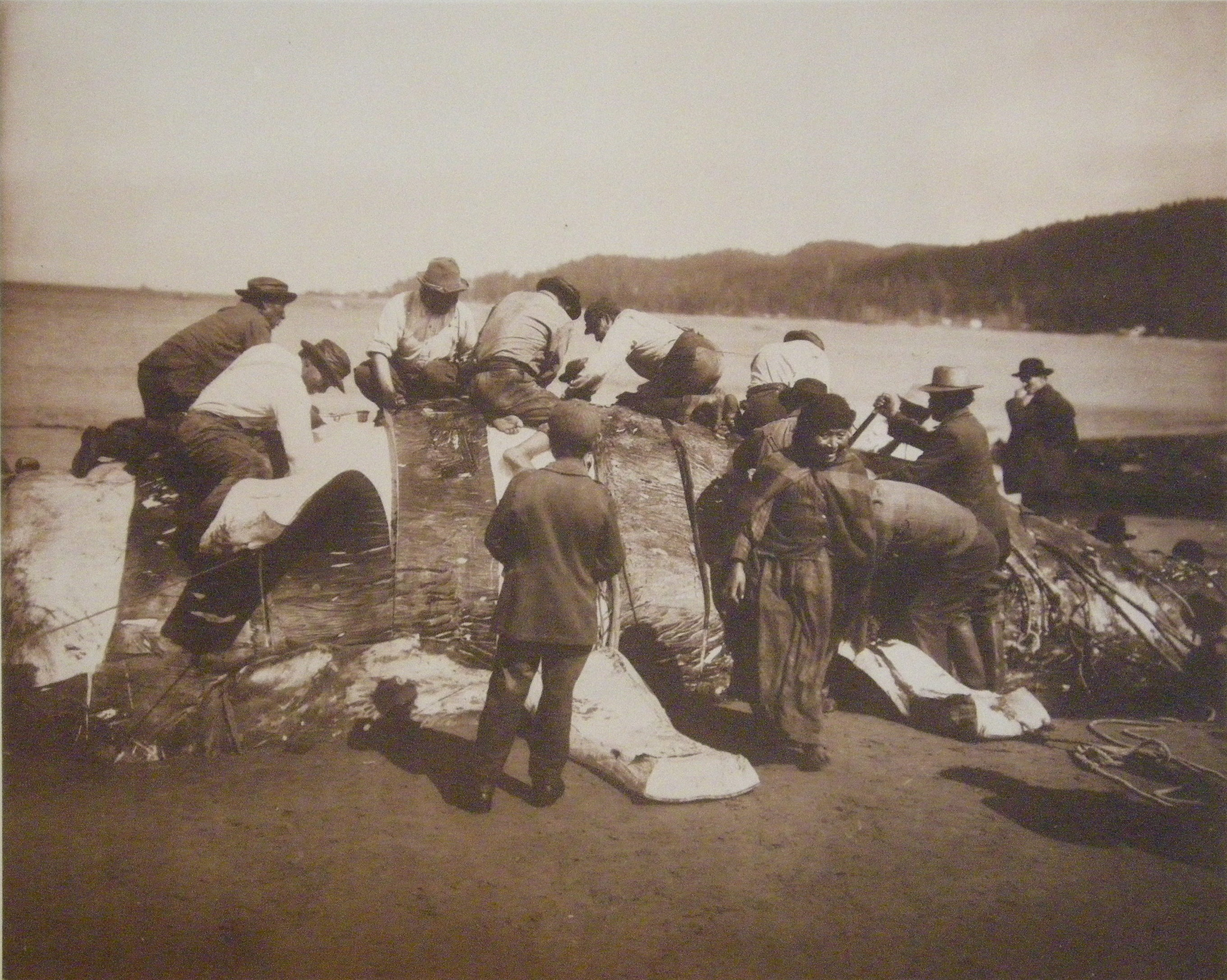
Indian whalers stripping their prey at Neah Bay - 1910

In 1929, the Neah Bay Dock Company, a subsidiary of the Puget Sound Navigation Company, owned a wharf and a hotel at Neah Bay.

In 2020, due to the COVID-19 pandemic, Neah Bay and the Makah Reservation were closed to anyone who was not a Makah tribal member. The tribal council decided to reopen the reservation on 15 March 2022.

== Economy ==
The local economy is sustained mostly by fishing and tourism. During the summer Neah Bay is a popular fishing area for sports fishermen. Any visitor to the Makah land must buy a recreational permit for US$20. The permit is good for the calendar year.

Fishing for bottom fish, such as ling cod, kelp greenling, black rockfish (sea bass), china rockfish, yellow eye and canary rockfish, among others. Ling cod fishing is good in spring and summer, while salmon fishing is good during summer runs. However, Neah Bay is mostly known for the best halibut fishing in the lower 48 states. The United States halibut season generally lasts a handful of days in May and June, ending when a seasonal quota is attained. When the United States halibut season is closed, some fishermen obtain Canadian fishing licenses and launch from Neah Bay, running approximately 10 miles (16 km) to the portion of Swiftsure Bank that lies in Canadian waters.

Popular spots for halibut include "The Garbage Dump", located just inside the Strait of Juan de Fuca, and Swiftsure Bank — a few miles out into the open ocean. Larger boats (including many of the commercial charter boats available) often travel 30 nautical miles (60 km) or more into the open ocean, to such places as Blue Dot and 72-Square.

== Arts and culture ==
Neah Bay's significant attraction is the Makah Museum. It houses and interprets artifacts from a Makah village partly buried by a mudslide around 1750 at Ozette, providing a snapshot of pre-contact tribal life. The museum includes a replica longhouse, canoes, basketry and whaling and fishing gear. Many people visit Neah Bay to hike the Cape Trail or camp at Hobuck Beach. While camping, tourists spend time surfing and fishing.

== Coast Guard ==
The United States Coast Guard maintains a base in Neah Bay on the Makah Indian reservation. The base is maintained for search and rescue, environmental protection and maritime law enforcement operations.

The Coast Guard cutter stationed in Cleveland, Ohio is named the Neah Bay (WTGB-105).

=== Response tug ===
In order to prevent disabled ships and barges from grounding and causing possible oil spills in the western Strait of Juan de Fuca or off the outer coast, the state funded an emergency response tug stationed at Neah Bay. It has saved 41 vessels since its introduction in 1999.

== Notable residents ==
- Edward Eugene Claplanhoo — former chairman of the Makah Tribal Council
- Peter DePoe — drummer for Native American rock group Redbone.
- Bob Greene — second-to-last surviving Makah veteran of World War II.
- Ben Johnson, former chairman and member of the Makah Tribal Council (1998–2000, 2001–2007).
