= Makah Reservation =

Indian reservation in Washington, US

Coordinates: 48°19′20″N 124°37′57″W

- Indian reservation
- Location in Washington
- Tribe: Makah Tribe
- Country: United States
- State: Washington
- County: Clallam
- Headquarters: Neah Bay

Government
  - Body: Tribal Council
  - Chairman: John Ides, Sr.
  - Vice-Chairman: Keith Johnson
  - Treasurer: Leah Neuneker

Population (2017)
  - Total: 1,559
- Website: makah.com

The Makah Reservation is an Indian reservation of the Makah people, located on the northwestern tip of the Olympic Peninsula in Clallam County, Washington, United States. The northern boundary of the reservation is the Strait of Juan de Fuca. The western boundary is the Pacific Ocean. It has a land area of 121.451 square kilometres (46.892 sq mi) and a 2000 census resident population of 1,356 persons. Its largest community is Neah Bay.

The Makah in the early nineteenth century inhabited Cape Flattery, Washington. According to the Lewis and Clark expedition, they then numbered some 2,000. The Makah are the southernmost of the Wakashan linguistic group, and the only member of this family living within the current boundaries of the United States. Other bands are First Nations peoples on the west coast of Vancouver Island, British Columbia.

In 1855, the Makah ceded the majority of their lands to the United States, except a small area on Cape Flattery that was set aside as a reservation. Today most of the 1,600 Makah in the United States live on the Makah Reservation; their main tribal income is from forestry.

Non-tribal members visiting the reservation's trails and beaches are required to purchase a pass. Guests on official business are given a free pass.

== History ==
=== Names ===
The Makah call themselves qʷidiččaʔa·tx̌, which roughly translates to "people who live by the rocks and seagulls". However, their neighbors referred to them as the "Makah" meaning "generous with food" which is the name now more commonly used when addressing the tribe.

The Makah originally resided in present-day Washington and occupied multiple villages all throughout the northwestern tip of the Olympic Peninsula.

=== Treaty of Neah Bay ===
On January 31, 1855, Governor Isaac I. Stevens met with Makah leaders and members, and presented them with the Neah Bay Treaty. The treaty set aside what is now the Makah Reservation for the Makah people to reside in. Though the treaty included many rules and regulations, one of the most well known agreements in the treaty is that it allowed the Makah to legally hunt whales, making it the only treaty between the United States and a tribe that allows for the hunting of whales. In signing and agreeing to the Neah Bay Treaty, the Makah gave up 300,000 acres of their land to the United States in return for a $30,000 annuity, and other agreements such as the right to whaling and sealing.

== Culture ==
=== Ozette Village ===
One of the most well known, Ozette, was a crucial location for Makah survival. It was the most popular area for whale hunting which was a traditionally significant food source for the tribe. Around roughly 1560 CE or 1700 CE, a mudslide buried Ozette until about 1970 when a storm revealed the village hidden under layers of earth and mud. Archaeologists, with the help from local Makah members and students, worked for years to carefully restore the village as best they could, and learned much about Makah cultures and traditions.

==== Architecture ====
The excavation of the Ozette village uncovered the traditional longhouses which were roughly 30 by 70 feet and where often composed of five different living quarters, with a fire for cooking purposes at the center of each room. Because the Makah people often moved with the seasons, the longhouses were engineered in a way that allowed for easy removal of certain parts of the house so that they may be utilized in other locations.

== Geography ==
There are five major villages on the Makah Reservation: Waatch (waʔač̓), Sooes (c̓u·yas), Deah (di·ya), Ozette (ʔuse·ʔił), and Bahaada (biʔidʔa).

=== Climate ===
Based on data from the last ten years, the temperature on the Makah Reservation typically ranges from the mid thirties to high sixties (°F), so temperatures are generally on the cooler side all year round with the exception of a few instances. Humidity ranges between 79% and 87%, making it a generally humid location. Furthermore, precipitation tends to be heavier in the winter and spring months, especially in November, December, January, and March where the average precipitation days are higher than other months.

== Population ==
The total recorded population is 1,612 individuals of which the average age comes to roughly 32.6 years. The majority of the population comes from one race where American Indian and Alaska Native, and White are the most predominant. Hispanics or Latinos make up around 120 individuals.

118 individuals are with veteran status; the majority having served in the Vietnam War, or Gulf War in the 1990s.

== Education and economy ==
=== Education ===
One of the unique curriculums at the Makah Reservation is the Makah Language Program (MLP) which focuses on carrying and passing along the traditional Makah language, Qʷi·qʷidiččaq, to students.

Out of the 927 individuals twenty-five years or older, 86.4% have at least graduated high school and 14.1% have earned a bachelor’s degree or higher.

The education department of the Makah Tribe tends to give preference for scholarships to students living on the reservation because there is a better chance that they will return to the reservation and to work for the tribe. Furthermore, students are motivated to seek employment and study areas that would benefit the tribe such as environmental sciences and fisheries.

=== Employment and income ===
The unemployment rate is 16.4% for individuals sixteen years of age and older, and the median income for Makah households is roughly $47,000. A rise in tourism, which typically occurs around the summer, leads to a rise in employment for Makah members because there are more employment opportunities. Popular tourist destinations located on the reservation are another major source of income for the Makah. A “Recreation Permit” of twenty dollars is required to access any of the multiple spots throughout the reservation and it boosts the tribe’s economy.

Of 605 employed individuals, 412 work in the public sector, and 118 work in the private sector.

== Popular attractions and events ==
Each year, the Makah celebrate what they call “Makah Days” which occurs on the weekend nearest to August 26. June 2, 1924, was the day in which the Makah were officially given their right of suffrage, however, the Makah celebrated the anniversary of becoming United States citizens on August 26, 1913. The Makah Tribe comes together to organize many events and spectacles for these days, and they welcome others to celebrate with them.

Neah Bay beaches, such as Hobuck Beach and Shi-Shi Beach, are also popular destinations for many visitors. The Hobuck Beach features the Hobuck Beach Resort for visitors, and they can also choose to take part in events such as the Hobuck Hoedown for entertainment. Shi-Shi Beach is most popular for its trail which is 2.5 miles long and features many sights along the way.

The Cape Flattery Trail is one of the more well-known trails on the Makah Reservation. It has multiple observation points and there is a clear view of Tatoosh Island, an island that is also a part of the Makah Reservation.

The Makah Cultural and Research Center is the museum on the reservation that opened in 1979 and is home to many artifacts relating to Makah history and culture. Many of the objects and exhibits come from the Ozette Archaeological Site and give insight into the traditional Makah way of life. An admission fee is required to enter the museum and it helps support the museum’s financial needs.

== See also ==
- Indigenous languages of the Americas
- Nuu-chah-nulth
- Makah
- Makah language
