= Makah language =

Wakashan language

Makah
- qʷi·qʷi·diččaq
- Native to: United States
- Region: Northwestern corner of the Olympic Peninsula of Washington state, on the south side of the Strait of Juan de Fuca
- Ethnicity: 2,220 Makah (2000 census)
- Extinct: 2002, with the death of Ruth E. Claplanhoo
- Revival: L2 speakers exist
- Language family: Wakashan: Southern; Makah

Official status
- Official language in: Makah Tribe

Language codes
- ISO 639-3: myh
- Glottolog: maka1318
- ELP: Makah
- Map of Wakashan languages

- Makah is classified as Critically Endangered by the UNESCO Atlas of the World's Languages in Danger.

Makah (autonym: qʷi·qʷi·diččaq, IPA: [qʷiqʷidɪt͡ʃt͡ʃəq]) is a Wakashan language spoken by the Makah. Makah has not been spoken as a first language since 2002, when its last fluent native speaker died. However, it survives as a second language, and the Makah tribe is attempting to revive the language, including through preschool classes. The endonym for the language is qʷi·qʷi·diččaq.

The Makah reside in the northwestern corner of the Olympic Peninsula of Washington on the south side of the Strait of Juan de Fuca. It is closely related to Nuu-chah-nulth and Ditidaht, which are languages of the First Nations of the west coast of Vancouver Island on the north side of the strait, in the Canadian province of British Columbia. Makah is the only member of the Wakashan language family in the United States, with the other members spoken in British Columbia, from Vancouver Island to the Central Coast region.

Makah, Nuu-chah-nulth and Ditidaht belong to the Southern Nootkan branch of the Wakashan family. The Northern Wakashan languages, which are Kwak'wala, Heiltsuk–Oowekyala and Haisla, are spoken farther north, beyond the territory of the Nuu-chah-nulth.

== Phonology ==
The phonemes (distinctive sounds) of Makah are presented below in the Makah alphabet; if the symbol in the native alphabet differs from the IPA symbol, the IPA equivalent will be given in brackets.

=== Consonants ===
		Labial	Alveolar			Post- alveolar	Velar		Uvular		Glottal
		Labial	plain	sibilant	lateral	Post- alveolar	plain	labial	plain	labial	Glottal
Plosive/ Affricate	voiceless	p	t	c [ts]	ƛ [tɬ]	č [tʃ]	k	kʷ	q	qʷ	ʔ
Plosive/ Affricate	ejective	p̓ [pʼ]	t̓ [tʼ]	c̓ [tsʼ]	ƛ̓ [tɬʼ]	č̓ [tʃʼ]	k̓ [kʼ]	k̓ʷ [kʷʼ]	q̓ [qʼ]	q̓ʷ [qʷʼ]	ʔ
Plosive/ Affricate	voiced	b	d								
Fricative				s	ł [ɬ]	š [ʃ]	x	xʷ	x̌ [χ]	x̌ʷ [χʷ]	
Approximant					l		y [j]		w		

Makah has no nasal phonemes, a trait rare among the world's languages that it shares with the neighboring Quileute language.

=== Vowels ===
Vowel phonemes
	Front		Central		Back	
	short	long	short	long	short	long
Close	ɪ	iː			ʊ	uː
Mid	ɛ	æː	ə		ɔ	oː
Open				aː		

There are five phonologically short vowels (written ⟨a e i o u⟩ and pronounced [ə], [ɛ], [ɪ], [ɔ], and [ʊ]) and five phonologically long vowels (written ⟨a· e· i· o· u·⟩ and pronounced [a], [æ], [i], [o], and [u]). There are also six diphthongs (written ⟨aw ay ey iy oy uy⟩, pronounced [aw], [aj], [e], [iː], [ɔj], and [uːj]).

== Morphology ==
Like other Wakashan languages, Makah inflects verbs for evidentiality, indicating the level and source of the speaker's knowledge about a statement. Some examples are shown in the following table:

Example	Translation	Evidential
hi·dawʔaƛwa·d	"I hear he found it"	-wa·t, hearsay
pu·pu·q̓adʔi	"he's blowing a whistle"	-q̓adi, auditory
č̓apaccaqil	"It looks like a canoe"	-caqił, uncertain visual evidence, as trying to make out something at a distance
haʔuk̓aƛpi·dic	"I see you ate"	-pi·t, inference from physical evidence
dudu·k̓aƛx̌a·š	"He's probably singing"	-x̌a·-š, inferred probability

Alongside those examples, compare corresponding sentences without the evidentials: hi·dawʔal, "he found it"; č̓apac̓, "it's a canoe"; haʔuk̓alic, "you're eating"; dudu·k̓al, "he's singing".

Words in Makah encode a lot information; Davidson (2002) outlines the formal word structure below (pg. 160),

base	core suffixes	aspect	peripheral suffixes	aspect	clitic sequence
unextended word			peripheral suffixes	aspect	clitic sequence
expanded unextended word					clitic sequence
extended word

The 'unextended word' consists of a root (the 'base'), lexical suffixes, and aspectual suffixes. It carries the 'dictionary meaning' of the word, while the clitics represent what can be thought of as 'inflections' for other grammatical categories.

- Lexical suffixes: Come in two varieties; nuclear, which can change the base's meaning or part of speech, and restrictive, which add to the base's meaning without altering the word class. The latter include locational and directional suffixes.
- Aspectual suffixes: While they vary in realization, the extended word can mark for the following aspects,
  Perfective, Imperfective, Graduative, Durative, Continuative, Repetitive, & Iterative

The 'expanded unextended' word is formed by the addition of a peripheral suffix, which can change the part of speech while and often contains an aspectual value. These suffixes 'cross-cut' the core/nuclear distinction. The order of the clitic sequence is as follows:

=Diminutive=Temporal=Causative=Possessive=Passive-Inverse=Tense=Mood=Pronominal=Habitual=3rd Person Plural=Responsive='again'

The modal-pronominal clitics are often combined, creating a separate set of pronominal clitics for each mood. Makah marks for the indicative, purposive, quotative, subordinate, inferential, mirative, conditional, relative, content interrogative and polar interrogative moods.

== Bibliography ==
- Renker, Ann M. and Gunther, Erna (1990). "Makah". In "Northwest Coast", ed. Wayne Suttles. Vol. 7 of Handbook of North American Indians, ed. William C. Sturtevant. Washington, D.C.: Smithsonian Institution.
