= Makah =

Indigenous people of the Pacific Northwest Coast

qʷidiččaʔa·tx̌
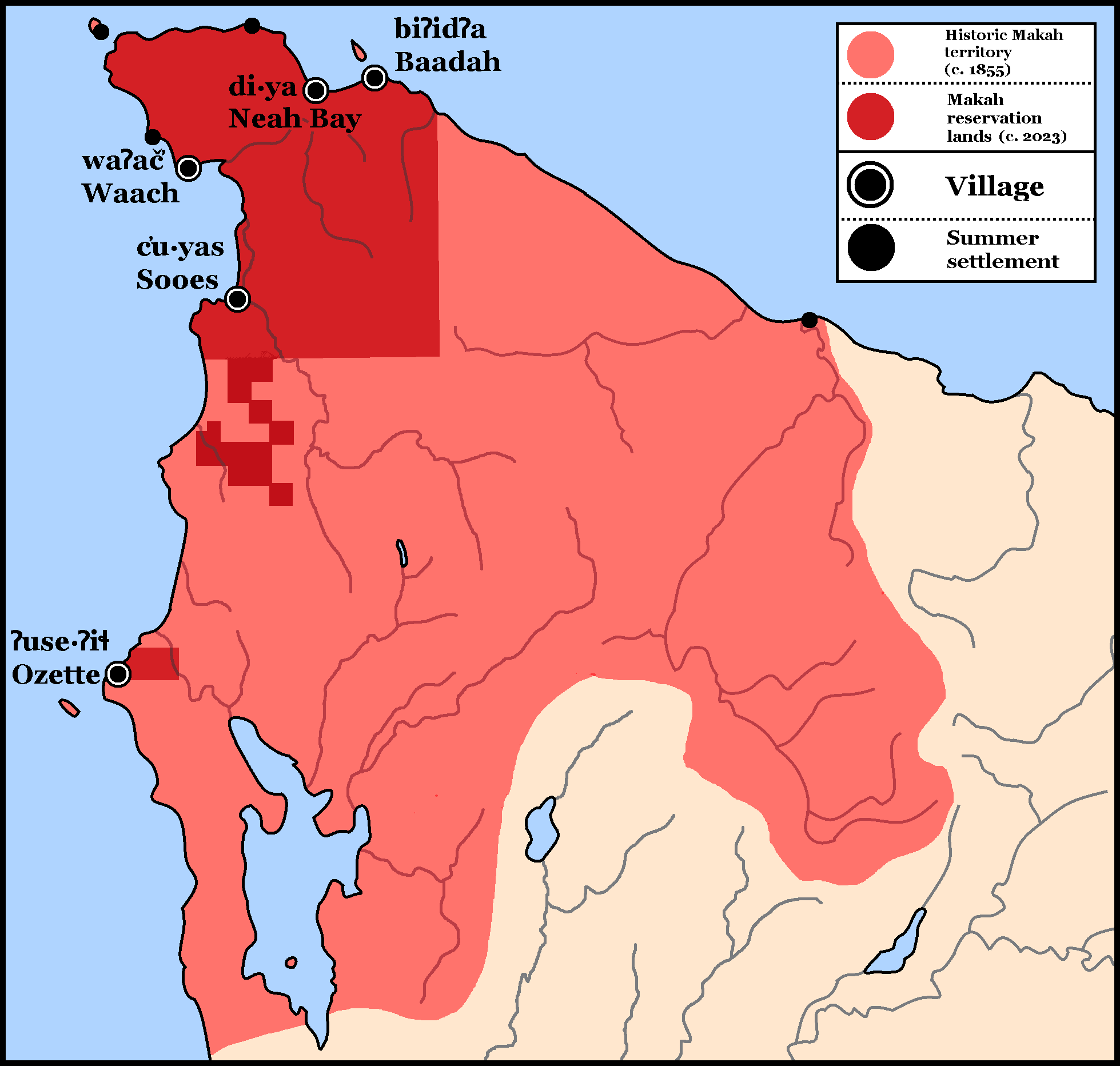
- Makah territory (light red, c. 1855) overlaid with current reservation lands (dark red)

Total population
- 1,213

Regions with significant populations
- United States (Washington)

Languages
- English, formerly Makah

Religion
- Christianity, incl. Syncretism

Related ethnic groups
- Nuu-chah-nulth, Ditidaht

The Makah (/məˈkɑː/; Makah: qʷidiččaʔa·tx̌ IPA: [qʷɪdɪt͡ʃt͡ʃəʔatχ]) are an Indigenous people of the Pacific Northwest Coast living in Washington, in the northwestern part of the continental United States. They are enrolled in the federally recognized Makah Indian Tribe of the Makah Indian Reservation, commonly known as the Makah Tribe.

Linguistically, their language is closely related to the Nuu-chah-nulth and Ditidaht languages of the West Coast of Vancouver Island, which are spoken across the Strait of Juan de Fuca in British Columbia, Canada.

== Etymology and name ==
The Makah people refer to themselves as the qʷidiččaʔa·tx̌, which translates to somewhere near to "the people who live by the rocks and seagulls". Other thought translations include "the people who live on the cape by the seagulls", and "people of the point", as well as several others. This has sometimes been anglicized as Kwih-dich-chuh-ahtx.

The English name, "Makah," is an exonym derived from the S'Klallam language name for the Makah, màq̓áʔa. It means "generous with food".

== History ==
=== Pre-colonial ===
Archaeological research suggests that Makah people have inhabited the area now known as Neah Bay for more than 6,000 years. Traditionally, the Makah lived in villages consisting of large longhouses made from western red cedar. These longhouses had cedar-plank walls which could be tilted or removed to provide ventilation or light. The cedar tree was of great value to Makah, who also used its bark to make water-resistant clothing and hats. Cedar roots were used in basket making. Whole trees were carved out to make canoes to hunt seals, gray whales and humpback whales.

Makah acquired much of their food from the ocean. Their diet consisted of whale, seal, fish, and a wide variety of shellfish. They would also hunt deer, elk, and bear from the surrounding forests. Women also gathered a wide variety of nuts, berries and edible plants and roots for their foods.

=== Japanese castaways ===
In 1834, a dismasted, rudderless ship from Japan ran aground near Cape Flattery. The Makah took the three survivors of the broken ship and held them as slaves for several months before taking them to Fort Vancouver. From there, the United States transported them by ship to London and eventually China, but they never reached Japan again.

=== Treaty of Neah Bay ===
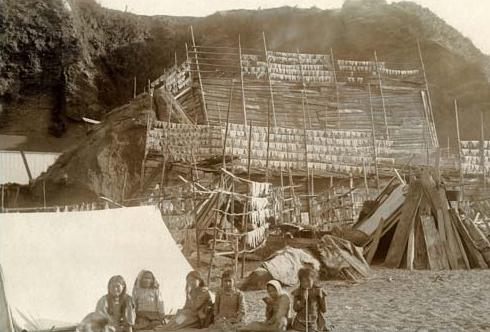
A Makah settlement, c. 1900

On January 31, 1855, government-selected Makah representatives signed the Treaty of Neah Bay with the U.S. federal government, ceding much of their traditional lands. The treaty required the Makah to be restricted to the Makah Reservation (at 48°19′20″N 124°37′57″W in Clallam County), banned slavery, and preserved the Makah people's rights to hunt whales and seals in the region. The Makah language was not used during the negotiation of the treaty, and the government used the S'Klallam-language name to refer to the tribe, rather than the Makah-language endoynm.

=== Ozette village ===
In the early 17th century, a mudslide engulfed part of a Makah village near Lake Ozette. The oral history of the Makah mentions a "great slide" which engulfed a portion of Ozette long ago. The mudslide preserved several houses and their contents in a collapsed state until the 1970s, when they were excavated by the Makah and archaeologists from Washington State University. Over 55,000 artifacts were recovered, representing many activities of the Makah, from whale and seal hunting to salmon and halibut fishing. Artifacts included toys, games, and bows and arrows.

Archaeological test pits were excavated at the Ozette site in 1966 and 1967 by Richard Daugherty. However, it was not until 1970 that it became apparent what was buried there. After a storm in February 1970, tidal erosion exposed hundreds of well-preserved wooden artifacts. The excavation of the Ozette site began shortly after. University students worked with the Makah under the direction of archaeologists using pressurized water to remove mud from six buried long houses. The excavation went on for 11 years.

It produced more than 55,000 artifacts, many of which are on display in the Makah Cultural and Research Center. Opened in 1979, the museum displays replicas of cedar long houses as well as whaling, fishing, and sealing canoes.

== Culture ==
Much of what is known about the traditional way of life of the Makah is derived from their oral traditions. Abundant archeological evidence excavated at the Ozette village site has also provided great insight into traditional Makah life.

Historically, the structure of Makah society is a class system; people in the middle or lower classes could gain better social status by marrying into the upper levels. The community was in mostly a cognatic descent structure.

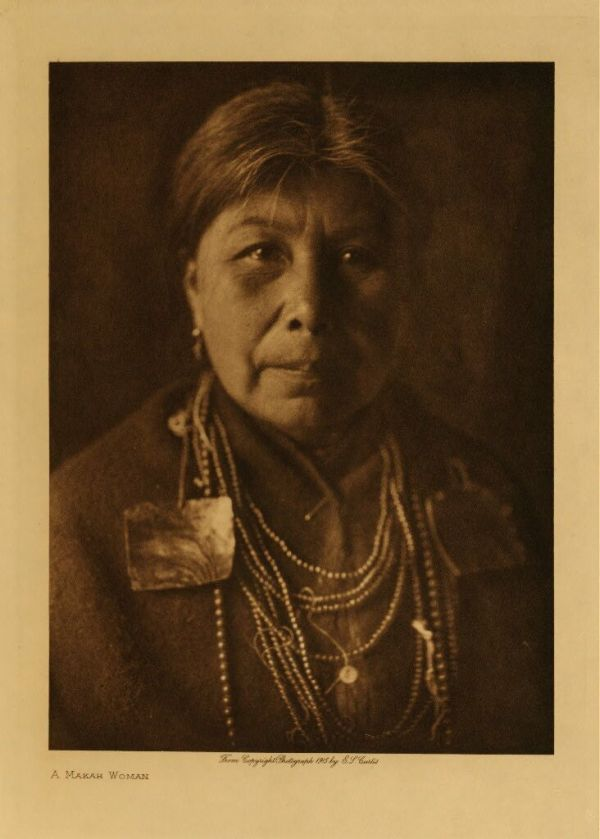
A Makah woman, c. 1900

The Makah traditional family consisted of parents and children living in a particular area. Members of Makah families were ranked in society according to their relationship to the chief of the tribe. There were no stratifications in gender roles, participating in the hunting of whales and other livestock. Although men were more fishermen and hunters, women's activities centered on gathering resources for the family.

=== Whaling ===
Makah oral history relates that their tradition of aboriginal whaling has been suspended and re-established several times. Most recently, the practice was suspended in the 1920s because the commercial whaling industry had depleted the stocks of humpback and gray whales; all hunting was called off.

After the gray whale was removed from the Endangered Species List, the Makah re-asserted their whaling rights. With the support and guidance of the United States government and the International Whaling Commission, the Makah successfully hunted a gray whale on May 17, 1999. According to federal law, the Makah are entitled to hunt and kill one baleen whale, typically a gray whale, each year. Archaeological records and oral history indicate a significant number of humpback whales were historically hunted as well. The Makah had gone over 70 years without catching a whale.

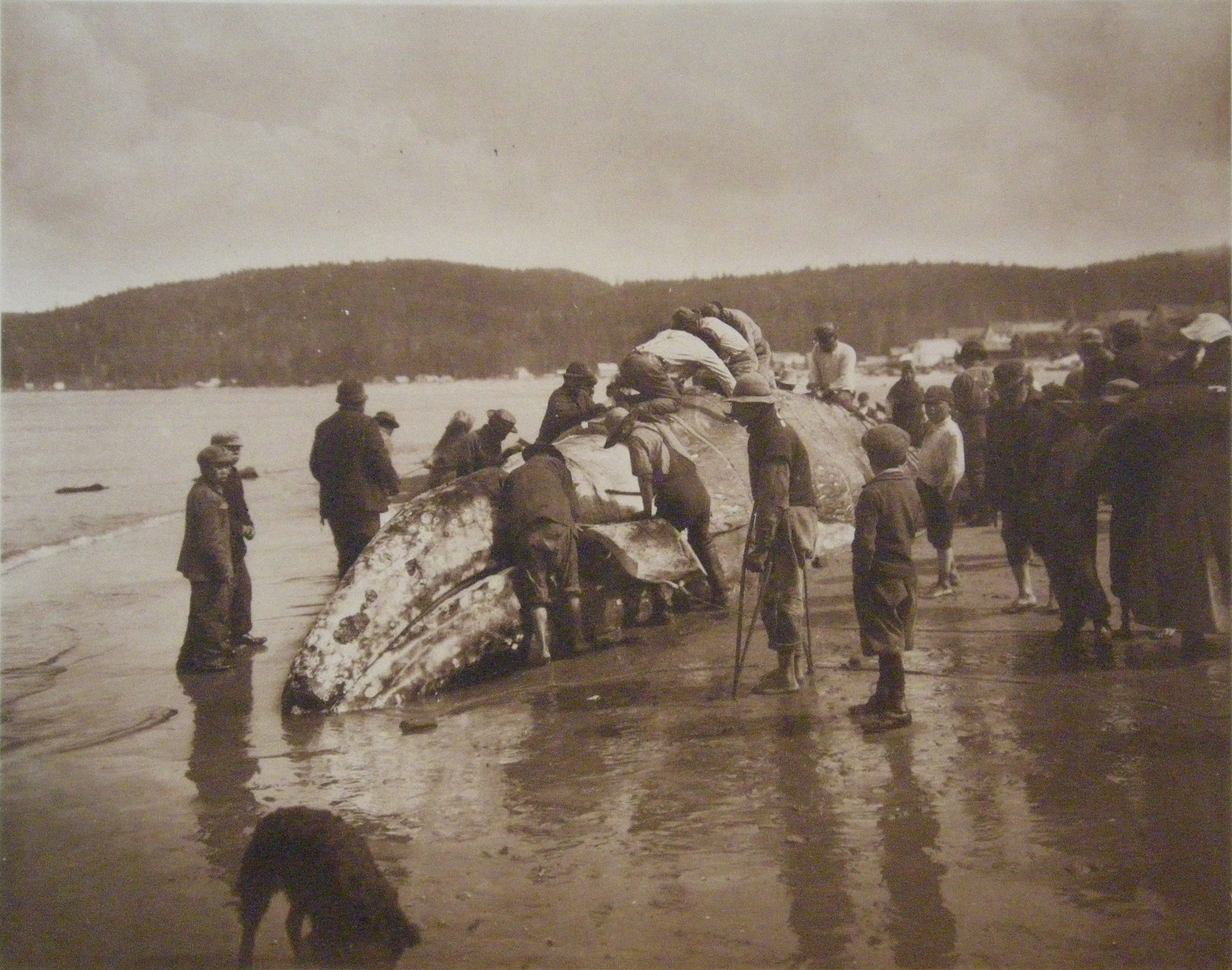
Makah whalers, c. 1910

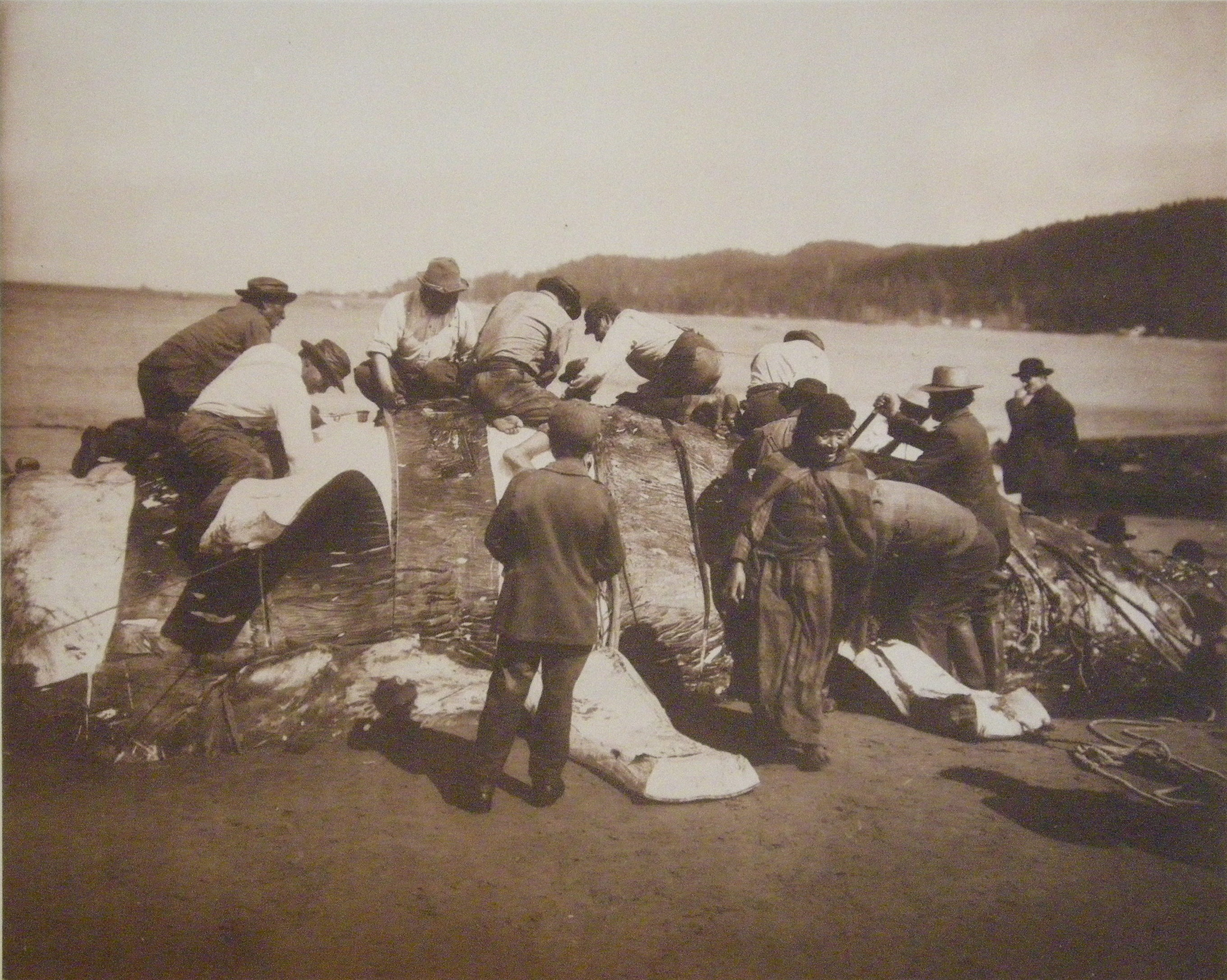
Makah whalers stripping the flesh from a whale, c. 1910.

The Makah whaling technique is difficult and labor-intensive. The men hunt from cedar canoes, each seating six to nine people and more recently, from small fishing vessels. They take these into the Pacific Ocean adjacent to their reservation territory. Various traditional criteria are used to determine the best whale to harvest. By counting the whale's exhalations, the hunters determine when the whale is about to dive, and determine from this the best time to strike. Approaching the whale's left side, the hunter strikes when the whale is 3–4 feet deep, to avoid the force of the whale's tail. The harpoon is 16–18 feet long, composed of two pieces of yew wood spliced together. Historically, hunters used a mussel shell tip, in conjunction with barbs from elk horns.

Since the late 20th century, hunters have used a steel "yankee style" head, but they have retained the yew wood shaft because of its flexibility, water resistance, and strength. Held fast to the whale, the harpoon shaft comes loose, to be recovered later, and a line is thrown from the canoe with seal skin floats attached, to provide drag to weaken the whale. In the past, a series of smaller lances were used to repeatedly strike the whale, gradually weakening and killing it, often over a period of hours, and in some cases, days. Recently, hunters have adopted use of a big-game rifle after the harpoon strike, to ensure a more efficient kill. The International Whaling Commission permits four cartridges in whaling: .458 Winchester Magnum, .460 Weatherby Magnum, .50 BMG, and the .577 Tyrannosaur, which the Makah fired in the 1999 hunt.

Once the whale has been killed, a crew member called the "diver" jumps into the water and cuts a hole through the bottom and top of the whale's jaw, to which a tow line and float are attached. This holds the whale's mouth shut and prevents the carcass from filling with water and sinking. Hunters tow the whale to shore, where it is received by members of the village.

Traditional ceremonies and songs are performed to welcome the whale's spirit. Following this, the whale is divided in a precise and traditional fashion, with certain families having ownership of particular cuts. The "saddle piece" located midway between the center of the back and the tail is the property of the harpooner. It is taken to his home where a special ceremony is performed. The meat and oil are distributed to community members, and a great deal of it is consumed during a potlatch.

The Makah assert that their right to whaling is guaranteed in the 1855 Treaty of Neah Bay, which states in part: "The right of taking fish and of whaling or sealing at usual and accustomed grounds and stations is further secured to said Indians in common with all citizens of the United States."

In September 2007, five members of the Makah tribe shot a gray whale using a .460 caliber rifle, similar to that used in hunting elephants, despite court-imposed regulations governing the Makah hunt. The whale died within 12 hours, sinking while heading out to sea after being confiscated and cut loose by the United States Coast Guard. The tribal council denounced the killing and announced their intention to try the individuals in tribal court.

=== Ethnobotany ===
Makah women chew the roots and leaves of Viola adunca while giving birth.

=== Contemporary culture ===
In 1936, the Makah Tribe signed the Makah Constitution, accepting the Indian Reorganization Act of 1934 and establishing an elected tribal government. The constitution provided for a five-member Tribal Council. Each year the council elects a Tribal Chairperson. The Council develops and passes laws for the Makah Reservation.

The Makah Tribe hosts its annual major public gathering, Makah Days, in late August. It features a grand parade and street fair as well as canoe races, traditional games, singing, dancing, feasting, and fireworks.

Many Makah tribal members derive most of their income from fishing. Makah fish for salmon, halibut, Pacific whiting, and other marine fish. This makes them particularly vulnerable to effects of global warming: ocean acidification disrupts the development of the shells of molluscs (the fishes' main food source) and warming waters the salmon run. In response, the Makah tribe is drawing on traditional knowledge to create action plans for climate resilience that center tribal socioeconomic priorities. With the Hoh, Quileute, and Quinault Indian Nation, as well as the scientific community, the Makah conduct climate research at and monitor the Olympic Coast National Marine Sanctuary.

== Language ==
The Makah language is the Indigenous language spoken by the Makah people. The endonym for the language is qʷi·qʷi·diččaq.

Makah linguistically belongs to the Southern Nootkan branch of the Wakashan family of languages. It is also the only Wakashan language in the United States. Other tribes speaking Wakashan are located in British Columbia, Canada, immediately across the Strait of Juan de Fuca on the west coast of Vancouver Island, and northwards as far as that province's Central Coast region.

Makah has been extinct as a first language since 2002, when its last fluent native speaker died. However, it survives as a second language. The Makah Tribe is also working to revive the language, and has established preschool classes to teach its children.

== Reservation ==
The Makah Tribe owns the Makah Indian Reservation on the northwest tip of the Olympic Peninsula; it includes Tatoosh Island. They live in and around the town of Neah Bay, Washington, a small fishing village.

Tribal census data from 1999 show that the Makah Tribe has 1,214 enrolled members; some 1,079 live on the reservation. The unemployment rate on the reservation is approximately 51%, which drops slightly in the summer due to seasonal employment related to tourism.

== Literary and cultural references ==
Several books have explored Makah history, usually from the arrival of white settlers onward. The historical-adventure novel When Wolf Comes (2009) by John Pappas gives a glimpse into the lives of the Makah people of 1801. Young adult book Ghost Canoe (1998) by Will Hobbs takes place on and near the reservation, while Indian Days at Neah Bay by James G. McCurdy details life in Neah Bay in the early days of mandatory schooling from the perspective of the schoolteacher's son. The children's book Written in Stone (2014) by Rosanne Parry takes place in the 1920s, featuring an orphaned Makah girl who works to preserve her people's culture. Meanwhile, Arlyn Conly's memoir Never Trust a White Man takes place in the late 1950s, describing Neah Bay High School through the eyes of a white home economics teacher. French writer Frédéric Roux's novel L'hiver indien (2007) (Indian Winter, éditions Grasset & Fasquelle) explores the struggle between tradition and modernity for the Makah in northwestern Washington. In the realm of non-fiction, Voices of a Thousand People (2002) by Patricia Pierce Erikson with Helma Ward & Kirk Wachendorf recounts the founding of The Makah Cultural and Research Center and the work to preserve their heritage.

Beyond books, the final scene of Jim Jarmusch's 1995 film Dead Man takes place in a reconstructed Makah village. Many of the actors featured in the scene are Makah tribal members; dialogue is in the Makah language. Additionally, the song "The Renegade" by Ian and Sylvia recounts conflict in the life of the son of a "Makah mother who marries a white man" though the original lyric is "klahowya", a greeting in Chinook Wawa, a widely used trade language of the Pacific Northwest

== See also ==
- Bob Greene (Makah)
- Ditidaht people
- Hoh people
- Nuu-chah-nulth people
- Robert T. Paine (zoologist)
