= Eric Berlow =

American scientist

Eric L. Berlow
- Education: Brown University (AB 1984); Oregon State University (PhD 1995)
- Known for: TED Talks
- Scientific career
- Fields: Ecology; Complexity; Food Webs
- Workplaces: University of California, Berkeley; Sierra Nevada Research Institute; Pacific Ecoinformatics and Computational Ecology Laboratory; US Geological Survey
- Doctoral advisor: Jane Lubchenco and Bruce Menge

Eric L. Berlow is an American ecologist and data scientist. He co-founded a visual data interface company, which was acquired by Rakuten Inc. in 2016. He now runs Vibrant Data Labs, a social impact data science group currently focused the building on an open-source framework for tracking the flows of money to climate mitigation and resilience efforts on the ground. Prior to Vibrant Data Labs, Berlow was the founding director of the University of California's first science and education institute inside Yosemite National Park which facilitated efforts to leverage data for informing conservation policy and natural resource management. Berlow is internationally recognized for his research on ecological complexity, with articles in Nature, Science, and Proceedings of the National Academy of Sciences. He is best known for his TED talks on simplifying complexity and finding hidden patterns in complex data. Berlow has received a TED Fellowship, a TED Senior Fellowship, an Alexander Von Humboldt Fellowship, a National Science Foundation Post-doctoral Fellowship, and a National Center for Ecological Analysis and Synthesis Fellowship. He was named one of the top 100 Creatives by Origin magazine.

== Education ==
Berlow completed his undergraduate studies at Brown University in 1988, earning a B.A. degree in biology. He received a Doctor of Philosophy degree from Oregon State University in 1995 in marine ecology with a thesis on ecological complexity, supervised by Jane Lubchenco and Bruce A. Menge. He was a National Science Foundation Postdoctoral Fellow at the University of California at Berkeley working with Carla D'Antonio on the ecology of mountain ecosystems in the Sierra Nevada.

== Career ==
Berlow's research career has focused on ecology, food webs, and networks. He was the founding director of the University of California Sierra Nevada Research Station in Yosemite National Park. Examples of his highly cited network ecology publications include a 2009 paper in PNAS for which he was the lead author focused on predicting interaction strengths in food webs, a 1999 paper in Nature on "Strong effects of weak interactions in ecological communities", and a 1994 paper in Ecological Monographs on the keystone species concept. He co-authored a paper that was among the top twenty most cited papers in Environment and Ecology from 1998-2008 entitled "Biodiversity - global biodiversity scenarios for the year 2100". Berlow has also contributed to conservation through his work on alpine meadows and threatened amphibians.

In 2013 Berlow co-founded Vibrant Data Inc., a cloud-based data analytics platform for analyzing complex relationships. As a speaker at the TED Conferences, Berlow has given three presentations on topics including Simplifying Complexity, Mapping Ideas Worth Spreading, and The Ecological Structure of Collaboration.
