= Julia Parrish =

American ecologist and conservation biologist

Julia Kathyrn Parrish
- Education: Duke University
- Scientific career
- Workplaces: University of Washington
- Thesis: The costs and benefits of schooling in fish (1988)

Julia Parrish is an ecologist and conservation biologist at the University of Washington known for her research on seabirds and for her leadership in citizen science. She is an elected fellow of the American Association for the Advancement of Science.

== Education and career ==
Parrish has an undergraduate degree from Carnegie-Mellon (1982) where she studied biochemistry and biophysics. While she was an undergraduate student, she spent a period of time at the Duke University Marine Laboratory, which she credits for guiding her towards getting her Ph.D. at Duke University studying the schooling behavior of fish. Parrish moved to the University of Washington where she holds the Lowell A. and Frankie L. Wakefield Endowed Professorship.

== Research ==
Parrish's research is a combination of observational research and conservation activities. Her graduate research centered on fish where she examined mucus production by the Atlantic silverside fish and the importance of physical location within schooling groups of fish. Parrish began working on Tatoosh Island in 1990 after an invitation to the island from a graduate student in Bob Paine's lab. Her work on the island focuses on common murres, a seabird that forms dense nesting colonies on the island. She has examined interactions between bald eagles and common murres and noted declines in the common murre population as a result of the recovery of the bald eagles. Parrish has modeled the role of aggregating animals in the survival of organisms and its subsequent implications for marine protected areas in the conservation of marine species. Parrish's research has linked dead birds found on the beach with changing seawater off California, the presence of harmful algal blooms, and marine heatwaves. Through the collection of data from volunteers, Parrish was able to link recent observations of the by-the-wind sailor jellyfish with seawater conditions off the beaches of California.

== Citizen science ==
A common murre carcass found along the high wrack being prepared for photographic identification by COASST volunteers

Parrish founded and directs the Coastal Observation and Seabird Survey Team, COASST, a citizen science project started in 1999 that organizes volunteers to gather details about dead birds and marine debris on beaches along the west coast of the United States. Parrish's activities include research into the scale of citizen science projects, the value of in-kind contributions made by volunteers, factors limiting the use of data collected by citizen scientists, and demographic factors leading to the success of data collection by citizen science projects.

== Selected publications ==
- Animal Groups in Three Dimensions: How Species Aggregate. Julia K. Parrish, William M. Hamner. Cambridge: Cambridge University Press. 1997. ISBN 978-0-511-60115-6. OCLC 776964988.
- Parrish, Julia K.; Edelstein-Keshet, Leah (1999-04-02). "Complexity, Pattern, and Evolutionary Trade-Offs in Animal Aggregation". Science. 284 (5411): 99–101. Bibcode:1999Sci...284...99P. doi:10.1126/science.284.5411.99. PMID 10102827.
- Parrish, Julia K.; Viscido, Steven V.; Grünbaum, Daniel (2002-06-01). "Self-Organized Fish Schools: An Examination of Emergent Properties". The Biological Bulletin. 202 (3): 296–305. doi:10.2307/1543482. ISSN 0006-3185. JSTOR 1543482. PMID 12087003. S2CID 377484.
- Bonney, Rick; Shirk, Jennifer L.; Phillips, Tina B.; Wiggins, Andrea; Ballard, Heidi L.; Miller-Rushing, Abraham J.; Parrish, Julia K. (2014-03-28). "Next Steps for Citizen Science". Science. 343 (6178): 1436–1437. Bibcode:2014Sci...343.1436B. doi:10.1126/science.1251554. PMID 24675940. S2CID 206555629.

== Awards and honors ==
- Aldo Leopold Fellow (2006)
- Fellow, Ecological Society of America (2016)
- Fellow, American Association for the Advancement of Science (2019)
- Lifetime Achievement Award, Pacific Seabird Group (2019)
- One of 12 "Champions of Change" honored at The White House (2013)
