= Robert T. Paine (zoologist) =

American zoologist

- Born: April 13, 1933; Cambridge, Massachusetts
- Died: June 13, 2016 (aged 83); Seattle, Washington
- Education: Harvard University; University of Michigan
- Known for: keystone species concept
- Awards: Sewall Wright Award (1996); National Academy of Sciences; International Cosmos Prize (2013)
- Scientific career
- Workplaces: University of Michigan; University of Washington; Harvard University; Scripps Institution of Oceanography
- Thesis: The Life History and Population Dynamics of Glottidia Pyramidata (Brachiopoda) (1961)
- Doctoral students: Paul Dayton; Bruce Menge; Jane Lubchenco; Anne Salomon
- Website: www.biology.washington.edu/users/robert-t-paine

Robert Treat Paine III (April 13, 1933 – June 13, 2016) was an American ecologist who spent most of his career at the University of Washington. Paine coined the keystone species concept to explain the relationship between Pisaster ochraceus, a species of starfish, and Mytilus californianus, a species of mussel.

== Early life and education ==
Paine was born on April 13, 1933, and grew up in Cambridge, Massachusetts. He was fascinated by biology from a very young age. After graduating from Harvard University in 1954, he served in the U.S. Army, where he was the battalion gardener. Paine later entered graduate school at the University of Michigan, intending to study paleontology. Having taken some courses in zoology and ecology at Michigan, his interests and studies changed after taking a course about freshwater invertebrates taught by ecologist Frederick E. Smith. Upon graduating from the University of Michigan, Paine completed a one-year postdoctoral fellowship at the Scripps Institution of Oceanography. In 1962, Paine joined the University of Washington, where he spent the rest of his career and became well known for his work.

== Research career ==
Paine's doctoral research thesis was on the ecology of living brachipods. As a postdoctoral fellow, he worked on the history and energetics of opisthobranchs (marine gastropods). Much of Paine's work at the University of Washington focused on the organization of marine communities. It was here that much of his research on keystone species occurred.

In a noteworthy 1966 paper, Paine described a rocky intertidal ecosystem in Makah Bay in Washington state, where top predator species help maintain biodiversity. This led to his 1969 paper in which he proposed the keystone species concept. This concept states that an ecosystem may experience a dramatic shift if a keystone species is removed, even though that species was a small part of the ecosystem by measures of biomass or productivity. It has become a very popular concept in conservation biology. Paine also coined the term "trophic cascade" to describe the top-down effects that occur in ecosystems when an important species is introduced or removed.

== Retirement and death ==
Paine retired in the late 1990s but continued to be active as a professor emeritus at the University of Washington. In 2000, he founded the Experimental and Field Ecology Fund to support graduate student research; the fund was renamed the Robert T. Paine Experimental & Field Ecology Endowed Fund to mark Paine's 80th birthday. As late as 2013, aged 79, Paine continued to make regular visits to Tatoosh Island for research purposes. (Note: Close to Cape Flattery, "the northwesternmost point of the continental United States", the island is owned by the Makah Indian tribe. They granted him permission to conduct his research, with the only restriction being that he not ‘‘mess with the graves.’’)

In 2013, he was awarded the International Cosmos Prize, including a cash prize equivalent to about US$408,000. Paine died from acute myeloid leukemia, a type of blood cancer, at the Swedish Medical Center in Seattle, Washington, on June 13, 2016.

== Legacy ==
Paine's research—and the subsequent work of his students—has been very influential in the field of ecology, and he has been called a "giant" of the field. Paine's research helped popularise field manipulation experiments, sometimes called "kick-it-and-see ecology", at a time when field ecologists tended only to observe natural ecosystems. Ed Yong wrote that "by encouraging independence and prizing fieldwork, Paine mentored an entire generation of superstar ecologists." Paine's former students and postdocs include Paul Dayton, Bruce Menge and Jane Lubchenco. Paine and his work are featured prominently in the 2018 documentary film The Serengeti Rules.

== Recognition ==
- Vice-President, Ecological Society of America, 1977–1978
- President, Ecological Society of America, 1979–1980
- Robert H. MacArthur Award, Ecological Society of America, 1983
- Elected to The National Academy of Sciences, 1986
- Sewall Wright Award, 1996
- American Society of Naturalists Honorary Lifetime Membership Award, 2009
- Fellow of the Ecological Society of America, 2012
- International Cosmos Prize, 2013
