= Anne Salomon =

Canadian applied marine ecologist

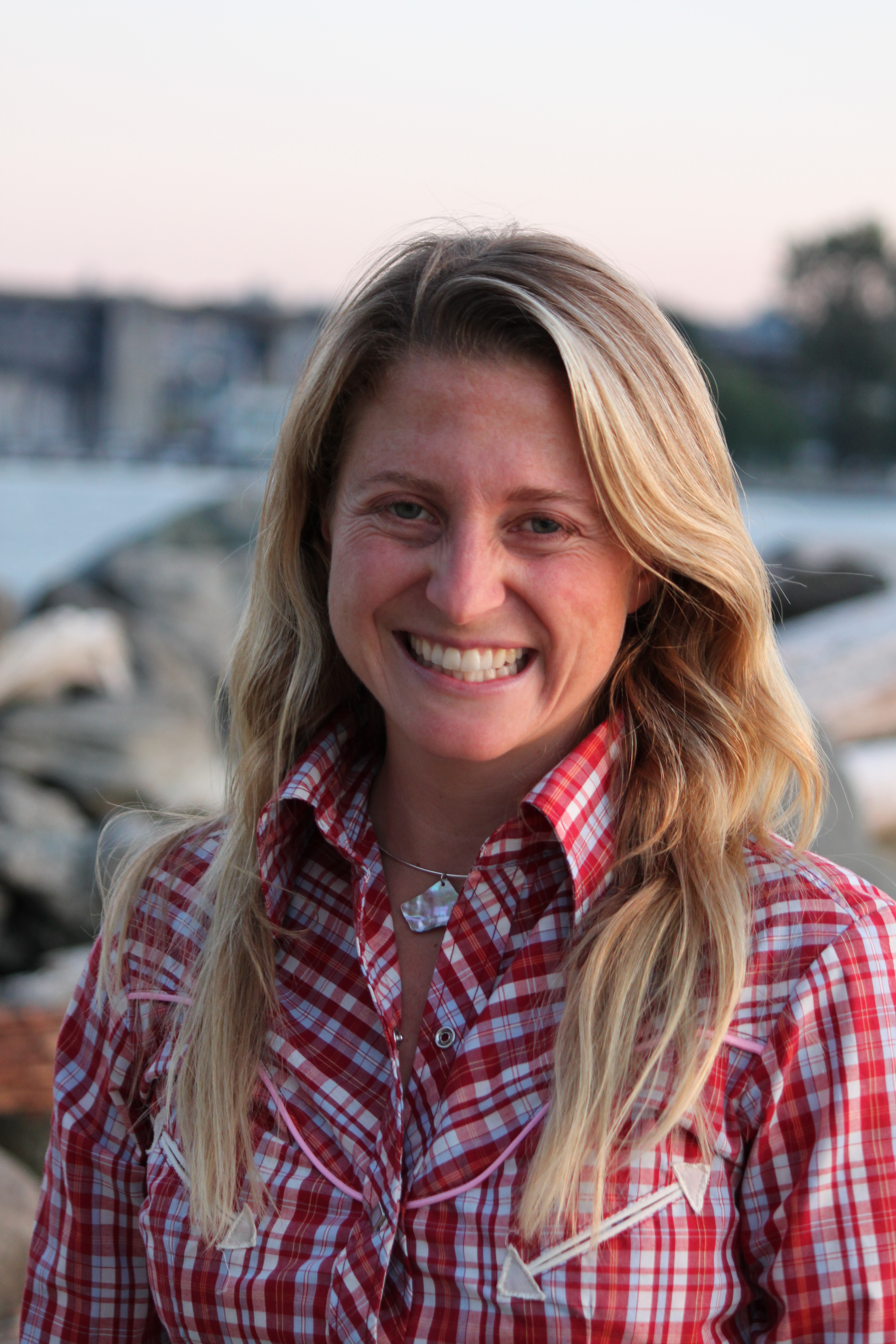
- in 2009
- Born: 1974 (age 51–52); Vancouver, British Columbia, Canada
- Occupation: marine ecologist

Academic background
- Education: BS.c., 1996, Queen's University; MS.c., 2000, University of British Columbia; PhD, Philosophy, 2006, University of Washington
- Thesis: Trophic effects of fishing on temperate coastal food webs and ecosystem dynamics (2006)
- Doctoral advisor: Robert T. Paine

Anne Katherine Salomon (born 1974) is a Canadian applied marine ecologist. She is a professor with the School of Resource and Environmental Management in the Faculty of Environment at Simon Fraser University. In 2019, Salomon was elected a Member of the College of New Scholars, Artists, and Scientists of the Royal Society of Canada.

== Early life ==
Salomon was born in Vancouver, British Columbia. The daughter of a physicist father and occupational-therapist mother. She lived near the University of British Columbia and spent a lot of time at the Jericho Sailing Centre. She started sailing when she was five and credits catching her first fish as her inspiration for studying the ocean.

Growing up, Salomon cited primatologist Jane Goodall as an inspiration. She stated Goodall was "inspiring a generation of women to explore the remote corners of our planet, observe nature and her mysteries and do whatever we can to conserve them." Salomon stated that when she was researching at the Bamfield Marine Sciences Centre, all projects involving Huu-ay-aht lands were brought to the Huu-ay-aht First Nation for approval. This heavily influenced how she conducted her own research.

== Education ==
Salomon earned her PhD from the University of Washington.

== Career ==
After earning her PhD, Salomon did her post-doctoral work at the Marine Science Institute in the University of California Santa Barbara. In 2008, Salomon accepted the David H. Smith Conservation Research Fellowship. Following this, Salomon accepted a position at Simon Fraser University (SFU) as an Assistant Professor of their School of Resource and Environmental Management.

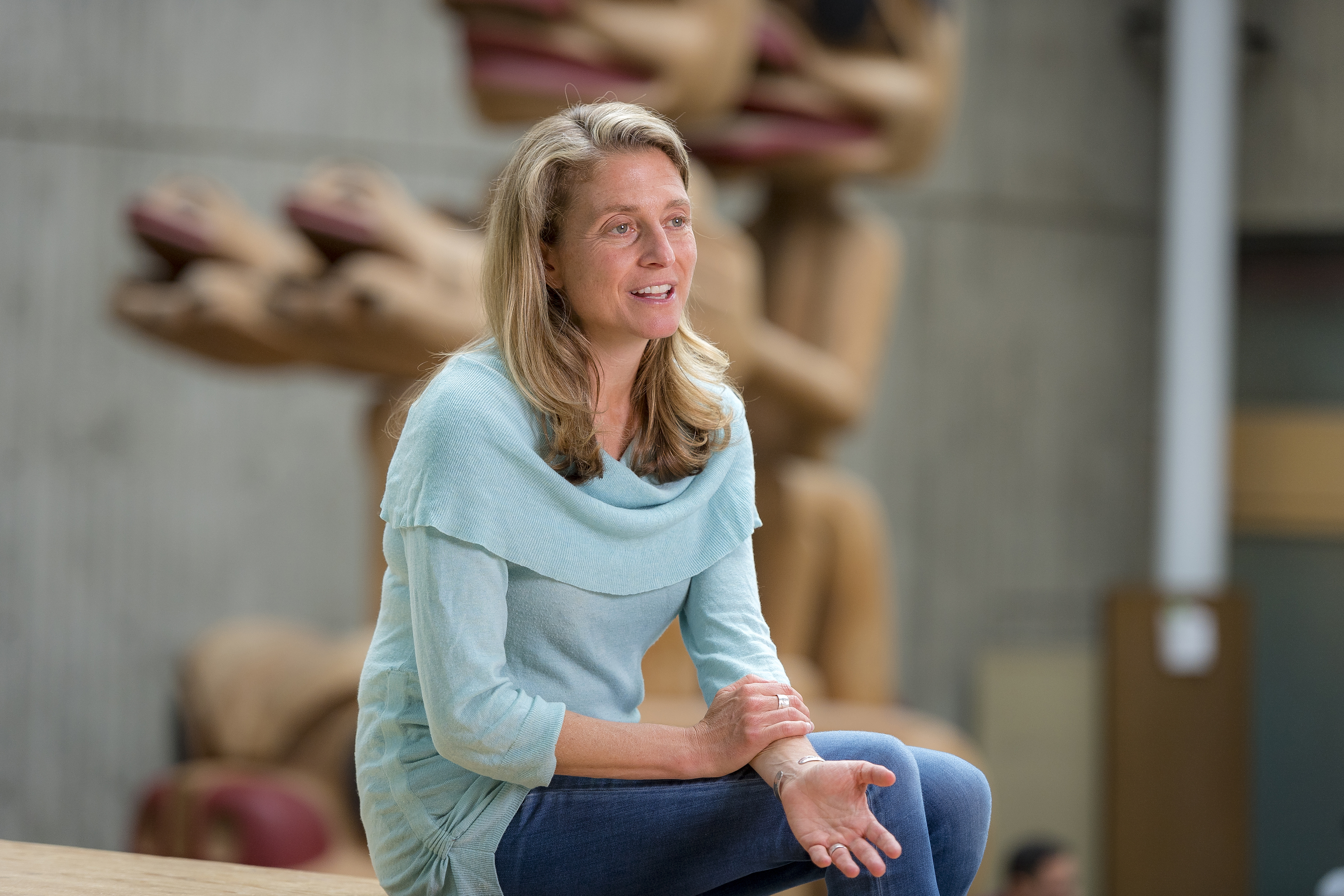
Salomon in 2019

In 2013, Salomon was the recipient of a PEW Fellowship to research sea otter recovery in North America. Her research, which was in collaboration with First Nations groups and the Hakai Beach Institute, synthesized data of sea otter recovery and the impact it had on fisheries. She simultaneously directed SFU's Coastal Marine Ecology and Conservation Lab. That year, she also received the International Recognition of Professional Excellence Prize, which included a $4,000 endowment, by the International Ecology Institute. She also helped launch the "Outer Shores Research Program," which worked alongside the Hakai Beach Institute and Central Coast First Nations to "understand the major drivers of changes and their effects on near shore coastal ecosystems." Her research interests also extended to studying ancient clam gardens in the Pacific Northwest. With fellow researchers Amy Groesbeck, Dana Lepofsky, and Kirsten Rowell, Salomon helped create the first study that proved ancient clam gardens were superior productivity. After that academic term, Salomon was promoted to associate professor.

As an associate professor in 2015, Salomon received the Award for Excellence in Graduate Supervision. This was due to Salomon involving herself in supervising 31 students, in addition to those she supervises informally, within six years. She later earned a grant to study Ecosystem Tipping Points In an Era of Global Change.

In 2019, Salomon was elected a Member of the College of New Scholars, Artists, and Scientists of the Royal Society of Canada.

== Personal life ==
Salomon and her husband have two kids together.
