= Freaky Green Eyes =

Novel by Joyce Carol Oates

- Front cover of the hardcover edition
- Author: Joyce Carol Oates
- Language: English
- Genre: Young adult fiction
- Publisher: HarperCollins
- Publication date: 2003
- Publication place: United States
- Media type: Print (hardcover)
- Pages: 342
- ISBN: 978-1-61556-437-8
- OCLC: 50598191

Freaky Green Eyes (2003) is the third young adult fiction novel written by Joyce Carol Oates. The story follows the life of 15-year-old Francesca "Franky" Pierson as she reflects on the events leading to her mother's mysterious disappearance. Through what she calls Freaky's thoughts, Franky accepts the truth about her mother's disappearance and her father's hand in it.

Oates has said that the O.J Simpson case and the amount of media coverage it received inspired her to write Freaky Green Eyes. The novel's two primary themes, domestic violence and life in the media spotlight, raised questions about social taboo, teen anxiety, and the relationship between silence and truth.

The novel became a critical success. Publishers Weekly named Freaky Green Eyes as one of the "Best Children's Books of 2003".

== Plot ==
The novel opens with Franky explaining how "Freaky" came into her life. It was few weeks after her 14th birthday and she went to a college party near Puget Sound in Washington with some friends from her high school. While there, she met Cameron (a college freshman at the University of South Carolina), who tried to rape her. As a swimmer, Franky used her strong legs to kick Cameron hard enough to get him off her. Afterward, Cameron looked at her and said, "You should see your eyes! Freaky green eyes!"

Franky, now 15, lives in Yarrow Heights (a suburb of Seattle) with her father Reid Pierson, her mother Krista Pierson, her younger sister Samantha, and her half-brother Todd. As a sports reporter, Reid has had a big contract go through with a TV network and wants to celebrate with his family. Krista, however, goes to an arts and crafts convention in Santa Barbara, California instead, which angers Reid. When Krista returns home, Franky starts to notice the tension between her parents, especially after hearing them fight. She hears her mom say she does not want to go to Reid's work gatherings because she feels like she doesn't fit in with his crowd. In turn, Reid gets mad that Krista isn't fulfilling her role as a wife.

Krista starts wearing scarves around her neck and long shirts to cover her wrists and arms, which Franky notices, thinking her mother is hiding something from her. Yet she cannot muster up the courage to ask her about it. Instead, she starts feeling resentful toward her mother, thinking all the fighting was Krista's fault for provoking Reid. Her younger sister, Samantha, worries that their parents will divorce but both say that that won't happen, "now or ever." Krista moves out of the house and into a small cabin in Skagit Harbor. She starts by taking her art supplies, then clothes and her dog, Rabbit. Whenever Reid is home, Krista lives in her cabin. When he leaves to cover sporting events, she comes back home to be with her children. Samantha sometimes calls Krista and begs her to come pick them up so they could all spend time together, but Krista always says no, saying it was their father's decision. Reid, however, is saying the opposite. Samantha's frustration angers Reid so he twists her arm to make her quiet, giving her welts.

"Later, I would think of it as crossing over. From a known territory into an unknown. From a place where people know you to a place where people only think they know you."

— Franky.

For the Fourth of July, Franky and Samantha go with their father to Cape Flattery to stay with one of his friends. While there, Franky learns that Reid's friend's sons steal animals from a wildlife refuge and put them in cages to make their own zoo. In the middle of the night, Franky releases all the animals. When confronted about it the next morning, she confesses but says she's not sorry. Enraged, Reid grabs Franky and shakes her very hard, stopping only after his friend pulls him away.

Later that month, Reid finally lets the girls go down to Skagit Harbor to visit their mother. Franky vaguely remembers the cabin from her childhood, recognizing the fake rooster she had thought was real as a kid. Krista shows them around the property, including a small burrow hidden underneath a rock. The reunion is cut short when Reid arrives, yelling at Franky and Samantha to pack up and get in his car. When they get in, Reid tells them Krista is having an affair and that they should never forgive her for it.

After that, Krista tries to call and talk to her daughters, but Reid tells the new housekeeper to forbid it. Twyla, Franky's best friend, tells Franky that Krista calls her to talk about Franky and see how she is. Twyla tells Franky that Krista said, "Don't forget Mr. Rooster!" One night, Franky phones Krista and angrily tells her she never wants to see her again. The next day, she regrets what she said and tries to find her mother's number but can't find it. She had no idea the conversation the night before would be their last.

Krista (and her friend Mero Okawa) disappear. The police interview Franky about where her father was that night, but Franky says Reid took medication for a headache and slept the entire night. During the interview, she expresses her anger at her mother, referring to her only as "Krista Connor," not "mom." As a result of media attention on the case, Franky and her family move to the house of Reid's defense lawyer on Vashon Island. While there, the defense lawyer coaches Samantha and Franky, telling them that if Reid would have left in the middle of the night, they would have heard him leave.

During this time, "Freaky" tries to convince Franky that something is not right. One night, Franky dreams about her mother's cabin, and in the dream, the fake rooster is crowing. The next morning, Franky skips school and heads towards Skagit Harbor to visit her mother's cabin. She walks toward the barn and looks into the secret burrow, where she finds her mother's journal. Krista had kept it up throughout her separation with Reid. In the journal, Krista writes about how Reid beat and threatened to kill her. After reading the journal, Franky realizes what her father has done. She recalls waking up the night her mother disappeared, hearing Reid coming into the house through a door they never use.

Franky calls her Aunt Vicky to pick her up and they go to the police station. In a second interview, Franky tells the police what she knows, not what she has been coached to say by her father or the defense lawyer. Reid is sentenced to 50 years-to-life without parole for the deaths of Krista and Mero, whose bodies were found dumped at Deception Pass. Franky and Samantha, in the custody of their aunt, move to New Mexico.

=== Main characters ===
Francesca "Franky" Pierson
The 15-year-old narrator and protagonist who keeps a journal to reflect on the time before her mother went missing.
Krista Pierson
Franky and Samantha's mother and Todd's stepmother. Her maiden name is Connor (which is the name she used to sign her artwork). She had been a TV announcer before marrying Reid.
Reid Pierson
Franky, Samantha, and Todd's abusive father. He had been a famous professional football player before becoming a sportscaster for CBS.
Samantha Pierson
Franky's 10-year-old sister.
Todd Pierson
Franky and Samantha's 20-year-old half-brother, who followed in his father's footsteps and plays college football.
Rabbit
Krista's Jack Russell Terrier.
Mero Okawa
Krista's gay friend in Skagit Harbor. Reid thought he was Krista's lover.
Bonnie Lynn Byers
Reid's first wife and Todd's mother. She was killed in a boating accident in which Reid was the only witness. Her case was reopened after Krista's case was concluded.

== Themes ==
=== Effect of tabloid journalism ===
Oates has said that her inspiration for the book was "the O.J. Simpson case without the whole racial angle." The infamous O.J. Simpson case unfolded in 1994 when his ex-wife, Nicole Brown Simpson and her friend, Ronald Goldman were found stabbed to death outside Brown's home. The publicity during this case was greater than for any murder trial seen, due to Simpson's fame as a former professional football player and actor, and the fact of his former interracial marriage to Brown. Evidence was introduced that he had abused his wife. After a nine-month criminal trial, in which the defense attacked the LAPD, which had a history of racism, the jury returned a not-guilty verdict. Years after the trial's conclusion, debates continue about the verdict and the issues.

Oates described what was going on in the Simpson trial as "tabloid hell:" a person cannot go anywhere without someone knowing who they are and what was going on in their life.

In Freaky Green Eyes, Reid Pierson's character has much in common with O.J. Simpson. He's a former pro-football player and a sports broadcaster. As Heather Humann notes in her article, "Domestic Violence, Child Agency, and the Adolescent Perspective in Joyce Carol Oates's Freaky Green Eyes," in the book Reid's personality is portrayed as resembling that of Simpson.

Oates said, "I'm focusing on how a person who is a celebrity is so admired that he casts a kind of aura, that people stare at the aura, and they don't really want to see that the person himself is somewhat stunted." Oates wanted to explore society's views toward celebrities accused of grave crimes. People don't want to believe it because the person is famous. Through her novel, Oates is saying that just because someone (celebrity or not) presents himself or herself as something does not mean it is what they truly are. The novel makes that point when Reid Pierson is accused of being involved in the disappearance of Krista and Mero, and the media makes up stories (or excuses). For example, in the novel the media speculates that Krista and Mero were lovers and decided to run away together.

Oates says that other events, such as the Monica Lewinsky controversy, show how deeply tabloid journalism has infiltrated society, especially when used for political ends, as that case was. She uses the Lewinsky case as an example, saying that even the New York Times's coverage of the scandal was similar to the coverage by tabloids of such stories.

=== The meaning of "Freaky" ===
While Franky is the narrator, there are times when the reader seems to hear from someone else: "Freaky", Franky's alter-ego. Throughout the novel, Franky tries to cope with and understand the whole situation. Most of the time she trusts that her father Reid tells her the truth. That's where Freaky comes in. She tries to make Franky see the truth beyond Reid's lies, even though Franky is reluctant to accept this. For example, when Reid tells Franky that Krista will come back, and Franky wants to believe him, Freaky tells her, "You know your mother is gone. You know she isn't coming back. Freaky knows." Deep down, Franky knows her father had something to do with her mother's disappearance and that Krista was not coming back, but doesn't want to believe it. Freaky was trying to help Franky accept the truth.

Freaky was not only a guide to help Franky seek the truth, but she was also the source of Franky's ethics. During Franky's trip for the Fourth of July, she meets the boys who had been taking animals out of a wildlife refuge and placing them in cages on their property. They were under-feeding the animals and treating them poorly, so Franky releases them, saying it was out of a "Freaky Green Eyes rush". Oates has said Freaky was born out of her own inability to do things she wanted to do.

Freaky stopped Franky from being so naive and boosted her confidence in herself and her opinions. Without Freaky, Franky would not have been able to help solve the mystery about her mother. She wouldn't have been able to do the right thing.

== Reception ==
Freaky Green Eyes received positive reviews. ALA Booklist called it a, "fast-paced, first-person thriller." The Boston Herald named it as one of 2003's "most compelling fiction". Publishers Weekly gave Freaky Green Eyes a starred review saying that, "Oates builds the mounting tension masterfully, crafting a fast-paced narrative that will haunt readers long after the final page."

== Publication history ==
This is the book cover of the paperback version.

- Oates, Joyce Carol. Freaky Green Eyes. New York: HarperTempest, 2003. Oclc 181100387
- Oates, Joyce Carol. Freaky Green Eyes. New York: HarperTempest, 2003. Oclc 50598191
- Oates, Joyce Carol, and Stina Nielsen. Freaky Green Eyes. Prince Frederick, MD: Recorded Books, Inc, 2004. Oclc 55377460
- Oates, Joyce Carol, and Stina Nielsen. Freaky Green Eyes. Prince Frederick, Md: Recorded Books, 2004. Oclc 56081594
- Oates, Joyce Carol, and Stina Nielsen. Freaky Green Eyes.Prince Frederick, Md: Recorded Books, 2004. Oclc 56479447
- Oates, Joyce Carol, and Stina Nielsen. Freaky Green Eyes. Prince Frederick, Md: Recorded Books, 2004. Oclc 56596419
- Oates, Joyce Carol, and Stina Nielsen. Freaky Green Eyes. Prince Frederick, Md: Recorded Books, 2004. Oclc 56604722
- Oates, Joyce Carol. Freaky Green Eyes. London: HarperCollins Children's Books, 2004. Oclc 58831346
- Oates, Joyce Carol. Freaky Green Eyes . London: Collins, 2004. Oclc 56645948
- Oates, Joyce Carol. Freaky Green Eyes. London: HarperCollins Children's Books, 2004. Oclc 475267044
- Oates, Joyce Carol, and Stina Nielsen. Freaky Green Eyes. Prince Frederick, MD: Recorded Books, 2004. Oclc 55154644
- Oates, Joyce Carol. Freaky Green Eyes. New York: HarperTempest, 2005. Oclc 57723099
- Oates, Joyce Carol. Freaky Green Eyes [Hauptbd.]. Braunschweig: Diesterweg, 2008. Oclc 426146741

== Similar books from Oates ==
Other novels by Joyce Carol Oates with similar themes and/or protagonists:

- Solstice
- You Must Remember This
- Marya: A Life
- My Sister, My Love
