= Tatoosh Island, Washington =

Island in Washington

Tatoosh
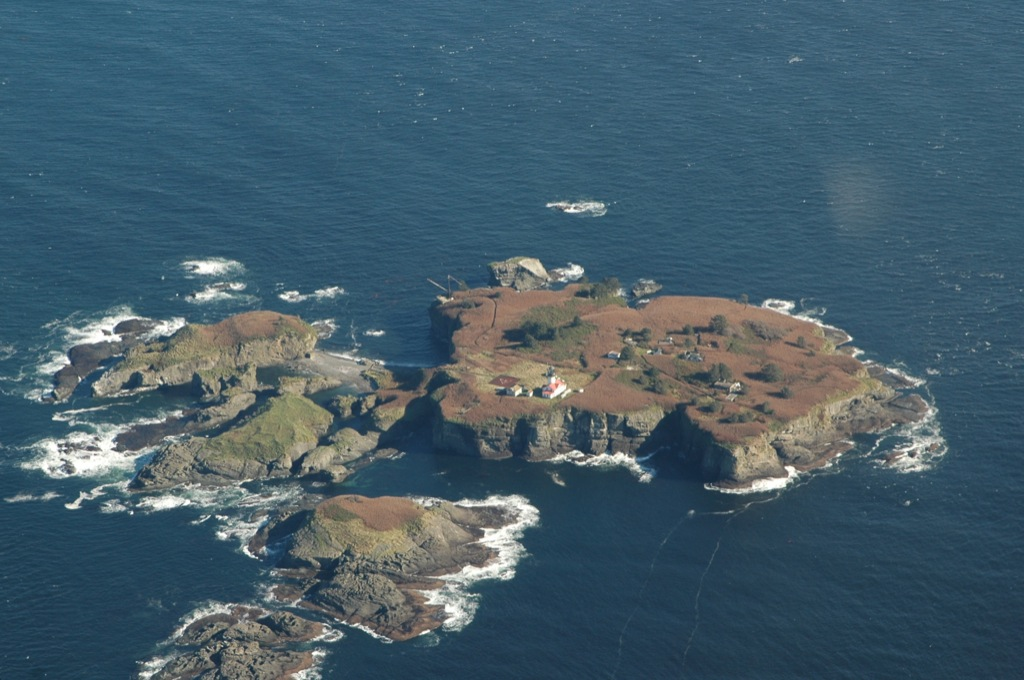
- Interactive map of Tatoosh

Geography
- Location: Makah Reservation, Clallam County, Washington, United States
- Coordinates: 48°23′31″N 124°44′10″W
- State: Washington
- County: Clallam County

Additional information
- Tatoosh Island
- U.S. National Register of Historic Places
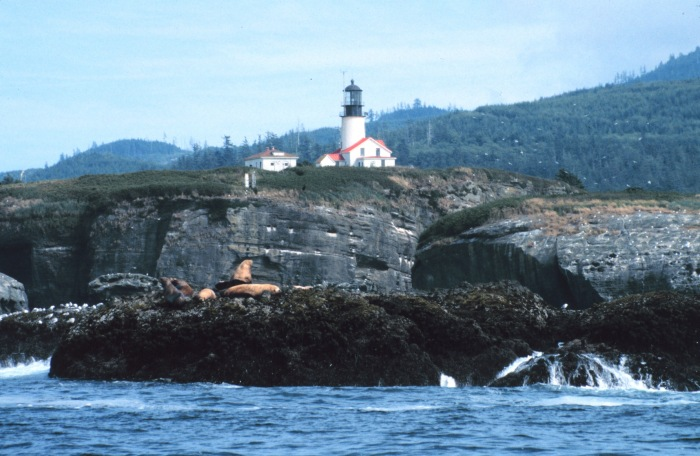
- Cape Flattery Light from offshore

- Location within Washington (state)
- Location: Off Cape Flattery, on Olympic Peninsula, Washington
- Area: 17 acres (6.9 ha)
- Built: 1857
- Architect: US Coast Guard
- NRHP reference No.: 72001267
- Added to NRHP: March 16, 1972

Tatoosh Island is a small island and small group of islands about 0.5 miles (0.8 km) offshore (northwest) of Cape Flattery, which is on the northwestern tip of the Olympic Peninsula in Washington. Tatoosh is the largest of a small group of islands also often referred to as simply "Tatoosh Island", which are almost as far west as Cape Alava, which is about 15 miles (24 km) to the south and the westernmost point in the contiguous 48 states. The islands are part of the Makah Reservation and a part of Clallam County. The total land area of the island group is 159,807 square metres (1,720,150 square feet).

== History ==
Historically, Tatoosh Island was inhabited seasonally by Makah fishing camps and employees of the United States Coast Guard, Weather Bureau, and Navy. Currently, there is no resident population on the islands. Access to the island requires written permission of the Makah tribe. The island's name comes from a Makah chief known as Tatoosh (also Tatooche or Tetacus).

Tatoosh Island has been home to Cape Flattery Light, which overlooks the entrance to the Strait of Juan de Fuca, since December 28, 1857.

The whole island was added to the National Register of Historic Places in 1972.

== Ecology ==
Because of its isolation, climate, and location in the ecologically productive northeastern Pacific Ocean, Tatoosh Island is home to many nesting seabirds, several marine mammals, and a diverse community of marine plants and animals. Beginning in 1967, Professor Robert T. Paine of the University of Washington and his colleagues have undertaken detailed studies of marine ecology on the island. In 1990, Julia Parrish came to the island after an invitation from one of Paine's students and began a long-term research study of sea birds on the island.

The research has revealed how species are linked to each other through a network of species interactions, and how environmental changes and species extinction are transmitted through the food web. Key ecological concepts explored by this research include keystone species, control by consumers and natural disturbances on ecosystem structure and spatial patterning, species interaction strength, body size-dependent population dynamics, and impacts of environmental changes such as ocean acidification and El Niño events on complex ecosystems.

=== Climate ===
Tatoosh Island has an extremely moderated oceanic climate (Köppen Cfb) with very cool but quite long summers, and long, moderate and wet winters. The climate is much more similar to northern Scotland or Haida Gwaii than western Washington. This is due to its exposed location for maritime winds that temper both heat and cold extremes year-round and eliminate dry summers typical of the western/west-southwestern coast of North America. Because of its exposed northwestern location compared to the rest of the state, it is in hardiness zone 9b (25.0 to 30.0 °F (−3.9 to −1.1 °C) mean minimum temp.) as opposed to between 7b and 9a for most of the rest of western Washington.

Climate data for Tatoosh, Washington
Month	Jan	Feb	Mar	Apr	May	Jun	Jul	Aug	Sep	Oct	Nov	Dec	Year
Record high °F (°C)	64 (18)	64 (18)	67 (19)	75 (24)	81 (27)	82 (28)	80 (27)	78 (26)	80 (27)	77 (25)	68 (20)	61 (16)	82 (28)
Mean daily maximum °F (°C)	45.3 (7.4)	46.8 (8.2)	48.0 (8.9)	51.5 (10.8)	55.0 (12.8)	57.7 (14.3)	59.5 (15.3)	59.8 (15.4)	59.1 (15.1)	55.8 (13.2)	50.7 (10.4)	47.5 (8.6)	53.1 (11.7)
Daily mean °F (°C)	42.0 (5.6)	43.2 (6.2)	44.1 (6.7)	47.3 (8.5)	50.8 (10.4)	53.7 (12.1)	55.5 (13.1)	55.8 (13.2)	54.7 (12.6)	51.9 (11.1)	47.2 (8.4)	44.2 (6.8)	49.2 (9.6)
Mean daily minimum °F (°C)	38.7 (3.7)	39.6 (4.2)	40.2 (4.6)	43.2 (6.2)	46.7 (8.2)	49.8 (9.9)	51.5 (10.8)	51.8 (11.0)	50.3 (10.2)	48.0 (8.9)	43.6 (6.4)	40.9 (4.9)	45.4 (7.4)
Record low °F (°C)	14 (−10)	20 (−7)	25 (−4)	33 (1)	37 (3)	43 (6)	45 (7)	45 (7)	43 (6)	33 (1)	19 (−7)	14 (−10)	14 (−10)
Average precipitation inches (mm)	10.58 (269)	8.91 (226)	8.12 (206)	5.28 (134)	2.96 (75)	2.71 (69)	2.29 (58)	2.06 (52)	3.49 (89)	8.34 (212)	10.69 (272)	12.15 (309)	77.55 (1,970)
Average snowfall inches (cm)	3.5 (8.9)	1.6 (4.1)	1.7 (4.3)	0 (0)	0 (0)	0 (0)	0 (0)	0 (0)	0 (0)	0 (0)	0.4 (1.0)	1.6 (4.1)	8.8 (22)
Average precipitation days (≥ 0.01 in)	22	19	20	17	13	13	11	12	11	17	21	24	199
Source: WRCC (normals 1931-1966)

== Gallery ==
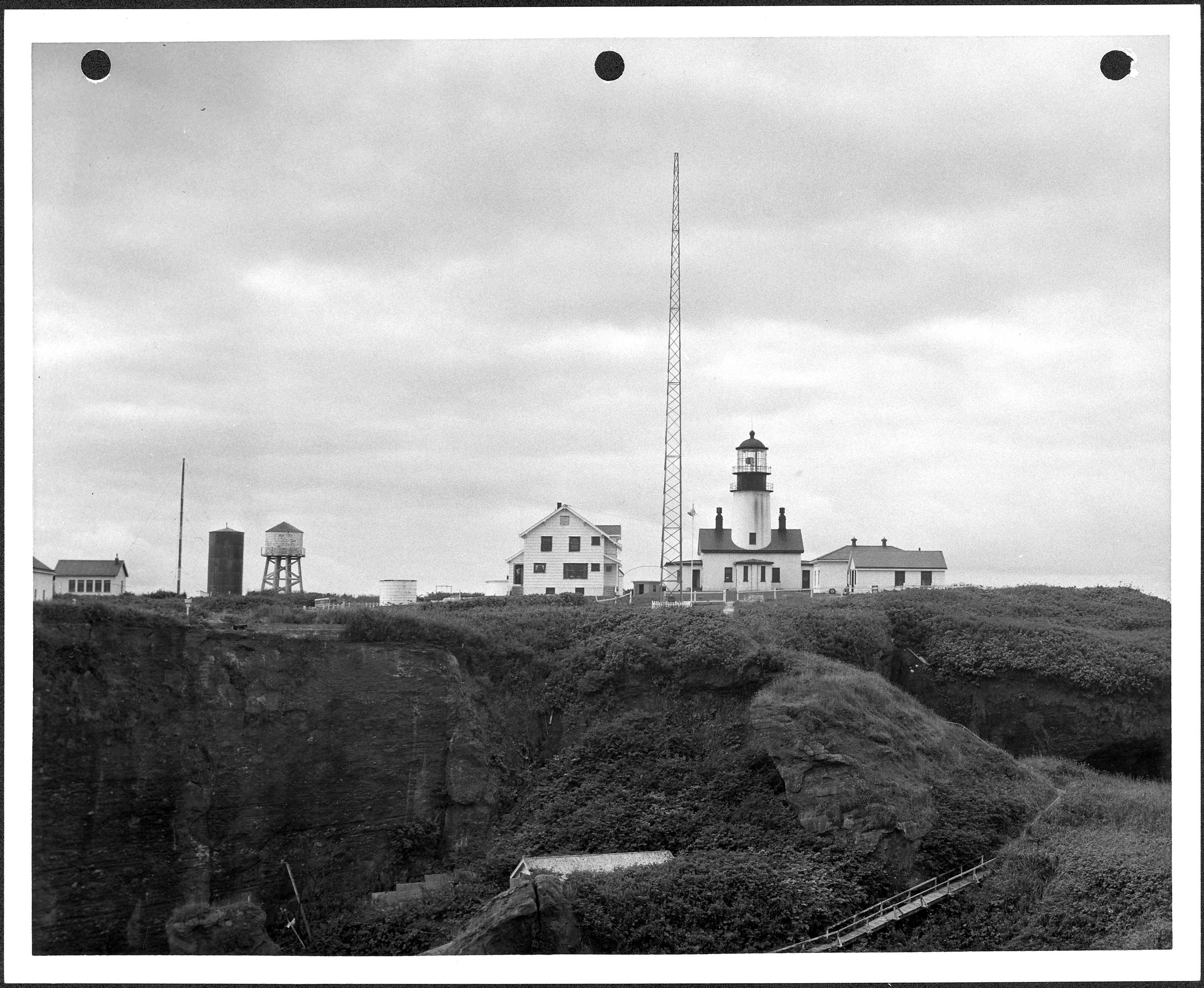
Cape Flattery Lightstation, circa 1943 - 1953

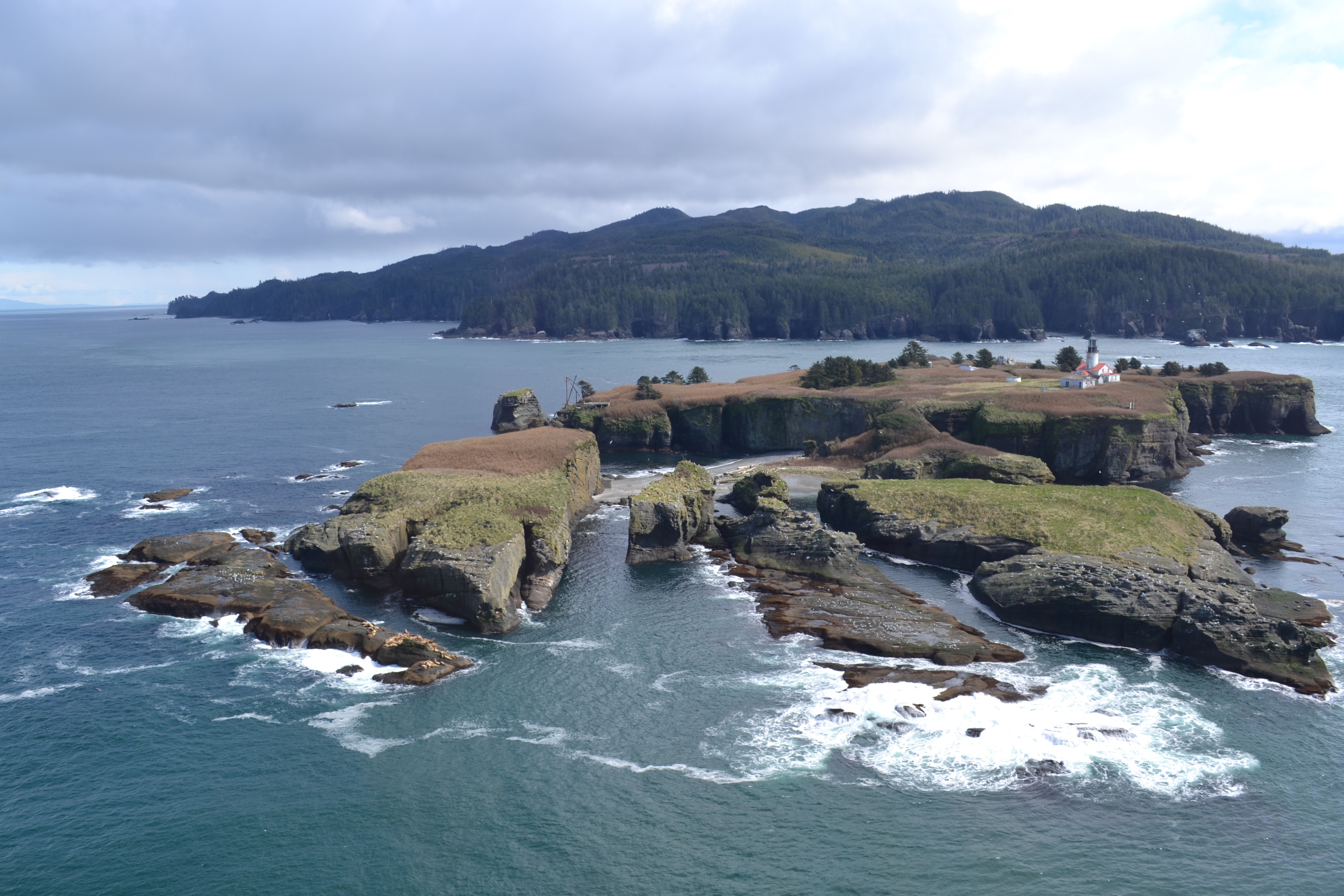
Tatoosh Island seen from the air looking SE to Cape Flattery
