= Coastal Observation and Seabird Survey Team =

Marine ecosystem citizen science project

COASST citizen science volunteers identifying a seabird carcass in Ocean Shores, Washington

Coastal Observation and Seabird Survey Team (COASST) is a citizen science project of the University of Washington, Seattle, Washington, US, with a goal of monitoring marine ecosystem health with the support of citizens within coastal communities. With the help of hundreds of volunteers, COASST assesses beach conditions and identifies and tracks any carcasses of dead seabirds found. Data on the carcass of a seabird contributes to the creation of a baseline record for the death rates of various species of seabirds, including which beaches birds are found at and in what density. Any irregularities can be identified and evaluated, so the cause of any increased mortality can be identified. COASST works with state, tribal, and federal agencies, environmental organizations, and community groups to help achieve their goals of monitoring and successfully establishing marine conservation solutions.

== History ==
A common murre carcass found along the high wrack being prepared for photographic identification by COASST volunteers. Location: Ocean Shores, Washington

COASST was founded in 1998 by Julia Parrish with the goal of expanding long-term data collection on seabirds, including baseline data for discovering patterns of seabird mortality, natural or human-induced, through the program. Due to the increasing human use of coastal waters, Parish envisioned a program that could provide data on both resident and migrant species of birds; mortality rates after oil spills; levels of chronic oiling, information regarding some incidents of entanglement with fishing gear; and causes of death for seabird populations. Since a live bird monitoring program would be difficult, Parish opted to monitor carcasses from beached birds, which could be tracked and identified by anyone.

In July 1998, Parrish obtained a grant from the David and Lucile Packard Foundation to fund her vision of creating a seabird monitoring program that would generate baseline data to help assess patterns of seabird mortality due to natural and human-induced events. The first director of the program, Todd Hass, co-developed COASST with Parrish. Ten years later, COASST has expanded from monitoring five beaches along the outer coast of Washington state, to almost 300 beaches spread across northern California, Oregon, Washington, and Alaska. As of 2018, COASST has more than 1000 participants, which makes COASST the largest beached bird monitoring network in the world today.

== Project recognition ==
The observations of COASST volunteers on jellyfish have been published in both the scientific literature and the popular press. Stories about COASST observations have presented the stories of citizen scientists, common murre die-offs, Cassin's auklets, and puffins In 2013, the White House honored Parrish for her work in establishing and leading the COASST program.
