= Cape Flattery Light =

Lighthouse in Washington, U.S.

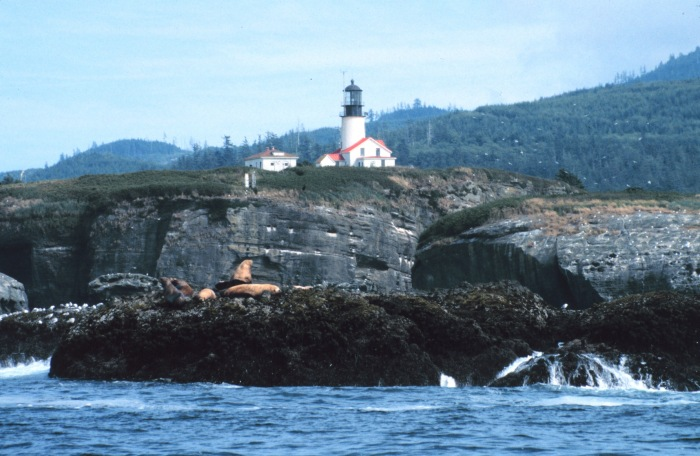
- Location: Neah Bay, Washington
- Coordinates: 48.3917°N 124.7366°W

Tower
- Constructed: 1854
- Foundation: Surface
- Construction: Sandstone/brick
- Automated: 1977
- Height: 65 feet (20 m)
- Shape: Conical
- Markings: White with black lantern and red roof
- Heritage: National Treasure

Light
- First lit: 1857
- Deactivated: 2008
- Focal height: 165 feet (50 m)
- Lens: First order Fresnel lens (removed), VRB-25 (on skeletal structure)
- Characteristic: Two white flashes every 20 s

The Cape Flattery Light is a historic lighthouse structure located at the entrance to the Strait of Juan de Fuca near Neah Bay, Clallam County, in the U.S. state of Washington, within the Makah Indian Reservation.

The deactivated lighthouse sits on Tatoosh Island, which is named after Chief Tatooche of the Makah Tribe. It is the northwesternmost lighthouse on the West Coast of the contiguous United States. Although closed to the public, it can be viewed from Cape Flattery via a short 30-minute walk.

== History ==
The lighthouse was built in 1854 based on the design by Ammi B. Young. Its first light was displayed from a first-order lens in 1857 and was Washington Territory's third lighthouse. The house with a 65-foot (20 m) tower from the center still stands; the tower's light stands 165 feet (50 m) above water. A fog signal building with a 12-inch (300 mm) steam whistle was built on the island in 1872. The original first-order lens was replaced by a fourth-order lens in 1932, then with a modern optic lens in 1977.

The lighthouse's light was decommissioned after a 30-foot (9.1 m) skeletal structure with a solar-powered beacon fitted with six-year solar pack batteries was built on the island in 2008. In 2009, the Coast Guard began cleanup operations in anticipation of handing the historic lighthouse to the Makah tribe, who own Tatoosh Island. After the transfer, the Coast Guard will continue to have access for purposes of maintaining the optic.

On Friday, September 25, 2017 Cape Flattery Lighthouse was announced as the National Trust for Historic Preservation’s newest National Treasure.

As part of the continuing work with the USCG, the National Trust hired Cardinal Architecture and SSF to assess the structural integrity of the fog signal building and lighthouse. Emergency repairs were recommended to prevent further collapse, and an extensive list of structural repairs were recommended to fully repair and restore the structures.

There is currently no funding available for the USCG to undertake the repairs however.
