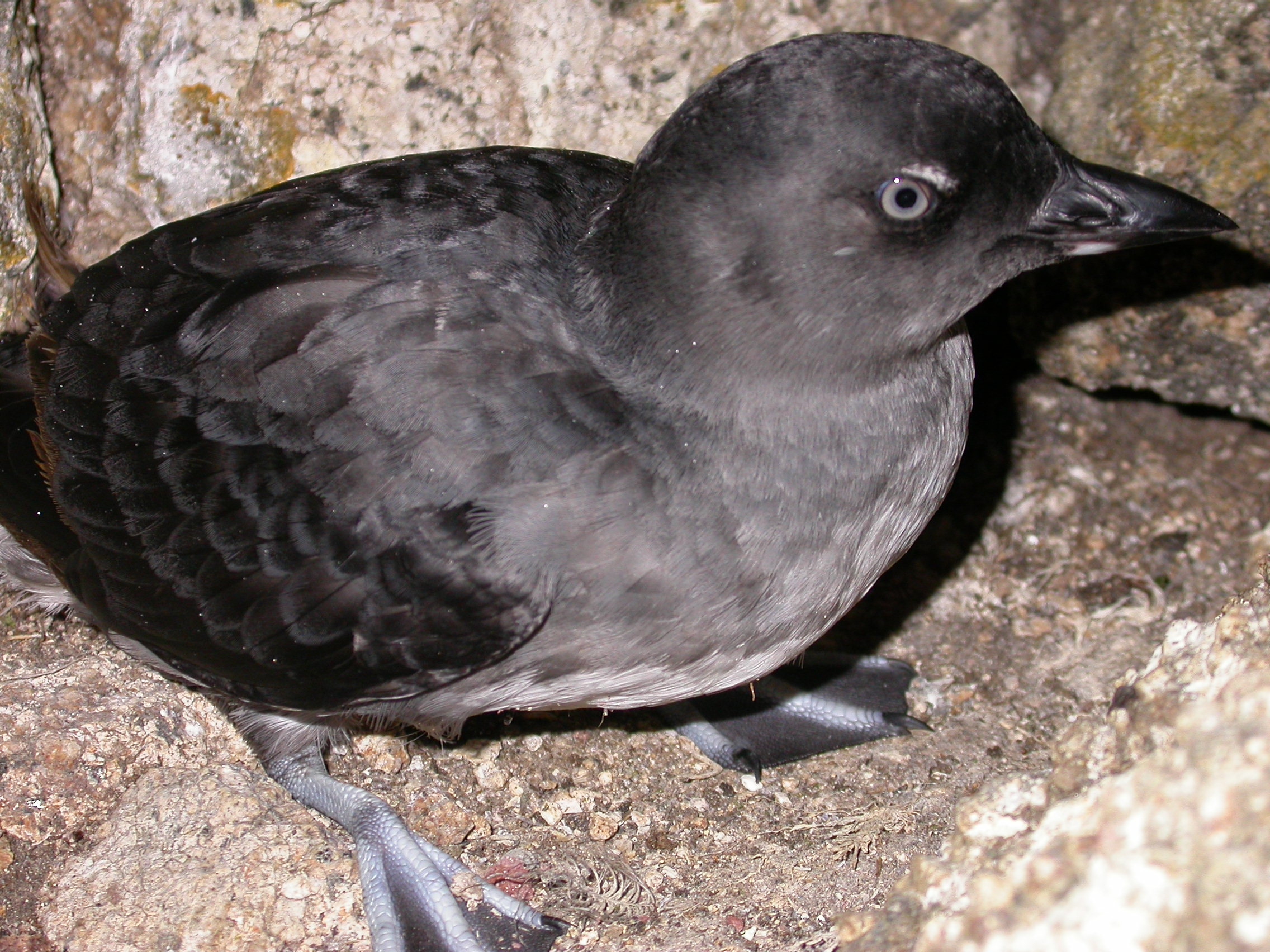

Conservation status
- Near Threatened (IUCN 3.1)

Scientific classification
- Kingdom: Animalia
- Phylum: Chordata
- Class: Aves
- Order: Charadriiformes
- Family: Alcidae
- Genus: Ptychoramphus; Brandt, JF, 1837
- Species: P. aleuticus

Binomial name
- Ptychoramphus aleuticus (Pallas, 1811)

= Cassin's auklet =

Species of bird

Cassin's auklet (Ptychoramphus aleuticus) is a small, chunky seabird that ranges widely in the North Pacific. It is the only species placed in the genus Ptychoramphus. It nests in small burrows and because of its presence on well studied islands in British Columbia and off California it is one of the better known auks. It is named for the American ornithologist John Cassin.

Cassin's auklet is a small (25 cm, 200 g) nondescript auk. Its plumage is generally dark above and pale below, with a small white mark above the eye. Its bill is overall dark with a pale spot, and its feet are blue. Unlike many other auks, Cassin's auklet lacks dramatic breeding plumage, remaining the same over most of the year. At sea it is usually identified by its flight, which is described as looking like a flying tennis ball.

Cassin's auklet ranges from midway up the Baja California peninsula to Alaska's Aleutian Islands, off North America. It nests on offshore islands, with the main population stronghold being Triangle Island off Vancouver Island's Cape Scott, where the population is estimated to be around 55,0000 pairs. It is not known to be migratory. However, northern birds may move farther south during the winter.

Two subspecies are recognised:

- P. a. aleuticus – (Pallas, 1811): Aleutian Islands & south Alaska to northern Baja California.Kurile Islands.
- P. a. australis – van Rossem, 1939: southern Baja California.

An extinct relative or predecessor species, Ptychoramphus tenuis L. H. Miller et Bowman, 1958, is known from the Late Pliocene of the San Diego Formation in California.

== Behaviour ==
Cassin's auklet nests in burrows on small islands, and in the southern area of its range may be found in the breeding colony year round. It either digs holes in the soil or uses natural cracks and crevices to nest in, also readily using man-made structures. Pairs will show a strong loyalty towards each other and to a nesting site for many years. Both the parents incubate the single white egg, returning to swap shifts at night (usually after 2300 h) to avoid being taken by predators such as the western gull or peregrine falcon. They also depart from the colony before dawn. The egg is incubated for 40 days, the small chick is then fed nightly for 35 days by both parents, who regurgitate partially digested food (euphausiids and other small crustaceans) carried in a special gular pouch, often referred to in the literature as a sublingual pouch. The chick fledges alone and makes its way to the sea. Cassin's auklet is unusual amongst seabirds in occasionally laying a second clutch after a successful first clutch (it is the only northern hemisphere seabird to do so).

Most individuals in a cohort begin breeding at age 3 (27%), and by 8 years >95% of a given cohort has recruited. Mean age of recruitment is 3.6 years. Minimum annual breeding propensity is 0.83, apparent local survival is 0.76, juvenile survival (ages 0 to 2) is 0.15.

At sea Cassin's auklets feeds offshore, in clear often pelagic water, often associating with bathymetric landmarks such as underwater canyons and upwellings. Numbers at sea may be grossly underestimated because the bird moves away from ships at a distance of more than a kilometer. Recently their distribution around Triangle Island has been determined by telemetry. It feeds by diving underwater beating its wings for propulsion, hunting down large zooplankton, especially krill. It can dive to 30 m below the surface, and by some estimates 80 m.

== Conservation ==
Cassin's auklet is listed as Near Threatened, and some populations (principally the Farallon Islands population) have suffered steep declines. Threats to the auklet include introduced carnivores (particularly in Alaska), oil spills and changes in sea surface temperature (caused by El Niño events). Cassin's auklet is protected under the Migratory Bird Treaty Act of 1918. Annual variation in ocean climate synchronously affects multiple demographic parameters including survival, breeding propensity, breeding success, and recruitment, a situation conducive to rapid population declines due to climate change.

=== 2014 summer mass death in US ===
In the last few months of 2014, the carcasses of thousands of Cassin's auklets washed ashore from Northern California up to the north coast of Washington State. The Coastal Observation and Seabird Survey Team estimated a toll between 50,000 and 100,000 deaths that year. Scientists were uncertain about the cause of these deaths. While viruses, bacteria, and oil spills were ruled out the cause appeared to be starvation. Scientists found little evidence of food in the stomachs of the carcasses. Some scientists from the California's Farallon Institute believe these mass deaths could be related to the unusual North Pacific warmth which is pushing marine food chains and could affect other species of zooplankton, krill and fish that normally develop in cold waters and the birds that consume them including Cassin's auklets. The event happened in the late summer when the auklet chicks began to fledge.
