= Paul K. Dayton =

American oceanographer

Paul Kuykendall Dayton (born April 8, 1941 in Tucson, Arizona) is a biological oceanographer and marine ecologist at the Scripps Institution of Oceanography. Dayton works in benthic ecology, marine conservation, evolution, natural history, and general ecology.

During a 35-year career at Scripps, Dayton has researched coastal Antarctic habitats and the rocky shore habitats of Washington in order to better understand marine ecosystems. He has also documented the environmental impacts of overfishing, and phenomena such as El Niño on coastal ecology.

Dayton is the only person to win both the George Mercer Award (1974) and the WS Cooper Award (2000) from the Ecological Society of America. In 2002, he received the Scientific Diving Lifetime Achievement Award from the American Academy of Underwater Sciences; in 2004 he was honored with the Edward O. Wilson Naturalist Award from the American Society of Naturalists, and in 2006 was the first recipient of the Ramon Margalef Prize in Ecology. Dayton has been director of The Ocean Conservancy and the National Research Council Panel on Marine Protected Areas. He has been a frequent contributor to Science magazine.

Dayton's 1971 paper titled "Competition, disturbance and community organization: The provision and subsequent utilization of space in a rocky intertidal community" in Ecological Monographs has been cited over 1800 times as of April 2012.

== Education ==
Dayton received a Bachelor of Science from the University of Arizona, Tucson, in 1963. He then earned a doctorate in zoology at the University of Washington under Robert T. Paine, known for the Keystone species concept.
