= Bruce A. Menge =

- Born: Minneapolis, Minnesota, U.S.
- Occupations: Ocean ecologist; professor
- Title: Wayne and Gladys Valley Professor of Marine Biology

Academic background
- Education: University of Minnesota (B.A.); University of Washington (Ph.D.)
- Doctoral advisor: Robert T. Paine

Bruce A. Menge is an American ocean ecologist. He has spent over forty years studying the processes that drive the dynamics of natural communities. His fields of interest include: structure and dynamics of marine meta-ecosystems, responses of coastal ecosystems to climate change, linking benthic and inner shelf pelagic communities, the relationship between scale and ecosystem dynamics, bottom-up and top-down control of community structure, recruitment dynamics, ecophysiology and sub-organismal mechanisms in environmental stress models, larval transport and connectivity, impact of ocean acidification on marine ecosystems, controls of productivity, population, community, and geographical ecology. He settled on two career goals: carrying out experiment-based field research to investigate the dynamics of rocky intertidal communities, focusing on species interactions and environmental context and how this might shape a community, and using the resulting data to test and modify theories on how communities were organized.

== Early life and education ==
Menge was born in Minneapolis, Minnesota, and grew up mostly in Eden Prairie, Minnesota. He received a Bachelor of Arts degree from the University of Minnesota, 1961–1965. He then received his PhD from the Department of Zoology, University of Washington, 1965–1970, working under guidance of Robert T. Paine. Menge met Jane Lubchenco, and they were married in 1971. Menge worked on his Postdoc between 1970–1971 at the University of California at Santa Barbara with Joe Connell and Bill Murdoch. Menge then accepted a position as Assistant Professor at the University of Massachusetts Boston in August 1971, where he remained until 1976. Menge then moved to Oregon and took a job at Oregon State University (OSU) in September 1976, where he has worked as an assistant, associate, and full professor.

== Research ==
The research that Menge has been interested in includes: marine ecology, community ecology, ecosystem and meta-ecosystem ecology; physiological ecology; geographical ecology; impacts of climate change and ocean acidification on coastal ecosystems. Menge has researched the dynamics of ecological communities in biologically diverse marine environments. His visiting professorships have taken him to Guam, Sweden, Quebec, Chile, Jamaica, New Zealand and Panama, where he has been an associate at the Smithsonian Tropical Research Institute since 1978.

== Involvements ==
Menge serves on the board of directors of the Friday Harbor Laboratories, the West Quoddy Biological Research Station, the Organization for Tropical Studies, and the Sustainable Ecosystems Institute. He has been a reviewer for the Journal of Marine Research since 1989. Menge is also a member of the American Society of Naturalists, the Society for the Study of Evolution, the Ecological Society of America, the American Society of Limnology and Oceanography and the Nordic Ecological Society. He has authored 121 papers published or in press.

== Current work ==
Menge and his wife, both faculty members at Oregon State University, split a single professorship into two half-time positions. Each holds an endowed title as Wayne and Gladys Valley Professor of Marine Biology. For the next five years, they will focus their expertise on a $17.7 million research project to study the ecology and conservation of coastal Pacific Ocean marine life. Over the next five years, the research goals of PISCO are to understand the impacts of climate change on large marine ecosystems, to further the theory and application of marine reserves, and to help inform the sustainable management of marine resources.

== Awards and honors ==
Menge received an honorary Doctor of Science degree during commencement ceremonies on Sunday, May 23 at Southampton College of Long Island University. Menge was appointed Wayne and Gladys Valley Endowed Professor of Marine Biology. He was awarded OSU Distinguished Professor of Zoology. He has won OSU's F.A. Gilfillan Memorial Award for Excellence in Research, the George Mercer Award from the Ecological Society of America, and fellowships from the American Association for the Advancement of Science, the Ecological Society of America and the John Simon Guggenheim Foundation.

== Publications ==
- 2011e. Barshis, D. J., E. E. Sotka, R. P. Kelly, A. Sivasundar, B. A. Menge, J. A. Barth, and S. R. Palumbi. Coastal upwelling and sweepstakes recruitment in the acorn barnacle Balanus glandula. Marine Ecology Progress Series (in press).
- 2011f. Menge, B. A. Northern California Current. Pp. xxx-xxx in Encyclopedia for Climate and Weather, Second Edition. S. Schneider, editor in chief. Oxford University Press, Oxford, UK. (in press).
- 2011g. Menge, B. A., T. L. Freidenburg and A. Iles. Keystone species. Encyclopedia of Biodiversity, 2nd Edition. S. A. Levin, editor-in-chief. Academic Press, New York, NY. (in press)
- 2011h. Gouhier, T. C., B. A. Menge, and S. D. Hacker. Recruitment facilitation can promote coexistence and buffer population growth in metacommunities. Ecology Letters (in press).
- 2011i. Place, S. P., B. A. Menge, and G. E. Hofmann. Transcriptome profiling of environmental and physiological linkages in complex ecosystems. Functional Ecology (in press).
- 2012a. Menge, B. A. and E. Sanford. Ecological role of sea stars from populations to meta-ecosystems. Ch. 7 in J. M. Lawrence, ed. Asteroidea: Biology and Ecology of Starfish. Johns Hopkins University Press, Baltimore, MD. (in press).
- 2012b. Menge, B. A. A journey towards rocky intertidal meta-ecosystem ecology. (in press). Invited essay in, C. Hurd, P. J. Harrison, C. S. Lobban and K. Bischoff, Seaweed Ecology and Physiology, 2nd edition. Cambridge University Press, Cambridge, UK.
