= Cape Flattery =

Headland in Washington state, United States

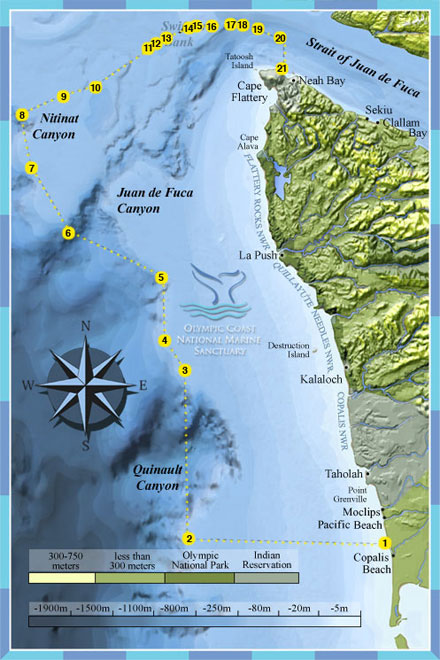
Map of the Olympic Coast National Marine Sanctuary, showing Cape Flattery at the northwestern tip of Washington state

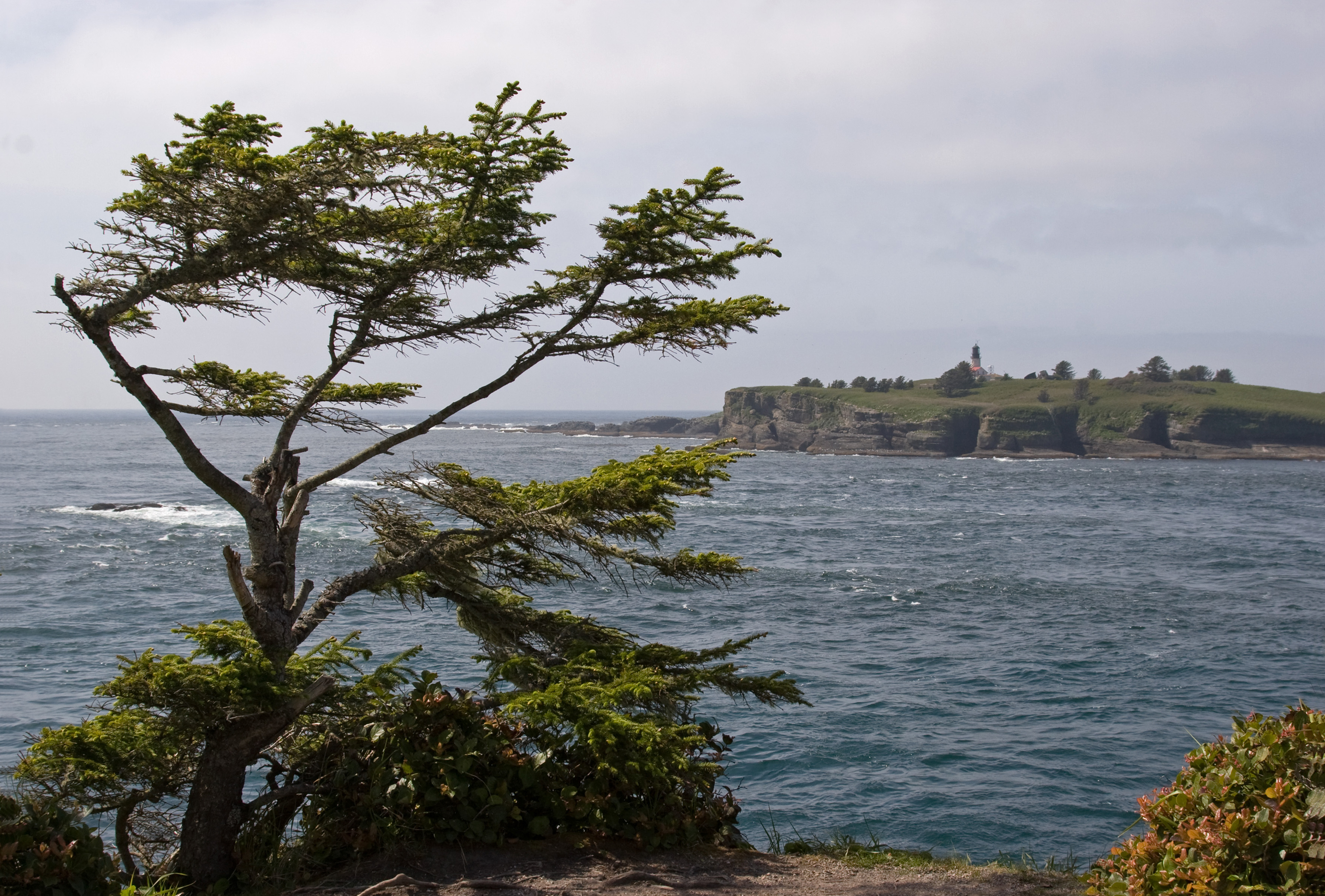
Tatoosh Island and Cape Flattery Light from Cape Flattery, with Sitka spruce in foreground

Cape Flattery (48°23′09″N 124°43′37″W) is the northwesternmost point of the contiguous United States. It is in Clallam County, Washington, on the Olympic Peninsula, where the Strait of Juan de Fuca joins the Pacific Ocean. It is also part of the Makah Reservation, and is the northern boundary of the Olympic Coast National Marine Sanctuary. Cape Flattery can be reached from a short hike, most of which is boardwalked. The westernmost point in the contiguous United States is at Cape Alava, south of Cape Flattery in Olympic National Park. However, the westernmost tip of Cape Flattery is almost exactly as far west as Cape Alava, the difference being approximately 5 seconds of longitude, about 360 feet (110 m), at high tide and somewhat more at low tide.

The Cape Flattery Lighthouse is on Tatoosh Island, just off the cape. Makah Bay and Neah Bay are on either side of the cape. Neah Bay, Washington is the closest town to the cape.

== History ==
=== James Cook ===
Cape Flattery is the oldest non-Native permanently named feature in Washington state, being described and named by James Cook on March 22, 1778. Cook wrote: "... there appeared to be a small opening which flattered us with the hopes of finding an harbour ... On this account I called the point of land to the north of it Cape Flattery."

=== Japanese castaways in 1834 ===
In 1834, the first Japanese persons (Iwakichi, Kyukichi, and Otokichi, or Three Kichis) known to have set foot on what is now Washington state arrived in a dismasted, rudderless ship that ran aground near Cape Flattery. The three survivors of the broken ship were briefly enslaved by the local Makah people.

When William H. McNeill learned about them, he took them to British authorities at Fort Vancouver, under orders from John McLoughlin of the Hudson's Bay Company which controlled the site.

An American attempt to repatriate them to Japan would fail in the 1837 Morrison incident.

A Monument to the Three Kichis was built in Vancouver in 1989.

== Fuca Pillar ==
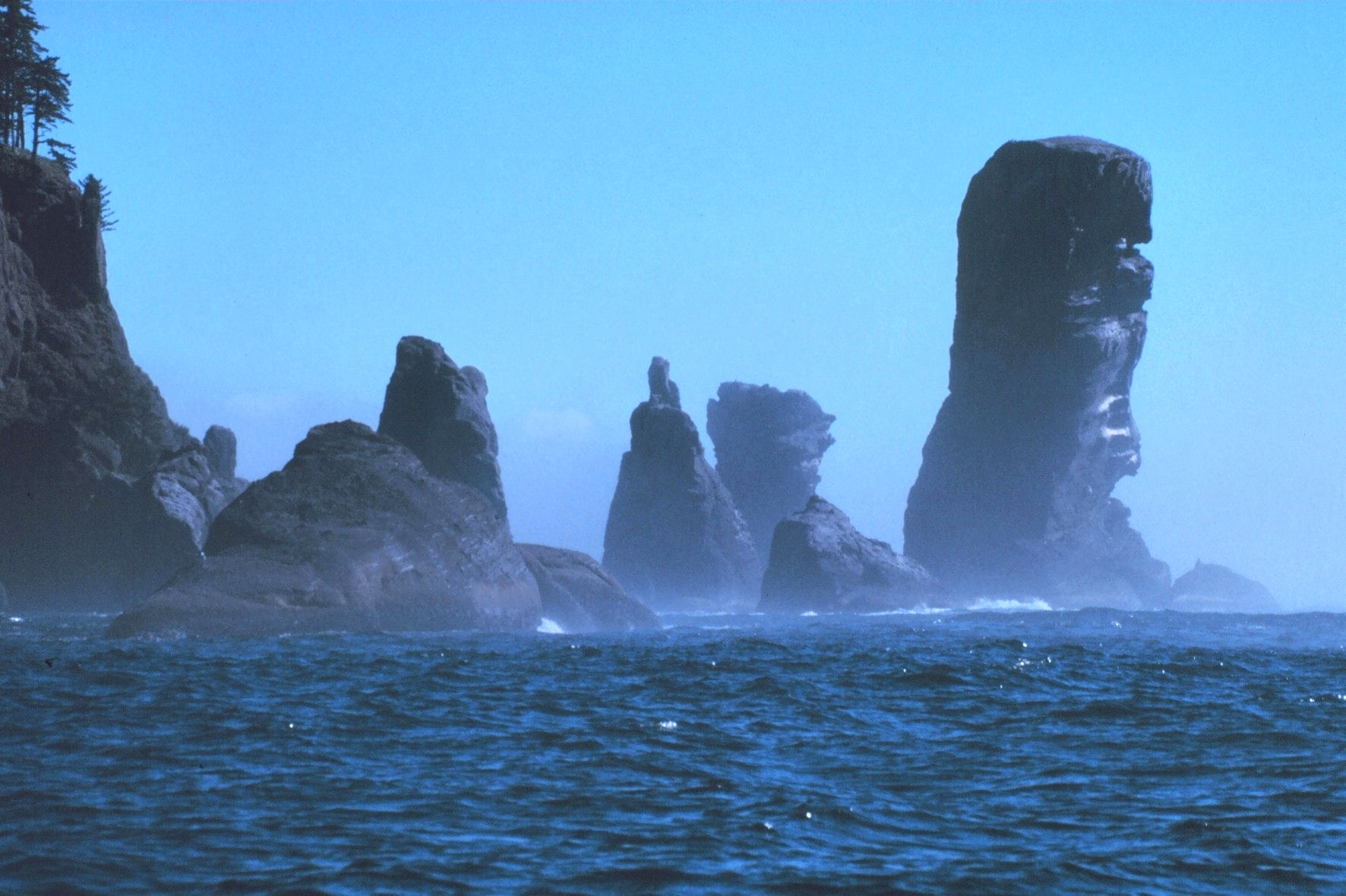
Fuca Pillar at Cape Flattery, the northwest extremity of the Olympic Peninsula

Fuca Pillar is a tall, almost rectangular, rock on the west side of Cape Flattery. It is named after Juan de Fuca, a Greek sailor who explored for Spain. Fuca has a doubtful claim to being the first European explorer to see the Fuca Pillar and to explore the Strait of Juan de Fuca, also named after him. The first generally accepted mention of the pillar was by John Meares in 1788.

== In popular culture ==
=== Movies ===
Cape Flattery was the hometown of the fictional characters Ma and Pa Kettle from the "Ma and Pa Kettle" movie series.

=== Literature ===
- Parts of the young adult novel Freaky Green Eyes (2003) by Joyce Carol Oates are set here in present day.
