= Jane Lubchenco =

American ecologist (born 1947)

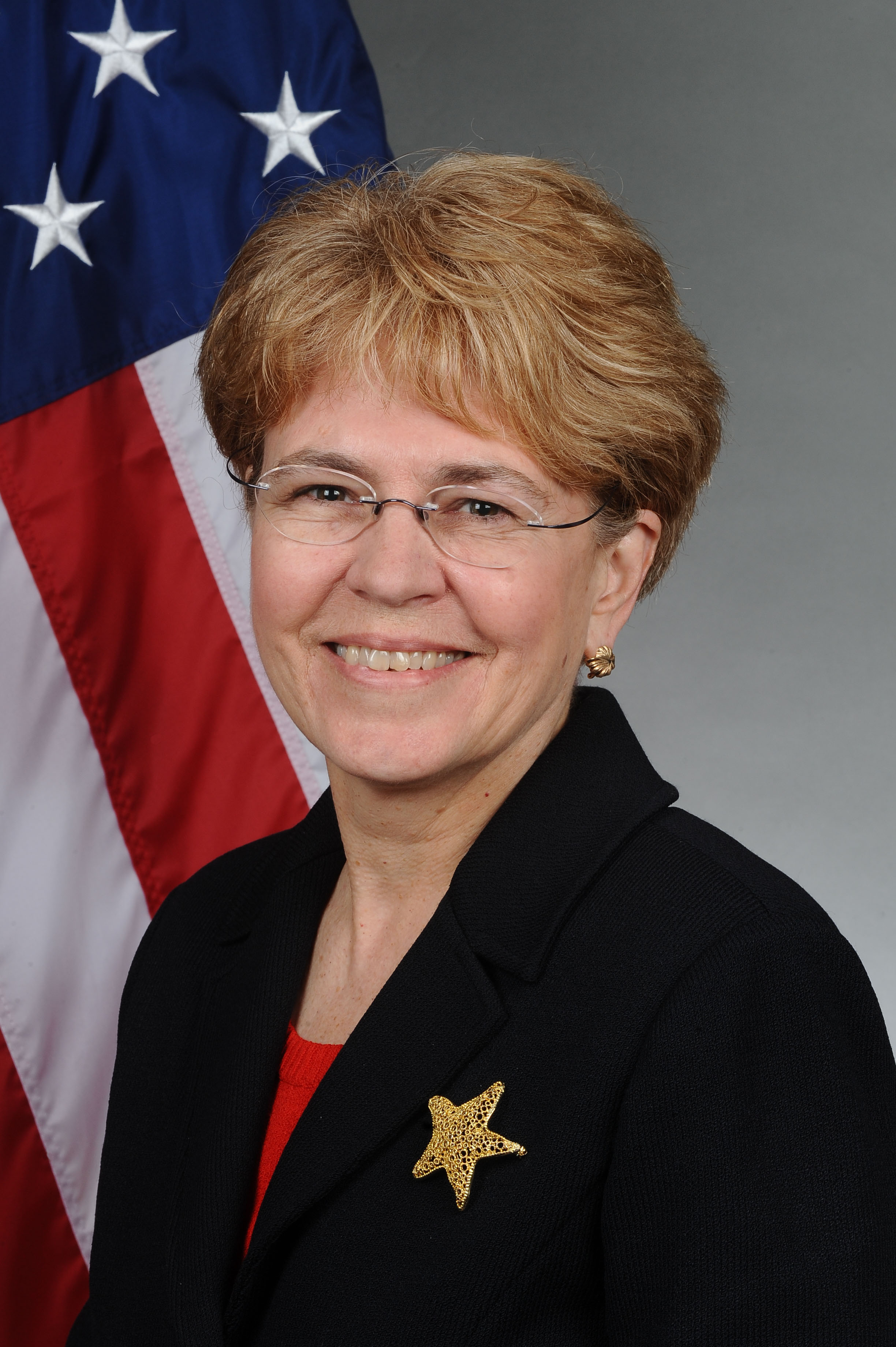

9th Under Secretary of Commerce for Oceans and Atmosphere 9th Administrator of the National Oceanic and Atmospheric Administration
- In office March 20, 2009 – February 28, 2013
- President: Barack Obama
- Preceded by: Conrad C. Lautenbacher
- Succeeded by: Kathryn D. Sullivan

Personal details
- Born: December 4, 1947 (age 78) Denver, Colorado, U.S.
- Education: Colorado College (BS); University of Washington (MS); Harvard University (PhD)
- Scientific career
- Fields: Marine ecology
- Workplaces: Harvard University; Oregon State University; National Oceanic and Atmospheric Administration; Office of Science and Technology Policy
- Thesis: Effect of Herbivores on Community Structure of the New England Rocky Intertidal Region: Distribution, Abundance and Diversity of Algae (1975)

Jane Lubchenco (born December 4, 1947) is a decorated American environmental scientist, marine ecologist, and U.S. government executive.

From 2009 to 2013, she was appointed by President Obama to serve as the 9th Administrator of NOAA and Under Secretary of Commerce for Oceans and Atmosphere. In February 2021, she was appointed by President Joe Biden to serve as deputy director for Climate and Environment in the White House Office of Science and Technology Policy.

She currently teaches and conducts academic research at Oregon State University. Her research includes interactions between the environment and human well-being, biodiversity, climate change, and sustainable use of oceans and the planet.

During her time at NOAA, she was the Mimi and Peter Haas Distinguished Visitor in Public Service at Stanford University (March–June 2013). In June 2013, she returned to Oregon State University where she was on the faculty prior to being invited by President-Elect Obama to serve on his 'science team.' Her many awards include the MacArthur 'genius' award in 1993 and more than 20 Honorary Degrees. In 2002, Discover magazine recognized Lubchenco as one of the 50 most important women in science. In 2010, she was named as the scientific journal Nature's first Newsmaker of the Year.

== Early life and education ==
Lubchenco was born on December 4, 1947, and grew up in Denver, Colorado, the oldest of six sisters. Her father, Michael Lubchenco, a surgeon from South Carolina, was of Ukrainian, French, English, Scottish and Irish descent and her mother, LaMeta Dahl Lubchenco, a pediatrician from North Dakota and Minnesota, had Norwegian, French and English ancestry. Lubchenco attended St. Mary's Academy, a Catholic girls high school. She studied as a Ford Independent Studies scholar at Colorado College in Colorado Springs, graduating with a B.A. in biology in 1969. During college, a summer class in invertebrate zoology at the Marine Biological Laboratory in Woods Hole, Massachusetts, sparked her interest in marine biology and research. She attended graduate school at the University of Washington where she combined experimental and evolutionary approaches to marine ecology for her thesis on competition between sea stars. Lubchenco graduated with an M.S. in zoology in 1971 and then a Ph.D. in 1975 in marine ecology from Harvard University. Her dissertation dealt with the population and community ecology of rocky sea shores in New England, in particular the role of herbivores, competition among seaweeds, and seaweed defenses against grazers.

== Academic career ==
After obtaining her Ph.D. in 1975, Lubchenco was hired as an assistant professor at Harvard University. In 1977, she and her husband moved to Oregon State University (OSU) in Corvallis, Oregon, where she was assistant professor (1977–1982), associate professor (1982–1988) and full professor (1988–2009, 2013–present), with a hiatus for government service. Lubchenco served as chair of the Department of Zoology from 1989 to 1992 and in 1993 was named Distinguished Professor of Zoology. In 1995, she and her husband, Bruce A. Menge, were both named Wayne and Gladys Valley Professors of Marine Biology, endowed chair positions in the Department of Zoology. A unique aspect of Lubchenco's position at Oregon State University was the pioneering appointment she and her husband negotiated with the university. They split a single assistant professor position into two, separate, half-time but tenure-track positions. At a time when good day care was not available, this novel arrangement allowed each to spend considerable time with their family while also teaching and doing research. This two half-time, tenure-track arrangement for a couple seems to have been the first in the U.S., although thousands of couples have since negotiated similar positions. Each worked half-time for ten years, then three-quarters-time for two years before returning to full-time in 1989, all at OSU. During their time at OSU, Lubchenco and Menge have jointly advised and awarded degrees to 30 Ph.D. and 10 M.S. candidates.

Lubchenco took a leave of absence from Oregon State University to serve as NOAA Administrator (2009–2013). After spending three months as Haas Distinguished Visitor in Public Service at Stanford University in the spring of 2013, she returned to OSU. Lubchenco has also been a research associate at the Smithsonian Institution (1978–1984) while she conducted research at the Smithsonian Tropical Research Institute in Panama. She has also taught courses or conducted extended research at the University of the West Indies, Kingston, Jamaica (1976); Universidad Catolica de Chile, Santiago, Chile (1986); Institute of Oceanography, Academia Sinica, Qingdao, China (1987); and University of Canterbury, Christchurch, New Zealand (1994–95, 1999–2000, 2002–03).

== Controversy ==
In 2021, the editors of the Proceedings of the (U.S.) National Academy of Sciences (PNAS) retracted an article for which Lubchenco served as editor. According to PNAS editors, the reason for the retraction was that Lubchenco had "recently published a related paper with the article's authors and has a personal relationship with one of the authors, both of which are disallowed by PNAS editorial policies". In response to the retraction, Lubchenco said, "I greatly regret the poor decision I made quite some time ago in agreeing to edit this paper." In response to allegations of technical and analytical flaws in the research, the authors of the retracted paper acknowledged that, ". . . changes to our results arising from the data error have cast doubt over the outcome of the peer review process, ultimately leading to the retraction of this paper." Since 2021, Lubchenco has served as co-chair of the White House's Scientific Integrity Task Force. In response to the decision by the editors to retract the paper and the conflict of interest charges against Lubchenco, an official of the White House Office of Science and Technology Policy agreed that the paper should be retracted, but ". . . there's no evidence that Jane's [Lubchenco's] work with the task force resulted in any pulled punch on the topic." On February 10, 2022, three senior Republican members of the U.S. House of Representatives' Committee on Science, Space, and Technology sent a letter to the President of the United States asking for an investigation of Lubchenco's professional behavior and encouraging "... you to consider if Dr. Lubchenco should continue to be involved in developing a framework for the improvement of agency scientific integrity policies and practices when she has violated the very policies she is tasked with imposing on Federal agencies."

In August 2022, the National Academy of Sciences stated, "[e]ffective August 8, for a five-year period, the NAS Council has barred Jane Lubchenco from being involved in NAS publications; serving on or participating in NAS and NRC program activities; and receiving NAS honors or awards." The publication Axios noted, the ban "stems from section 3 of its code of conduct. It states that members "shall avoid those detrimental research practices that are clear violations of the fundamental tenets of research."

== Science communication ==
Throughout her career, Lubchenco has emphasized the responsibilities scientists have to society and the importance of effective communication between scientists and society. In her 1997 address as President of the American Association for the Advancement of Science, she focused on scientists' "social contract" with society, i.e. their obligation to not only create new knowledge that is helpful to society but also to share that knowledge widely, not just with other scientists. She created three organizations devoted to helping scientists become better communicators. In 1998 and 1999, respectively, she founded the Aldo Leopold Leadership Program (now the Earth Leadership Program) and COMPASS that train scientists to communicate their research more effectively to citizens, the media, policymakers and business leaders. In 2007, Lubchenco co-founded Climate Central, a not-for-profit, non-advocacy organization whose mission is to communicate the science of climate change to U.S. audiences in a manner that is understandable, relevant, credible and useful.

Lubchenco builds bridges between the scientific community and the general public through her public lectures (e.g. National Academy of Science Public Welfare Medal lecture), writing (e.g. Frontiers in Ecology editorial), and service to various scientific, non-governmental and governmental organizations. She has been a member of the Pew Oceans Commission, the Joint Oceans Commission Initiative, the Aspen Institute Arctic Commission, and the Council of Advisors for Google Ocean.

== Scientific leadership ==
Lubchenco has served the scientific community through leadership in numerous professional societies. She was president of the American Association for the Advancement of Science (AAAS; 1997–8), the International Council for Science (ICSU; 2002–5), and the Ecological Society of America (1992–93). She served two terms as a Presidentially nominated, Senate-confirmed Member of the National Science Board (1996–2006) and was elected to the Council of the National Academy of Sciences and appointed to its executive committee. She has been on the editorial boards of many of the major journals in her field.

== Sustainability science ==
Lubchenco led the effort of the Ecological Society of America to identify scientific research priorities (biodiversity, climate change and sustainability science); this effort, called the Sustainable Biosphere Initiative (SBI), charted a new course for the professional scientific society toward more use-inspired science. The SBI connected the dots between seemingly esoteric research topics and real-world environmental problems, demonstrating the relevance and importance of ecological science.

Lubchenco co-founded a research/monitoring/communications collaboration that sought to understand how the near-shore portion of the large marine ecosystem off the coasts of Washington, Oregon and California works and is changing, with an eye to improving management and policy. This collaboration across four universities (Oregon State University, University of California, Santa Cruz, Stanford University, University of California, Santa Barbara), called the Partnership for Interdisciplinary Studies of Coastal Oceans (PISCO) provided a new model for conducting ecosystem-wide research in which each university would conduct the same basic monitoring and research for its portion of the shoreline, allowing greater comparability and power across the entire system. Findings from the PISCO team have been used by managers and policy makers, to understand the emergence of new "dead zones," and the impacts of climate change, ocean acidification, and sea star wasting disease off Washington and Oregon. Further, the findings have been used to inform selection criteria for networks of marine reserves and Marine Protected Areas in California, Washington, and Oregon.

== Marine reserves and marine protected areas ==
Lubchenco led an influential study of the science of marine reserves (also called 'no-take' marine protected areas) – areas of the ocean protected from any extractive or destructive activities. The study showed that reserves result in significant increases in abundance, size and diversity of species within the reserve, and that some of this bounty spills over to the area outside the reserve. This study also proposed the concept of 'networks' of reserves – reserves within a large marine ecosystem that are connected by the movement of juveniles or adults. In 1997 at the AAAS Annual Meeting, she famously proposed the '20% by 2020' phrase – that 20% of the world's oceans be protected in marine reserves by the year 2020 to draw attention to the urgent need to protect and restore the health of our oceans. This proposal and other efforts to promote marine reserves have attracted both controversy and resistance from those who wish to keep extracting resources from oceans. More recently, where fishermen have exclusive rights to fish along the margins of marine reserves, and thus benefit from the bounty spilling out from the reserve, they have championed establishment of more reserves. As part of the ongoing efforts to promote marine reserves, Lubchenco established the Science of Marine Reserves project—an international collaboration within PISCO to study, synthesize, and share information on MPAs globally—in 2005. Dr. Lubchenco currently oversees these efforts and is an active contributor to MPA research and discussions. She was part of a study on the potential of well-managed marine reserves to mitigate and promote climate change adaptation by limiting direct anthropogenic stressors, enabling species recovery, and restoring habitat complexity. More recently, she and her collaborators provided a novel approach to reconcile multiple goals for MPAs: biodiversity protection, food production, and climate mitigation.

Lubchenco is currently working on an international collaboration to bring clarity and transparency to global MPA design and reporting. This effort, known as The MPA Guide, clarifies the four Stages of Implementation of MPAs (Proposed/Committed, Designated, Implemented and Actively Managed); four Levels of Protection (Fully Protected, Highly Protected, Lightly Protected and Minimally Protected); and the outcomes that can be expected from different types of MPAs, as long as Enabling Conditions are in place.

== NOAA ==
=== Appointment ===
Lubchenco and cartoonist Jim Toomey unveil the poster he designed for the National Oceanic and Atmospheric Administration's Marine Protected Areas Center in 2009.

Lubchenco served as Under Secretary of Commerce for Oceans and Atmosphere and Administrator of the National Oceanic and Atmospheric Administration (NOAA) from 2009 to 2013. She was nominated by President-Elect Barack Obama as a part of his new "Science Team" in December 2008, confirmed by the Senate on March 19, 2009, and sworn in on March 20, 2009. To introduce her to his Senate colleagues for her confirmation hearing, Senator Ron Wyden (D-OR) called Lubchenco 'the bionic woman of good science.'. She served as Administrator for nearly four years until her resignation on February 27, 2013.

NOAA is the nation's top science agency for climate, weather, and oceans. As head of NOAA, Lubchenco oversaw a staff of 12,800 employees, a budget of ca $5 billion, and ensured NOAA carried out its mission "To understand and predict changes in climate, weather, oceans, and coasts, to share that knowledge and information with others, and to conserve and manage coastal and marine ecosystems and resources.". Lubchenco is both the first woman and the first marine ecologist to occupy the post. During her tenure at NOAA, she helped guide the nation through disasters such as the Deepwater Horizon oil spill and some of the most severe weather on record. She also oversaw the formulation of NOAA's first scientific integrity policy, the implementation of Congress' instructions to end overfishing in U.S. waters by having management plans for every fishery, the restructuring of the program responsible for building the next generation of weather satellites, and assisted with the creation of the first National Ocean Policy for the United States.

=== Strengthening science ===
NOAA's ability to provide services and stewardship depends on having credible scientific information and good scientists. Lubchenco helped to strengthen science in the agency in a number of ways. First, the position of Chief Scientist, previously vacant for 16 years, was reinstated, although the Senate did not act to confirm the President's nominee at this time. Second, NOAA doubled the number of senior scientist positions, and created a scientific Council of Fellows. Third, under her leadership, NOAA created its first Scientific Integrity Policy. The Scientific Integrity Policy allows NOAA scientists to speak freely to the media and public, and forbids the manipulation, suppression, distortion and misuse of science in the agency. Early in President Obama's administration, he charged agencies with establishing strong scientific integrity policies that would 'return science to its rightful place' in government. NOAA's Scientific Integrity Policy has been called the "Platinum Standard" for agency policies in protecting the rights of scientists to communicate freely and in ensuring policy makers will not suppress or modify scientific findings. In addition, a first-ever all-agency-scientist workshop was held to identify scientific priorities and ways to strengthen science at the agency. This workshop helped form the foundation of NOAA's Next Generation Strategic Plan, which assesses the highest priority opportunities for NOAA to contribute to the advancement of society.

=== Deepwater Horizon oil spill ===
On April 20, 2010, the Deepwater Horizon oil rig off the coast of Louisiana unexpectedly exploded, causing oil to freely flow into the Gulf of Mexico for the next 87 days. NOAA was one of the lead agencies responsible for responding to the oil spill. Lubchenco led NOAA's response and coordination with 13 other agencies. NOAA provided data from satellites, planes, ships and buoys, and on-the-ground scientists to help track the oil and forecast where it would go; local weather forecasts to inform responders; scientific advice to the U.S. Coast Guard who is in charge of an oil spill in U.S. waters; kept seafood safe by closing fisheries in U.S. waters when oil was present or expected to be present; developed protocols with other agencies to reopen closed areas; protected endangered species such as turtles; and evaluated the impact of the spill on the natural resources of the Gulf and the public's access to them. Lubchenco was frequently interviewed by the media as a federal science expert, and helped disseminate the working knowledge of the response to the public. NOAA scientists and their academic partners continue to analyze and monitor the effects of the spill on the Gulf of Mexico ecosystem where both offshore and nearshore organisms and habitats were impacted. Despite measures to reduce coastal oiling, approximately 2100 km of nearshore and coastal habitats were affected.

On April 4, 2016, a Federal District judge approved a $20.8 billion settlement between the U.S. and five Gulf States and BP making the civil lawsuit over the Deepwater Horizon oil spill the largest environmental damage settlement with a single entity in U.S. history. Of this settlement amount, up to $8.8 billion was allocated toward natural resource damages.

=== Oceans and coasts ===
Lubchenco helped craft the United States' National Ocean Policy, a document that provides a science-based blueprint for managing the U.S.'s oceans, coasts and Great Lakes to help mitigate conflicts between different ocean users (fishermen, shippers, natural resource managers, etc.) and ensure an overarching focus on good stewardship. She actively participated in the President's Interagency Ocean Policy Task Force and attended all of the six regional meetings across the country to gather stakeholder input. Recommendations of this Task Force were adopted by President Obama as the nation's first formal policy on oceans on July 19, 2010. While environmental groups, federal and state lawmakers, and federal agency officials applauded the policy, some lawmakers and members of industry felt that it would provide too much regulation. Despite some opposition, on April 16, 2013, the Obama administration laid out an implementation plan for the National Ocean Policy to put into practice the recommendations laid out in the policy. Since that time, the Northeast and Mid-Atlantic Regional Planning Bodies have completed new Regional Ocean Plans (Northeast Plan, Mid-Atlantic Plan) for which they were awarded the 2017 Excellence in Solutions Peter Benchley Ocean Award.

=== Fisheries ===
In 2006, Congress re-authorized the Magnuson-Stevens Act (MSA), the regulatory law for the U.S. fisheries in federal waters. Sustainable fisheries are critical for ensuring sustainable coastal economies and livelihoods. Under the MSA, NOAA was directed to end overfishing by 2010 by having a management plan for each federally managed fishery. Lubchenco led NOAA's efforts to develop MSA management plans, which specify annual catch limits and accountability measures for each fishery. As of July 2011, in collaboration with the Fishery Management Councils in each region, NOAA completed this task. Lubchenco's support for limiting fishing in coastal communities led to some Congressmen calling for her resignation.[14, 16] Creating catch limits is often controversial, but thanks to these plans and their enforcement, overfishing is ending in U.S. waters and many depleted fisheries are recovering. According to NOAA, 2012 had the lowest number of stocks on the overfishing list and 32 stocks have been rebuilt since 2000, most within the last few years, creating more sustainable fishing opportunities and healthy ecosystems. In an email to NOAA employees, Lubchenco listed "ending over-fishing, rebuilding depleted stocks, and returning fishing to profitability" as a major accomplishment of NOAA during her tenure."

Under Lubchenco's leadership, NOAA also pursued use of 'catch shares' as a viable fishery management tool for appropriate fisheries. Although catch shares have been used since 1990 in the U.S., scientific evidence about their merits suggests that the wider use of catch shares may benefit many other fisheries, making them once again profitable and sustainable. Science magazine quoted Lubchenco on catch shares, saying:

Recent scientific analyses show us that fisheries managed with catch share programs perform better than fisheries managed with traditional tools. Even in the first years after implementation, catch share fisheries are stable, and even increase their productivity ... I see catch shares as the best way for many fisheries to both meet the Magnuson mandates and have healthy, profitable fisheries that are sustainable.

In 2010, after extensive consultation with regional fishery management councils, NOAA adopted its National Catch Share Policy, which encourages the use of catch shares where appropriate. Although critics asserted that NOAA imposed catch shares on fisheries, the policy makes it clear that they are not required, nor are they appropriate for every fishery. NOAA's Catch Share Policy remains controversial, with critics asserting it cuts jobs for fishermen and takes away money from small coastal economies. However, many coastal economies are beginning to embrace this type of fisheries management and, with the help of NOAA, are implementing a catch share-based system. During the four years Lubchenco was at NOAA, the number of catch share programs grew from 5 to 15. In most of those programs, profitability is up, innovation by fishermen has increased and discards are down.

During Lubchenco's tenure, NOAA's law enforcement program came under fire. After hearing from fishermen and members of Congress about problems, she requested a review of the program from the Department of Commerce Inspector General. The problems identified by the review were addressed when Lubchenco initiated a top-to-bottom overhaul of the program, including improvements to policy for assessing penalties, limited use of civil funds, updates to its National and Division Enforcement Priorities with stakeholder input, and a plan to create enforcement positions that better ensure compliance. As these changes were being implemented, additional past problems came to light, triggering additional reforms.

Lubchenco also pushed for greater attention to recreational fishing. She created a new position at NOAA to oversee and represent saltwater fishing interests, called for a Saltwater Recreational Fishing Summit, met with recreational fishing groups frequently, and increased data collection about recreational fisheries to provide a better basis for management. Despite significant progress, many recreational fishing organizations continue to express distrust and unhappiness with Lubchenco in particular and NOAA in general.

On the international front, Lubchenco increased the number of efforts aimed at addressing overfishing and illegal, unreported and unregulated (IUU) fishing on the high seas. She teamed up with the Commissioner of Fisheries for the European Union, Maria Damanaki to initiate a more serious effort to address illegal fishing and level the playing field for law-abiding fishermen. Lubchenco worked to see international treaties on IUU fishing approved and strengthened the use of science and precaution in making decisions by regional fishery management organizations. Specifically, during her tenure as NOAA Administrator, the Port State Measures Agreement (PSMA) to Prevent, Deter, and Eliminate IUU Fishing through the United Nations Food and Agriculture Organization was finalized and went into effect. As of August 2019, 50 countries have signed the agreement.

=== Climate services ===
Providing data, services and products related to forecasting a changing climate is a main priority for NOAA scientists. Lubchenco strengthened these efforts. One of her initial goals was to establish the National Climate Service, which would have re-organized NOAA to better provide climate services and products to the public13. However, congressional opposition prevented the budget-neutral re-organization from moving forward. Nonetheless, responding to increasing demands for climate services, under Lubchenco's leadership, NOAA initiated a number of steps. Climate.gov was created in 2012 as a "one-stop shop" for climate information. In 2011 NOAA signed a Memorandum of Understanding with the Western Governors' Association to provide western states with a range of climate services, for example information about impending drought. She said, "Creating a new generation of climate services to promote public understanding, support mitigation and adaptation efforts, enable smart planning, and promote regional climate partnerships" were some of the things she was most proud of during her tenure.

During her time, NOAA also led federal agency efforts to develop the most ambitious National Climate Assessment ever conducted.

=== Weather-Ready Nation ===
From 2009 to 2013, the nation experienced some of the most extreme weather on record. NOAA delivered life-saving forecasts for 770 tornadoes, 70 Atlantic hurricanes/tropical storms, six major floods, three tsunamis, historic drought, prolonged heat waves, record snowfall/blizzard. Dr. Lubchenco has said that "bizarre, crazy weather" came to define her term as NOAA Administrator.

In 2011, NOAA's National Weather Service, the source of all official weather warnings and the main weather forecasting body in the country, decided it could no longer gauge its performance by the accuracy and timeliness of its forecast – it needed to also understand how effective these were at getting people to respond. Under the lead of Dr. Lubchenco, NOAA launched the "Weather-Ready Nation" initiative in the summer of 2011 to help build resilience and improve on-the-ground response to extreme weather and water events. In March 2011, NOAA initiated the nation's most ambitious upgrading of its weather radar network, converting all of its 160 radar sites to dual polarization technology, which vastly improves the accuracy and timeliness of forecasts related to weather and water activity.

=== Hurricane Sandy ===
In late October 2012, Hurricane Sandy hit the east coast of the United States, devastating communities across the eastern seaboard and west to Michigan and Wisconsin. NOAA technology and scientists helped to accurately predict the path of the storm, allowing on-the-ground warnings to be issued in time to save lives.

=== Tohōku earthquake ===
On March 11, 2011, the large Tohoku earthquake occurred off the coast of Japan, which was the precursor to the devastating Fukushima earthquake one month later. NOAA was involved in predicting where radioactive material and marine debris would go, how the currents would carry the material, and helping coastal states and communities prepare for dealing with the debris when it arrived.

== U.S. Science Envoy for the Ocean ==
=== Appointment ===
On December 4, 2014, Lubchenco was appointed the U.S. Department of State's first Science Envoy for the Ocean (SEO) by Secretary of State John Kerry. As SEO, Dr. Lubchenco's mission was to integrate scientific knowledge with the creation of sustainable solutions that improve global relationships, ocean health, and thus the well-being of human communities around the world. Following discussions with the Department of State, Lubchenco chose six developing countries in Africa and Asia to focus her ocean diplomacy work (South Africa, Seychelles, Mauritius, Indonesia, and China). The year-long tenure of science envoys required Lubchenco be strategic—relying on targeted information and guidance and working closely with key stakeholders—to realize the specific goals of each region. Serving from 2015 to 2016, Lubchenco fostered a dialogue between local communities, resource users and managers, government officials, non-governmental organizations, and academics to build upon initiatives that connect science to effective policy and management. Some of the key issue areas for Lubchenco as the SEO included ocean acidification, climate change adaptation and mitigation, sustainable fisheries, aquaculture, marine spatial planning, and marine protected areas. She applied information and experiences gained as a 'global diplomat for the ocean' to advise the White House, State Department, and U.S. science community.

=== Africa ===
Lubchenco's inaugural trip as SEO was in July 2015 to South Africa, Mauritius, and Seychelles. Dr. Lubchenco's SEO efforts in Seychelles, South Africa, and Mauritius led to the formal establishment of the Forum on African Marine Science and helped build support for a landmark deal to expand marine protection and create dedicated funding for climate adaptation in Seychelles. Led by the U.S. based Nature Conservancy and the government of Seychelles, the deal had Seychelles protect 30% of its ocean territory in exchange for the cancellation of $30 million in debt by foreign investor group. It was the first ever debt-for-nature swap in the ocean.

=== Asia ===
In 2016, Lubchenco continued her work as SEO, travelling to China and Indonesia. In China, Dr. Lubchenco helped promote the establishment of a new US – China Joint Scientific Experts Group to operate under the established "SOA-NOAA Joint Working Group on Cooperation on Marine and Fishery Science and Technology" and extend the US-China Framework Plan for Ocean and Fishery Science and Technology Cooperation that was in effect 2011–2015. In Indonesia, Lubchenco helped facilitate the creation of a working partnership between Indonesian Ministry of Marine Affairs and Fisheries and UC Santa Barbara scientists to help build technical capacity for fisheries management in Indonesia that is informed by good science. More specifically, the Sustainable Fisheries Group works to "analyze the potential benefits of fishery reform in Indonesia and evaluate the impacts of recent IUU efforts."

== Awards and honors ==
Lubchenco is an elected member of:

- American Association for the Advancement of Science (1990)
- American Academy of Arts and Sciences (1993)
- National Academy of Sciences (1996)
- American Philosophical Society (1998)
- Royal Society (2004)
- European Academy of Science (2002–2014)
- World Academy of Sciences (2004)
- Academia Chilena de Ciencias (2007)
- American Society of Naturalists (2014)
- California Academy of Sciences (2017)

Her teaching, scientific achievements and work in furthering communication between science and the public have brought numerous honors, including:

- 24 honorary doctorates
- 1979: George Mercer Award (with Bruce Menge), Ecological Society of America
- 1986: Outstanding Teacher Award, Oregon State University, by OSU Alpha Lambda Delta (freshman honor society)
- 1992: Pew Scholar in Conservation and the Environment
- 1993: John D. and Catherine T. MacArthur Fellowship
- 1994: Oregon Scientist of the Year
- 1994: CINE Golden Eagle Award
- 1999: Howard Vollum Award
- 2001: Golden Plate Award of the American Academy of Achievement presented by Awards Council member Sylvia Earle
- 2002: 8th Annual Heinz Award in the Environment
- 2003: Nierenberg Prize for Science in the Public Interest
- 2004: Environmental Law Institute Award
- 2005: Public Understanding of Science and Technology Award, American Association for the Advancement of Science
- 2008: Zayed International Prize for the Environment
- 2010: Peter Benchley Ocean Award for Excellence in Policy
- 2010: Named the "2010 Newsmaker of the Year" by the scientific journal Nature
- 2011: Blue Planet Prize
- 2011: Public Understanding of Science Award, The Exploratorium
- 2012: Sailors for the Sea's Ocean Hero Award
- 2012: Presidential Citation for Science and Society, American Geophysical Union
- 2012: BBVA Foundation Frontiers of Knowledge Award in Ecology and Conservation Biology category
- 2012: Inducted into the Women in Science and Technology Hall of Fame
- 2013: Distinguished Public Service Award, the highest award the U.S. Coast Guard gives to a civilian
- 2013: The Prince Albert II of Monaco Foundation Climate Change Award
- 2015: Tyler Prize for Environmental Achievement
- 2016: ECI Prize for marine biology by the Ecology Institute
- 2016: Linus Pauling Legacy Award
- 2017: Public Welfare Medal for extraordinary contributions in science and to public good by the National Academy of Sciences
- 2017: California Academy of Sciences Fellow
- 2017: Oregon History Maker
- 2018: Vannevar Bush Award from the National Science Board
- 2018: Fellows Medal, California Academy of Sciences
- 2019: Ocean Tethys Award from the Ocean Visions Joint Initiative
- 2019: Harvard University Centennial Medal
- 2020: Honorary Member, American Meteorological Society
- 2020: Mary Sears Medal, inaugural award from The Oceanography Society "in honor of sustained, innovative, and impactful contributions in the areas of biological oceanography, marine biology, or marine ecology"
- According to ISI, she is one of the most highly citied ecologists in the world

== Research and publications ==
According to the Institute for Scientific Information, twelve of Lubchenco's numerous scientific papers have been cited so many times in other scientific publications they are considered 'science citation classic papers' or 'top 0.25% papers'. These papers report novel findings about the factors determining local and global patterns of distribution, abundance and diversity of species on rocky sea shores, interactions between people and nature, the importance of no-take marine protected areas and the responsibilities of scientists to society. The twelve classic papers are:

- Lubchenco, J.; Menge, Bruce A. (1978). "Community development and persistence in a low rocky intertidal zone". Ecological Monographs. 48 (1): 67–94. Bibcode:1978EcoM...48...67L. doi:10.2307/2937360. JSTOR 2937360. S2CID 83935834.
- Lubchenco, J. (1978). "Plant species diversity in a marine intertidal community: importance of herbivore food preference and algal competitive abilities". American Naturalist. 112 (983): 23–39. Bibcode:1978ANat..112...23L. doi:10.1086/283250. S2CID 84801707.
- Lubchenco, J.; Gaines, S.D. (1981). "A unified approach to marine plant herbivore interactions I. Populations and Communities". Annual Review of Ecology and Systematics. 12 (1): 405–437. Bibcode:1981AnRES..12..405L. doi:10.1146/annurev.es.12.110181.002201.
- Lubchenco, J.; A.M. Olson; L.B. Brubake; S.R. Carpenter; M.M. Holland; S.P. Hubbell; S.A. Levin; J.A. MacMahon; P.A. Matson; J.M. Melillo; H.A. Mooney; C.H. Peterson; H.R. Pulliam; L.A. Real; P.J. Regal; P.G. Risser (1991). "The Sustainable Biosphere Initiative: An Ecological Research Agenda". Ecology. 72 (2): 371–412. doi:10.2307/2937183. JSTOR 2937183.
- Power, M.; D. Tilman; J.A. Estes; B.A. Menge; W.J. Bond; L.S. Mills; G. Daily; J.C. Castilla; J. Lubchenco; R.T. Paine (1996). "Challenges in the quest for keystones". BioScience. 46 (8): 609–620. Bibcode:1996BiSci..46..609P. doi:10.2307/1312990. JSTOR 1312990.
- Vitousek, P.M.; H.A. Mooney; J. Lubchenco; J.M. Melillo (1997). "Human domination of earth's ecosystems". Science. 277 (5325): 494–499. doi:10.1126/science.277.5325.494. S2CID 8610995.
- Allison, G.W.; J. Lubchenco; M. Carr (1998). "Marine reserves are necessary but not sufficient for marine conservation". Ecological Applications. 8 (1): S79–S92. doi:10.1890/1051-0761(1998)8[S79:MRANBN]2.0.CO;2. JSTOR 2641365.
- Lubchenco, J. (1998). "Entering the century of the environment: A new social contract for science". Science. 279 (5350): 491–497. Bibcode:1998Sci...279..491L. doi:10.1126/science.279.5350.491.
- Naylor, R.L.; R.J. Goldburg; J. Primavera; N. Kautsky; M. Beveridge; J. Clay; C. Folke; J. Lubchenco; H. Mooney; M. Troell. (2000) "Effect of aquaculture on world fish supplies." Nature. 405: 1017–1024.
- Daily, G.C.; T. Soderqvist; S. Anivar; K. Arrow; P. Dasgupta; P.R. Ehrlich; C. Folke; A.M. Jansson; B.O. Jansson; N. Kautsky; S.A. Levin; J. Lubchenco; K.G. Maler; D. Simpson; D. Starrett; D. Tilman; B. Walker. (2000) "The Value of Nature and the Nature of Value." Science. 289: 396–396.
- Liu, J.; T. Dietz; S.R. Carpenter; M. Alberti; C. Folke; E. Moran; A.N. Pell; P. Deadman; T. Kratz; J. Lubchenco; E. Ostrom; Z. Ouyang; W. Provencher; C.L. Redman; S.H. Schneider; W.W. Taylor. (2007) "Complexity of Coupled Human and Natural Systems." Science. 317: 1513–1516.
- Lester, S.E.; B.S. Halpern; K. Grorud-Colvert; J. Lubchenco; B.I. Ruttenberg; S.D. Gaines; S. Airame; R.W. Warner. (2009) "Biological effects within no-take marine reserves: a global synthesis." Marine Ecology Progress Series. 384: 33–46.

Most of Lubchenco's earlier research concentrated on local ecological patterns of rocky sea shores and their causes; her later research looks at ocean ecosystems more broadly – how they work, how they are changing and implications for policy and management. She has shifted her focus to conducting research that informs sustainable use of oceans and has worked on a range of interrelated topics including aquaculture, fisheries, climate change, biodiversity, ecosystem services, dead zones (hypoxia and anoxia), ecosystem approaches to management and marine reserves.

Government offices
Preceded by William Brennan; Acting	Administrator of the National Oceanic and Atmospheric Administration; 2009–2013	Succeeded by Kathryn D. Sullivan
