= List of dams and reservoirs in Delaware =

Following is a list of dams and reservoirs in Delaware.

The National Inventory of Dams defines any "major dam" as being 50 feet (15 m) tall with a storage capacity of at least 5,000 acre-feet (6,200,000 m^{3}), or of any height with a storage capacity of 25,000 acre-feet (31,000,000 m^{3}).

== Dams and reservoirs in Delaware ==
- Bellevue Lake
- Edgar M. Hoopes Dam, Hoopes Reservoir, City of Wilmington, Delaware
- multiple dams, Newark Reservoir, City of Newark, Delaware
- Cubbage Pond, a reservoir on Cedar Creek in Sussex County, Delaware

== See also ==
- List of dam removals in Delaware
