= Aldwell =

Aldwell is a surname. Notable people with the surname include:

- Edward Aldwell (1938–2006), American pianist, music theorist and pedagogue
- Thomas Aldwell (1868–1954), Canadian businessman

== Other ==
- Lake Aldwell, a reservoir in Washington, US
