= Lake Sutherland =

Lake in Washington, United States

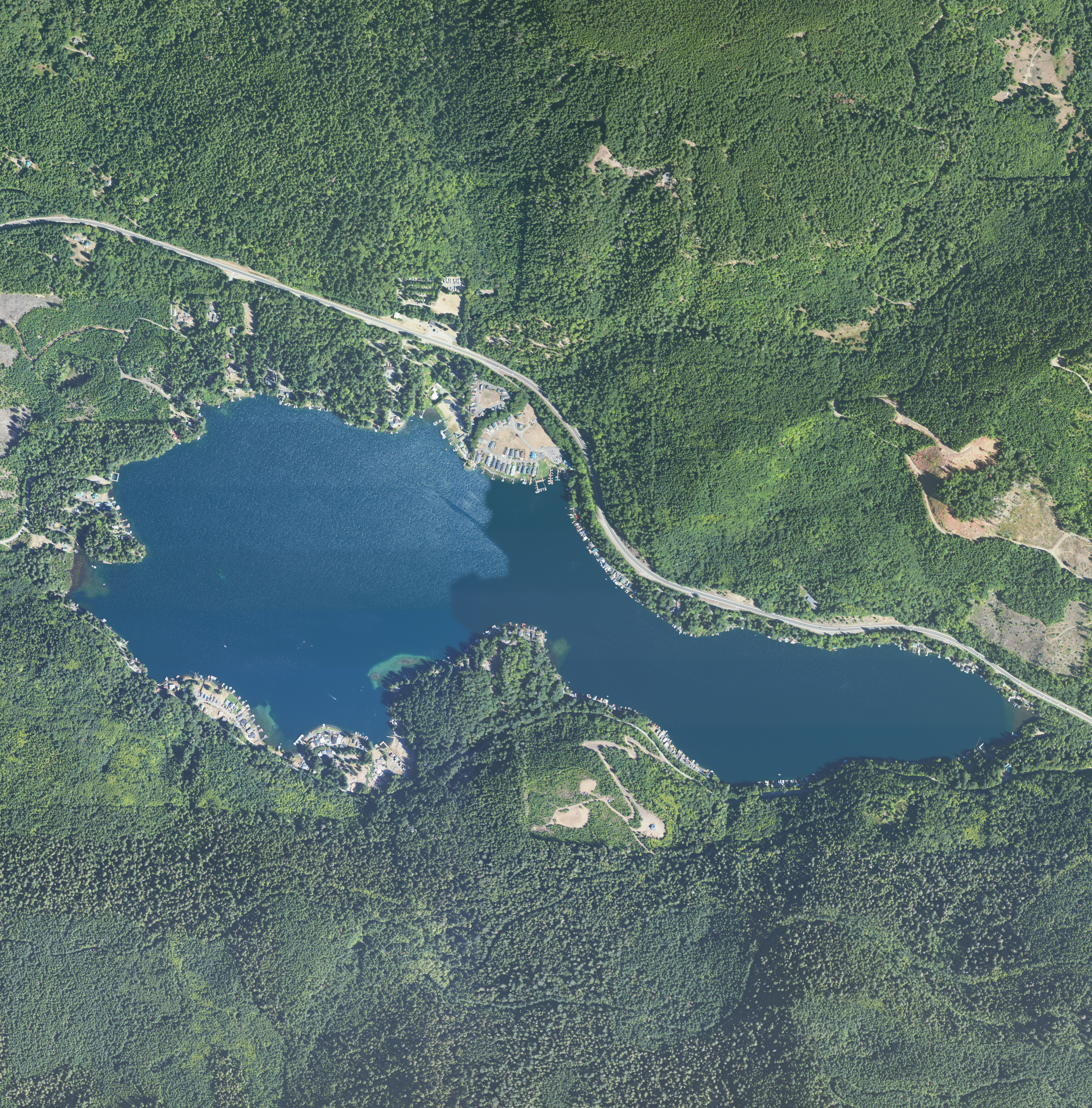
- Lake Sutherland in August 2023
- Location: Olympic Peninsula, Clallam County, Washington, United States
- Coordinates: 48°04′45″N 123°42′35″W
- Primary outflows: Indian Creek (Elwha)
- Basin countries: United States

Lake Sutherland is located on the Olympic Peninsula about 17 miles (27 km) west of Port Angeles, Washington. The lake is located just to the east of Lake Crescent. Lake Sutherland drains into Indian Creek, which is a tributary of the Elwha River.

Lake Sutherland is named for the Canadian fur trapper John Sutherland who, with John Everett, explored the lake around 1865. Lake Sutherland and Indian Creek sustained anadromous fish populations until construction of the Elwha Dam in 1913 blocked access to the ocean, eliminating several salmon species from Indian Creek and landlocking others.

The lake contains a population of kokanee sockeye salmon, which spawn in Lake Sutherland and until the removal of the Elwha Dam in 2012 migrated to Lake Aldwell.

Lake Sutherland lies just outside Olympic National Park and is private land. The lake is surrounded by houses.

There is also a reservoir in San Diego County, Situated between Ramona and Julian, with the same name.
