= List of dam removals in Louisiana =

This is a list of dams in Louisiana that have been removed as physical impediments to free-flowing rivers or streams.

== Completed removals ==
Dam	Height	Year removed	Location	Watercourse	Watershed
Bayou Dupont Number 13 Dam	23 ft (7.0 m)		Sabine Parish; 31.6672°N 93.3578°W	Tributary to Bayou Dupont	Red River
Kisatchie Lake Dam (upper) (Note: Dam was a causeway carrying a road. The area behind the removed dam remains largely flooded by the main Kisatchie Lake Dam.)	25 ft (7.6 m)		Grant Parish; 31.4552°N 92.4414°W	Dry Prong Creek	Red River
Castor Lake Dam	13 ft (4.0 m)		Vernon Parish; 31.1393°N 93.2096°W	Pond Branch	Sabine River
