= DamNation =

Damnation
- Official poster
- Directed by: Travis Rummel; Ben Knight
- Produced by: Matt Stoecker; Travis Rummel
- Cinematography: Ben Knight; Travis Rummel; Matt Stoecker
- Edited by: Ben Knight
- Release date: March 10, 2014 (SXSW)
- Country: United States
- Language: English

DamNation is a 2014 documentary directed by Ben Knight and Travis Rummel. It is an advocacy documentary film about the changing attitudes in the United States concerning the large system of dams in the country. The film follows the Restoration of the Elwha River, as well as a variety of other Dam removal efforts.

The film was produced by Patagonia, Inc., and released on March 10, 2014. Blu-ray and DVD versions were also released in 2014.

The film takes an explicit point of view in support of the emerging environmental strategy of dam removal as a way to restore river ecosystems.

== Awards ==
- "Documentary Spotlight" (audience award) at South by Southwest (SXSW Film Festival), 2014
- Winner, 2014 "Documentary Award for Environmental Advocacy," Environmental Film Festival in the Nation's Capital.
