= List of dam removals in Delaware =

This is a list of dams in Delaware that have been removed as physical impediments to free-flowing rivers or streams.

== Removals by watershed ==
=== Brandywine Creek ===
The West Street Dam on the Brandywine Creek was a water main encasement owned by the City of Wilmington. Its removal in 2019 occurred as part of an effort to restore American shad passage to the Brandywine Creek watershed.

== Completed removals ==
Dam	Height	Year removed	Location	Watercourse	Watershed
DuPont Experimental Station Dam (Brandywine Dam No. 6)	8 ft (2.4 m)	2025	Wilmington; 39.7711°N 75.5683°W	Brandywine Creek	Christina River
West Street Dam (Brandywine Dam No. 1)	3 ft (0.91 m)	2019	Wilmington; 39.7514°N 75.5475°W	Brandywine Creek	Christina River
Fell Spice Mill Dam		1950	Wilmington; 39.7502°N 75.6329°W	Red Clay Creek	Christina River
Byrnes Mill Dam (Dam No. 1)	13 ft (4.0 m)	2014	Newark; 39.698°N 75.6652°W	White Clay Creek	Christina River
