= Cubbage =

Cubbage is a surname. Notable people with the surname include:

- B. C. Cubbage (1895–1961), American football player and coach of football and basketball
- Mike Cubbage (1950−2024), American baseball player
- Patricia Cubbage (1958–1980), American murder victim

== Other ==
- Cubbage Pond, reservoir on Cedar Creek in Sussex County, Delaware
- Odessa Cubbage, minor character in the first-person shooter computer game, Half-Life 2
