= Restoration of the Elwha River =

Dam removal and ecosystem restoration project in Washington, United States

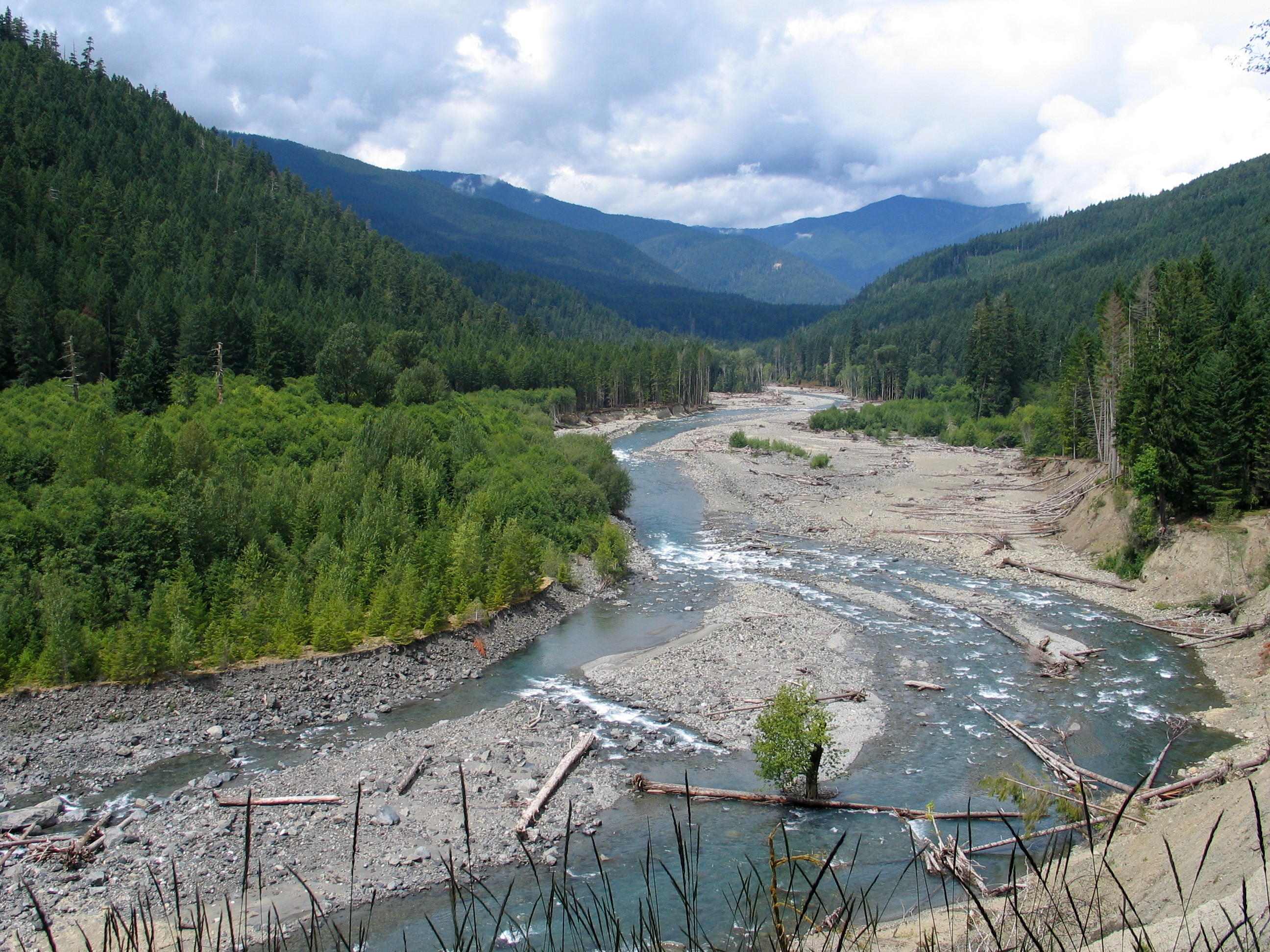
Elwha River

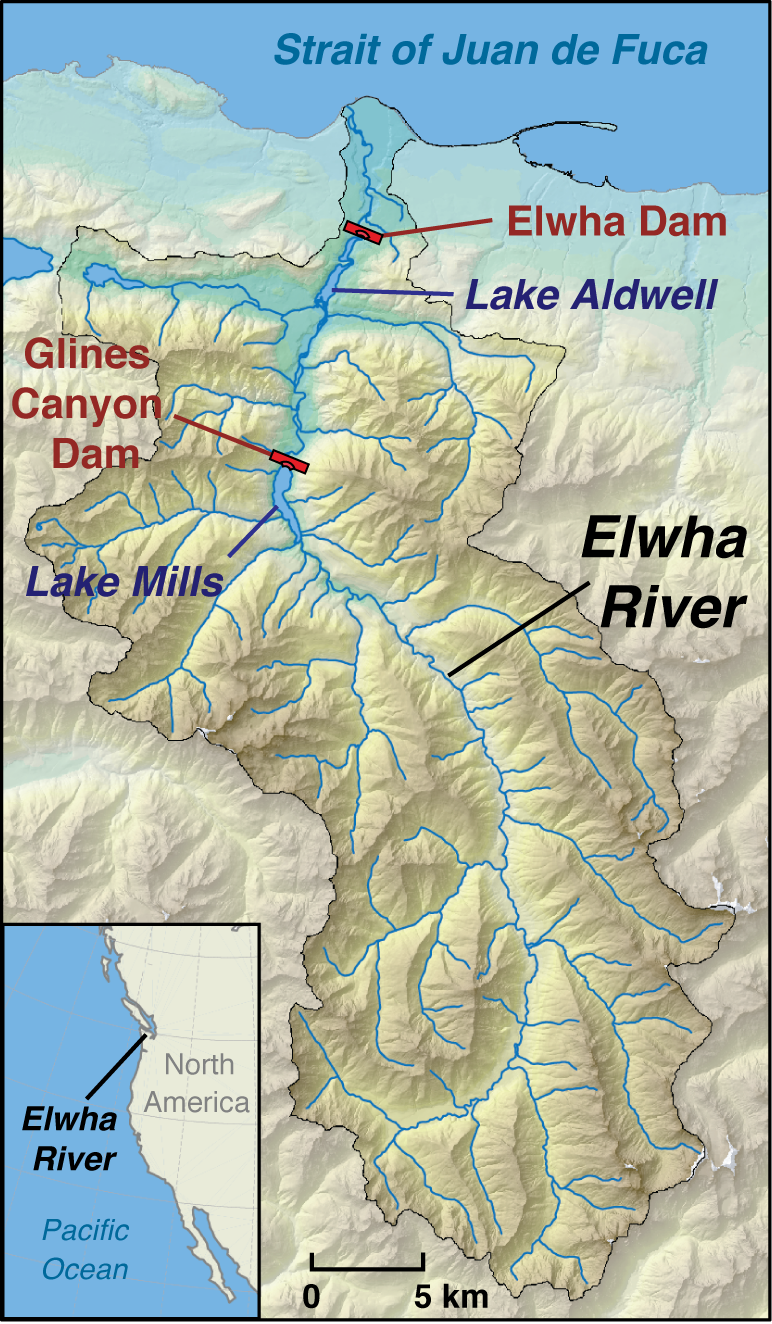
Map showing the location river, including the sites of two dams and their reservoirs, since removed

The Elwha Ecosystem Restoration Project is a 21st-century project of the U.S. National Park Service to remove two dams on the Elwha River on the Olympic Peninsula in Washington state, and restore the river to a natural state. Until 2024, it was the largest dam removal project in history and it is the second largest ecosystem restoration project in the history of the National Park Service, after the Restoration of the Everglades. The controversial project, costing about $351.4 million, has been contested and periodically blocked for decades. It has been supported by a major collaboration among the Lower Elwha Klallam Tribe, environmental organizations, and federal and state agencies.

The removal of the first of the two dams, the Elwha Dam, began in September 2011 and was completed ahead of schedule in March 2012. Removal of the second dam, the Glines Canyon Dam, was completed on August 26, 2014.

== History of the Elwha River ==
Upper Elwha River Watershed

Historically, the Elwha River was one of the few rivers in the contiguous United States that supported all of the anadromous salmonid species native to the Pacific Northwest. Ten stocks of anadromous salmon and trout species are known to have been present in the river before the dams were built: spring- and summer/fall-run Chinook salmon (Oncorhynchus tshawytscha), chum salmon (O. keta), coho salmon (O. kisutch), pink salmon (O. gorbuscha), sockeye salmon (O. nerka), summer- and winter-run steelhead trout (O. mykiss), bull trout (Salvelinus confluentus), and cutthroat trout (O. clarki clarki). The river was considered the most prolific fish producer on the Olympic Peninsula. It was particularly known for its very large Chinook salmon, weighing as much as 45 kilograms (99 lb). Prior to the construction of the two dams on the river in the early 20th century, an estimated 392,000 fish returned annually to spawn. By the late 20th century, the number had declined to less than 3,000.

Pink salmon were historically the most numerous salmon species in the river, with over 250,000 adult returns. By the 1980s that number fell to near zero. Coho occupied the largest area of the watershed, going up many of the tributaries, and nearly to the headwaters of the Elwha River.

Salmon were long an extremely important food source for the Lower Elwha Klallam people. They have occupied territory in this area for thousands of years, and still live on land at the mouth of the river.

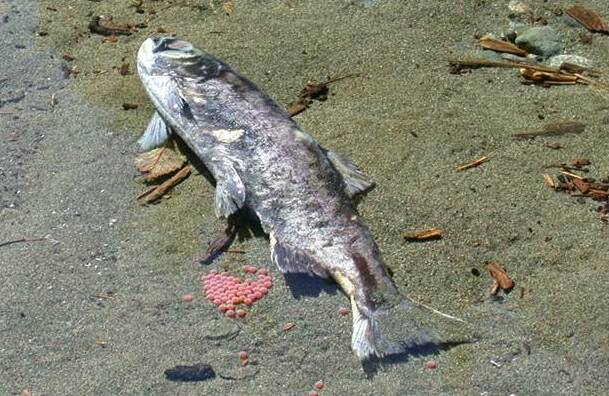
Dead salmon and eggs

The salmon runs provided a valuable food source for many animals, such as black bear, coyotes, gray wolves, bald eagles, raccoons, and dozens of others. In addition, salmon carcasses littered stream banks during prime fall and spring spawning, providing food for scavengers and decaying and enriching the soil. In the Elwha River basin, salmon once contributed over 300 tons of phosphorus and nitrogen every year, via decaying carcasses and the scat of predators and scavengers. In this way salmon played an important role in the overall health of the ecosystem. About 130 species benefit from the nutrients in salmon carcasses.

Today, about 83% of the Elwha River's watershed lies within Olympic National Park, where it is protected, more than that of any other river on the Olympic Peninsula. Most of the Elwha's basin is in pristine condition, unlike many other rivers on the peninsula whose basins have been harmed by extensive land use, especially logging. Above the dams, the Elwha's basin remains largely in a natural condition. Limited development has occurred downriver from the park boundary. Water is withdrawn for municipal and industrial use and there is some logging.

== The dams ==
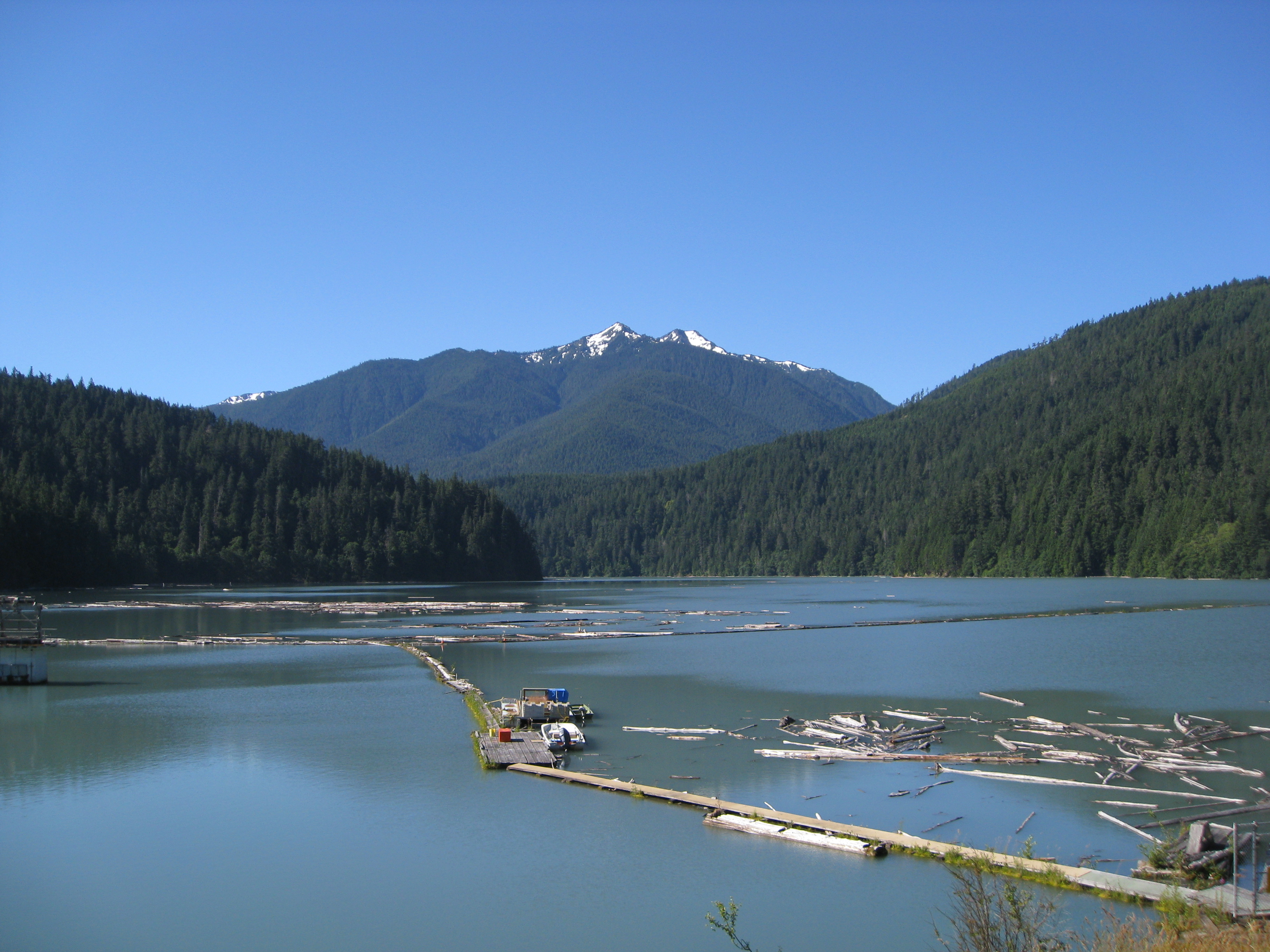
Lake Mills

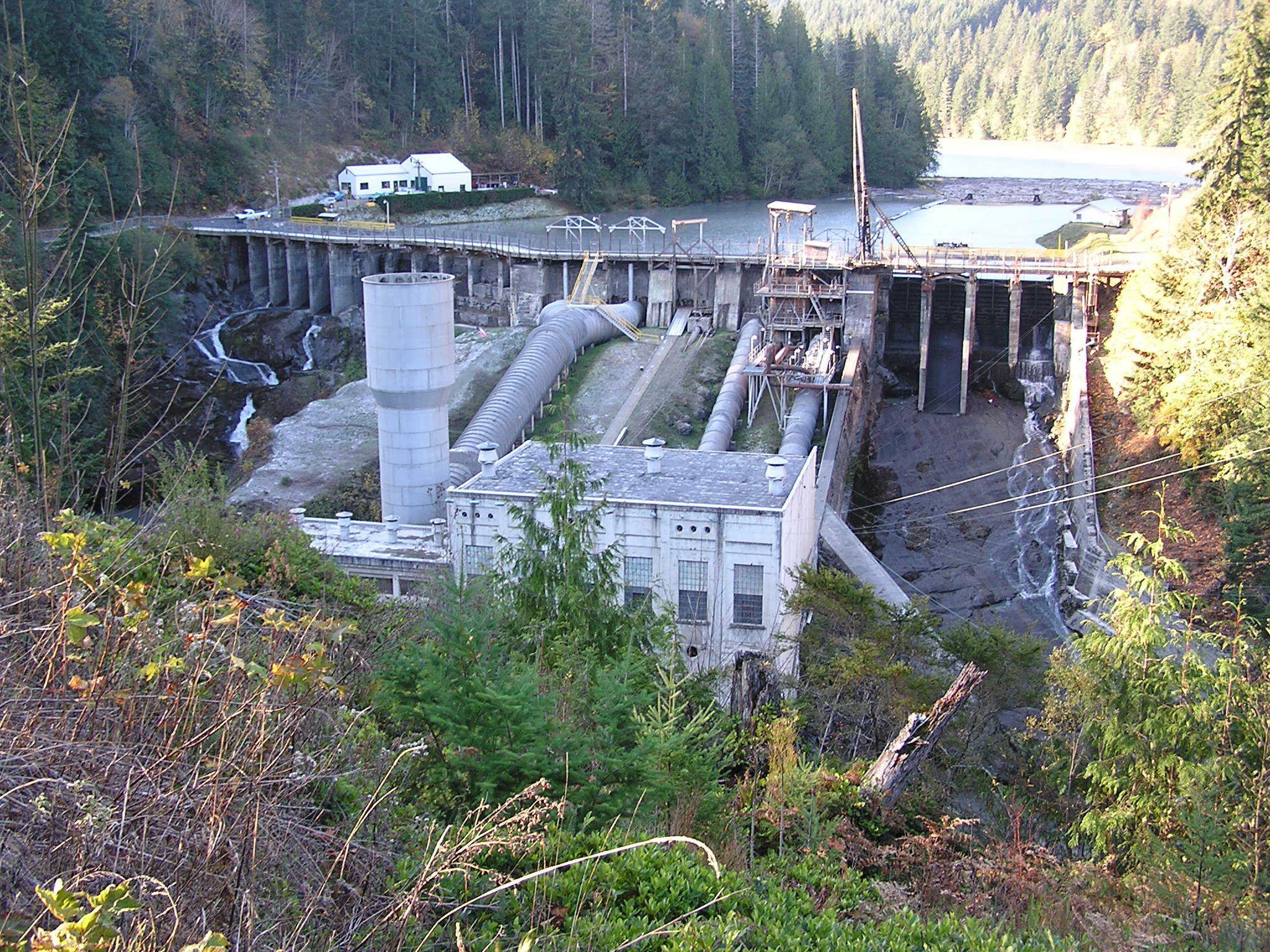
108-ft Elwha Dam

The primary goal of this project was the removal of the 108 ft (33 m) Elwha Dam and the 210 ft (64 m) Glines Canyon Dam from the Elwha River on the Olympic Peninsula of Washington state. Elwha Dam was built privately from 1910 to 1912 by Thomas Aldwell, who owned land in the area. This resulted in blocking passage of migrating fish, limiting them to the lower 4.9 miles (7.9 km) of river below the dam. In 1927 Glines Canyon Dam was built 7 miles (11 km) upriver of Elwha Dam.

Olympic National Park was established by the federal government in 1938 during the Great Depression. In 1940, the park's boundaries were expanded to include Glines Canyon Dam and its reservoir of Lake Mills. The presence and operation of the dam was inconsistent with National Park Service policies to "restore natural aquatic habitats and the natural abundance and distribution of native aquatic species, including fish, together with the associated terrestrial habitats and species," and with Olympic National Park objectives to "conserve, maintain, and restore, where possible, the primary natural resources of the park and those ecological relationships and processes that would prevail were it not for the advent of modern civilization."

The national park, tasked with preserving natural ecosystems, had a man-made system within its boundaries that was known to disrupt major portions of the ecology.

When Elwha Dam was built, it was secured to the walls of the bedrock canyon, but not to the bedrock underlying the river substrate. In 1912, shortly after the reservoir (Lake Aldwell) filled, pressure at the base of the dam built up so much that the foundation of the dam blew out. The void under the dam was plugged by adding fill material to the river below and upstream of the dam. Elwha Dam became operational in 1913. Because of this and other reasons, this dam did not receive a federal license to operate.

An 1890 Washington State law required fish passage devices to be built on dams "wherever food fish are wont to ascend". Thomas Aldwell ignored this requirement. Fish Commissioner Leslie Darwin offered to waive that requirement if Aldwell built a fish hatchery adjoining Elwha Dam. Although Aldwell initially balked at this proposal, he did build a fish hatchery that began operation in 1915. The hatchery was a fiasco. Its managers were unable to successfully rear fish. It was closed in 1922.

== Sediment load ==
With the Glines Canyon Dam blocking sediment from reaching the Strait of Juan de Fuca for more than 80 years, most of it had been accumulating in Lake Mills. Prior to dam construction, the sediment from the Elwha River accumulated at the mouth of the river, expanding the delta and forming extensive sandy beaches. East-flowing currents would transport much of that sediment toward the bluffs of Port Angeles and onto Ediz Hook. However, since the sediment had been accumulating in Lake Mills, wave action and currents had eroded the beaches until they became little more than rocky or pebbly slopes. The mouth of the river had eroded by several acres over the years, shrinking the size of the Lower Elwha Klallam reservation and eliminating their once abundant clam beds.

Ediz Hook has eroded to the point that rip-rap has to be placed on the feature to protect Port Angeles harbor from the effects of the wave action. The United States Army Corps of Engineers spends approximately $100,000 annually to control erosion of Ediz Hook and estimates the Elwha River contributed between 50,000 and 80,000 cubic yards of sediment per year before the dams were built. The dammed river contributed a negligible volume of sediment to Ediz Hook.

== The decision to remove the dams ==
The combined power output the dams generated was approximately 19 mega-watt hours annually, a figure roughly equivalent to 38% of the electricity necessary to operate the Nippon Paper mill in Port Angeles. Other power sources in the regional grid supplied a much greater proportion of the area's electricity. The dams blocked and nearly eliminated the once enormous runs of salmon in the river and their nutrients into Olympic National Park. The sediment was no longer making it to the sea, resulting in erosion problems on the shore. Although the Elwha Dam was nearly a century old, it had never been secured to the bedrock, resulting in a potential danger of dam failure and a resultant flooding of downstream communities.

The Lower Elwha Klallam Tribe had sought the removal of the two dams since they were built. In 1968 the owner of the dams, Crown Zellerbach Corporation, applied to the Federal Energy Regulatory Commission (FERC) for a license for Elwha Dam, and in 1973 applied to renew the license for Glines Canyon Dam. By this time, the treaty fishing rights of the Pacific Northwest tribes had been recognized in the 1979 Boldt Decision, and the Lower Elwha Klallam Tribe pressed for removal of the dams to restore salmon runs to the Elwha River. The Tribe opposed both applications by Crown Zellerbach, intervening before the FERC. The environmental community also got involved in opposing the dams. By the 1980s twelve conservation groups opposed the relicensing process, including Olympic Park Associates, Seattle Audubon Society, Sierra Club, Friends of the Earth, and American Rivers.

A series of political battles occurred locally and in Washington, D.C., particularly with Senator Slade Gorton blocking the project, while Senator Brock Adams strongly supported the removal plan. Final congressional approval of the dam removal project was expressed in the Elwha River Ecosystem and Fisheries Restoration Act of 1992, which authorized the Secretary of the Interior to acquire and remove two dams on the river and restore the ecosystem and native anadromous fisheries. However, Senator Gorton continued to block and delay the process. By 2000 Gorton retreated, allowing the dams to be purchased by the federal government in order to arrange for removal.

In 1987 the dams and all other assets of Crown Zellerbach were acquired by the James River Corporation, which owned the dams until 2000. Concerned that it might someday be required to remove the dams and pay for river restoration, the corporation sought to transfer the dams to the federal government. In February 2000, the government bought the dams and related facilities for $29.5 million. Until removal, the dams had been operated by the Bureau of Reclamation, with National Park Service oversight. When the federal government purchased the dams in 2000, it freed the James River Corporation from any further liability related to the damage caused by the dams in the past or potentially in the future.

== Dam removal and river restoration ==
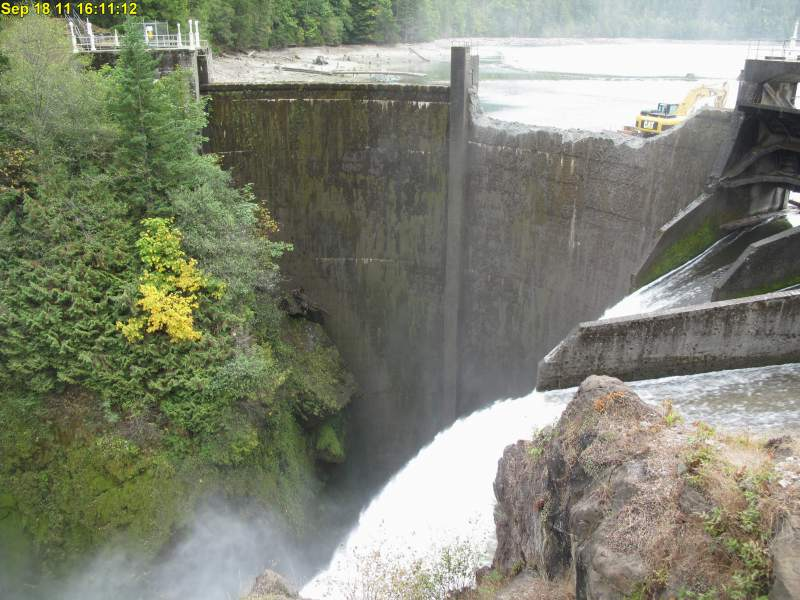
The first chunk taken out of the Glines Canyon Dam

After the 1992 Elwha River Ecosystem and Fisheries Restoration Act was passed, a number of alternatives for restoration were explored by the Department of the Interior. The Final Programmatic EIS (environmental impact statement), released in June 1995, concluded that the only way to fully restore the river was to remove both dams. The Final Implementation EIS, released in November 1996, concluded that sediment that had accumulated in the two reservoirs should be allowed to erode and disperse naturally downstream.

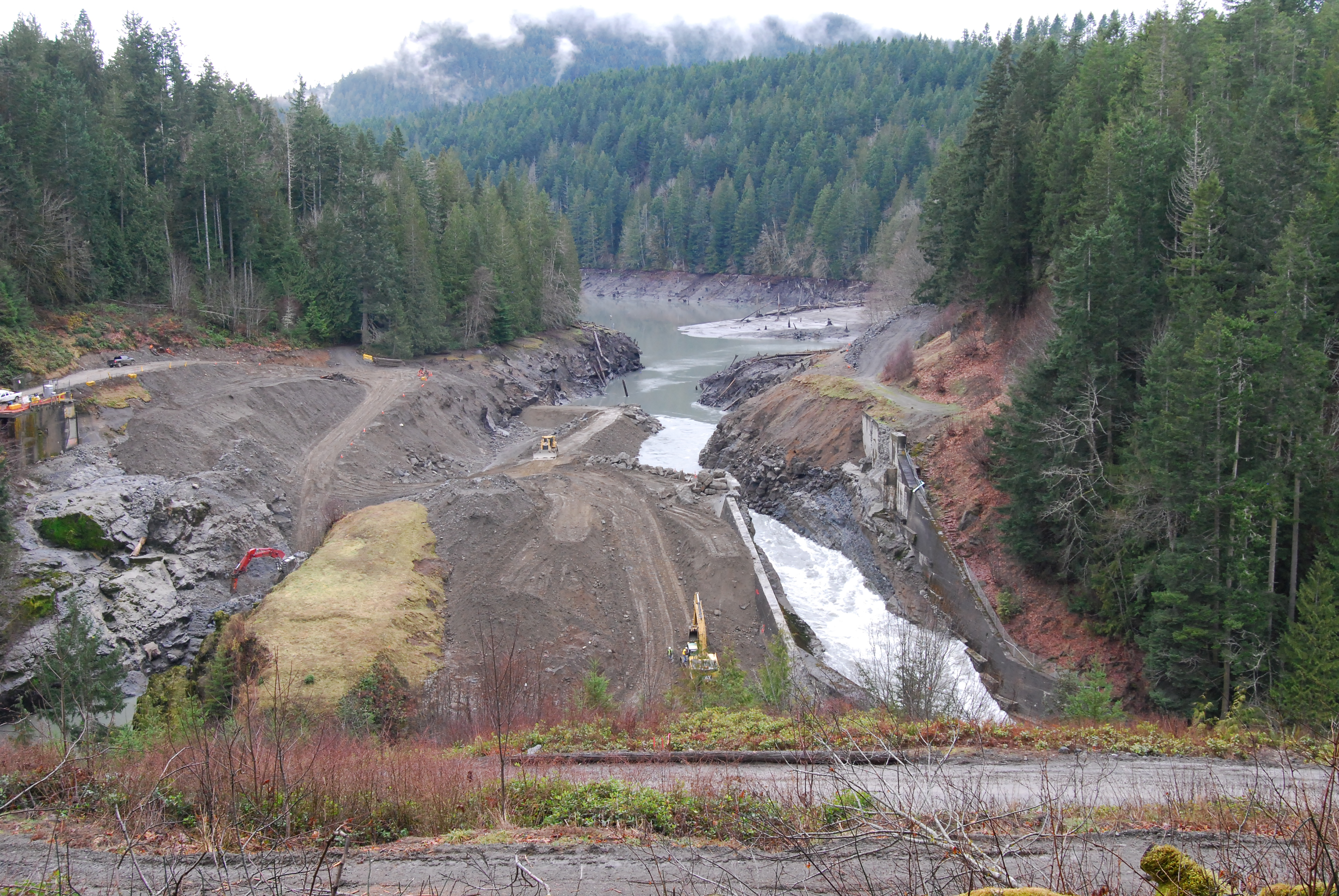
What remained of the Elwha Dam as of February 14, 2012

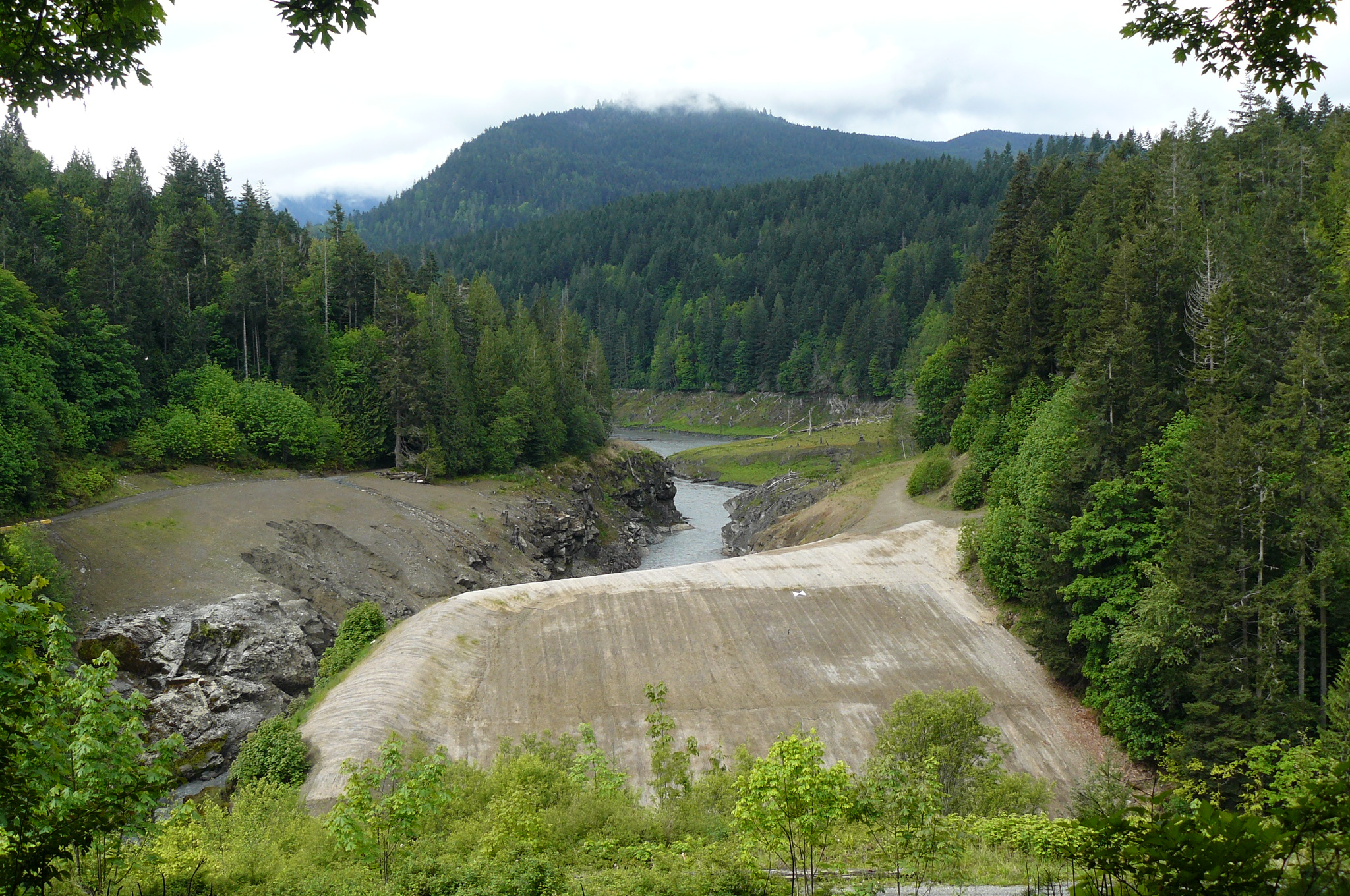
Elwha Dam removal finished (May 2013)

Removal of the Elwha Dam began in September 2011 and was finished in spring 2012, ahead of schedule. Removal of the second dam, the Glines Canyon Dam, was completed on August 26, 2014. The dam removal process was originally projected to last two and a half to three years. The estimated cost of removing both dams was $40 to $60 million. The total cost of the Elwha River restoration is approximately $351.4 million. This price includes the purchase of the two dams and related facilities, construction of two water treatment plants and other facilities to protect water users, and construction of flood protection facilities, a fish hatchery, and a greenhouse for growing native plants for revegetation.

The draining of the reservoir has revealed a ceremonial creation ground of the Lower Elwha Klallam Tribe; it had been submerged since the early 20th century. This has been profoundly welcomed by the tribe, which has planned events to restore the sacred space.

After the removal of the dams, 10.5 million metric tons of sediment was released from two reservoirs through the Elwha river system. The sudden increase of sediment supply caused bed aggradation of ~1 meter, resulting in a change of channel morphology from pool-riffle to braided, and decreased the slope of the lowermost river. Widespread bed aggradation forced flow through floodplain channels, depositing additional sediment in the side channels of the Elwha river floodplain. Mainstream aggradation also formed numerous bars, further establishing braided morphology. The river system showed a greater geomorphic response to dam removal than it had to a 40-year flood event four years before dam removal. The dams had virtually eliminated bed-material sediment supply to the river downstream, forming large deltas upstream of each reservoir. Once released, the sediment travelled downstream to the mouth of the river, where a new estuary is believed to be forming. These geomorphic alterations have important ecological implications, affecting aquatic habitat structure, benthic fauna, salmonid spawning and rearing potential, and riparian vegetation. The process of hydrochory after dam removal has increased the distribution of seeds downstream, allowing for the dispersal of seeds that were previously blocked off. This has restored hydrochory on the river and the return of riparian vegetation downstream. Actively restored sites and recolonized sites have not developed significant populations of invasive species. The response of the Elwha River system to the dam removals provides a unique and important case study for future river restoration projects.

=== Salmon Restoration ===
The restoration of anadromous and migratory fish populations connectivity and habitat are primary goals of the restoration project. Anadromous and migratory fishes previously lost 90% of their habitat due to the dams. After dam removal, eight anadromous species swiftly ascended upstream into areas previously impeded, restoring connectivity, permitting the return of fish upstream and increasing their spatial distribution and density.

Coho Salmon after a century long absence is reproducing and rearing in the section that was occupied by the Elwha and Glines Canyon Dams. Recolonization efforts through relocation of adults to the Little River and Indian Creek tributaries from hatcheries has established levels of spawning and juvenile production comparable to other Coho Salmon populations in the Pacific Northwest.

== Partnerships, research, and education ==
The partnership includes the National Park Service, the Bureau of Reclamation, and the Lower Elwha Klallam Tribe, in addition to local and state governments and outside public interest groups. As the largest project ever of its kind, it presents huge research opportunities. These are being pursued by students and professors at Peninsula College, Eastern Washington University, and Western Washington University, as well as professors from many other universities.

The National Park Service and Olympic Park Institute are involved in education projects to inform the public about the history of the river, the dam removal process, ecosystem restoration, and the return of salmon to the upper river.

The restoration partnership has supported Indigenous survival and collective continuance; however, many desired goals of the Lower Elwha Klallam Tribe have not been achieved. The Lower Elwha Klallam Tribe is concerned with the dispossession of lands and river access.

Tribal, Federal, State, research, and community groups hosted the 10th-year anniversary of dam removal with the 2022 Elwha River “ScienceScape” symposium to review the first decade of partnership and restoration, and plan ahead for the next decade of monitoring.

== Media ==
The Elwha River and the Elwha Ecosystem Restoration Project were the basis for the 2018 documentary, The Memory of Fish. It is the story of Dick Goin's 30-year fight for the removal of the Elwha River Dam for the return of salmon to the Elwha River.

== See also ==
- Cuddebackville Dam
