= Indian Creek (Elwha River tributary) =

Coordinates: 48°04′01″N 123°34′56″W

Physical characteristics
- Source: Lake Sutherland
- Length: 5.65 miles (9.09 km)

Basin features
- River system: Elwha River

Indian Creek is a tributary of the Elwha River located in Clallam County, Washington in the United States. It flows from Lake Sutherland into the former Lake Aldwell and has a total length of 5.65 miles (9.09 km).

== History ==
Historically, Indian Creek supported runs of several anadromous salmon and trout species, including all five species of Pacific Salmon. However, with construction of the Elwha Dam in 1913, fish were blocked from accessing the Pacific Ocean.

While the Elwha Dam was in operation, Indian Creek sustained populations of kokanee sockeye salmon, which spawned in Lake Sutherland and migrated to Lake Aldwell to use as their ocean. It also contained stream resident coastal rainbow trout, coastal cutthroat trout, and introduced eastern brook trout.

With the removal of the Elwha Dam in 2012, the native salmonids began a return to their anadromous lifestyle, with spawning activities of true anadromous Chinook salmon observed in late 2013.

=== Oil spill ===
Approximate location of the crash

On July 18, 2025, a fuel tanker truck crash on U.S. Route 101 spilled approximately 3,000 US gallons (11,000 L; 2,500 imp gal) of gasoline and diesel fuels into the creek. The accident happened between highway mileposts 237 and 238 at approximately 10:20 a.m. local time and prompted a multi-agency response; the City of Port Angeles disabled Elwha River water intake, recommended conserving water resources, and issued a brief Do Not Drink order to tap water utility customers while testing was completed. Washington State Governor Bob Ferguson, U.S. Representative Emily Randall, Ecology Director Casey Sixkiller and other officials visited the site on July 20.

Thousands of fish are estimated to have been killed initially, including sculpin, lamprey, crawfish, coho, Chinook salmon, steelhead, bull and rainbow trout.

== See also ==
- List of rivers of Washington (state)
