= Newark Reservoir =

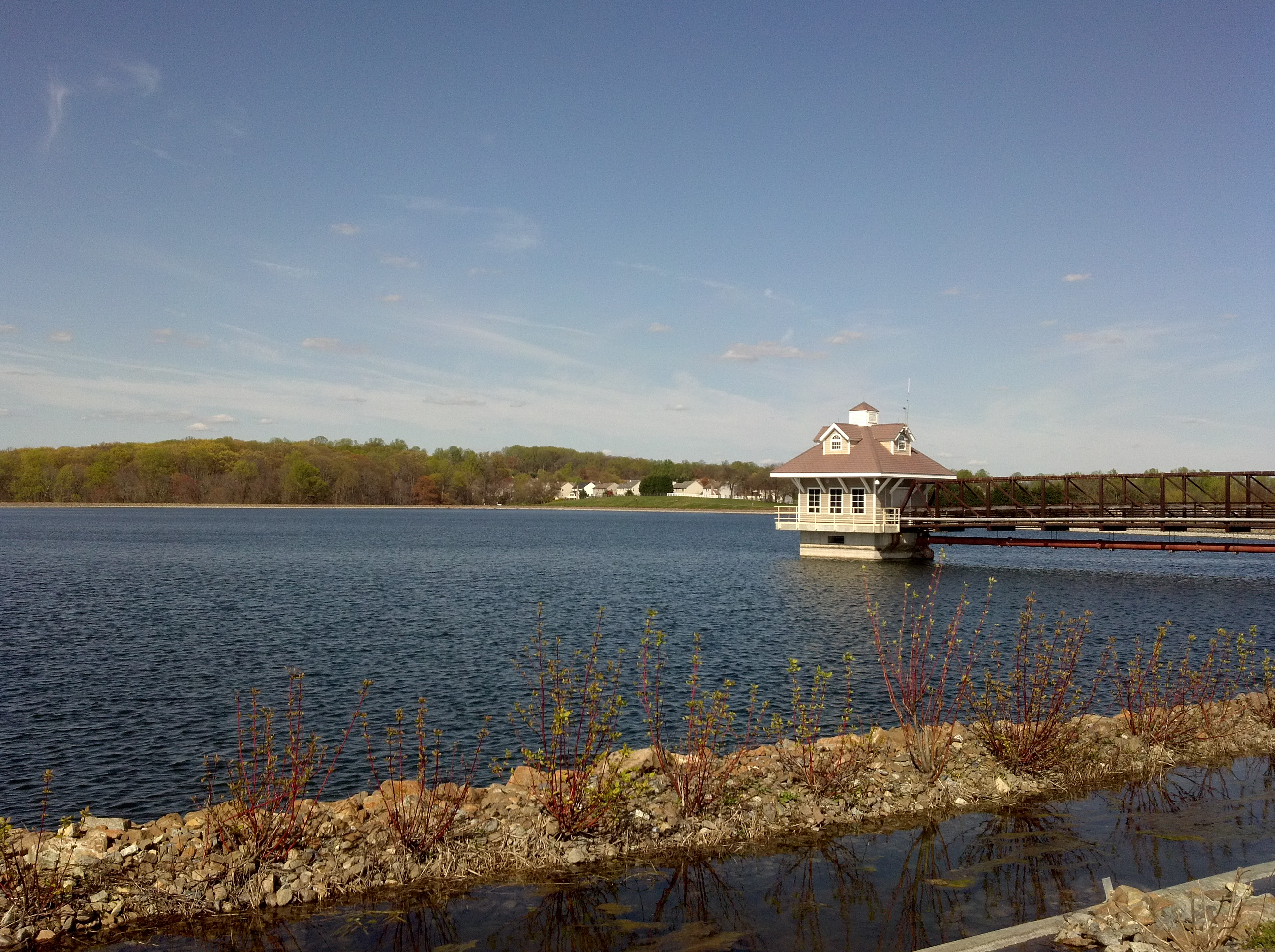

- Location within Delaware Location within the United States
- Location: New Castle County, Delaware
- Coordinates: 39°41′44″N 75°44′38″W
- Type: reservoir
- Primary inflows: White Clay Creek
- Primary outflows: White Clay Creek
- Basin countries: United States
- Surface area: 30 acres (12 ha)
- Max. depth: 56 feet (17 m)
- Water volume: 317 million U.S. gallons (1.20×10^{9} L)
- Shore length^{1}: 1.5 mi (2.4 km)
- ^{1} Shore length is not a well-defined measure.

The Newark Reservoir is a reservoir in Newark, Delaware, located just north of downtown. Completed in 2006, it holds 317 million U.S. gallons (1.20×10^{9} L) of water pumped from White Clay Creek, which can supply the city for up to 100 days. The site is a popular recreational area with 1.8 miles (2.9 km) of paved walking trails, including a 1.1-mile (1.8 km) trail around the reservoir perimeter. At the north end there is also access to the adjacent William M. Redd, Jr. Park.

The reservoir was constructed between 2002 and 2005 after a major drought in 1999 made the need for a reserve water supply clear. The city chose a site on the Koelig farm property off Paper Mill Road, and ground was broken there on May 14, 2002. The completed reservoir was ready to be filled by November 2005, and the new facility was formally dedicated on May 24, 2006. The project cost $20 million in total. It was the first new reservoir to be constructed in Delaware since the Hoopes Reservoir in Wilmington, which was completed in 1932.

Aquatic activities are prohibited except during special events, like an annual triathlon that gives competitors the chance to swim in the reservoir. The swimming portion of the 2017 triathlon was canceled due to a cyanobacterial bloom.
