= Thomas Aldwell =

Canadian entrepreneur (1868 - 1954)

Thomas Aldwell (14 June 1868 – 1954) was a Canadian entrepreneur and businessman who developed and gained financing for a project to build the Elwha Dam on the Elwha River in Washington state, approximately 4.9 miles upstream from the mouth of the river at the Strait of Juan de Fuca.

Working at a variety of jobs in the frontier town of Port Angeles, he quietly bought land at his proposed site of the dam. With a partner he founded the Olympic Power and Development Company to gather commitments from potential users for the power he would generate. Construction began in 1910 and the dam was completed in 1913. Its reservoir of Lake Aldwell was named after him. Later the Glines Canyon Dam was built several miles upriver by other private interests to generate more electricity for the northern Olympic Peninsula.

== Biography ==
Thomas Theobald Aldwell was born in Toronto, Ontario, in Canada on June 14, 1868 to a family of Scots ancestry. After completing local schools, he first trained as a banker but yearned for more.

At the age of 22, he went to Port Angeles, Washington on the Olympic Peninsula in 1890 looking for adventure and opportunity. The lumbering industry was expanding in the region. For some time he worked a variety of jobs in the rough frontier town, while slowly buying bottom land along the Elwha River. He believed it was a prime location for a dam to generate power for the industries he was sure would be developed in Port Angeles and other towns along the coast. Aldwell acquired as a partner George Glines, a wealthy real estate man from Winnipeg.

Trying to gain financing for the dam, Aldwell and Glines founded the Olympic Power and Development Company, in order to gain commitments from potential customers. They persuaded prominent men to join its board of directors, including R.D. Merrill, who owned Merrill & Ring, and Michael Earles, "a timber baron" who would own the “Big Mill” in Port Angeles. Aldwell appealed to local governments as well as United States military installations to gain their commitments as customers: the city of Port Angeles, Citizens Electric Co. of Port Townsend, nearby Army forts Worden and Flagler, and the Bremerton Navy Yard, located south on the Olympic Peninsula.

They gained financing from a firm in Chicago, which insisted on choosing the engineering firm for the project. Aldwell said the experience taught him not to take on responsibility without control; the engineering firm failed to secure the dam to the bedrock below the river. There was a failure at the bottom of the dam that required expensive repairs before operations could start.
