= Glines Canyon Dam =

Dam on the Elwha River, Washington, US

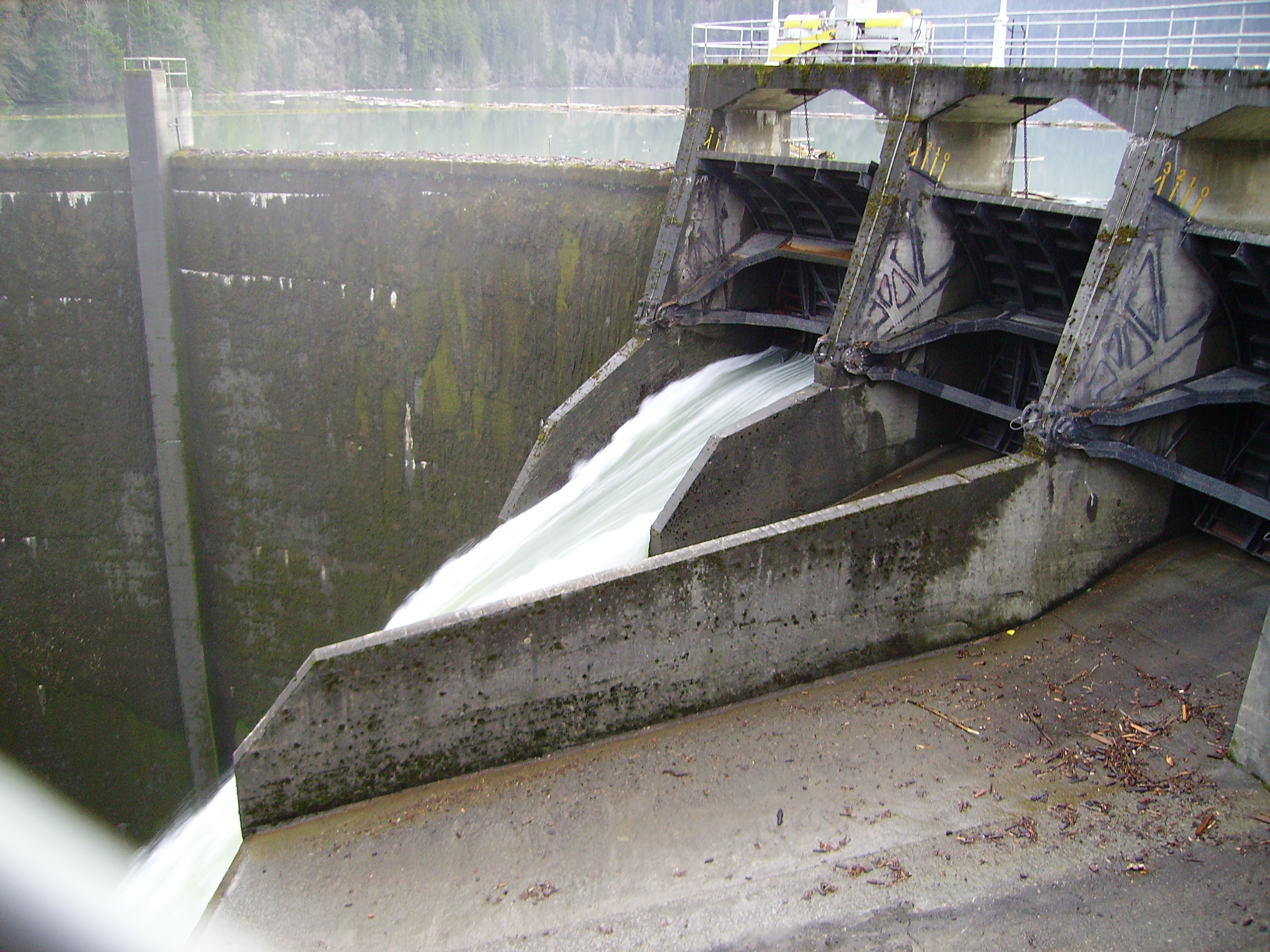
- Glines Canyon Dam

- Location within Washington (state) Location within the United States
- Location: On Elwha River, along Olympic Hot Springs Road, about 11 miles (18 km) southwest of Port Angeles, in Olympic National Park, Clallam County, Washington, USA
- Coordinates: 48°00′07″N 123°36′00″W
- Construction began: 1925
- Opening date: 1927
- Demolition date: 2014
- Built by: Thebo, Starr, & Anderson Inc.
- Designed by: P.M. Thebo; W.B. McMillan; W.A. Whitmire; H.R. Stevens; H. Schorer

Dam and spillways
- Impounds: Elwha River
- Height: 210 ft (64 m)

Reservoir
- Creates: Lake Mills
- Total capacity: 40,500 acre⋅ft (50,000,000 m^{3})
- Surface area: 415 acres (168 ha)

Power Station
- Installed capacity: 13.3 MW
- Glines Canyon Hydroelectric Power Plant
- U.S. National Register of Historic Places
- U.S. Historic district
- Area: 7 acres (2.8 ha)
- Architectural style: Classical Revival
- MPS: Hydroelectric Power Plants in Washington State, 1890--1938 MPS
- NRHP reference No.: 88002742
- Added to NRHP: December 15, 1988

Glines Canyon Dam, also known as Upper Elwha Dam, was a 210-foot (64 m) tall concrete arch dam that impounded Lake Mills reservoir on the Elwha River in Clallam County, Washington. As of 2025, it is the tallest dam ever to be intentionally breached.

Built in 1927, Glines Canyon Dam was located 13 miles (21 km) upriver from the mouth of the Elwha River at the Strait of Juan de Fuca, and about 8 miles (13 km) upriver from Elwha Dam. Both dams lay within Olympic National Park, established in 1938. The National Park Service demolished Glines Canyon Dam in 2014 as part of the restoration of the Elwha River (Elwha Dam was demolished in 2011–2012). The project was the largest dam removal in history until the restoration of the lower Klamath River in the 2020s.

== History ==
The dam was built privately to generate electricity for industries and major military installations on the Olympic Peninsula, including lumber and paper mills in Port Angeles.

The Glines Canyon Hydroelectric Power Plant historic district, a 7 acres (2.8 ha) area comprising the dam, the powerhouse, and the water conveying system, was listed on the National Register of Historic Places in 1988.

== Effects of dam on river habitat and area ecology ==
Lacking passage for migrating salmon, Glines Canyon Dam blocked access by anadromous salmonids to the upper 38 miles (61 km) of mainstem habitat and more than 30 miles (48 km) of tributary habitat. The Elwha River watershed once supported salmon runs of more than 400,000 adult returns on more than 70 miles (110 km) of river habitat. By the early 21st-century, fewer than 4,000 adult salmon returned each year.

== Habitat restoration ==
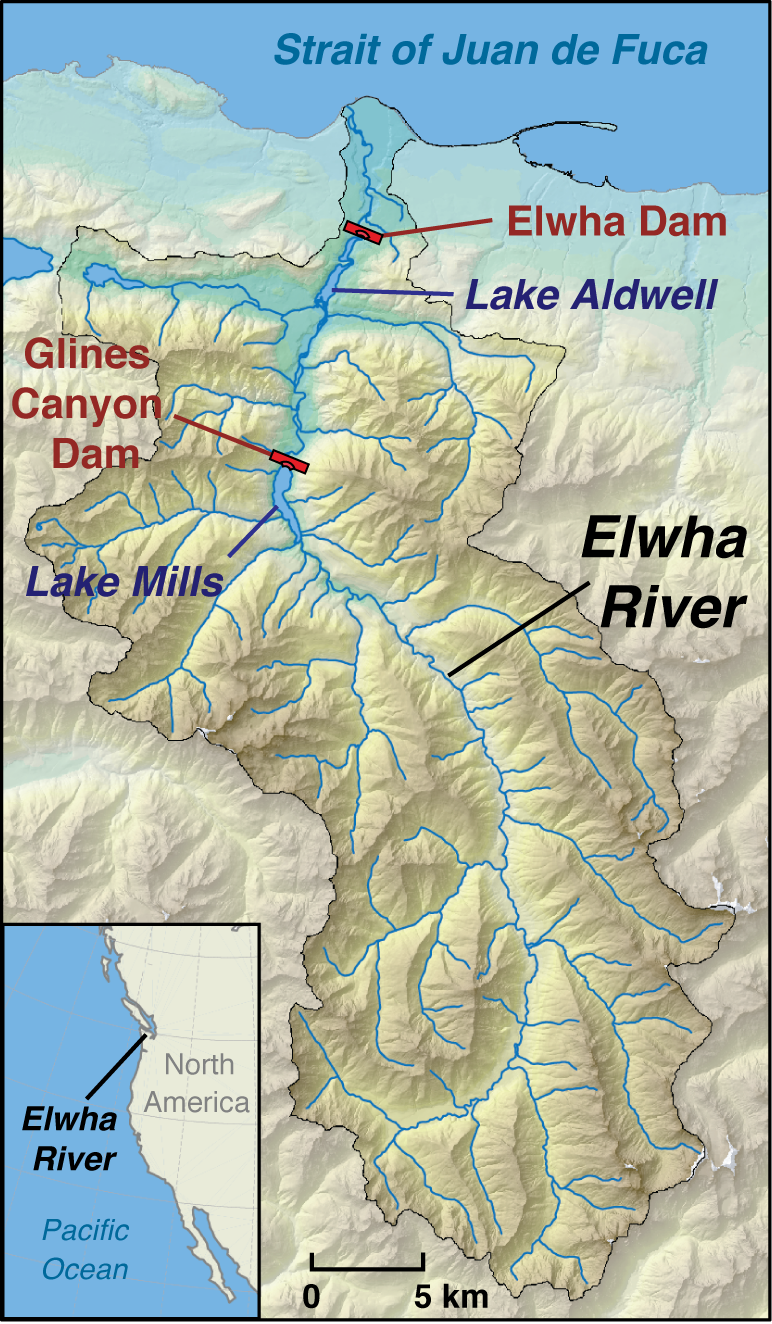
Map of Elwha River and dam locations

Numerous groups lobbied Congress to remove the two dams on the river and restore the habitat of the river and its valley. The Elwha River Ecosystem and Fisheries Restoration Act of 1992 authorized the US Federal Government to acquire the Elwha Dam and Glines Canyon Dam hydroelectric power projects for decommissioning and demolition for habitat restoration.

The Elwha Ecosystem Restoration project started in September 2011 as work to demolish the nearby Elwha Dam began downstream. The final piece of the Glines Canyon Dam was removed August 26, 2014. Now that the dam has been removed, the area that was under Lake Mills is being revegetated and its banks secured to prevent erosion and to speed up ecological restoration.

== Gallery ==
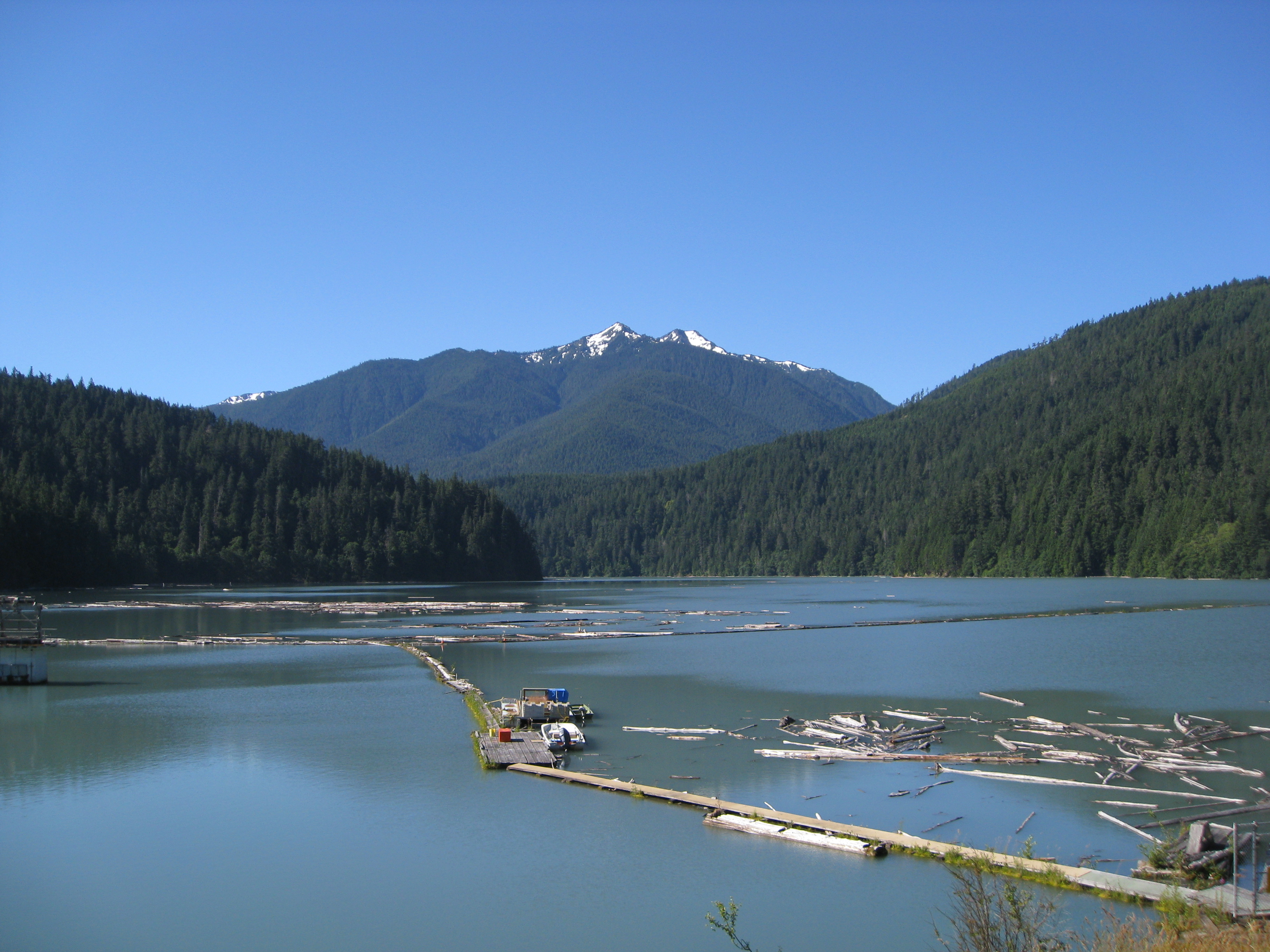

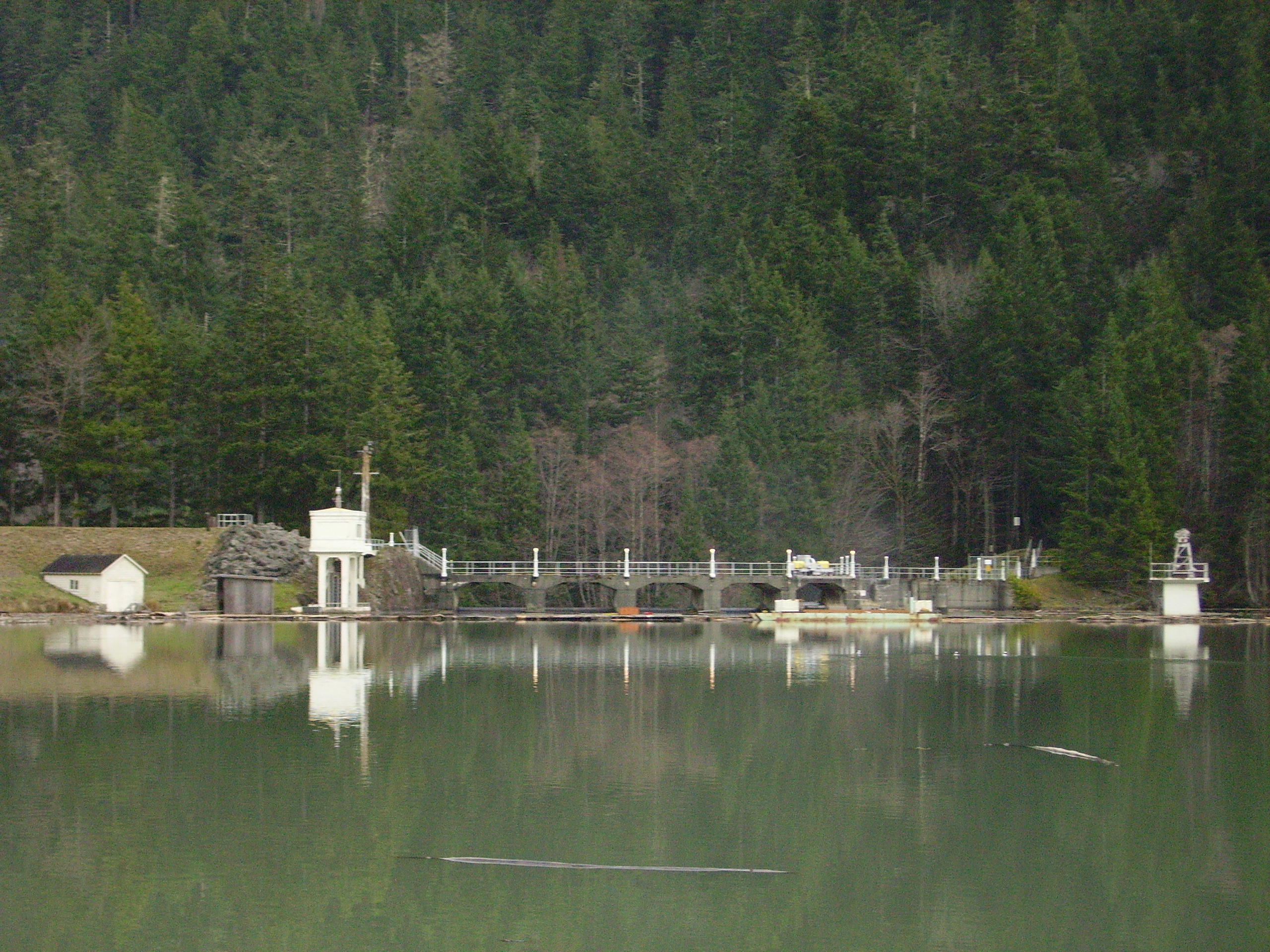

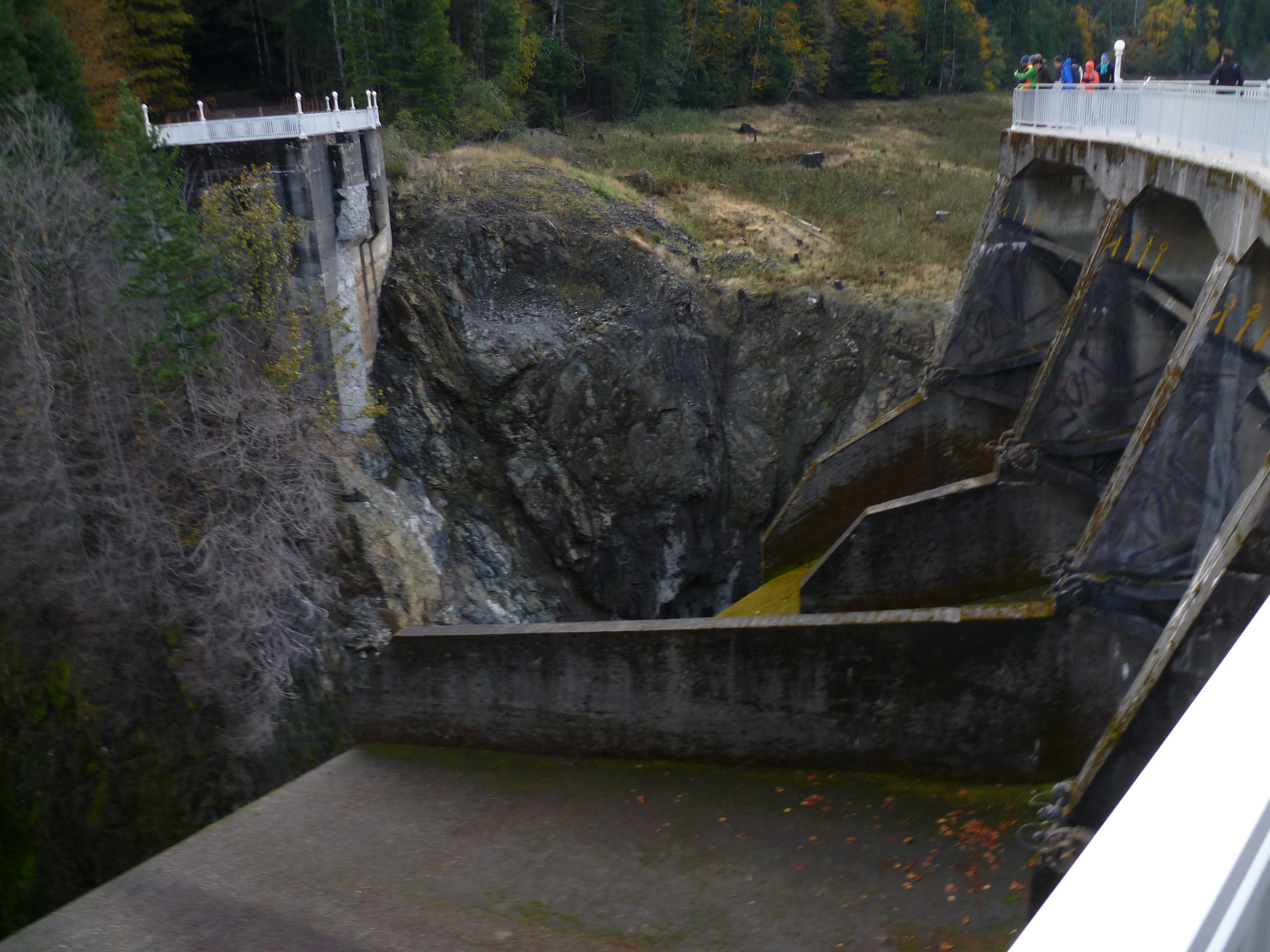
Glines Canyon Dam (removed) from above, Oct 2014

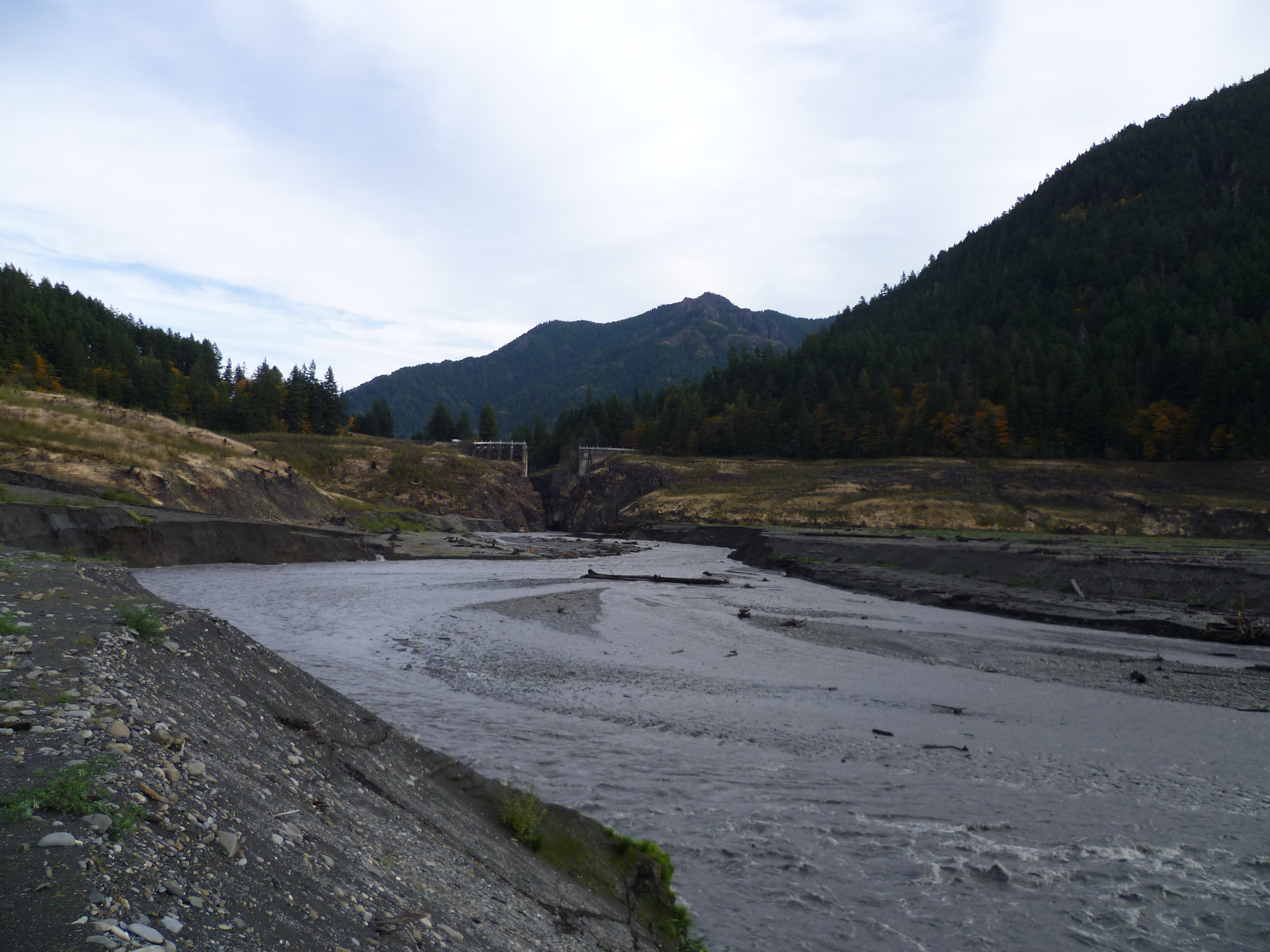
Glines Canyon Dam (removed) from inside reservoir, Oct 2014

== See also ==
- Elwha Dam

== Sources ==
- Grossman, Elizabeth (2002). Watershed: The Undamming of America. Basic Books. ISBN 1-58243-108-6..
- Mapes, Lynda V. (2016). "Elway: Roaring Back to Life," The Seattle Times.
