= Cedar Creek, Delaware =

Unincorporated community in Delaware, United States

- Unincorporated community
- Location within Delaware Location within the United States
- Coordinates: 38.8684°N 75.38035°W
- Country: United States
- State: Delaware
- County: Sussex
- Time zone: UTC-5 (Eastern (EST))
  - Summer (DST): UTC-4 (EDT)
- Area code: 302

Cedar Creek is a collection of developments and residences mainly surrounding Swiggetts Pond and Cubbage Pond along the Cedar Creek in Sussex County, Delaware, United States. It is part of the Salisbury, Maryland-Delaware Metropolitan Statistical Area. The area generally referred to as Cedar Creek follows Fleatown Road from Clendaniel Pond Road to Delaware Route 1, then heads south to Slaughter Neck Road, following Slaughter Neck Road until it connects with Cubbage Pond Road, ending back at the intersection of Cubbage Pond Road and Fleatown Road. The developments include Cedar Creek Estates, Cedar Village, The Meadows on Cubbage Pond, South Shores, The Village at Anderson Crossroads, and Pine Haven Park. Cedar Creek Nature Preserve is also located here off Brick Granary Road where the Cedar Creek flows into Swiggetts Pond.

The area is unincorporated into any town, with the closest towns being Milford to the north and Ellendale to the south.
