= Elwha Dam =

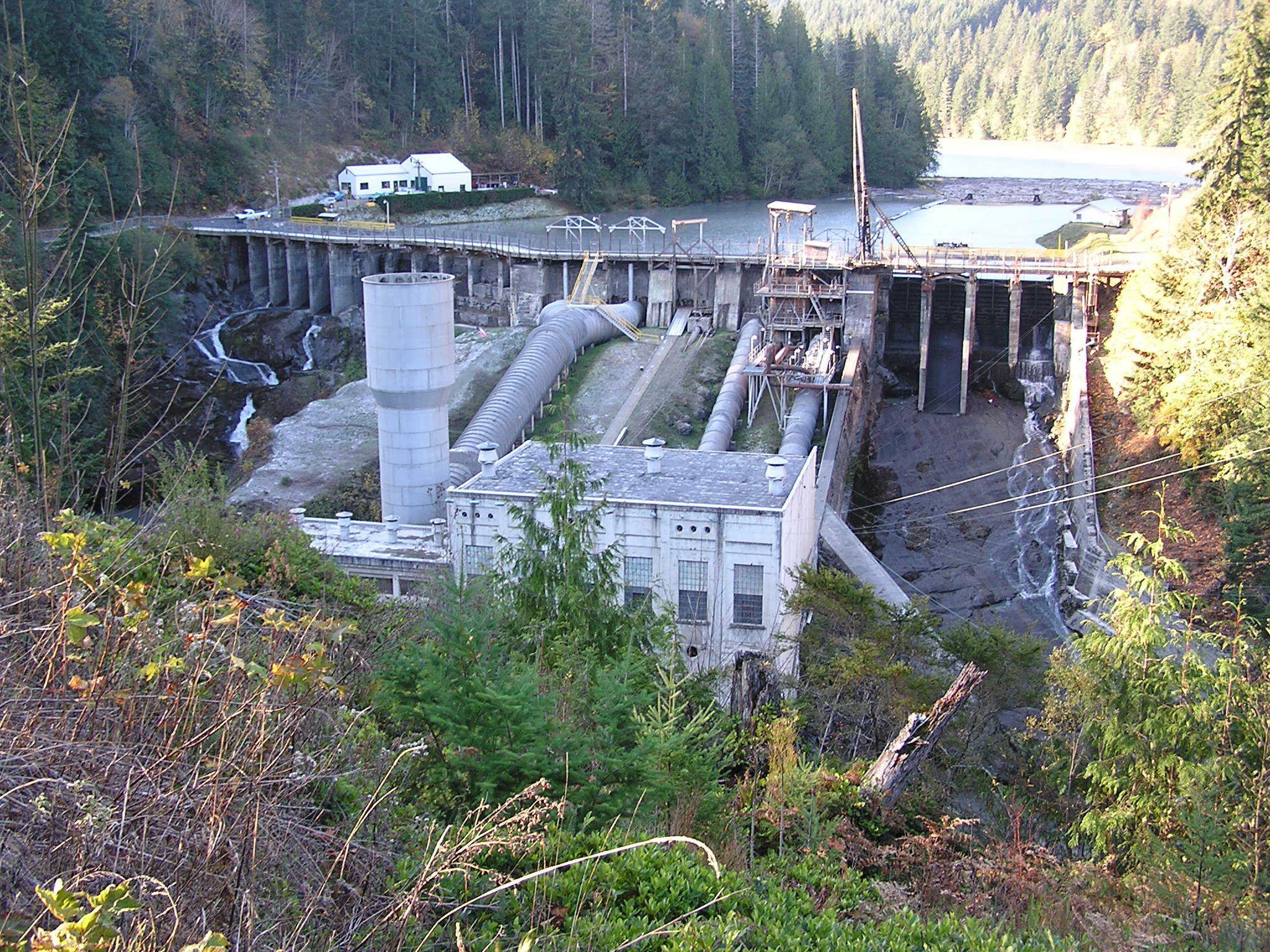
- Elwha Dam in 2005
- Interactive map of Elwha Dam
- Location: Clallam County, Washington, USA
- Construction began: 1910
- Opening date: 1913
- Demolition date: 2012

Dam and spillways
- Impounds: Elwha River
- Height: 105 ft (33 m)

Reservoir
- Creates: Lake Aldwell

Power Station
- Installed capacity: 14.8 MW
- Elwha River Hydroelectric Power Plant
- U.S. National Register of Historic Places
- U.S. Historic district
- Location within Washington (state) Location within the United States
- Location: On Elwha River, end of Lower Dam Road, about 6 miles (9.7 km) southwest of Port Angeles
- Coordinates: 48°05′42″N 123°33′24″W
- Area: 3.5 acres (1.4 ha)
- Built: 1911
- Architect: L.L. Summers & Company
- Architectural style: Concrete gravity dam
- MPS: Hydroelectric Power Plants in Washington State, 1890--1938 MPS
- NRHP reference No.: 88002741
- Added to NRHP: December 15, 1988

The Elwha Dam was a 108-ft (33 m) high dam located in the United States, in the state of Washington, on the Elwha River approximately 4.9 miles (7.9 km) upstream from the mouth of the river on the Strait of Juan de Fuca.

The Elwha River Ecosystem and Fisheries Restoration Act of 1992 authorized the US Federal Government to acquire the Elwha Dam and Glines Canyon Dam hydroelectric power projects for decommissioning and demolition for habitat restoration. Removal of the Elwha Dam began in September 2011 and was fully complete by March 2012, allowing the Elwha River to flow freely through the site.

== Construction ==
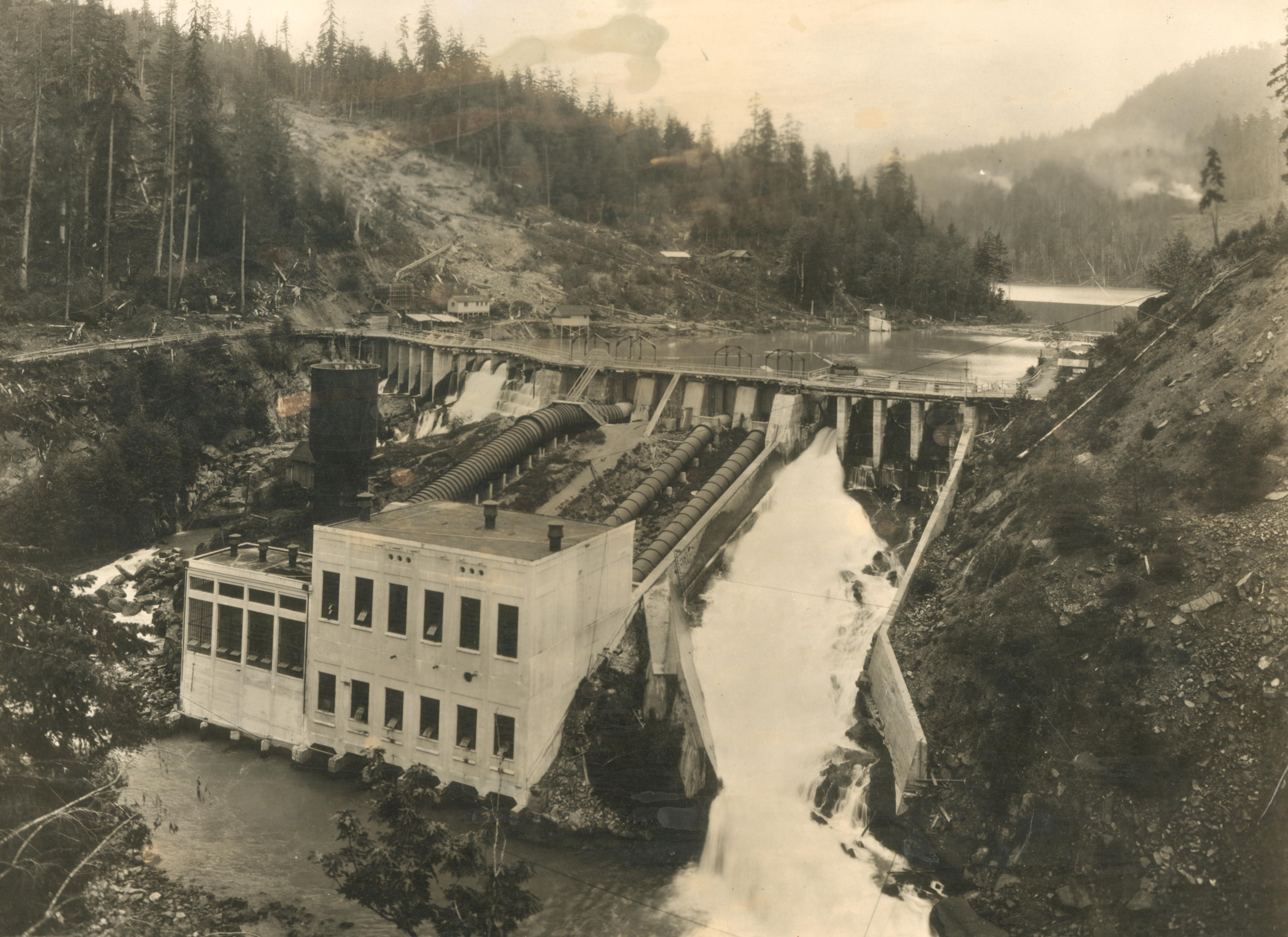
Dam and power house, circa 1913

The dam was built under the direction of Thomas Aldwell. He previously bought up tracts of land around the river, and with the help of Canadian financier George Glines, began construction of the Elwha Dam in 1910. Aldwell and his contractors cut corners on constructing the dam, including illegally not building fish passages and not securing it to the bedrock. Thus, in 1912, as the reservoir filled behind the nearly completed dam, the lower sections of the dam gave way and a torrent of water headed downstream, taking out a bridge. Aldwell was able to get funding for reconstructing the dam and it was completed in 1913. The reservoir that filled the valley behind was known as Lake Aldwell.

The Elwha River Hydroelectric Power Plant historic district, a 3.5 acres (1.4 ha) area comprising the dam, the powerhouse, five penstocks and the surge tank, was listed on the National Register of Historic Places in 1988.

Initially, along with the Glines Canyon Dam, which was completed in 1926, it helped to fuel economic growth and development for the Olympic Peninsula and the community of Port Angeles, Washington. However, by the early 21st century, the combined power output of both dams only provided the equivalent of 38% of the electricity needed to operate one sawmill, the Daishowa America mill.

Lacking passage for migrating salmon, its construction blocked access by anadromous salmonids to the upper 38 miles (48 km) of mainstream habitat and more than 30 miles (48 km) of tributary habitat. The salmon runs that once numbered more than 400,000 adult returns in over 70 miles (110 km) of available habitat, after construction numbered less than 4,000 adult returns on only 4.9 miles (7.9 km) of available habitat.

== Effects of dam on river habitat ==
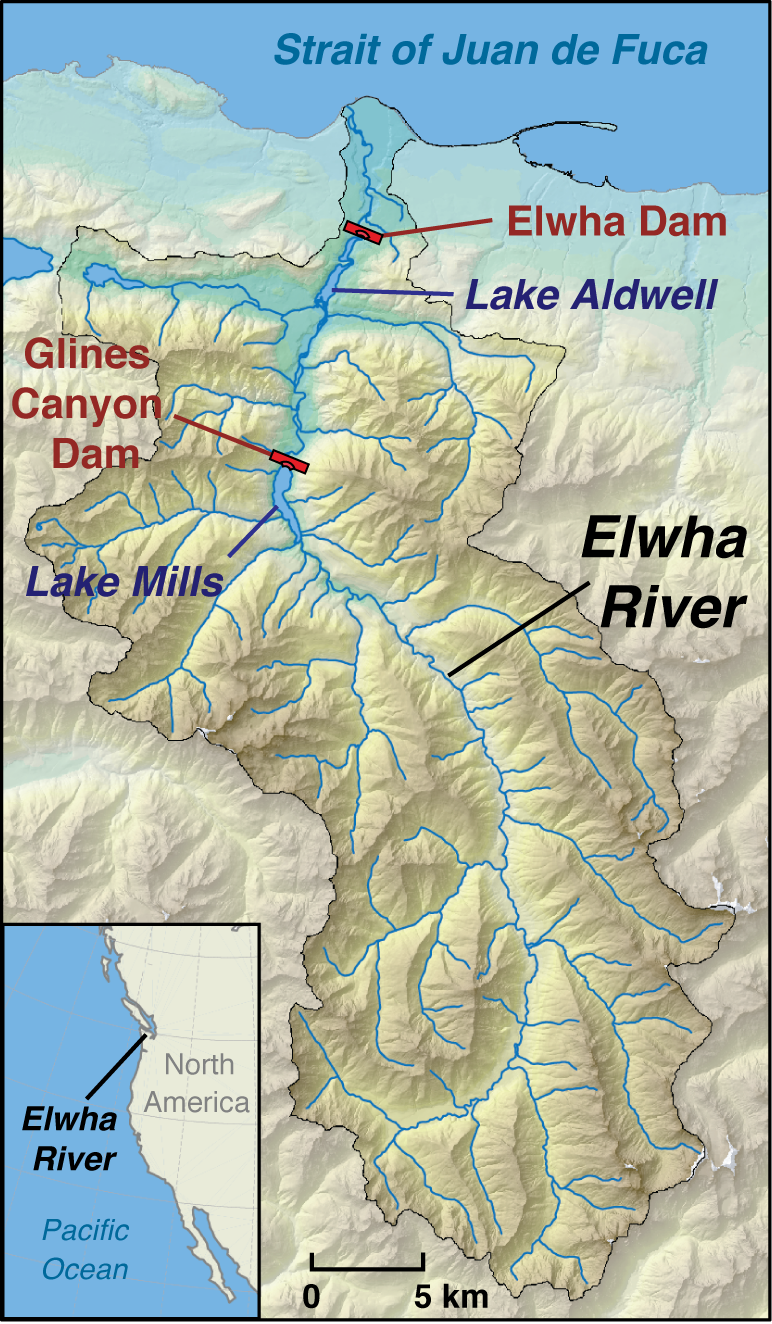
Map of Elwha River and dam locations

After the construction of the dams, the lower reach of the river saw a drastic decrease in sediment delivery. This led to a net erosion of the riverbed, including the gravels needed to create suitable habitats for spawning. Replacement gravel was trapped in the sediment load behind the dams. These gravels are considered an essential resource for restoration of salmon habitats. The delta at the mouth of the river, where it enters the Strait of Juan de Fuca, also saw a net erosion effect, confirmed by local tribal leaders.

Another effect of damming was the creation of Lake Aldwell and Lake Mills. These lakes had a multitude of impacts on the river beyond sediment retention. Because the water stayed in the lake for so long, it warmed up to approximately 16 °C. Normal water temperatures are around 0 °C. These higher temperatures are unnatural for spawning fish, which prefer colder ocean temperature waters. This increase in temperature also increased parasite populations, which threatened salmon runs. In 1992, disease wiped out two thirds of a returning Chinook salmon population before they had a chance to spawn. The lakes also acted as buffers for high and low flow conditions. While the dams were not actively used for flood control, the reservoirs behind them altered the natural flow patterns of the river. The normal seasonal high and low flow were evened out by the reservoirs and dams so that flow was relatively constant throughout the year. Natural flow patterns are known to promote the health of native species and to help eliminate non native species after dam removal.

== History of the Elwha fishery ==
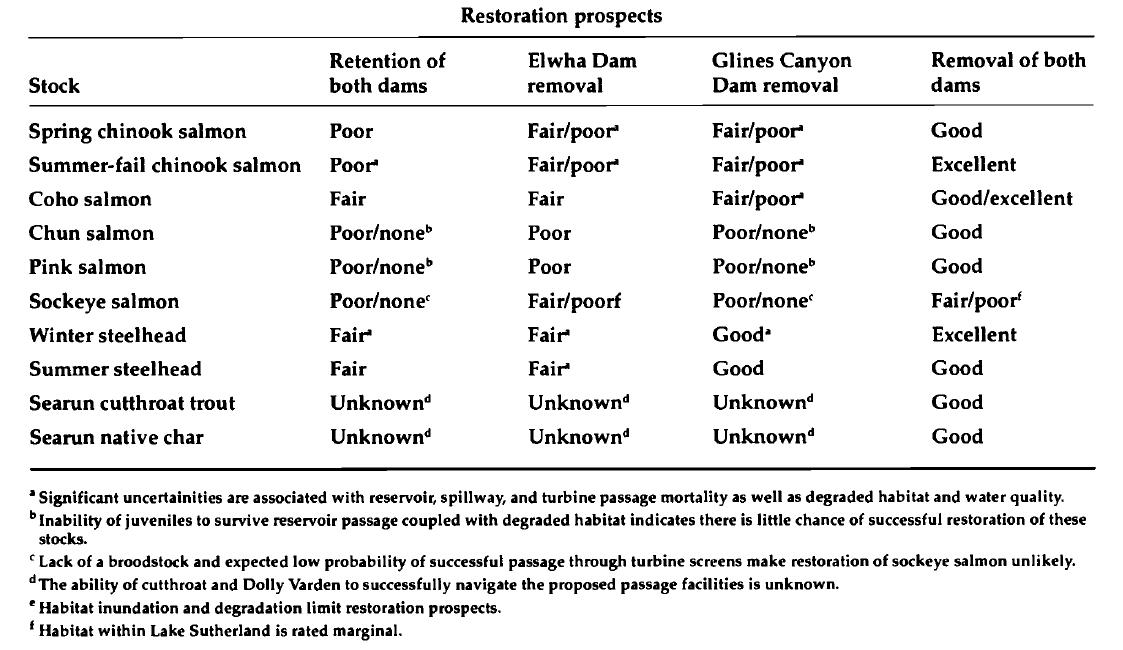
Restoration prospects for various species of fish in the Elwha River. Prospects are presented for the different options and degrees of dam removal or fish bypass plans. Shows that removal of both dams results in the best prospects for all types of fish.

At its peak, the Elwha supported spawning runs of Chinook, coho, chum, pink, and sockeye salmon as well as steelhead, cutthroat, and bull trout. The Chinook were known to reach sizes of 45 kg. Sockeye, Chinook, chum, and pink salmon were all endangered in the Elwha. Leaving one or both of the dams in place, even with modern fish passage systems, would not result in a dramatic recovery of species due to other factors like water temperature and gravel beds, which would still have negative effects on the fish species (see Table 1). The most valuable spawning habitats are located far upstream from the Glines Canyon Dam, so it still acted as a major barrier to the recovery of the runs. Removal of both dams was thus considered the only viable option for full restoration of the river and habitat.

== Dam removal ==
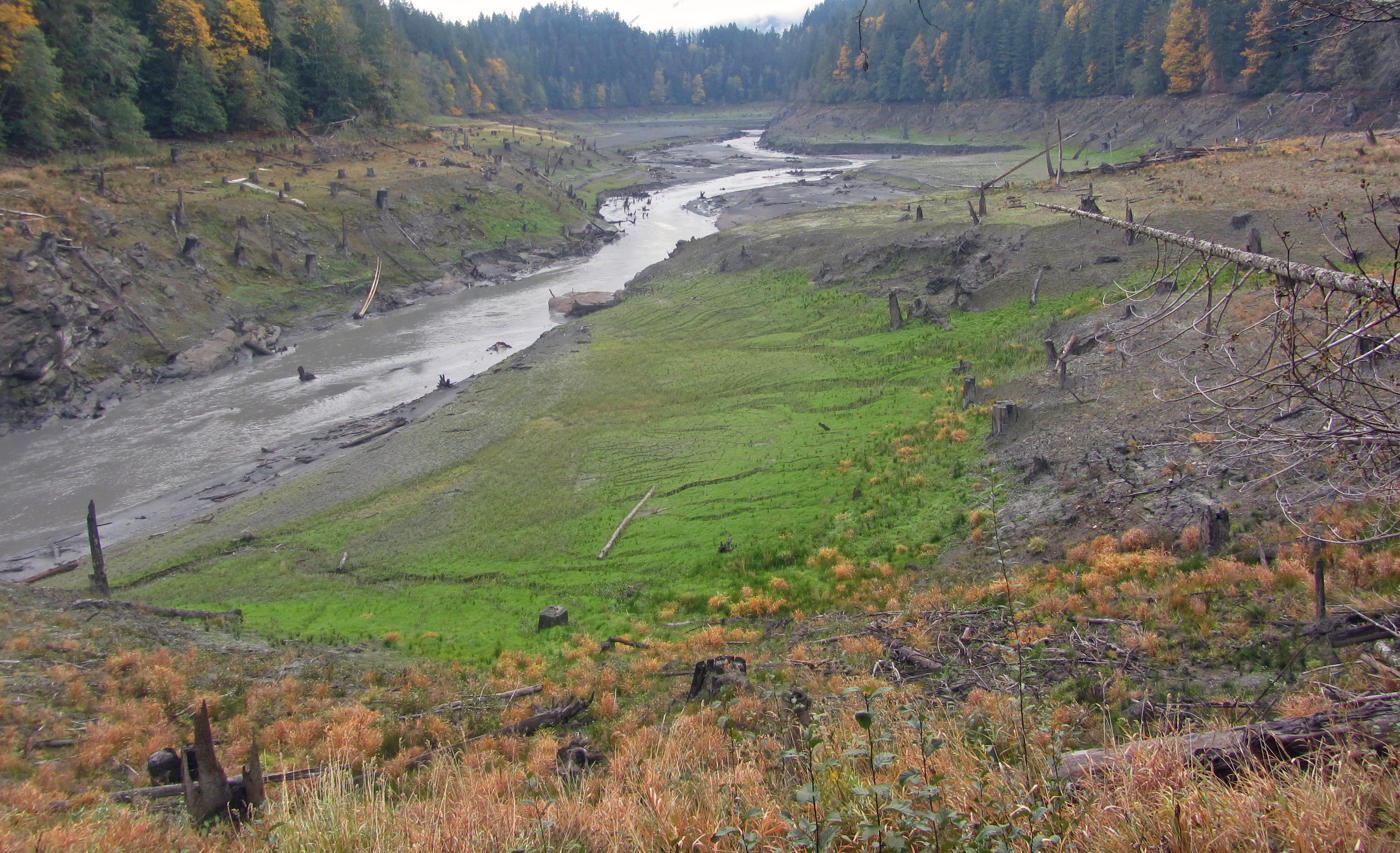
The progression of reclamation of 715 acres (2.9 km^{2}) of vegetation habitat currently covered by the lakes. The river channel restores itself to a natural state as does the vegetation. Prior to dam removal, upstream waters are depleted in nutrients, impounded waters increase in temperature, and downstream waters are depleted in sediments and woody debris.

The Elwha River Ecosystem and Fisheries Restoration Act of 1992 created funding and government support for mitigation of the dams on the Elwha. While fish ladders were proposed as a possibility, they were ultimately ruled out for the reasons given in the previous section. The major problem raised with regard to removal of the two dams was the approximately 34 million cubic yards of sediment that had built up behind the dams. Of that 34 million, 28 million was behind the Glines Canyon Dam, while 6 million was behind the Elwha Dam. Releasing all of this sediment at once would have had devastating effects on the remaining habitats downstream from the dams, as well as along beaches at the coast. A drawdown experiment was conducted on the Glines Canyon Dam to assess the erosion of the sediments from Lake Mills. The lake was drawn down 18 feet (5.5 m) over one week and then allowed to remain stable for one more week. This test showed that the river would rapidly cut into the existing delta as soon as the lake level dropped, creating a deep, narrow channel. A new delta immediately began to form at the new lake level. Once the lake level was held steady, the channel migrated laterally along the existing delta. This test resulted in a sediment erosion model in which gradual drawdown of the lake would result in a greatly decreased sediment load downstream. Using this model, the plan was to drain the lake gradually over a two-year time period, allowing much of the sediment to remain in the old lake basin.

The model showed that after the two year dam removal period, the river would begin to restore itself to natural conditions. Sediment discharge rates would increase, resulting in restored and rejuvenated habitats downstream from the dams. Fish were anticipated to return to the upper reaches of the Elwha as soon as a year after dam removal was complete. While the river might never return to historically large runs, after 15–20 years or more, there should be a recovery of salmon runs to some sort of "pre-dam" condition. In addition to restoring the fish habitats, the draining of Lake Mills and Lake Aldwell would create an additional 715 acres (2.9 km^{2}) of terrestrial vegetation, improving elk habitats (Figure 1). Increased sediment loads were also predicted to help restore the retreating delta at the mouth of the Elwha.

Removal of the dams on the Elwha River was a long process. Physical removal started on September 27, 2011, and was completed August 26, 2014. There is uncertainty about how the river will transform itself and what period of time will be involved. Because so few dam removal projects have been accompanied by scientific study, perhaps fewer than 20, this project will be a model of the effectiveness of dam removal on this scale. If restoration of the river is successful, it could encourage a movement towards the restoration of natural stream morphology through the removal of larger dams. Most fish populations are expected to make a return to the river (Table 1). While fish may return to the river as soon as a year after the removal is complete, it may take 15 to 20 years for the river to fully return to its pre-dam conditions. The ultimate goal of the dam removal is restoring the river to a nearly pristine state.

Elwha Dam removal process

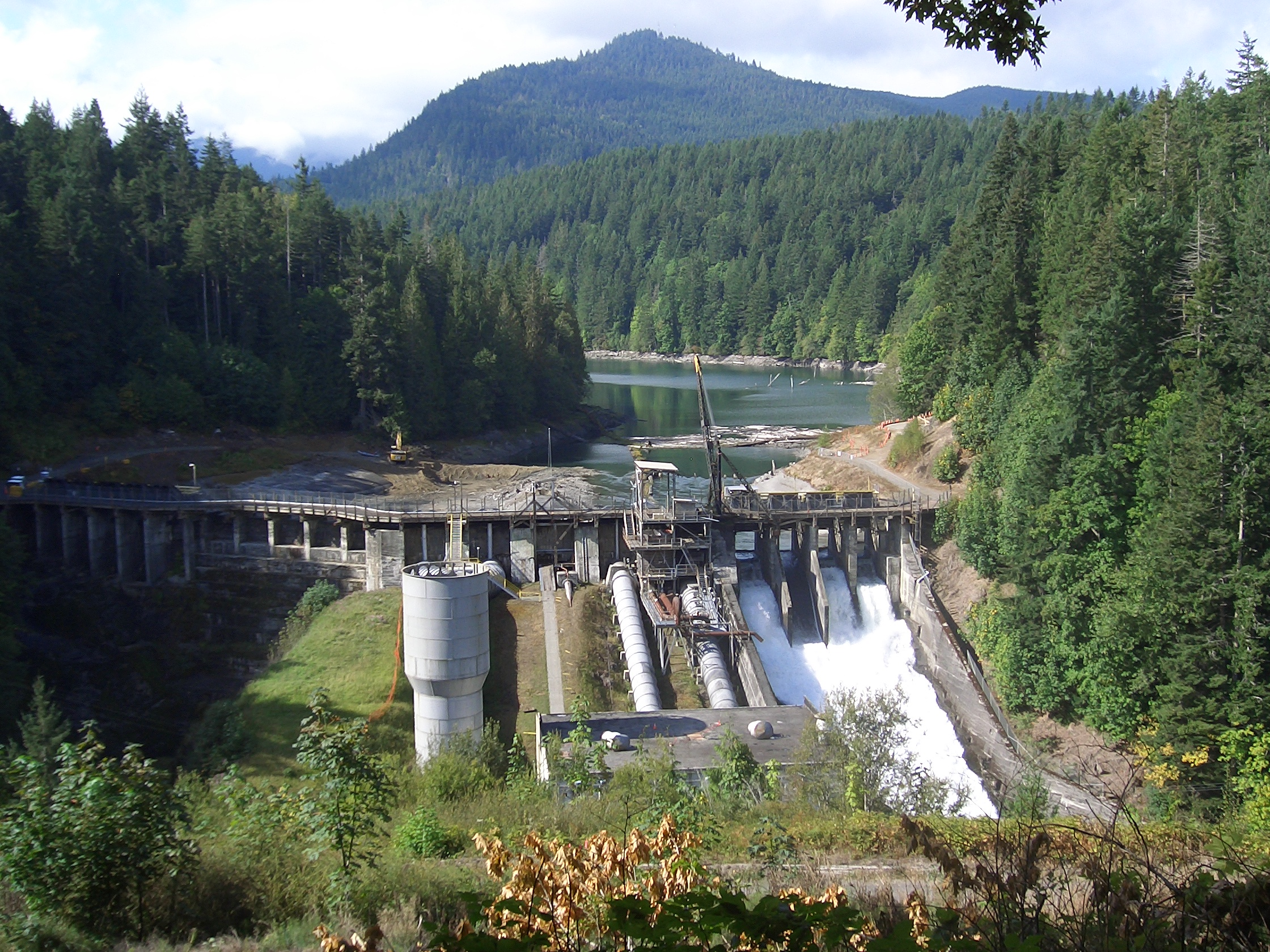
September 17, 2011

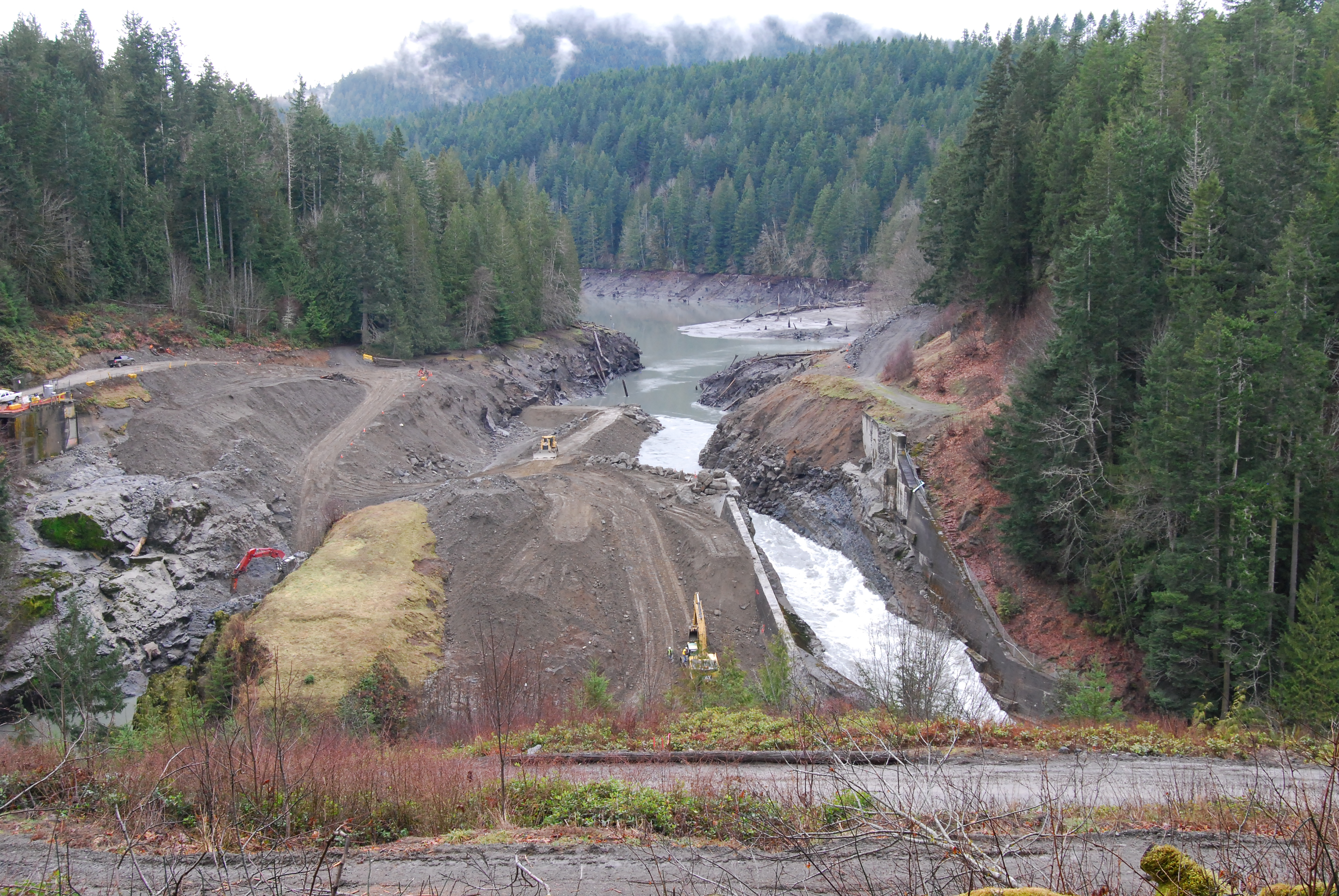
February 14, 2012

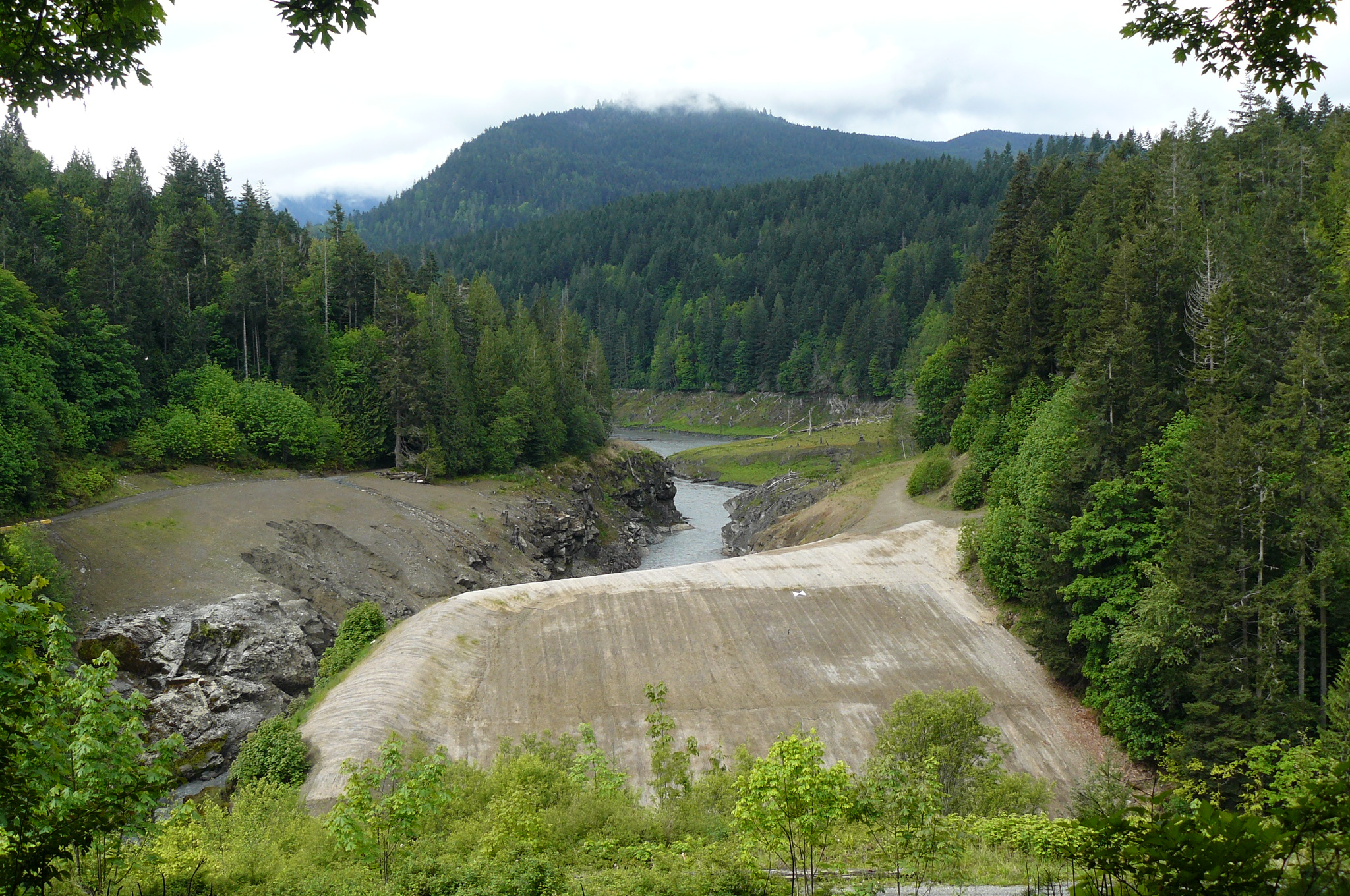
May 23, 2013

== See also ==
- Glines Canyon Dam
- Dam removal
