= Cubbage Pond =

Reservoir in Sussex County, Delaware, US

- Cabbage Pond
- Location within Delaware
- Location: Sussex County, Delaware
- Coordinates: 38°52′00″N 75°23′45″W
- Type: reservoir
- Max. length: 0.5 miles (0.80 km)

Cubbage Pond (also known as Cabbage Pond) is a reservoir on Cedar Creek in Sussex County, Delaware, United States, about 1.5 miles (2.4 km) east of Lincoln. It is approximately 0.5 miles (0.80 km) long.

Cubbage Pond Mill has stood on this site since about 1785, built originally by John and William Draper. Samuel Draper, eldest son of William Draper, inherited it around 1821 and sold it to Lemuel Shockley. John C. Davis owned the mill from 1833 to 1863, then Charles M. Miles was owner from 1866 to 1879. Subsequent owners were John Dubois (owned 1879–1881), Mark H. Davis (owned 1881–1892), Frank Davis (owned 1892–1908). It was last operated by Samuel Cubbage from 1908 to 1917. He died in 1917 and the mill was inherited by his widow Ida.

The properties were passed on from Ida Cubbage to W. Edgar Waples. The property passed from W. Edgar Waples to son-in-law Theodore Jones in 1928. In 1930 the property was sold in a Sherriff's sale to Joseph and Nancy Brittingham. In 1951 the Cubbage Pond and the millwrights property were sold to Orville and Susan Wilson. The Wilsons sold the properties to Henry and Mary Cofer in 1954; upon Henry's death in 1968 the property became solely owned by Mary Cofer. Mary Cofer died in 1980 and the property was inherited by her son, Gary Cofer who is the current owner. Use of Cubbage Pond is limited to property owners bordering the pond and those given permission by the current owner. The only regulations are those set forth by the State of Delaware. Fishing from the property along the road is tolerated; but, the local residents generally don't tolerate much noise and littering and are encouraged by the current owner to report any problems they may have to the Delaware State Police and/or the Department of Natural Resources and Environmental Control.
