= Lake Aldwell =

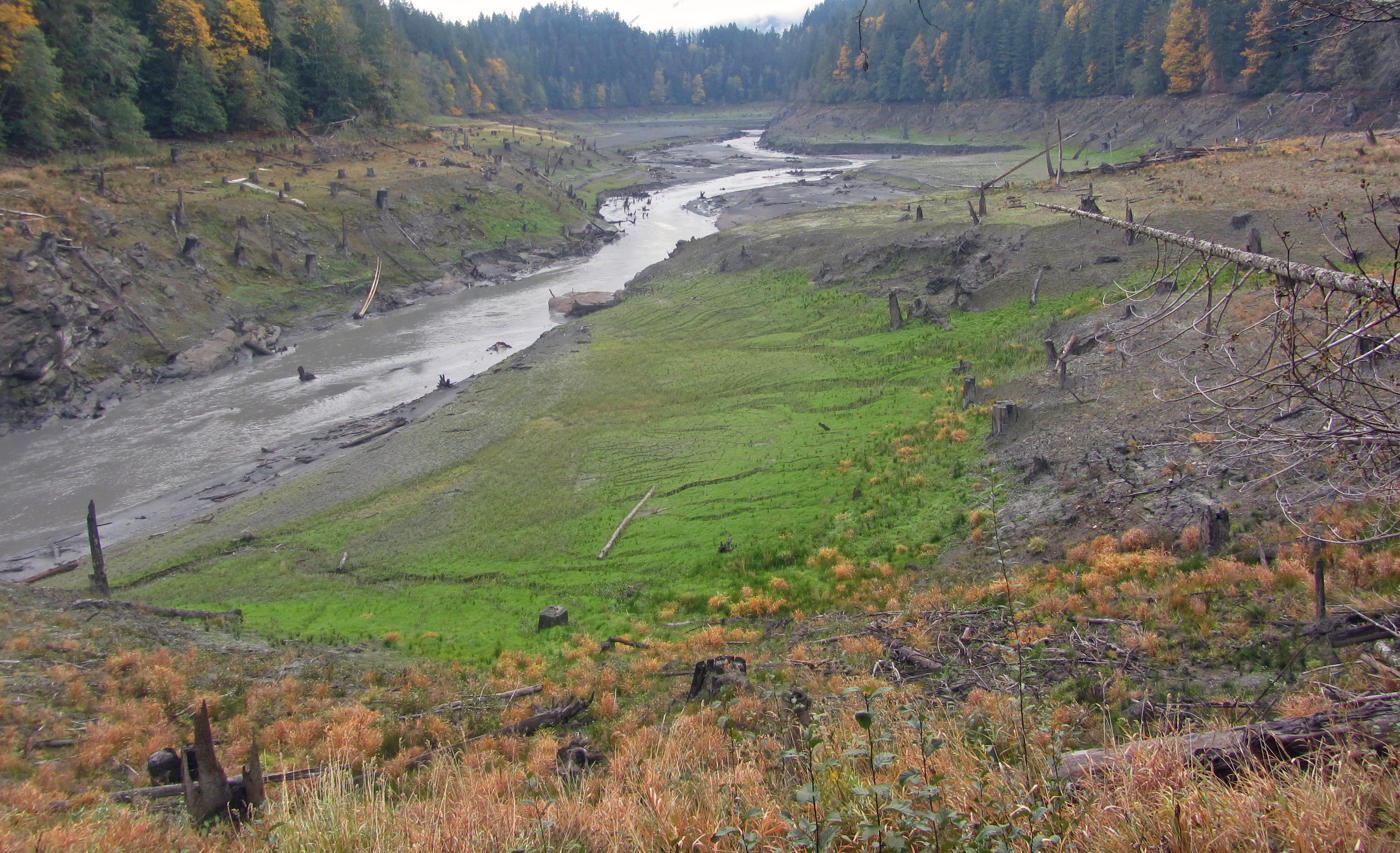
- Lake bed and river in 2012, after Elwha Dam removal

- Location within Washington (state) Location within the United States
- Location: Olympic Peninsula, Clallam County, Washington, United States
- Coordinates: 48°04′50″N 123°34′15″W
- Type: reservoir
- Primary inflows: Elwha River
- Primary outflows: Elwha River
- Catchment area: 315 sq mi (820 km^{2})
- Basin countries: United States
- Surface area: 270 acres (110 ha)
- Max. depth: 94 ft (29 m)
- Surface elevation: 188 ft (57 m)

Lake Aldwell was a reservoir located about 4.9 miles (7.9 km) from the mouth of the Elwha River on the Olympic Peninsula in the U.S. state of Washington. The reservoir was created in 1913 behind the Elwha Dam, which was fully removed in 2012. The Elwha Dam blocked at least 70 miles (110 km) of fish habitat for Pacific Salmon and steelhead within Olympic National Park.

== Fish population ==
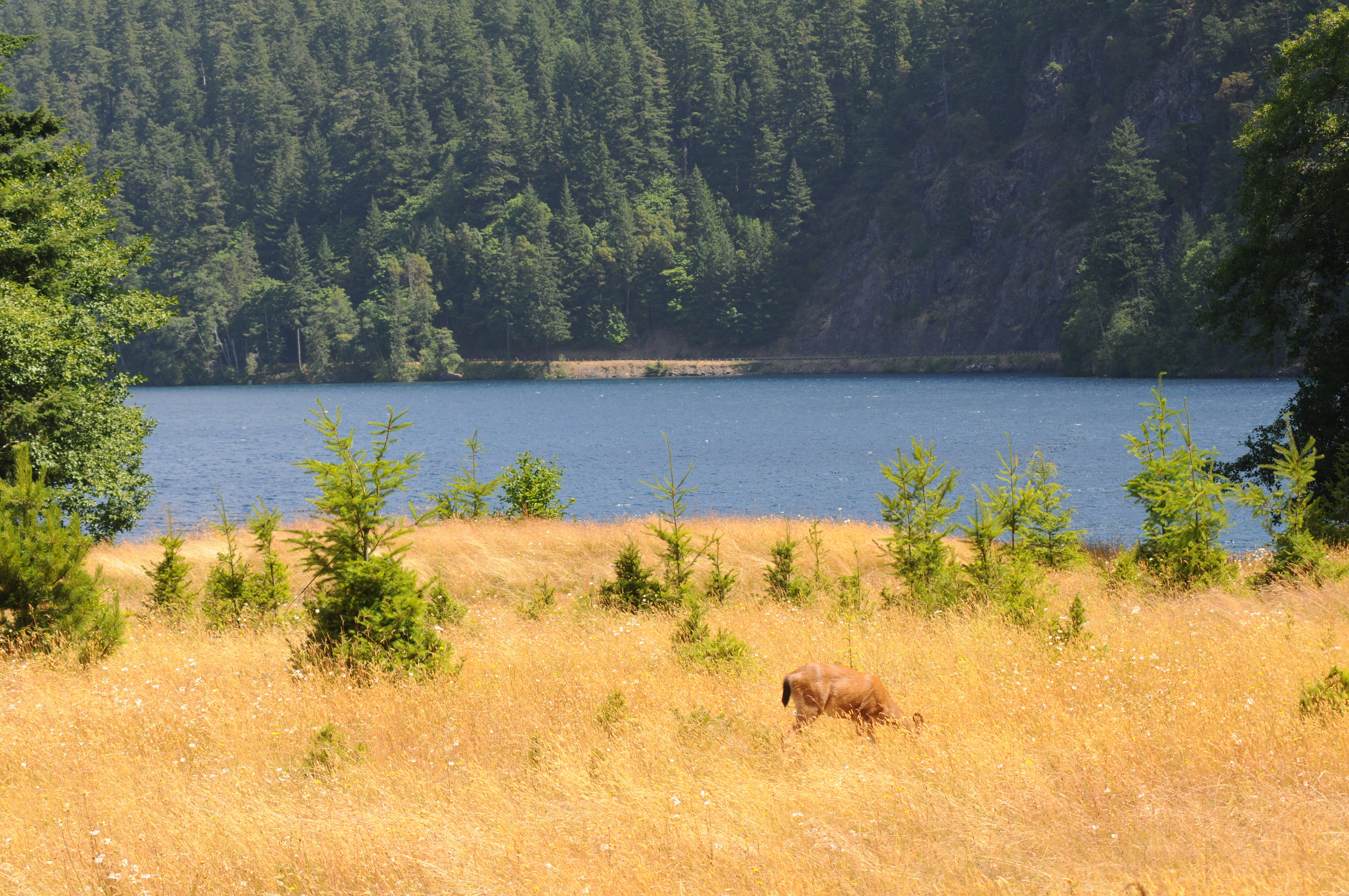
Lake Aldwell, 2008

Lake Aldwell was home to a population of kokanee sockeye salmon from Indian Creek and Lake Sutherland which, unable to access the Pacific Ocean, used the reservoir as their habitat during their adult lives. These salmon accessed the reservoir via Indian Creek and spawned in Lake Sutherland, just below Lake Crescent. The lake also contained bull trout, rainbow trout, and a population of introduced eastern brook trout.

== Ecosystem restoration ==
In 2012, the Elwha Ecosystem Restoration project removed the Elwha Dam and began to restore the fisheries of the river. Immediately after the draining of Lake Aldwell, revegetation crews began planting native vegetation to stabilize the slopes from erosion and speed up ecological restoration. It is expected that the fish populations that reside above the lake will return to their original anadromous lifestyle shortly thereafter.
