= Hoopes Reservoir =

Reservoir in Delaware, United States

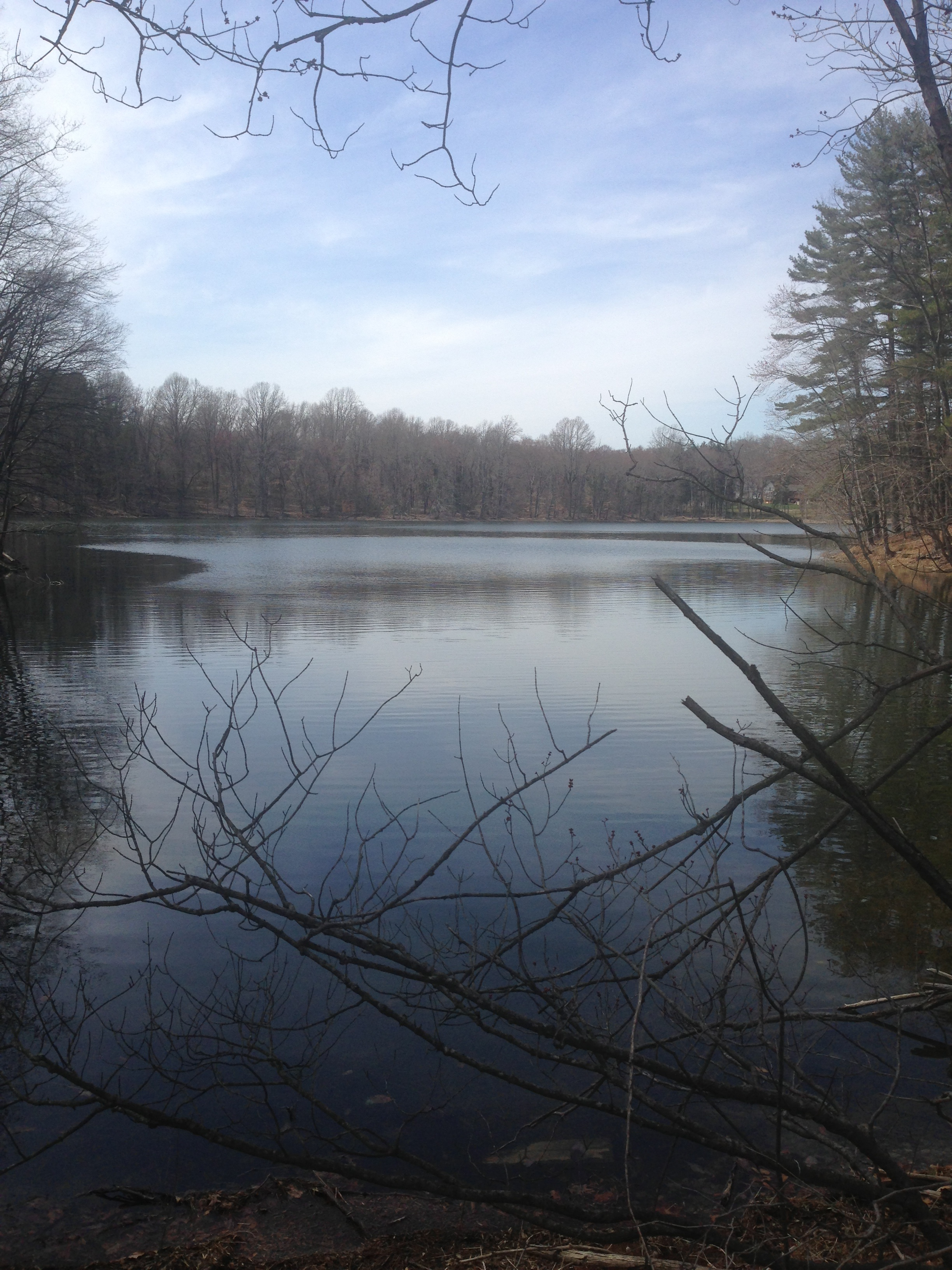
- Hoopes Reservoir in spring

- Location within Delaware Location within the United States
- Location: New Castle County, Delaware, United States
- Coordinates: 39°46′27″N 75°38′03″W
- Surface area: 187 acres (76 ha)
- Water volume: 479,160,000 cubic feet (13,568,000 m^{3})

Hoopes Reservoir is a reservoir in New Castle County, Delaware.

The reservoir first impounded the water of Old Mill Stream and Red Clay Creek in 1932, with a dam built by the city of Wilmington, Delaware, for municipal drinking water. It has a water surface of 187 acres (76 ha), a maximum capacity of 11,000 acre-feet (14,000,000 m^{3}), and a normal capacity of 6,300 acre-feet (7,800,000 m^{3}). The reservoir and its surroundings have been closed to the public since 1971. It is the largest reservoir in Delaware.

The dam, Edgar M. Hoopes Dam (National ID # DE00015), is a concrete gravity dam originally built in 1932 and restructured several times since. It is 135 feet (41 m) high and 845 feet (258 m) in length at the crest. Its namesake, Edgar M. Hoopes, was Chief Engineer of the Wilmington Water Department from 1913 through 1918, according to a plaque on site.
