= Dam removal =

Process of demolishing a dam

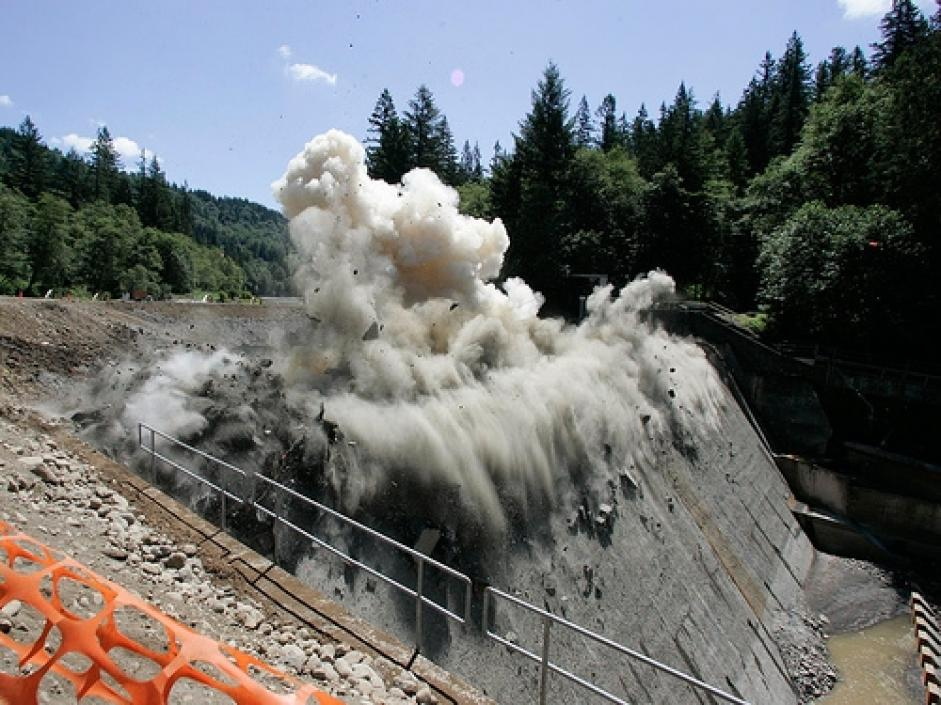
Removal of the Marmot Dam, Sandy River, Oregon

Dam removal is the process of demolishing a dam, returning water flow to the river. Arguments for dam removal consider whether their negative effects outweigh their benefits. The benefits of dams include hydropower production, flood control, irrigation, and navigation. Negative effects of dams include environmental degradation, such as reduced primary productivity, loss of biodiversity, and declines in native species; some negative effects worsen as dams age, like structural weakness, reduced safety, sediment accumulation, and high maintenance expense. The rate of dam removals in the United States has increased over time, in part driven by dam age. As of 1996, 5,000 large dams around the world were more than 50 years old. In 2020, 85% percent of dams in the United States are more than 50 years old. In the United States roughly 900 dams were removed between 1990 and 2015, and by 2015, the rate was 50 to 60 per year. France and Canada have also completed significant removal projects. Japan's first removal, of the Arase Dam on the Kuma River, began in 2012 and was completed in 2017. A number of major dam removal projects have been motivated by environmental goals, particularly restoration of river habitat, native fish, and unique geomorphological features. For example, fish restoration motivated the Elwha Ecosystem Restoration and the dam removal on the river Allier, while recovery of both native fish and of travertine deposition motivated the restoration of Fossil Creek.

== Purposes and effects of dams ==
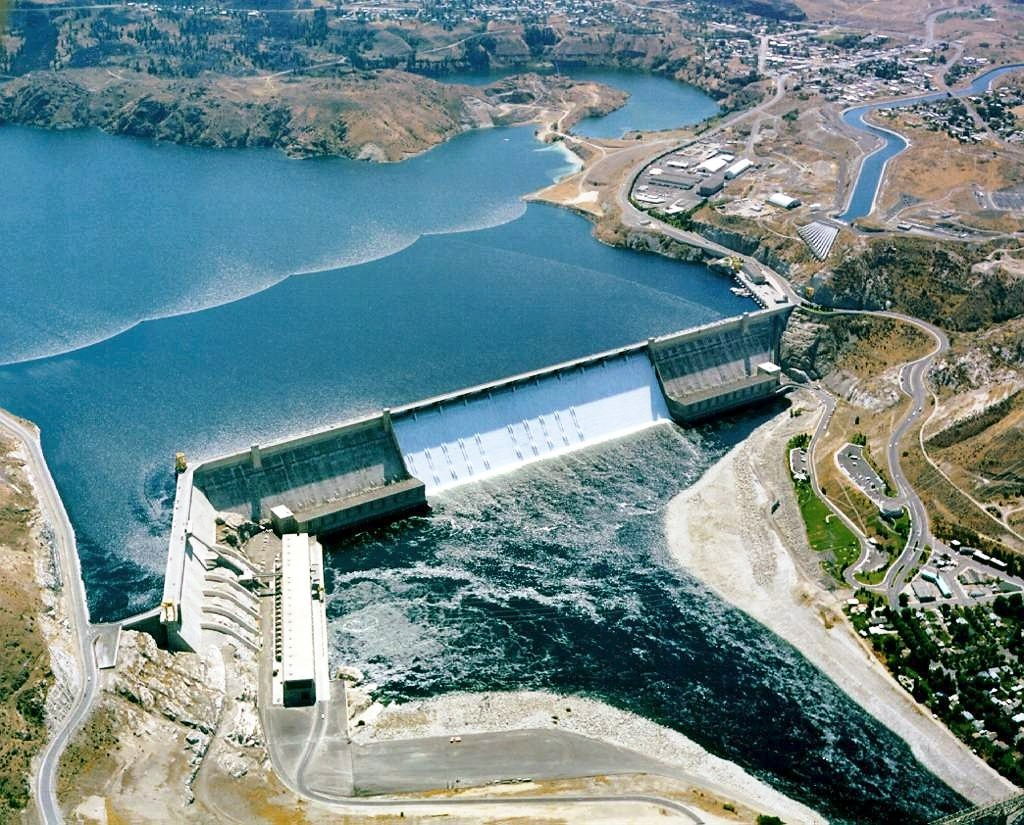
Grand Coulee Dam, Columbia River, Washington, United States

Many of the dams in the eastern United States were built for water diversion, agriculture, factory watermills, and other purposes that are no longer seen as useful. Because of the age of these dams, over time the risk for catastrophic failure increases. In addition, many of these dams block anadromous fish runs, such as Atlantic salmon and American shad, and prevent important sediments from reaching estuaries.

Many dams in the western United States were built for agricultural water diversion in the arid country, with hydroelectric power generation being a very significant side benefit. Among the largest of these water diversion projects is the Columbia Basin Project, which diverts water at the Grand Coulee Dam. The Bureau of Reclamation manages many of these water diversion projects.

Some dams in the Pacific Northwest and California block passage for anadromous fish species such as Pacific Salmon and steelhead. Fish ladders and other passage facilities have been ineffective in mitigating the negative effects on salmon populations.

Bonneville Power Administration manages electricity on 11 dams on the Columbia River and 4 on the Snake River, which were built by the Army Corps of Engineers.

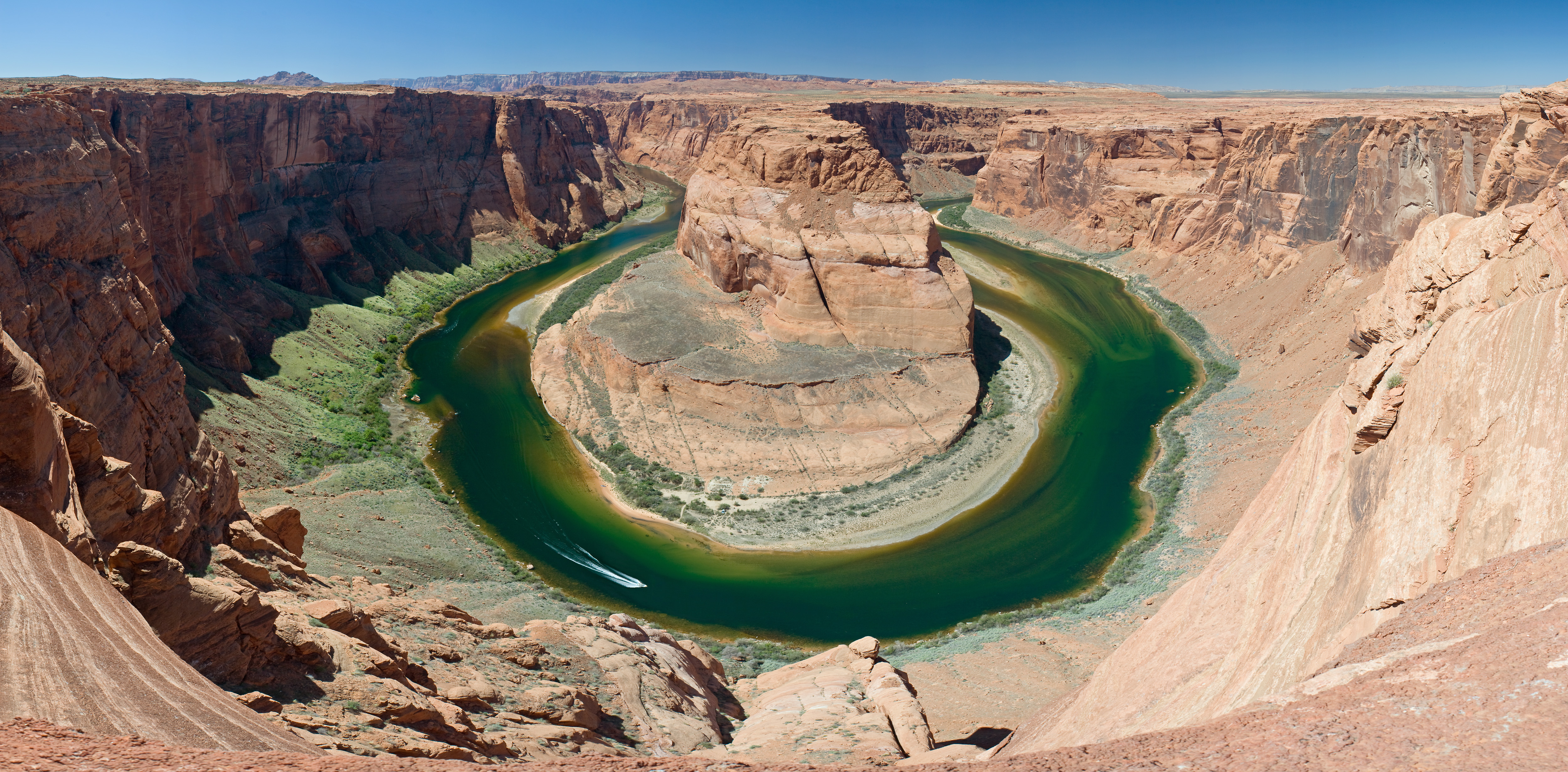
Clear water below Glen Canyon Dam, Arizona, United States

In the Desert Southwest, dams can change the nature of the river ecosystem. In the particular case of the Glen Canyon Dam, the originally warm, sediment-filled, muddy water, instead runs cold and clear through the Grand Canyon, which has significant impacts on the downstream ecosystems. Three native fish species have become extinct in the Grand Canyon and others are endangered since the dam was completed, including humpback chub and razorback sucker.

Some dam projects, such as those on the Salt River Project in Arizona, eliminate the flow of the river downstream, by diverting the flow into the Arizona Canal system for use in agriculture and urban usage, such that only a dry channel or arroyo heads out across the desert.

So much water is taken out of the Colorado River for agriculture, urban use, and evaporation behind the dams, that the river no longer flows into the Gulf of California.

== Methods of removal ==
There are several ways dams can be removed and the chosen method will depend on many factors. The size and type of the dam, the amount of sediment behind the dam, the aquatic environment below the dam, who owns the dam and what their priorities are, and the timeframe of dam removal are all factors that affect how the dam will be removed. Removal is costly no matter what and expenses typically rise when greater weight is given to environmental concerns. Fortunately, the cost of dam removal is usually shared by multiple stakeholders such as the dam owner and either the federal, state or local government. Four of the most common dam removal methods are described below.

Sediment management is a driving force in all of them. A common problem for dams is how sediment carried naturally by the river is deposited in the reservoir and eventually fills it up with silt. This excess sediment reduces the hydroelectric generating capacity of a reservoir, changes the river channel downstream, traps nutrient-rich sediment behind the dam, and can put a dangerous amount of pressure on the dam itself. Oftentimes the sediment stored in a reservoir is good for the riparian corridor below the dam, can rebuild fish habitat, provide nutrients, and add onto a beach or estuary. Other times, the sediment can increase the turbidity of the river harming fish, scour the landscape, and bury infrastructure.

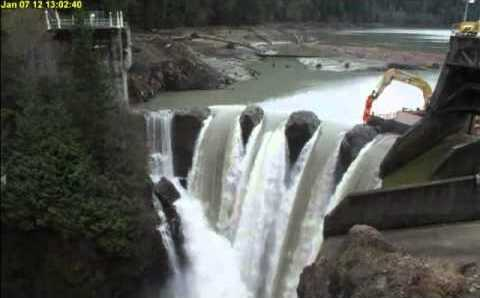
Here five notches can be seen at the Glines Canyon Dam as it was removed in a multi-year process.

Sediment can be tested before it is released to determine if it will be harmful to the landscape below the dam. Dam removal can have adverse consequences if this is not done. For example, when the Fort Edward Dam on the Hudson River was removed in the 1970s, PCBs in the sediment were released, affecting human and wildlife health downstream.

=== Notch and release approach ===
The notch and release approach is commonly used because of its ecological benefits. It is a slow method in which the reservoir is drained through notches cut into the dam. New notches are cut in so the water drains out of the reservoir at a consistent flow. The sediment trapped behind the dam flows downstream in a fixed rate that allows the ecosystem to adjust to the changes. This method can take months or even over a year but has proven success with restoring fish species to rivers. The Elwha and Glines Canyon dam removal project used the notch and release approach to great success and the Rindge Dam, which is completely silted up, is planned to be removed with a similar approach.

=== Rapid release approach ===
The rapid release approach is both the quickest and least expensive way to remove a dam, but comes with significant drawbacks. In this approach, a large tunnel is dug through the base of the dam and then connected to the reservoir. The entire body of water will drain through this tunnel in a matter of minutes or hours and the massive release of water and sediment can cause severe flooding and erosion along the river downstream for miles. This can devastate the riparian ecosystem along the river as well as dangerously scour bridge pilings, buried pipes, levees, and other infrastructure. However, if the reservoir held back by the dam is relatively small and quickly drains into a larger river or lake, this approach can be carried out with minimal impact on either the ecosystem or human infrastructure.

=== Dig and dewater approach ===
The dig and dewater approach is typically the most expensive dam removal method, but is necessary in some cases. It entails emptying the entire reservoir, allowing the sediment to dry, and then transporting it to a safe location for disposal. It is costly and slow, but if the reservoir is located very near hydroelectric generating facilities that would be greatly impacted by released sediments, it may be necessary. Another situation is if the sediments behind the dam contain toxins. Hauling them away and disposing of them safely is important for the ecological health of the river.

=== Retained sediment approach ===
The retained sediment approach is the final commonly used approach and involves leaving the sediment behind where it is. To do this, the river or creek must be rerouted around the damsite which can prove expensive and challenging. This may be carried out in places where the dig and dewater approach makes sense, but are too remote to be cost-effective. The San Clemente Dam on the Carmel River was removed using this method.

== Alternatives to removal ==
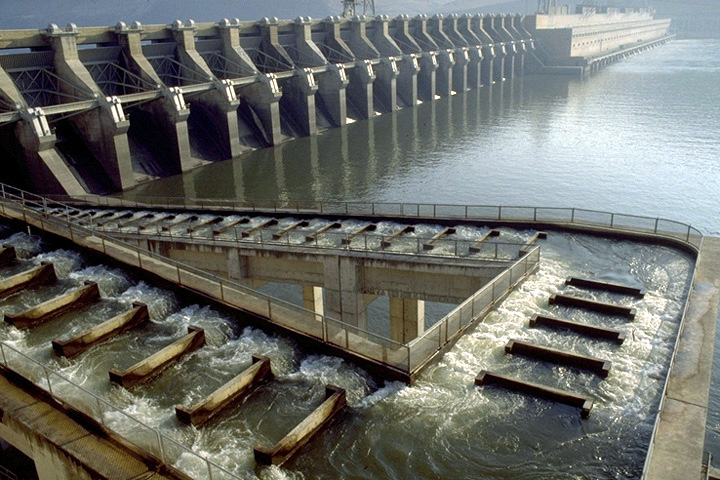
Fish ladder at John Day Dam on the Columbia River.

While fewer than 1% of United States dams are being considered for removal, there has been a push in recent years to address the deficiencies in existing dams without removing them. These goals include maximizing the efficiency of existing dams and minimizing their environmental impact. Updating equipment and acknowledging that dams have a limited life span are two ways to achieve those goals. As part of them, a plan for decommissioning the dam and restoring the river should be drawn up long before the dam exceeds its design life.

One part of river restoration that does not have to wait until the dam is removed is introducing environmental flow. Having variable amounts of water flow through the dam at different seasons mimics natural seasonal variations in water level from winter and spring storms. Additionally, fish ladders can be added to dams to increase the connectivity of a river and allow fish to reach their spawning grounds. There's debate about the effectiveness of fish ladders, but generally some fish will make it through as opposed to zero fish spawning in their traditional location.

Reservoir sedimentation can also be countered using specific dam management strategies.

== Dam removal in Europe ==
According to the European Commission, at least 150 000 barriers in European rivers no longer serve their intended purpose or are no longer required. River barrier removal is increasingly viewed as a practical, cheap, and desired solution, contributing to the goals of the European Union's Water Framework Directive, which focuses on decreasing and eliminating pollutants while also guaranteeing adequate water for wildlife and human needs.

To restore free-flow, the EU Biodiversity Strategy seeks to eliminate unnecessary dams and barriers across 25,000 kilometres (16,000 mi) of river by 2030. Dam Removal Europe helped dismantle 325 dams or other buildings in 2022, a 36% increase over 2021. The WWF, The Rivers Trust, The Nature Conservancy, The European Rivers Network, Rewilding Europe, Wetlands International Europe, and The World Fish Migration Foundation have formed a coalition to restore Europe's rivers and streams to their natural state.

== See also ==
- Dam failure
- Environmental impact of reservoirs
- Riparian zone restoration
- DamNation
- Dam Removal Europe
