= Goblins Gate =

Narrow Gorge in Elwha River, Washington State

Coordinates: 47°57′22″N 123°34′29″W

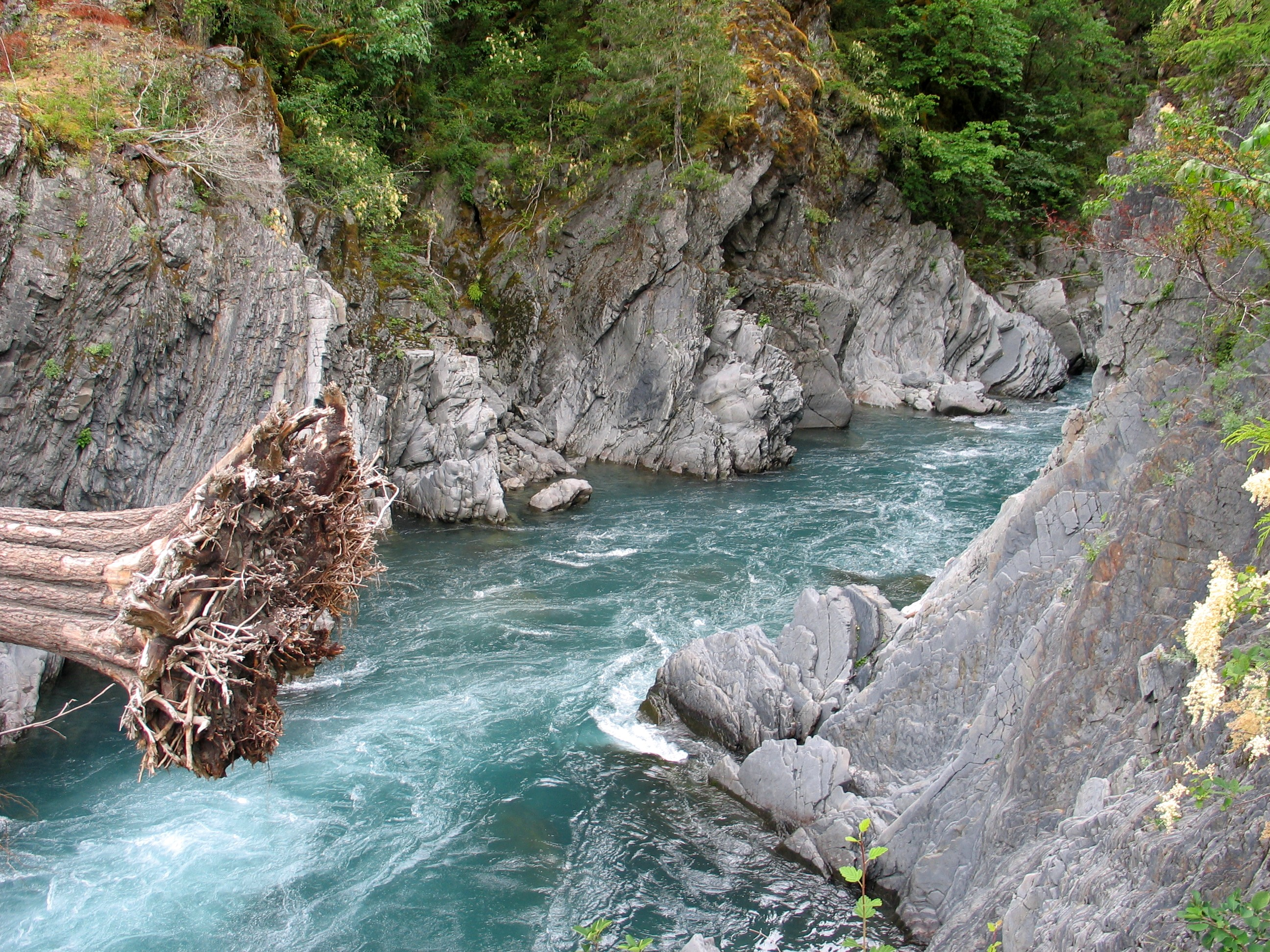
The Elwha River

Goblins Gate, or Goblin Gates, is a narrow gorge, about 20 feet (6.1 m) across, on the Elwha River in the U.S. state of Washington. It is located in Olympic National Park where the Elwha River enters Rica Canyon, 8.9 kilometres (5.5 mi) east-southeast of Olympic Hot Springs.

Toponymist Smitty Parratt described Goblins Gate: "...the Elwha River swerves at a severe right angle and tumbles into an extremely narrow cliffside opening. Resembling two large gates such as might have been found on a medieval castle, the rock portals appear to reach out and suck the waters of the Elwha into their grasp, only to send them plummeting down a precipitous canyon in a headlong rush to sea level."

== History ==
Goblins Gate was given its name by members of the 1889–90 Seattle Press Expedition. Charles Barnes, one of the expedition's members, described Goblins Gate as "...like the throat of a monster, silently sucking away the water." And as a resembling "multitude of faces...with tortured expressions."

The chasm of Goblins Gate has been bridged twice. The first bridge was washed away during a flood event around the turn of the 20th century. The second eventually became a decaying hazard and was removed in 1935.

== Natural history ==
As part of the Elwha Ecosystem Restoration project, Olympic National Park fisheries biologists snorkel-surveyed for salmonids along the entire Elwha River. However, due to dangerous currents within Rica Canyon, Goblins Gate was one of the only areas, other than the Grand Canyon of the Elwha where the surveys could not take place.

== Recreation ==
Goblins Gate is the first stop along the Geyser Valley trail route along the Elwha River above Lake Mills within Olympic National Park. It is 1.7 miles (2.7 km) from the Whiskey Bend trailhead. After Goblins Gate, the trail continues onto Krause Bottom, Humes Ranch Cabin, and Dodger Point Bridge, before looping back up to the Elwha trail and back.
