= Mount Delabarre =

Mountain summit in Washington state

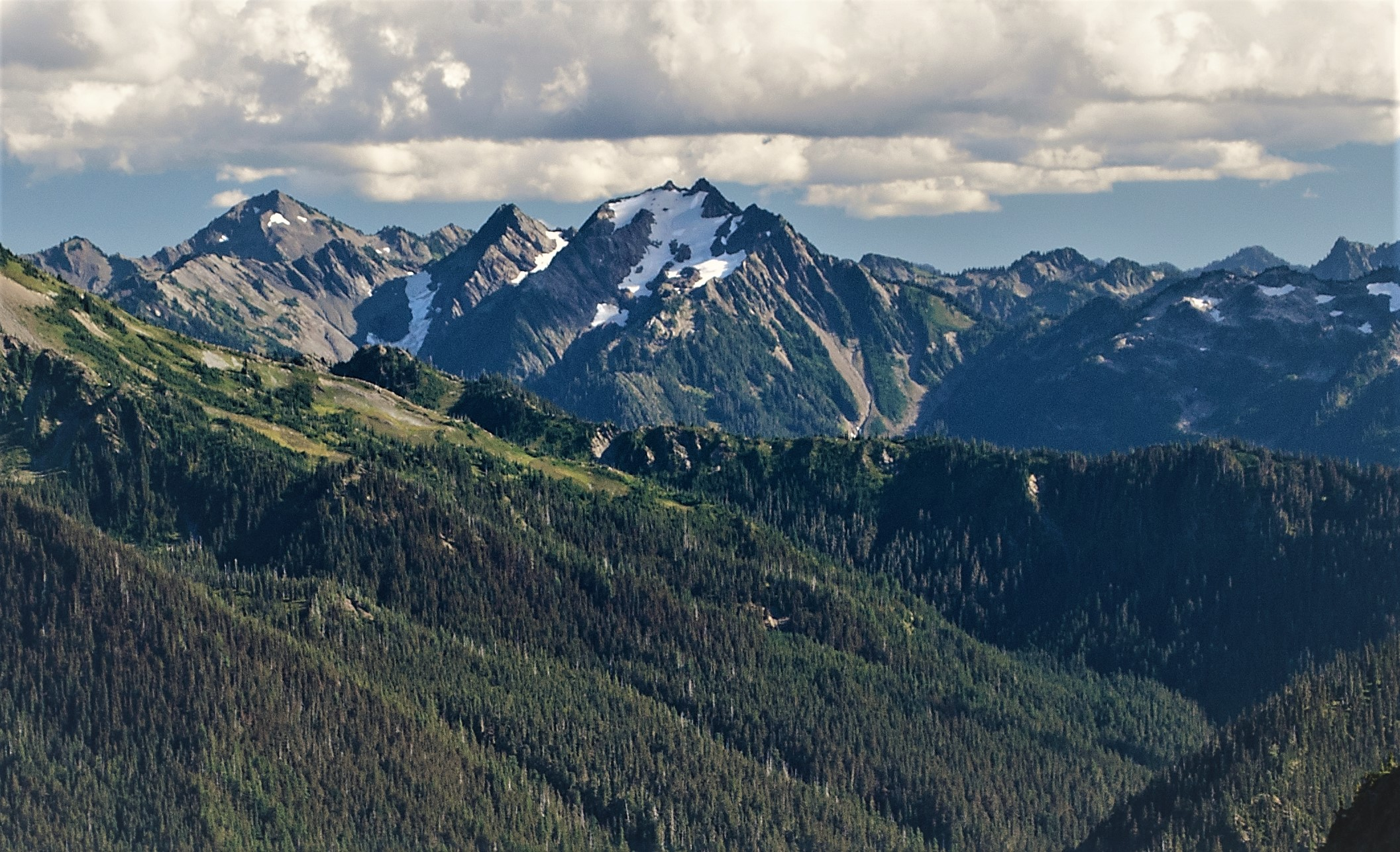
- Ice-clad Delabarre, north aspect

Highest point
- Elevation: 6,024 ft (1,836 m)
- Prominence: 1,140 ft (350 m)
- Parent peak: Mount Christie (6,181 ft)
- Isolation: 2.56 mi (4.12 km)
- Coordinates: 47°41′11″N 123°29′36″W

Naming
- Etymology: W. R. Delabarre

Geography
- Location within Washington (state) Location within the United States
- Country: United States
- State: Washington
- County: Jefferson
- Protected area: Olympic National Park
- Parent range: Olympic Mountains
- Topo map: USGS Chimney Peak

Geology
- Rock age: Eocene

Climbing
- First ascent: Unknown
- Easiest route: class 3 scrambling

Mount Delabarre is a remote 6,024-foot (1,836-metre) mountain summit deep within Olympic National Park in Jefferson County of Washington state. Part of the Olympic Mountains, Mount Delabarre is 12.4 miles southeast of Mount Olympus, set within the Daniel J. Evans Wilderness. The nearest higher neighbor is line parent Mount Christie, 2.5 miles to the west-northwest. Precipitation runoff from the mountain drains north into headwaters of Delabarre Creek, which is a tributary of the Elwha River, and south into Rustler Creek, which is a tributary of the North Fork Quinault River. Topographic relief is significant as the southwest aspect of the peak rises 3,400 feet (1,036 m) above Rustler Creek in approximately one mile.

== History ==
The mountain is named after W. R. Delabarre, the Port Angeles banker who provided financial assistance for The Mountaineers' 1907 exploration into the Olympic Mountains, which included the first ascent of Mount Olympus. At a later time, Delabarre and Asahel Curtis scouted a different trail to Mt. Olympus, and in the course of their journey, the men crossed the stream that would later officially bear his name.

The mountain is also called "Mount Taylor", but neither name has been officially adopted by the United States Board on Geographic Names, so the peak is not labelled on USGS maps.

Two scramble routes to the summit have been established: via Martins Park trail, and via Godkin-Rustler Pass.

== Climate ==
Based on the Köppen climate classification, Mount Delabarre is located in the marine west coast climate zone of western North America. Weather fronts originating in the Pacific Ocean travel northeast toward the Olympic Mountains. As fronts approach, they are forced upward by the peaks (orographic lift), causing them to drop their moisture in the form of rain or snow. As a result, the Olympics experience high precipitation, especially during the winter months in the form of snowfall. Because of maritime influence, snow tends to be wet and heavy, resulting in avalanche danger. During winter months weather is usually cloudy, but due to high pressure systems over the Pacific Ocean that intensify during summer months, there is often little or no cloud cover during the summer. The months July and August offer the most favorable weather for climbing this mountain.

== Geology ==
The Olympic Mountains are composed of obducted clastic wedge material and oceanic crust, primarily Eocene sandstone, turbidite, and basaltic oceanic crust. The mountains were sculpted during the Pleistocene era by erosion and glaciers advancing and retreating multiple times.

== See also ==
- Olympic Mountains
- Geology of the Pacific Northwest
