= Elwha =

Elwha may refer to:

== Places ==
- Elwha River, a 45-mile-long (72 km) river in Washington, US
- Elwha, Washington, an unincorporated community in Clallam County, Washington
- Elwha Dam, one of two dams on the Elwha River until being removed in 2012
- Elwha snowfinger, a perennial snowfield, separating the Elwha River and Queets River watersheds in the US

== Vessels ==
- MV Elwha, a ferry boat operated by Washington State Ferries

== Native American Communities ==
- Lower Elwha Klallam Tribe
