= Elk Lick Lodge =

Historic house in Washington, United States

- U.S. National Register of Historic Places
- Location within Washington (state)
- Nearest city: Port Angeles, Washington
- Coordinates: 47°51′26″N 123°28′9″W
- Area: less than one acre
- Built: 1926, moved 1939
- Built by: Grant Humes
- MPS: Olympic National Park MPS
- NRHP reference No.: 07000734
- Added to NRHP: July 13, 2007

Elk Lick Lodge, also known as the Remann Cabin, was built in 1926 by local settler and builder Grant Humes for Frederick Remann as a personal fishing retreat in what became Olympic National Park in the U.S. state of Washington. It was originally built next to the Elwha River, but was moved to higher ground in 1939 to escape the threat of flooding. With the H.H. Botten cabin it is one of only two private fishing cabins to have survived from pre-park days, both built by Humes.

Frederick Remann was a Tacoma, Washington resident. An attorney, he was a Pierce County Superior Court judge from 1926 to 1948. Remann and friends and family used the cabin until his death in 1949.

The cabin is rectangular, measuring 12 feet (3.7 m) by 16 feet (4.9 m) with a 6-foot (1.8 m) deep porch, of log construction with dovetail corners. The roof and gable are covered with cedar shingles.

The cabin was listed on the National Register of Historic Places on July 13, 2007.
