= Wolf Creek Falls =

Waterfall in Washington (state), United States

Coordinates: 47°58′26″N 123°35′26″W

Wolf Creek Falls is located in Olympic National Park in Clallam County, Washington approximately 10 miles (16 km) south west of Port Angeles, Washington. The falls is located on Wolf Creek, a tributary of the Elwha River. The falls is a tiered falls with drops totaling about 100 feet.
