= Boulder Lake =

Boulder Lake may refer to:

- Boulder Lake (Idaho), United States
- Boulder Lake (Washington), United States
- Boulder Lake (New Zealand)

== See also ==
- Bouder Lake
