= Grand Canyon of the Elwha =

Valley in Washington, United States

Coordinates: 47°56′26″N 123°32′24″W

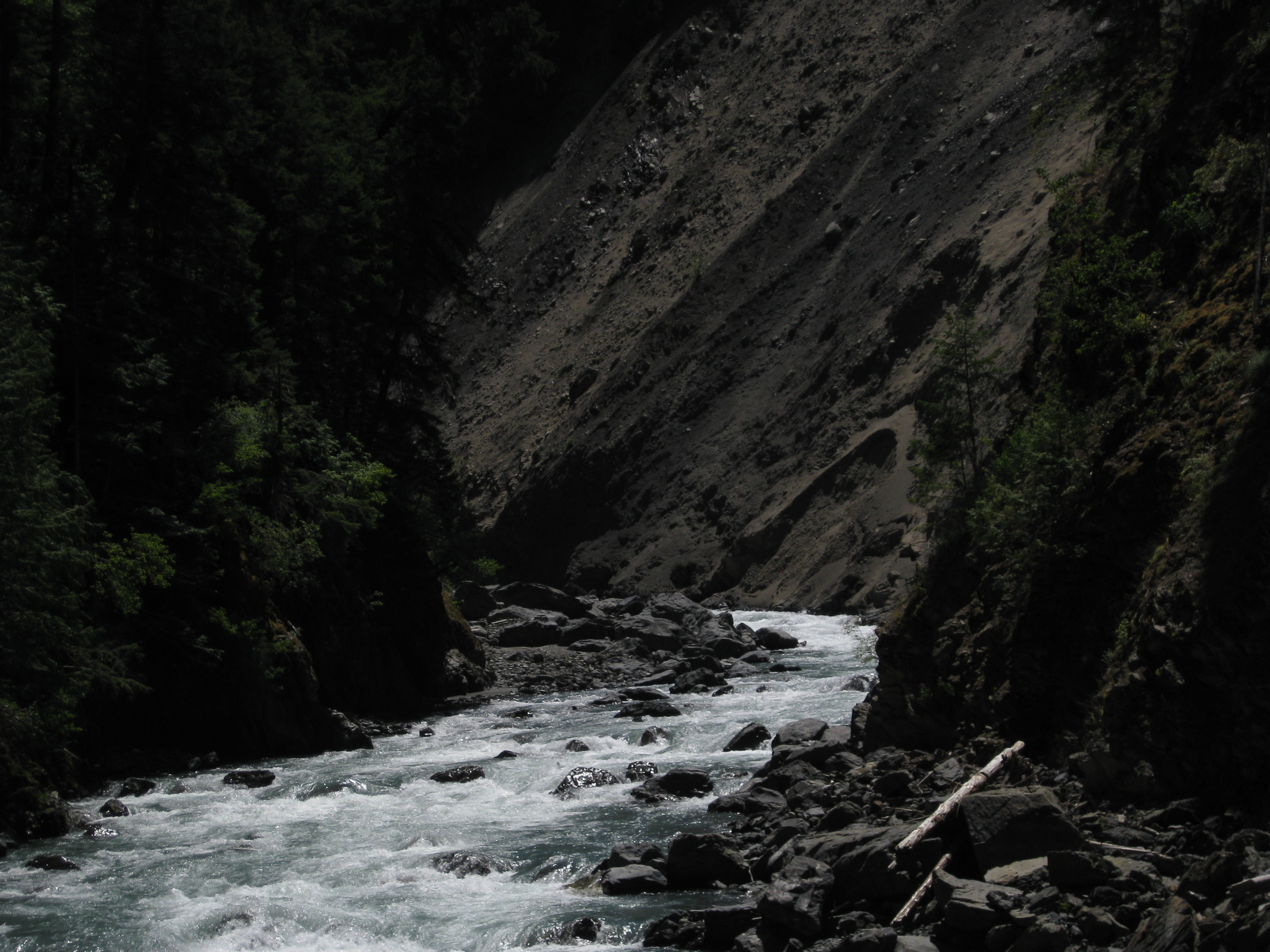
Grand Canyon of the Elwha

The Grand Canyon of the Elwha is a deep canyon on the Elwha River located below Dodger Point approximately 5 miles (8.0 km) upstream from the now-drained Lake Mills in Washington, United States. It can be reached approximately 3.5 miles (5.6 km) from the Whiskey Bend trailhead via the Geyser Valley trail. It is also about 1/2 mile (0.80 km) from Humes Ranch Cabin and 1.4 miles (2.3 km) from Goblins Gate.

The Elwha River is traversed by the Dodger Point Bridge, as it exits the canyon and just above Humes Ranch Cabin.

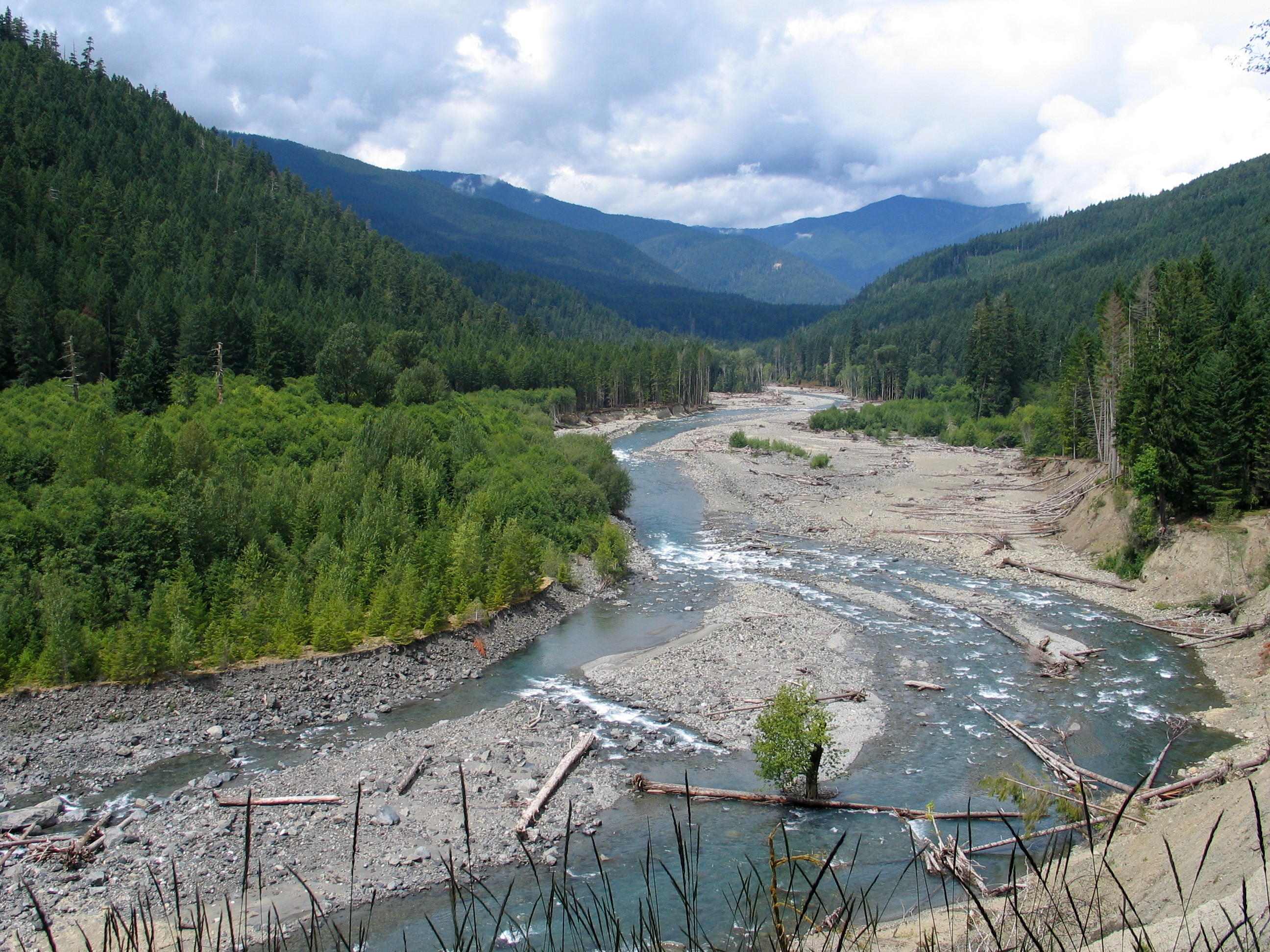
Elwha River as it exits Grand Canyon

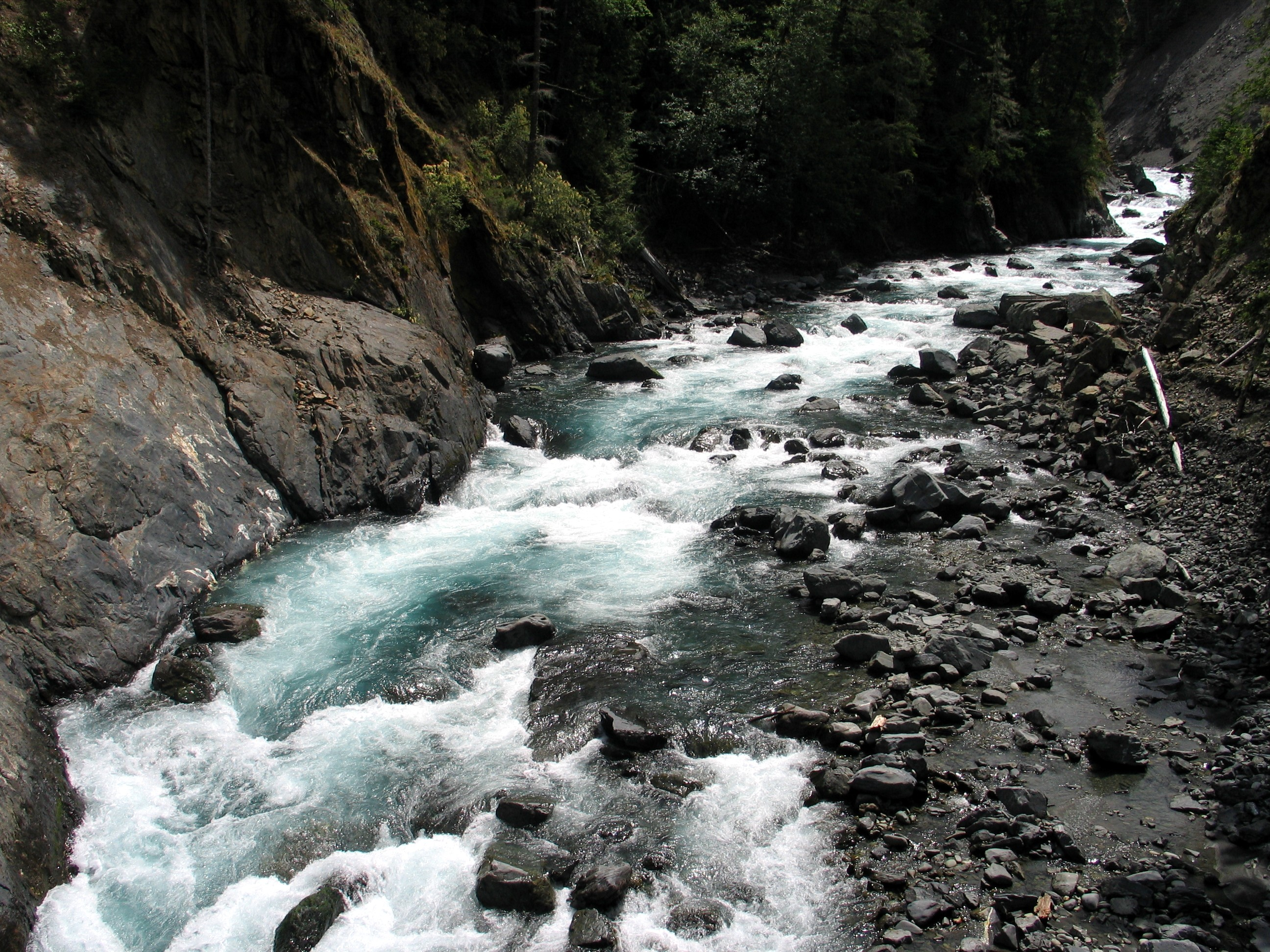
Grand Canyon of the Elwha
