= Lake Mills =

Lake Mills may refer to some places in the United States:

- Lake Mills, Iowa, a city
- Lake Mills, Wisconsin, a city
- Lake Mills (town), Wisconsin, adjacent to the city of Lake Mills
- Lake Mills (Washington), a former reservoir on the Olympic Peninsula formed by the Glines Canyon Dam
