= Boulder Peak (Washington) =

Mountain in Washington (state), United States

- Location within Washington (state)

Highest point
- Elevation: 5,672 ft (1,729 m) NAVD 88
- Prominence: 550 ft (170 m)
- Coordinates: 47°58′18″N 123°45′27″W

Geography
- Location: Clallam County, Washington, U.S.
- Parent range: Olympic Mountains
- Topo map: USGS Bogachiel Peak

Climbing
- Easiest route: scramble

Boulder Peak is a peak located in Washington state, in Olympic National Park. The mountain is accessible by using the Olympic Hot Springs Trail and the Appleton Pass trail. These two trails lead to Boulder Lake located at the base of Boulder Mountain where there is a campground. There are no official trails to the top of the peak, but one can find a beaten path and with a fair amount of scrambling can reach the summit. The summit offers views of the surrounding Olympic Mountains and various lakes. The round trip from trail head to summit is approximately 13 miles.
