= Lois Crisler =

American writer, filmmaker and conservationist (1896–1971)

- Born: Lois Eula Brown; August 8, 1896; Spokane, Washington, U.S.
- Died: June 3, 1971 (aged 74); Seattle, Washington
- Education: University of Washington
- Occupation(s): Writer, filmmaker
- Employer: University of Washington
- Notable work: Arctic Wild (1958); Captive Wild (1968)

Lois E. Brown Crisler (August 8, 1896 – June 3, 1971) was an American writer, filmmaker and conservationist. She wrote books about wolves and wildlife in the Arctic, including Arctic Wild. Her book Captive Wild recounted her experiences with an Arctic wolf that she held in captivity for seven years. With her husband, she created nature documentaries for Disney Studios about elk, bighorn sheep, bears, and caribou. Their short film The Olympic Elk was part of Disney's True-Life Adventures series.

Prior to her filmmaking, Crisler was an English professor at the University of Washington from 1923 to 1941. She lived at the Humes Ranch Cabin in the Olympic Mountains and wrote the "Olympic Trail Talk" column for the Port Angeles Evening News.

== Early life, education and teaching ==
Lois Eula Brown was born in Spokane, Washington, on August 8, 1896. She attended the University of Washington.

She started working at the University of Washington beginning in 1923. In 1925 she earned her master's degree from the university and was promoted to associate professor, teaching English. She was the national keeper of records for the Pi Lambda Theta honor society and historian for The Mountaineers club.

== Wilderness writing and filmmaking ==
After marrying wilderness photographer Herb Crisler in 1941, she left the University of Washington. They lived at the Humes Ranch Cabin in the Olympic Mountains at Hurricane Hill where they served as lookouts during World War II. She backpacked with her husband in the mountains where they filmed wildlife.

Crisler worked as a columnist for the Port Angeles Evening News, writing the "Olympic Trail Talk" column from June 1949 until the spring of 1951. She wrote about the history of the Olympic Peninsula, wildlife observations, mountain living, and the lecture tours of her and her husband. Crisler kept journals of her observations and since 1948 the pair travelled the United States, showing their nature films and giving lectures.

After seeing the film The Living Wilderness by the Crislers, naturalist Olaus Murie sent a letter to Walt Disney. Disney agreed to purchase their footage of elk and the cinematography was used for the film The Olympic Elk, part of the True-Life Adventures series of nature documentaries. Much of Crisler's original script was used for the film. They then partnered with Disney Studios and were contracted to film bighorn sheep in Colorado in April 1951. Crisler wrote to Olympic National Park advocate Irving Clark about the importance of the wilderness of the Olympic Mountains in early 1952. Later that year, the Crislers went to Alaska where they filmed brown bears and grizzly bears in Denali National Park.

In 1953, the Crislers travelled to the Brooks Range north of the Arctic Circle. She made observations about wildlife in the area while her husband filmed the migration of caribou. The Crislers wanted to film wolves for the documentary they were making for Disney, and procured two Arctic wolf pups from Inuit hunters. The wolves' parents died during the capture and three siblings did not survive in captivity. They named the wolves Trigger and Lady, kept them captive, and made an unsuccessful attempt at domestication. Still not having the documentary footage, her husband raided another wolf den, taking five pups, as "two wolves, the parents no doubt, bounded around crying." Once filming of the caribou finished, they returned to Colorado, boxing up the five pups for the journey. Lady had been killed by a wild wolf and Trigger had joined a pack before he was shot by a bounty hunter.

The Crislers moved to a property in the Tarryall Mountains near Lake George, Colorado, bringing the litter of wolf pups with them. Four of the five pups died within four months, having been shot or poisoned. Crisler kept the last wolf, Alatna, captive for seven years before killing her. Based on her experiences in the Arctic, Crisler wrote the 1958 book Arctic Wild. She received a Guggenheim Fellowship in 1962 to study mammal behavior in North America. Crisler wanted to change the public perception of wolves and wrote the 1968 book Captive Wild, detailing her experiences raising wolf pups, portraying them as both intelligent and complex. Conservationist A. Starker Leopold described her observations of wolves as "the most meticulous and complete description of wolf mannerisms and behaviour that has been written."

Crisler received a commendation from Washington Governor Daniel J. Evans in Olympia at the Governor's Invitational Writers' Day in 1969. She died in Seattle on June 3, 1971. Her papers are preserved in the Special Collections of the University of Washington.

== Personal life ==
Crisler married Herbert B. Crisler in Kirkland on December 7, 1941, the same day as the attack on Pearl Harbor. They divorced around 1968.
