= Geyser Valley trail =

Coordinates: 47°58′06″N 123°34′58″W

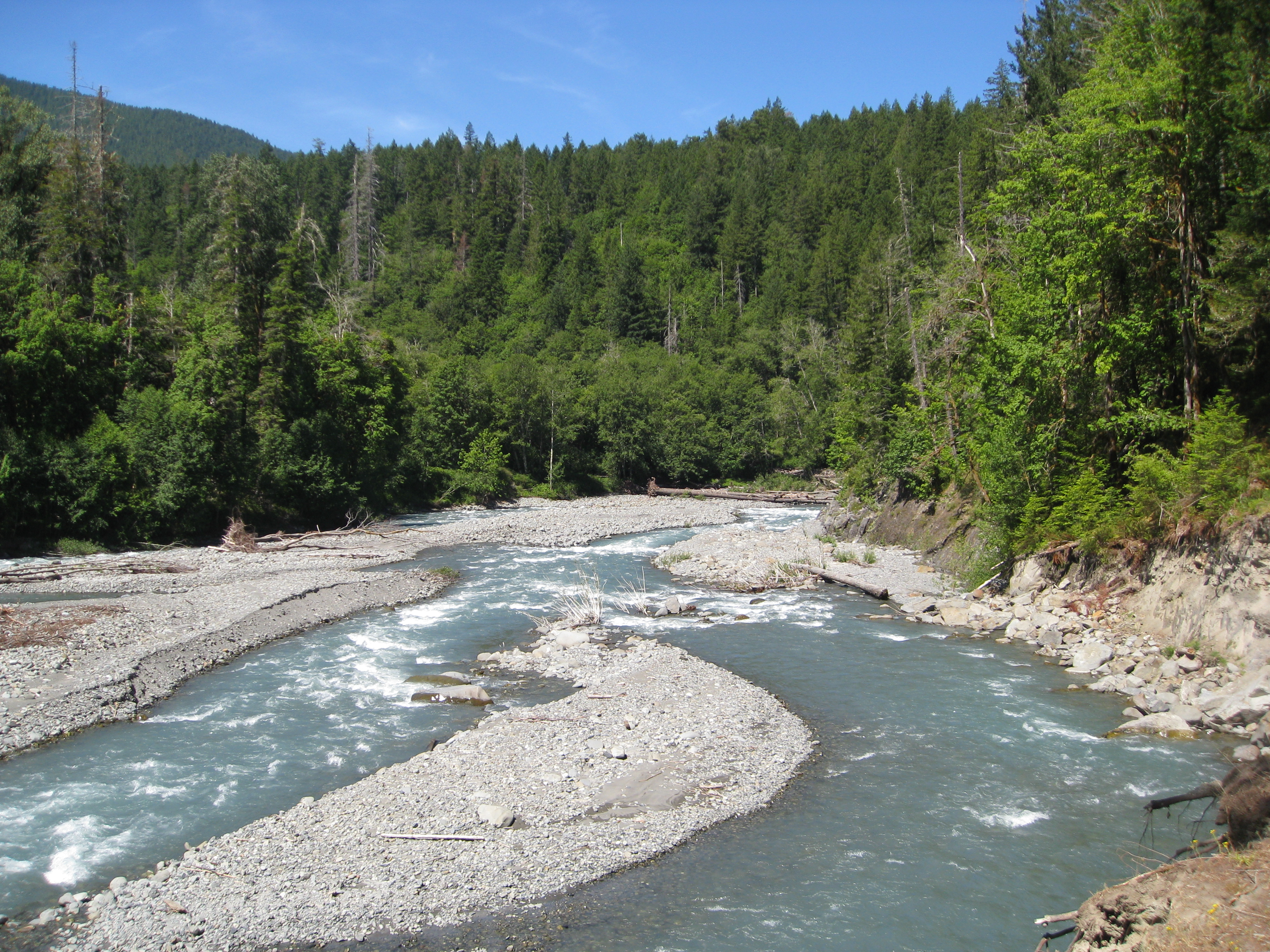
Elwha River near Krause Bottom

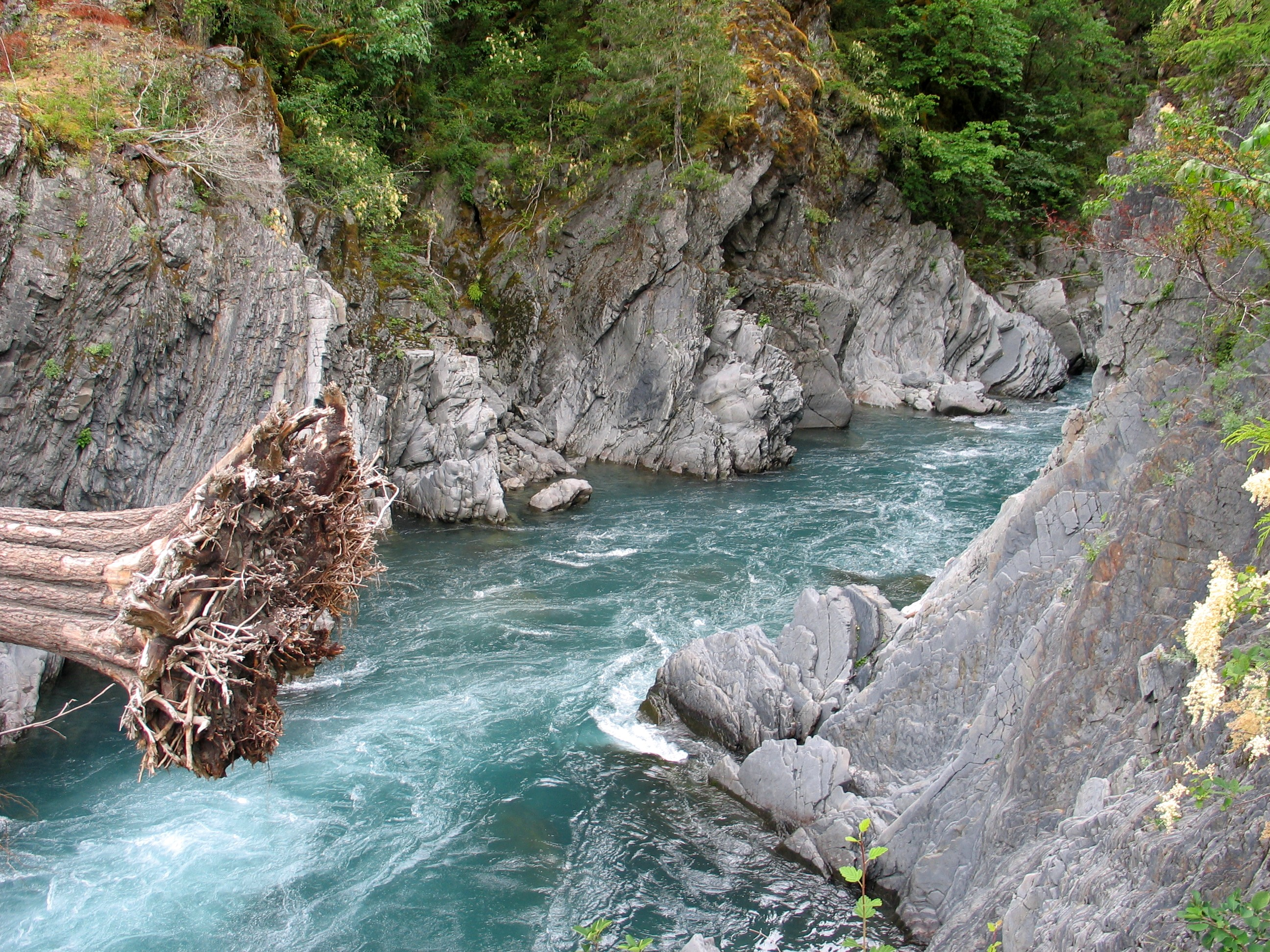
Goblins Gate on the Elwha River

The Geyser Valley trail in Olympic National Park is an area along the Elwha River between Rica Canyon and the Grand Canyon of the Elwha, where many homesteaders tried to eke out a living in the late 19th and early 20th centuries. Today, this trail allows hikers to visit several interesting sites, as well as, providing several loops of different lengths.

The route begins at Whiskey Bend Trailhead, at the end of Whiskey Bend road, approximately 5 miles from the Elwha Ranger Station. It travels for about 1.3 miles along the Elwha River trail, before the first descent down approximately 400 feet to Goblins Gate at the head of Rica Canyon. The trail continues along the Elwha River through a riparian forest of bigleaf maple, red alder, black cottonwood, with Douglas fir, Western red cedar, and Grand fir.

The trail passes the alder grove of Krause Bottom, where the first possible loop back up the slope heads up, and some old homesteader clearings, before arriving at Humes Ranch Cabin, approximately 3 miles from the trailhead. Humes Ranch Cabin is maintained today by the National Park Service as a historic site, and the meadows below the cabin are kept open as Humes once did. You can also see 100-year-old fruit trees in the pastures. Approximately 3/4 of a mile further, the trail climbs the eroding cliffs along the river and crosses Dodger point bridge at the mouth of the Grand Canyon of the Elwha. This marks the end of Geyser Valley, but the trail continues for 11 miles up to the summit of Dodger Point Mountain at over 5,700 ft.

It is possible to begin looping back to the Elwha river trail, by slowly climbing the slope. The trail will meet the short-cut coming up from Humes Ranch Cabin and then will pass the old homestead of Michael's Cabin. The trail then heads back on a level grade back towards Whiskey Bend trailhead.

Homesteaders historically reported seeing enormous numbers of salmon coming up the river each year to spawn. However, salmon have been blocked from the upper 65 miles of river habitat with the construction of the Elwha Dam in 1913. However, both the Elwha Dam and Glines Canyon Dam were removed in 2012. As part of the Elwha Ecosystem Restoration project, Chinook salmon began returning to the Geyser Valley.

== Gallery ==
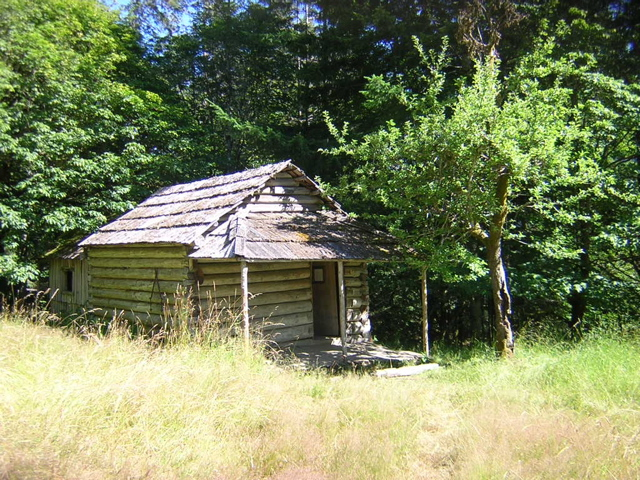
Humes Ranch Cabin Homestead Site

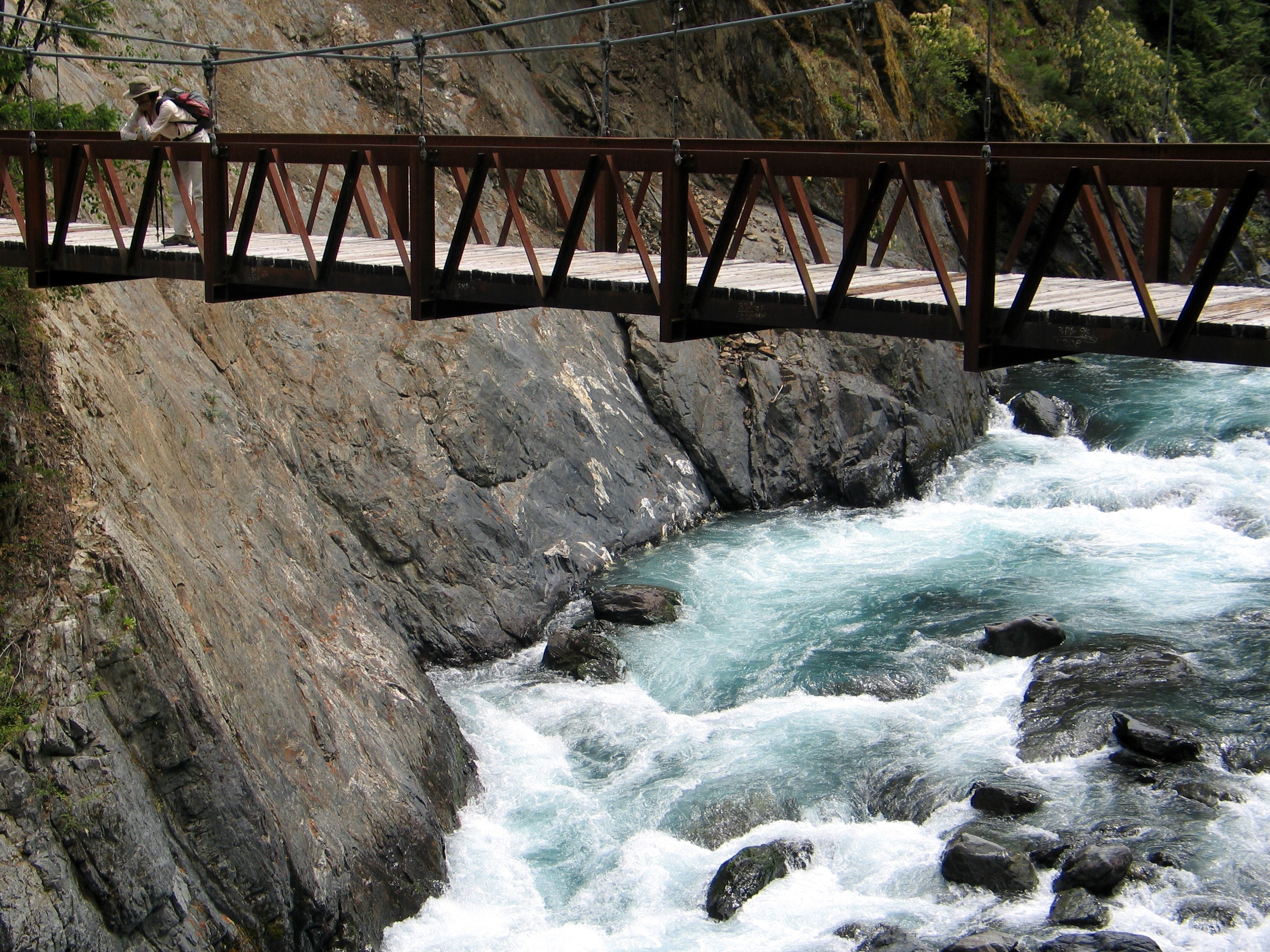
Dodger Point Bridge

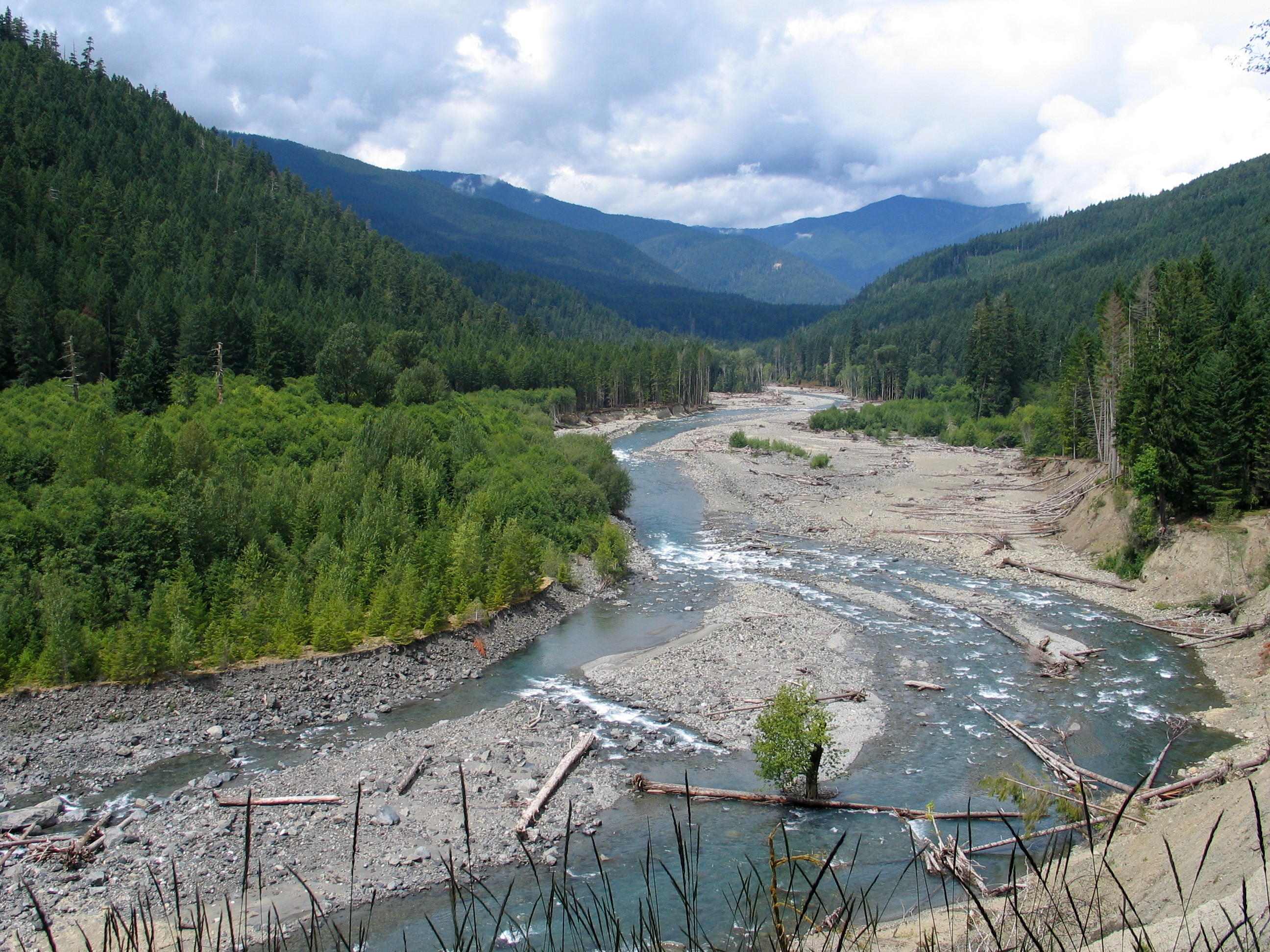
Geyser Valley of the Elwha River
