= Sol Duc Hot Springs =

Thermal springs in Washington State

Coordinates: 47°58′12″N 123°51′45″W

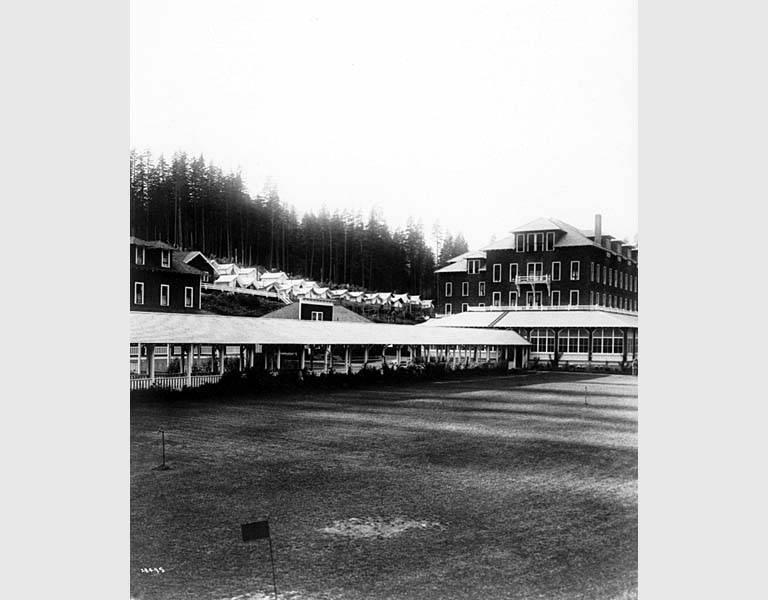
Sol Duc Hot Springs resort in 1914

The Sol Duc Hot Springs are a cluster of geothermal springs and pools in the Sol Duc Rainforest located in Olympic National Park, Washington state, that is best known for its soaking pools, hot tubs, and a swimming pool that are heated naturally via the heat provided by the hot springs. The resort with the same name is situated in a valley carved by the Sol Duc River.

The springs, known to local Native American tribes for their therapeutic value, first came to the attention of settlers in the 1880s. An elaborate resort opened up in 1912, and was characterized as "the most noted pleasure and health resort on the Pacific Coast" until it burned down in 1916. The resort was rebuilt on a much less grand scale in the 1920s, and was operated into the 1970s until it ran into trouble with its thermal spring in the 1970s. These problems were overcome, and the resort was rebuilt in the 1980s. It continues to operate until this day, attracting thousands of visitors a year. Also located in the area is the undeveloped Olympic Hot Springs.
