= Madison Creek Falls =

Waterfall in Washington (state), United States

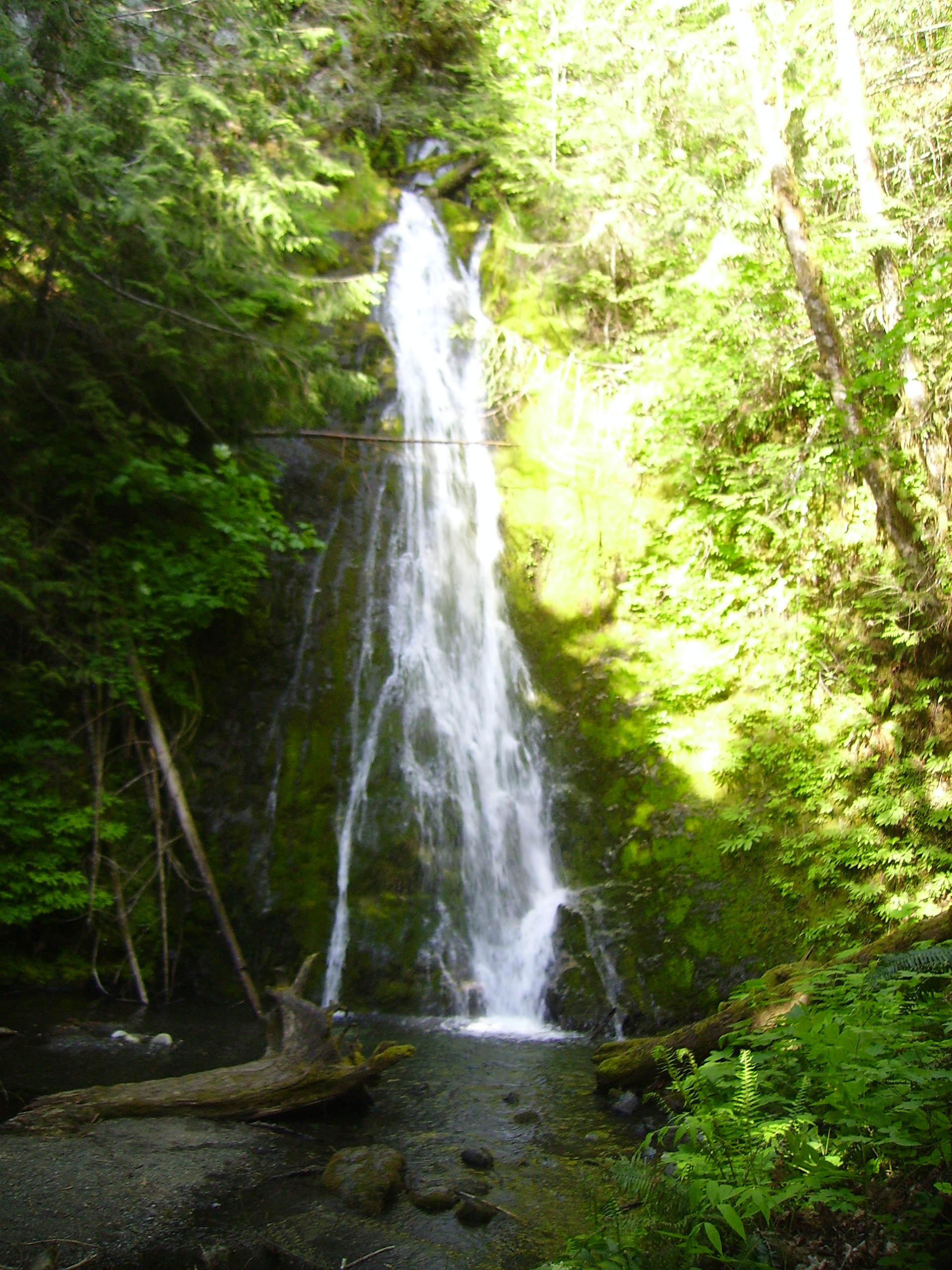
- Madison Creek Falls, May 2007
- Interactive map of Madison Creek Falls
- Location: Elwha River area
- Coordinates: 48°02′30″N 123°35′20″W
- Type: horsetail
- Total height: 50 ft (15 m)

Madison Creek Falls is located within the Olympic National Park near the Elwha River, west of Port Angeles, Washington. The falls is about 50 feet high and has a light flow in a horsetail shape. Another higher falls is located above the first, but is completely inaccessible. The paved trail to the falls is very short (less than 100 meters) and is wheelchair accessible.
