= Mount Christie (Washington) =

Mountain in Washington (state), United States

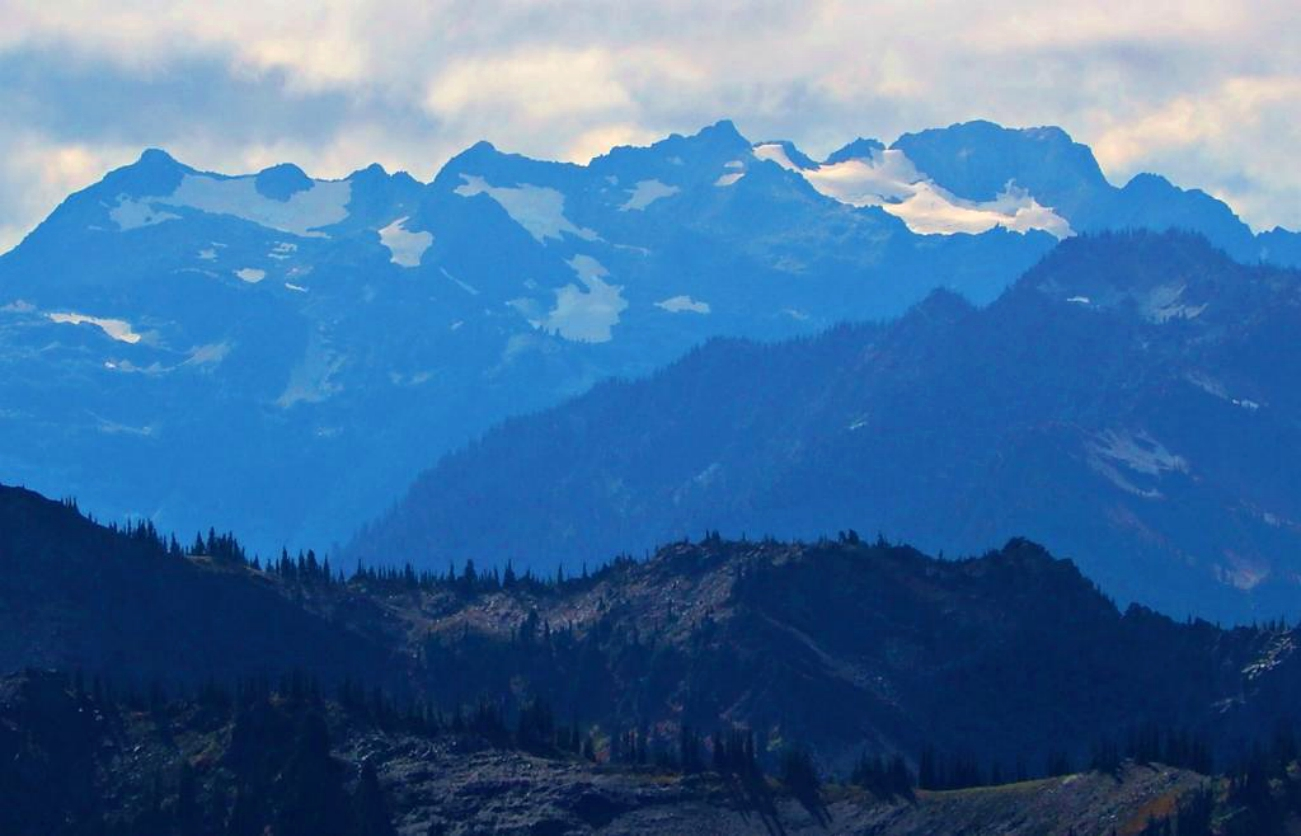
- Mount Christie

Highest point
- Elevation: 6,181 ft (1,884 m) NAVD 88
- Prominence: 1,777 ft (542 m)
- Coordinates: 47°41′53″N 123°32′43″W

Geography
- Location: Jefferson County, Washington, U.S.
- Parent range: Olympic Mountains
- Topo map: USGS Mount Christie

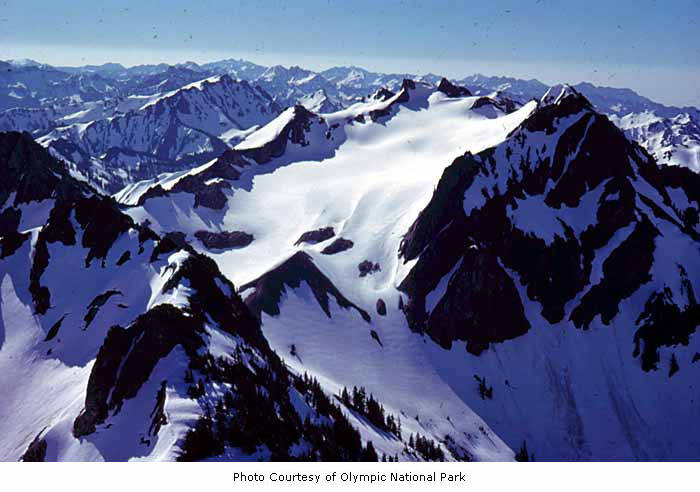
Mount Christie, aerial view

Mount Christie is high peak in the Olympic Mountains of Washington in Olympic National Park. Mount Christie is located in the Queets-Quinault group. Precipitation on Mt. Christie drains into the Elwha River on the north side, and into the Quinault River on the south side. The mountain was named to honor James Halbold Christie, who was the leader of the Seattle Press Expedition which first explored the unknown interior of the range in 1889–1890. The massif has several peaks, and the large Christie Glacier resides in the north cirque below the main summit.

== Climate ==
Mount Christie is located in the marine west coast climate zone of western North America. Most weather fronts originate in the Pacific Ocean, and travel northeast toward the Olympic Mountains. As fronts approach, they are forced upward by the peaks of the Olympic Range, causing them to drop their moisture in the form of rain or snowfall (Orographic lift). As a result, the Olympics experience high precipitation, especially during the winter months. During winter months, weather is usually cloudy, but, due to high pressure systems over the Pacific Ocean that intensify during summer months, there is often little or no cloud cover during the summer. Because of maritime influence, snow tends to be wet and heavy, resulting in avalanche danger.

== See also ==
- List of mountains of the United States
