= Humes Ranch Cabin =

Historic house in Washington, United States

- U.S. National Register of Historic Places
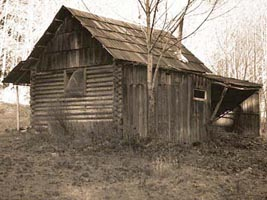
- Nearby Michael's Cabin.

- Location within Washington (state)
- Location: On Elwha River, along Geyser Valley trail, about 12.7 miles (20.4 km) southwest of Port Angeles, in Olympic National Park
- Coordinates: 47°56′59″N 123°32′48″W
- Area: less than one acre
- Built: 1900
- Architect: William Humes
- NRHP reference No.: 77001332
- Added to NRHP: September 14, 1977

The Humes Ranch cabin was built around the year 1900 by William Humes. William Humes was originally from New York and arrived in the Elwha River area en route to the Klondike. William, his brother, and a cousin liked the area so much they set up homestead sites. In the early 1940s, Herb and Lois Crisler settled into the cabin at Humes Ranch, while they filmed wildlife for what became Walt Disney's film The Olympic Elk. Since acquiring the property from Peninsula Plywood, the National Park Service has restored the cabin, conforming to its original appearance and with much of the original materials. Wood deterioration, however, is occurring, as a result of the moist Olympic Peninsula environment.

The cabin is accessible via the Geyser Valley trail, approximately 3 miles from Whiskey Bend Trailhead and 1.3 miles from Goblins Gate. Just beyond the cabin lie Humes' old fields and then the trail continues for less than 0.5 miles to Dodger point bridge and the Grand Canyon of the Elwha.

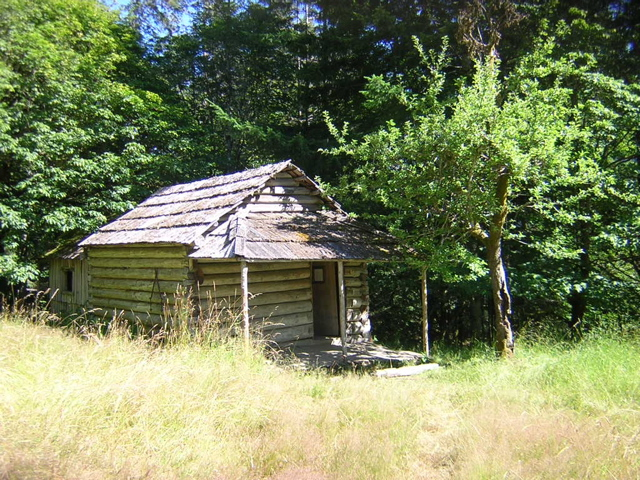
Humes Ranch Cabin and 100-year-old apple tree
