= Krause Bottom =

Coordinates: 47°57′11″N 123°34′06″W

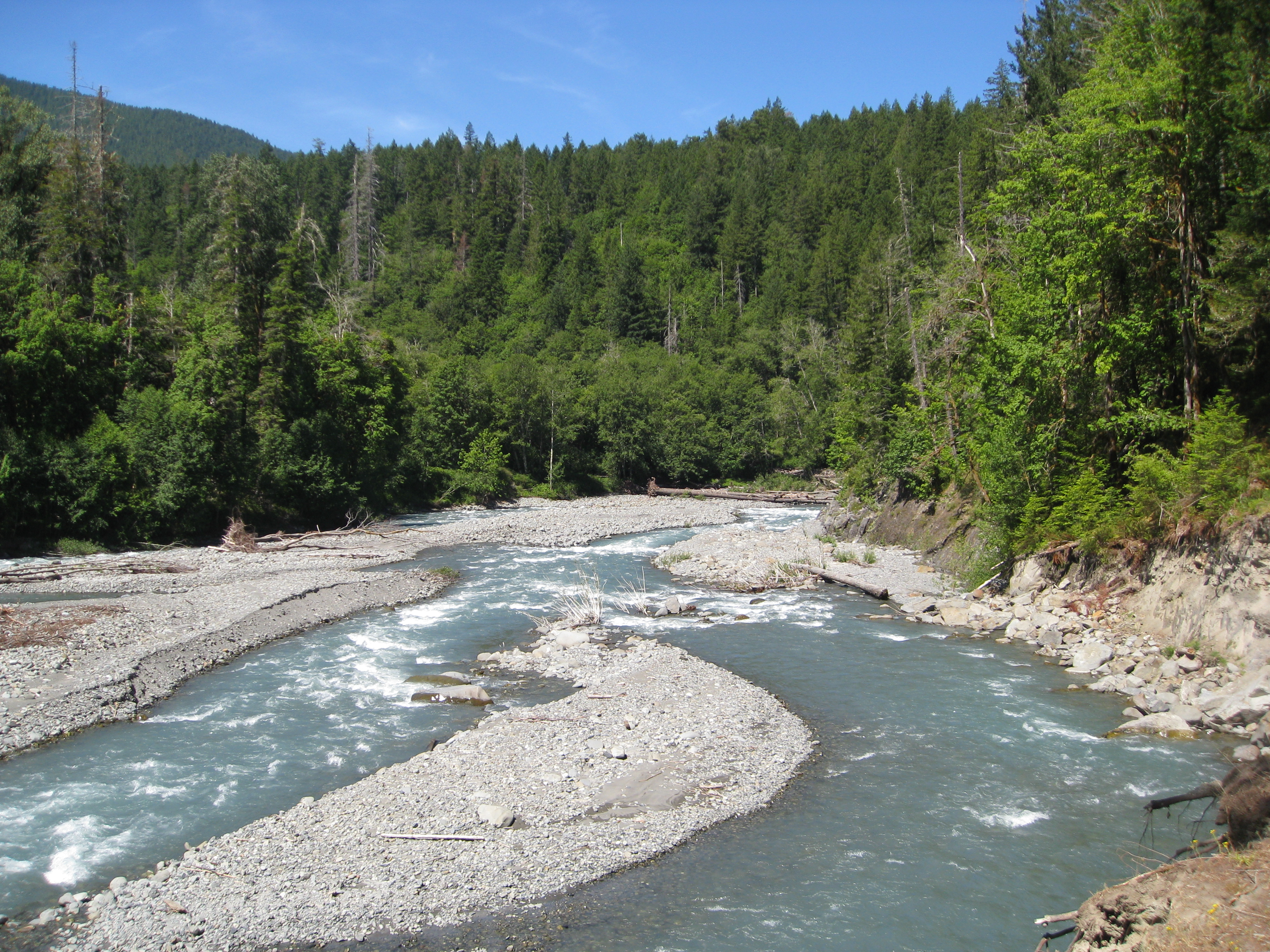
View of the Elwha River from Krause Bottom

Krause Bottom is a riparian forest area along the Elwha River on the Geyser Valley trail in Olympic National Park, Washington. It contains a forest of bigleaf maple, red alder, and black cottonwood. The surrounding area was initially cleared by homesteaders in the late 1890s, but evidence of their activities is difficult to see today.
