= Boulder Lake (Washington) =

Lake in Clallam County, Washington, United States

- Location within Washington (state) Location within the United States
- Location: Olympic National Park; Clallam County, Washington
- Coordinates: 47°58′36″N 123°44′59″W
- Basin countries: United States
- Surface elevation: 4,334 ft (1,321 m)

Boulder Lake is located in the Olympic National Park in Washington. It is accessible by the Olympic Hot Springs Trail and the Appleton Pass trail. The hike is about 12 miles (19 km) round trip and has about a 2,500-foot (760 m) elevation gain. At the lake there are a few camp sites and a bear wire to hang food. The lake lies at the base of Boulder Peak.
