= Dodger Point Bridge =

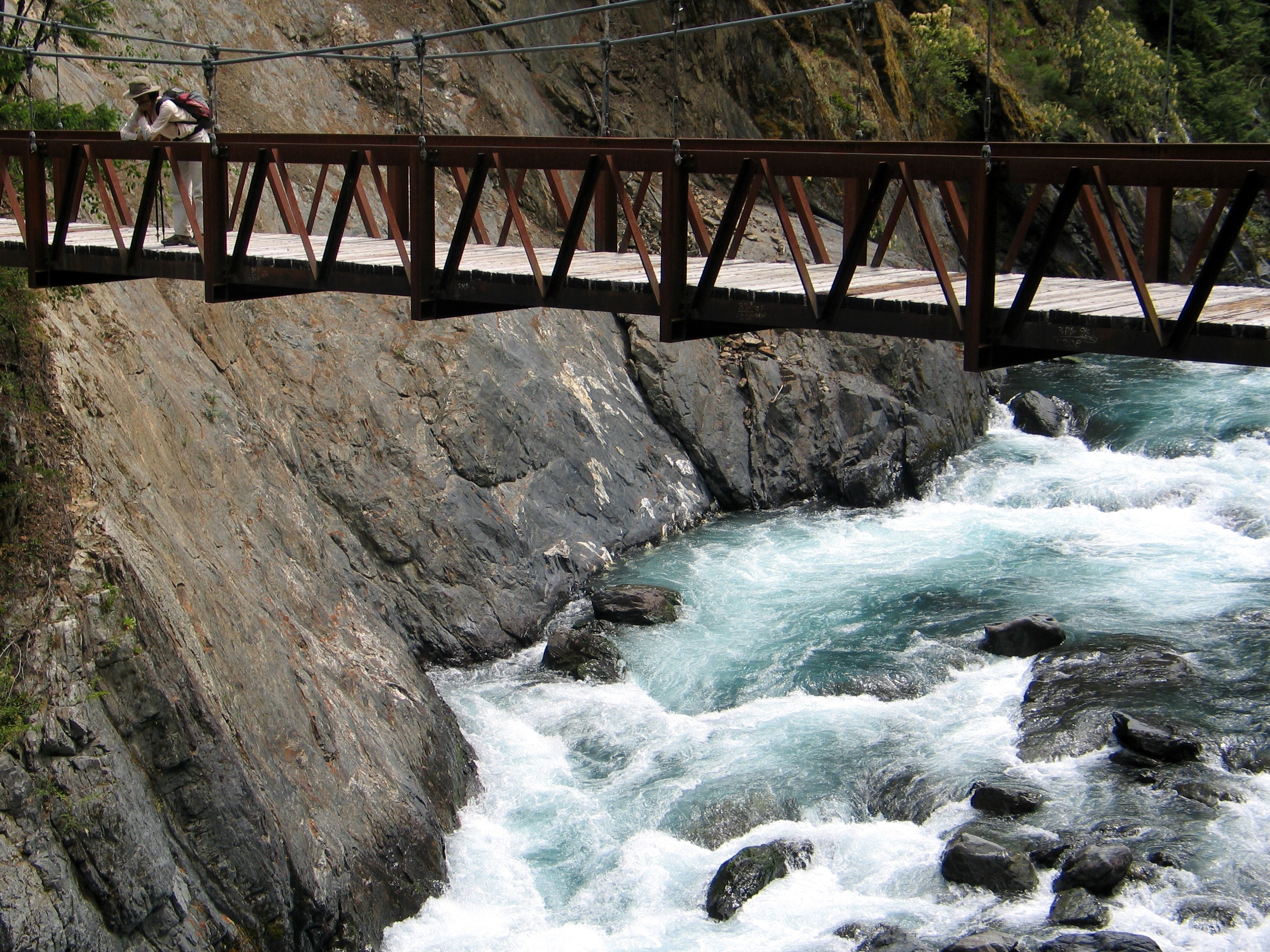
- Dodger Point Bridge at Grand Canyon of the Elwha.
- Coordinates: 47.942294°N 123.541120°W
- Carries: Pedestrians
- Crosses: Elwha River
- Locale: Elwha Valley, WA

Characteristics
- Design: Simple Suspension

Location
- Interactive map of Dodger Point Bridge

Dodger Point Bridge is a pedestrian suspension bridge 875 feet (267 m) above sea level, located above the Elwha River as it exits the Grand Canyon of the Elwha just past Humes Ranch Cabin, in Washington state, United States. It can be accessed approximate 3.5 miles (5.6 km) from the Whiskey Bend trailhead and is the point where the Geyser Valley trail ends. From the bridge, it is an 11-mile (18 km) hike up to the summit of Dodger Point at 5,753 feet (1,754 m).

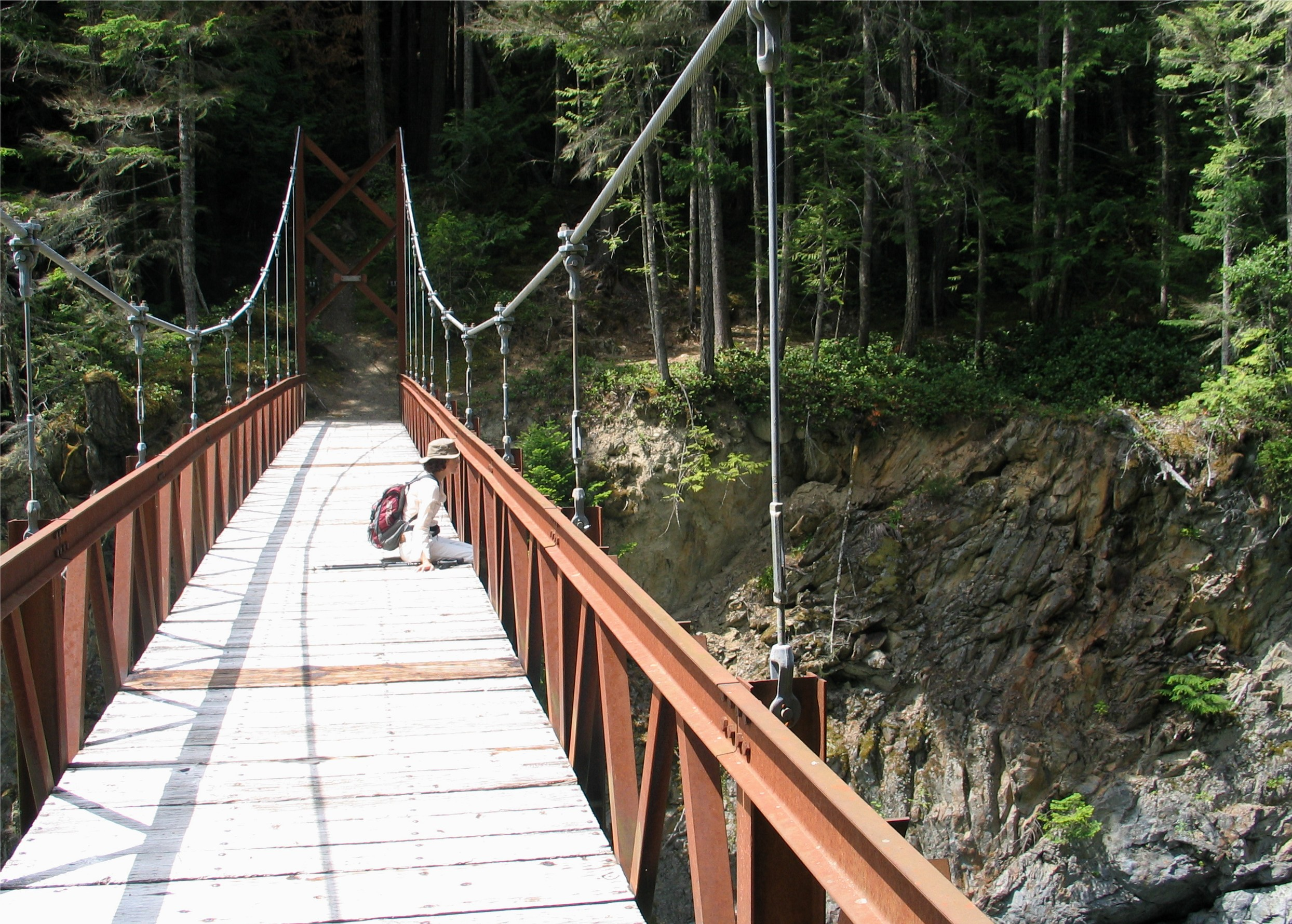
Dodger Point Bridge
