= Olympic Hot Springs =

Thermal springs in Washington state

Coordinates: 47°58′36″N 123°41′19″W

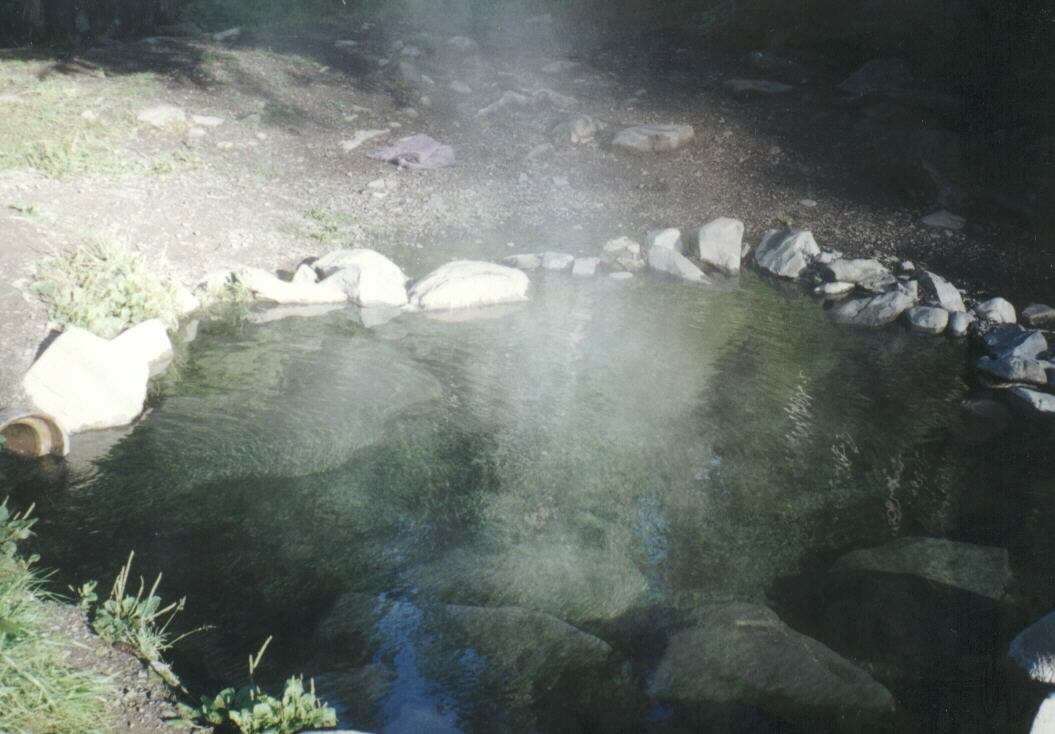
Olympic Hot Springs, October 2007

Olympic Hot Springs is located in Olympic National Park, Washington, United States. The springs contain 21 seeps near Boulder Creek, a tributary of the Elwha River. The temperature varies from tepid to 138 °F (59 °C).

== History ==
Olympic Hot Springs were used by the Klallam Tribe for centuries as a place for vision quests. With the help of a Klallam friend, Andrew Jacobsen in 1892 was the first person of European descent to make it to the hot springs. They were rediscovered in 1907, after which a trail was blazed to the springs and a resort was built.

A resort existed on the site until 1966 when its lease with the National Parks expired. Since then the site has not been developed and the buildings that existed have been removed.

Olympic Hot Springs Resort
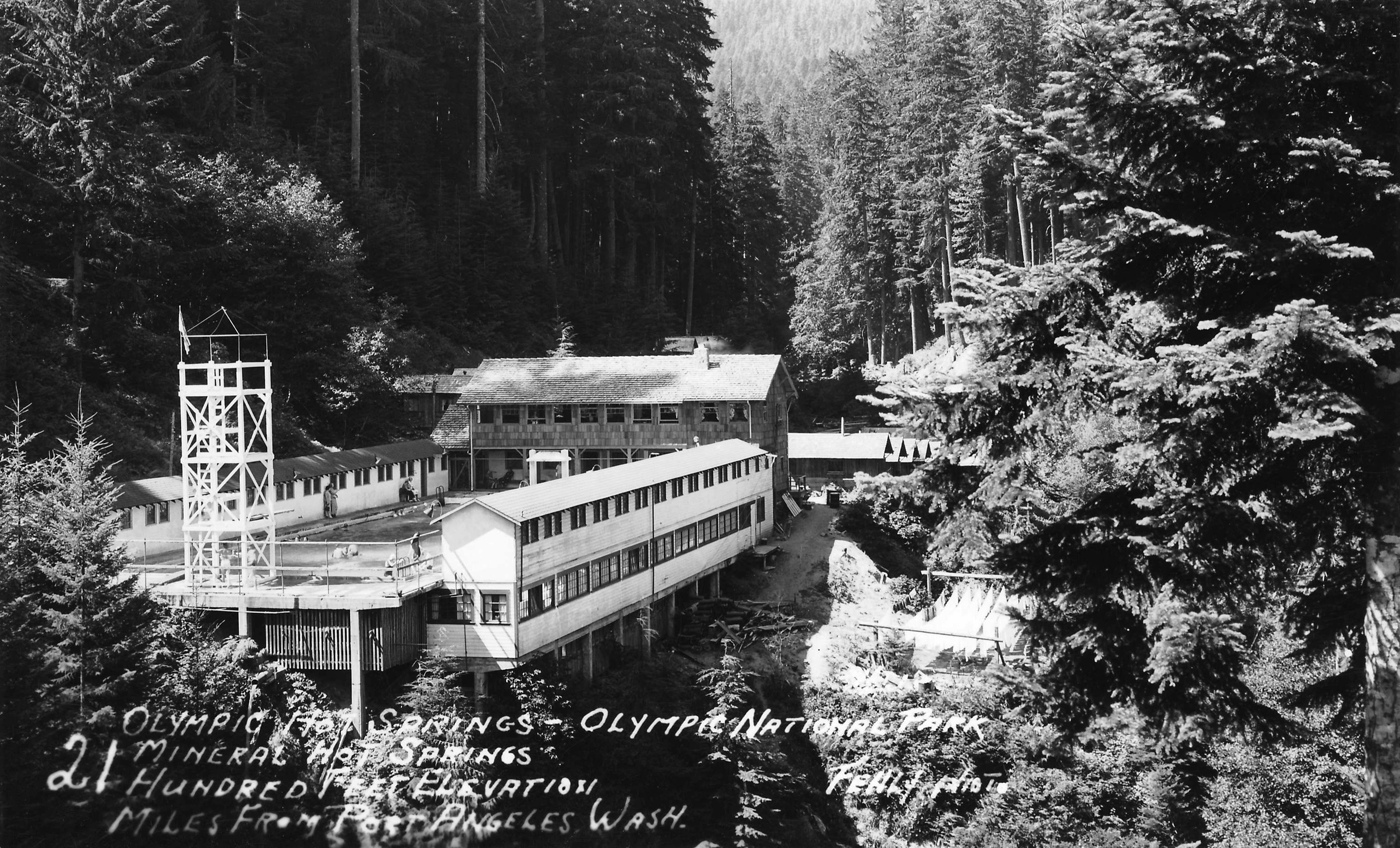
Olympic Hot Springs resort

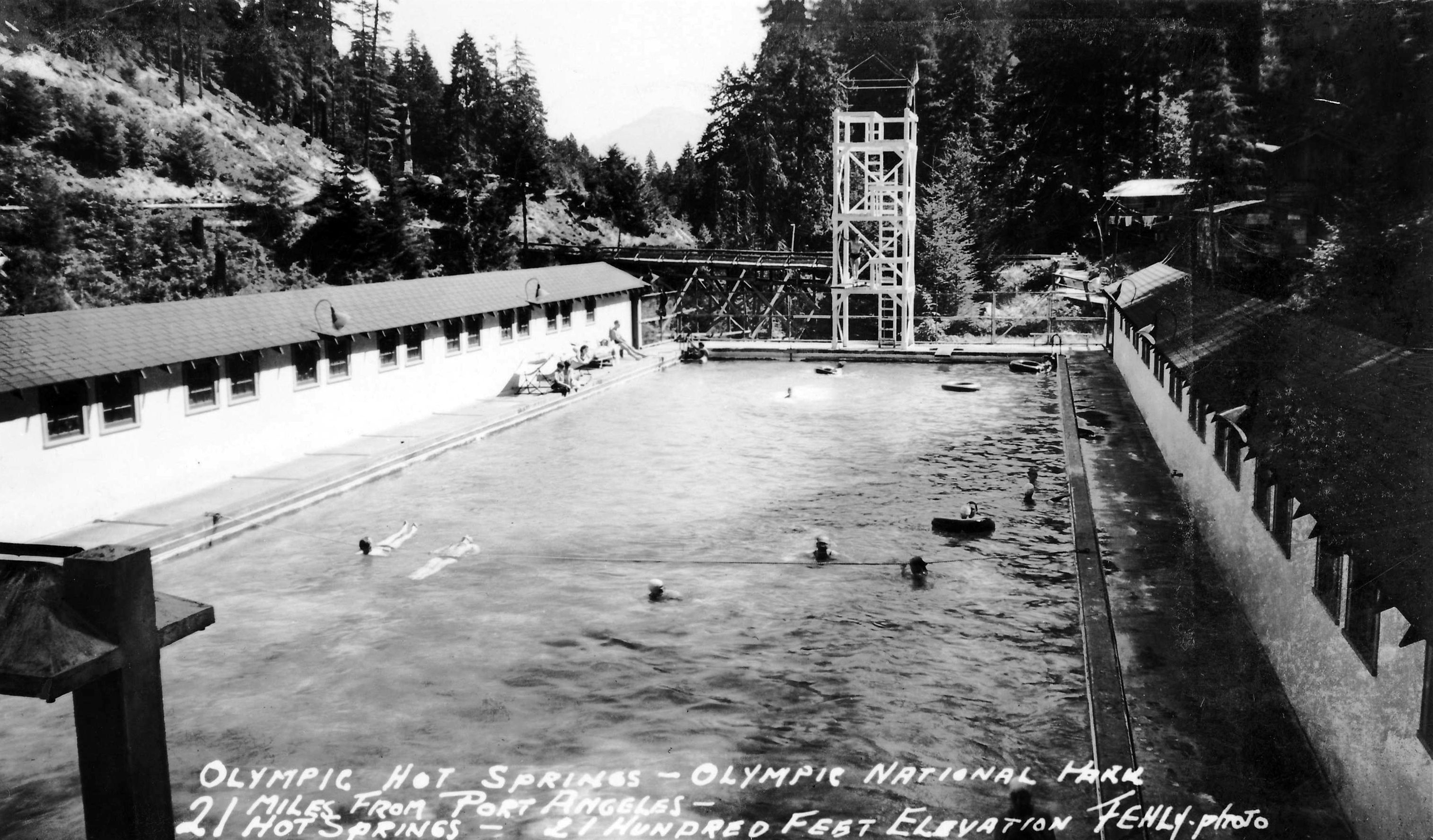
Olympic Hot Springs pool

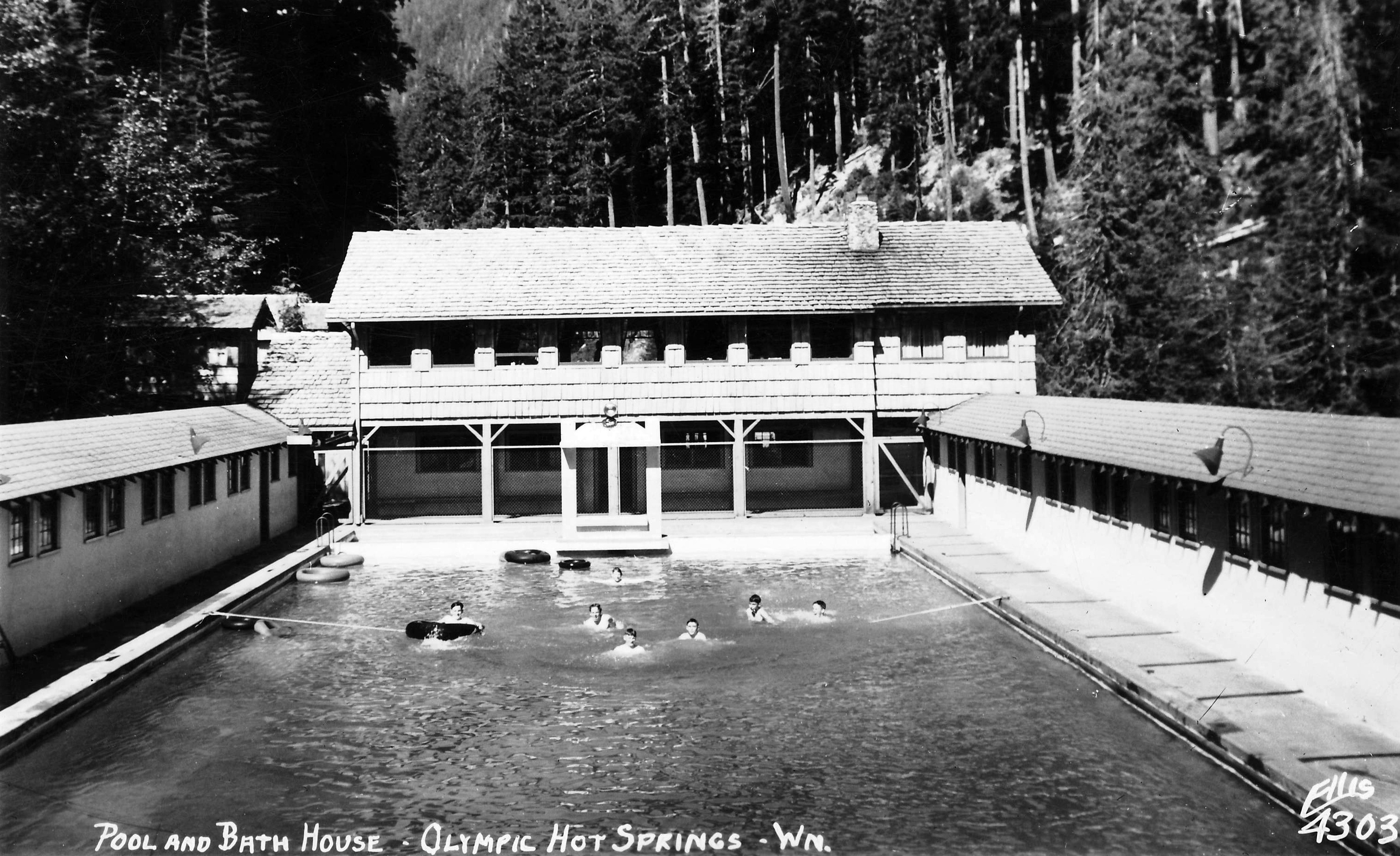
Olympic Hot Springs pool and bathhouse

== Description ==
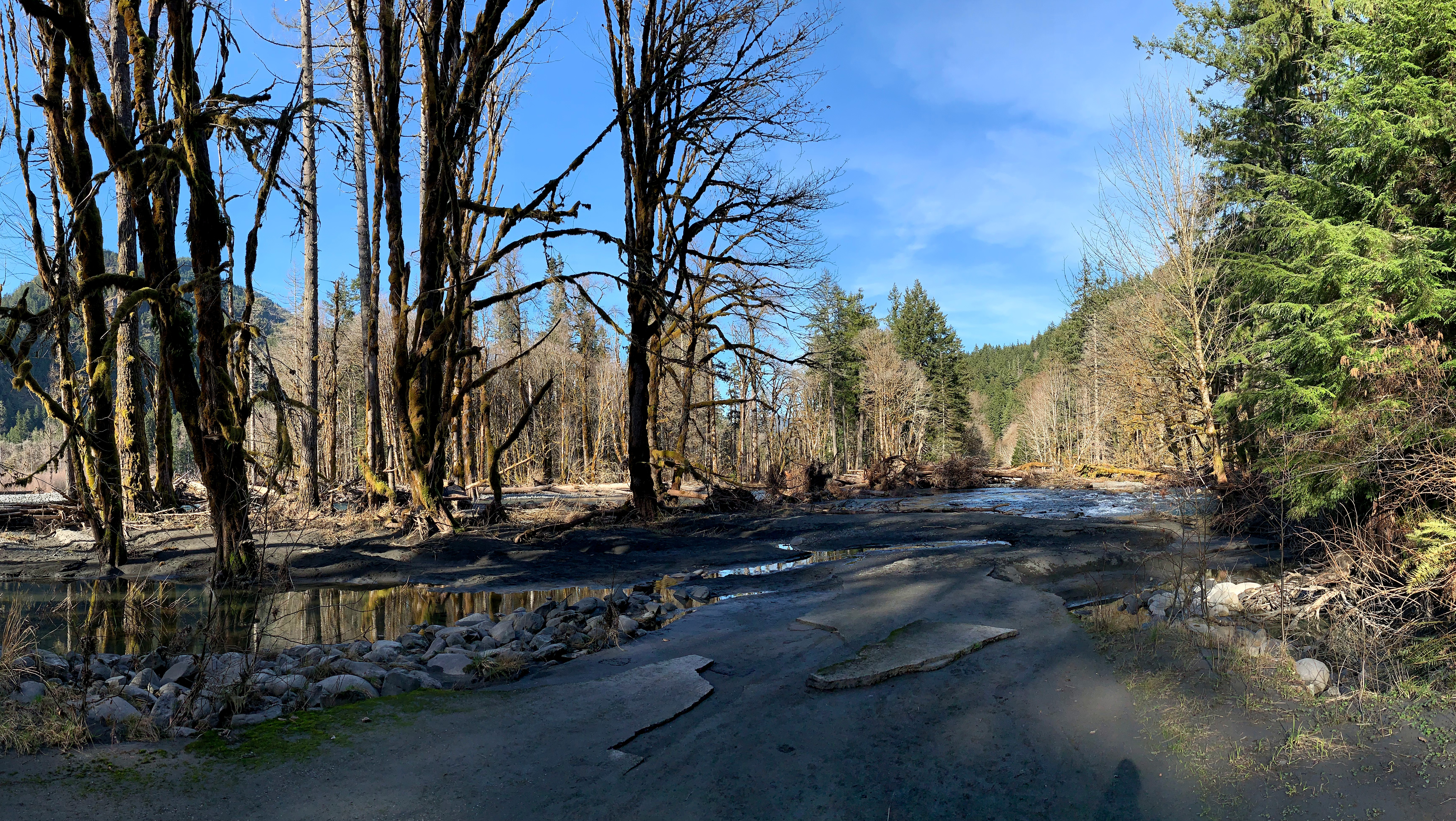
Washed out section of Olympic Hot Springs Road on the Elwha River

The spring is accessed by using the Appleton Pass Trail which is about a 2.5-mile (4.0 km) hike. In the past, it was possible to drive and park at the trailhead. However, due to the removal of the Glines Canyon Dam and subsequent road washout, the road ends at the Madison Falls Trailhead and it now must be hiked which is an additional 8 miles to the Appleton Pass trailhead. Another hot spring in the area is the developed Sol Duc Hot Springs. The springs lie on a fault and it is likely that the breaks in the rock allow surface water to be heated and driven back from the hot interior of the Earth. However, geologists say they are uncertain of the mechanism that produce the springs.

The depth of the pools averages around one foot. Some pools are deeper due to rocks being placed to block the exit of the spring water.

A sign at the Olympic Hot Springs trailhead reads:

OLYMPIC HOT SPRINGS are located approximately 2.5 miles up trail from where you are now. There are seven natural hot springs in the immediate area. The hot springs are very primitive with mud and rock bottoms and are very shallow (waist deep when sitting). The temperatures in the hot springs vary from 85 degrees to 105 degrees. These hot springs are not maintained by Olympic National Park or Clallam County Health Department. During the summer months the water in the hot springs is stagnant and does not flush itself out sufficiently; consequently the pools are very likely to be carrying infectious bacteria. Further, nudity is commonplace in the hot springs, and is not condoned by Olympic National Park. You must boil or treat all drinking water. Camping and fires are prohibited in areas near pools. Water quality tests have revealed high levels of disease bacteria in the hot springs pools after concentrated visitor use. Public health officials do not recommend bathing. BATHE AT OWN RISK.

== See also ==
- Boulder Lake (Washington)
- Boulder Peak (Washington)
