= Elwha snowfinger =

Snow field in Washington state, US

Coordinates: 47°47′54″N 123°35′29″W

The Elwha snowfinger is a perennial snow field located near the Dodwell Rixon Pass, which is 4,763 ft (1,452 m) high and separates the watersheds of the Elwha and Queets rivers in the Olympic Peninsula in Washington state in the United States. This snowfield is created by continuous winter and spring avalanches into the upper pass area. It is the source of the Elwha River.
