= Lake Mills (Washington) =

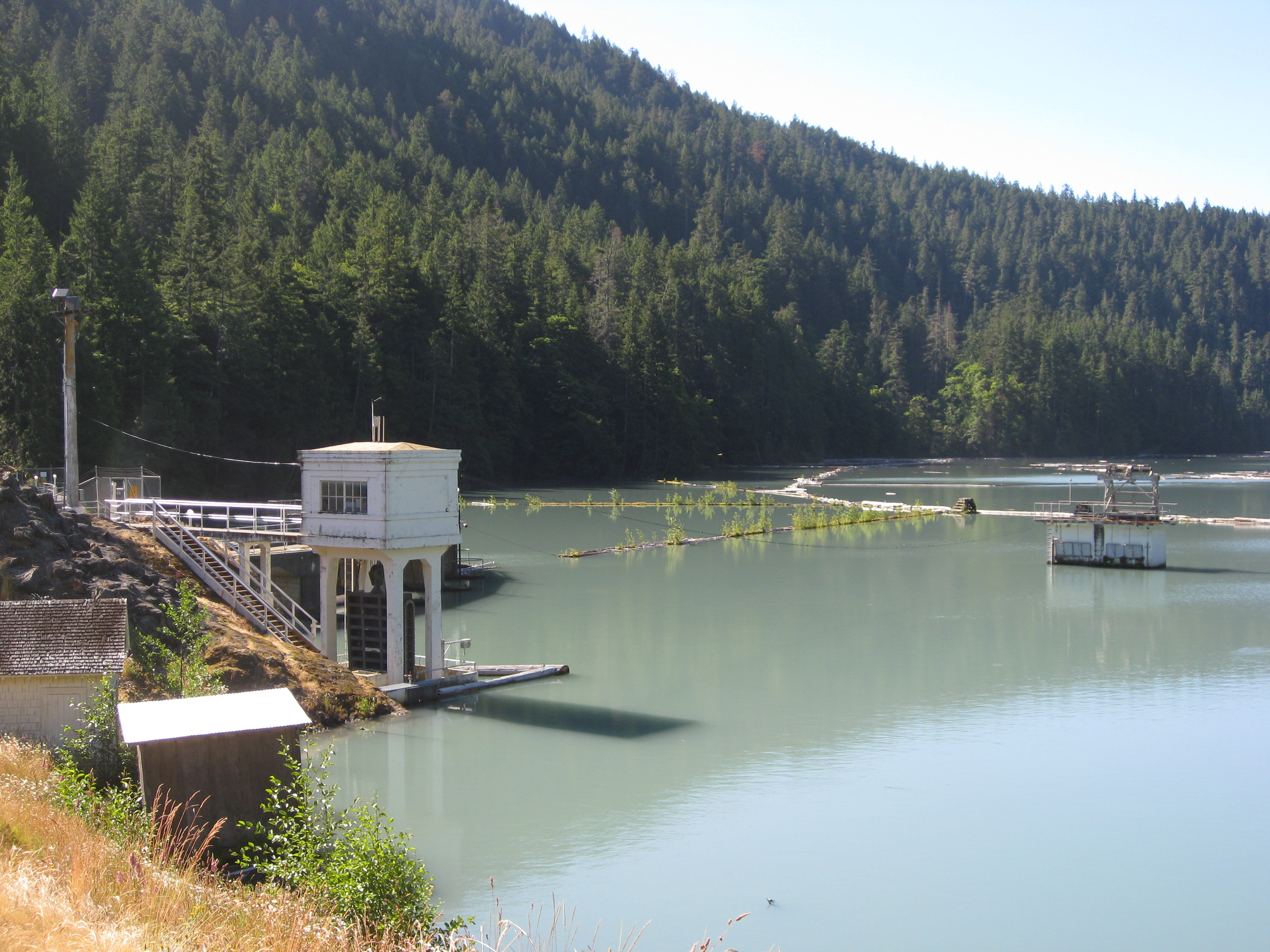
- Lake Mills

- Location within Washington (state) Location within the United States
- Location: Olympic National Park, Clallam County, Washington, US
- Coordinates: 47°59′20″N 123°36′20″W
- Type: reservoir
- Basin countries: United States
- Surface elevation: 545 ft (166 m)

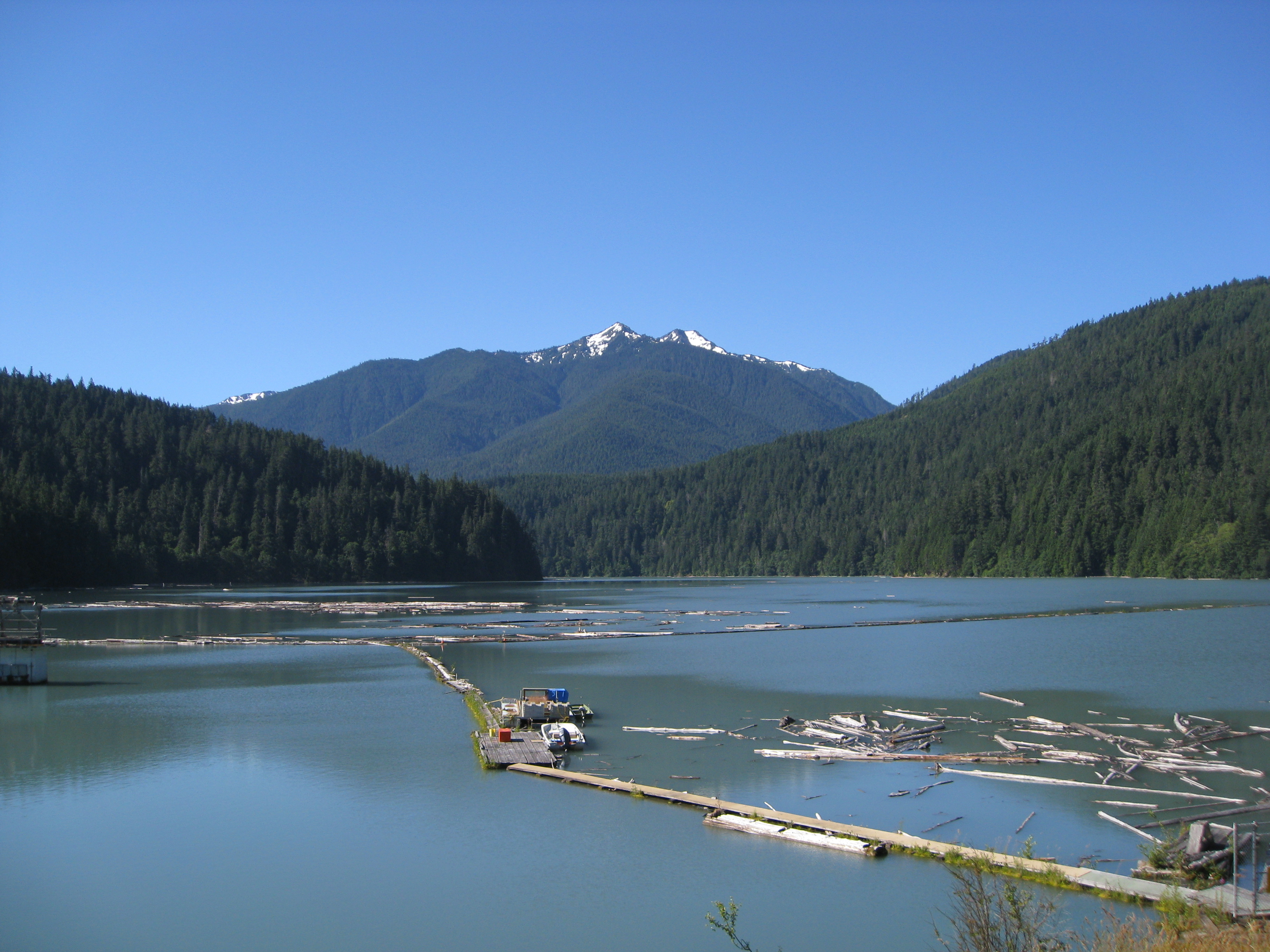
Lake Mills View

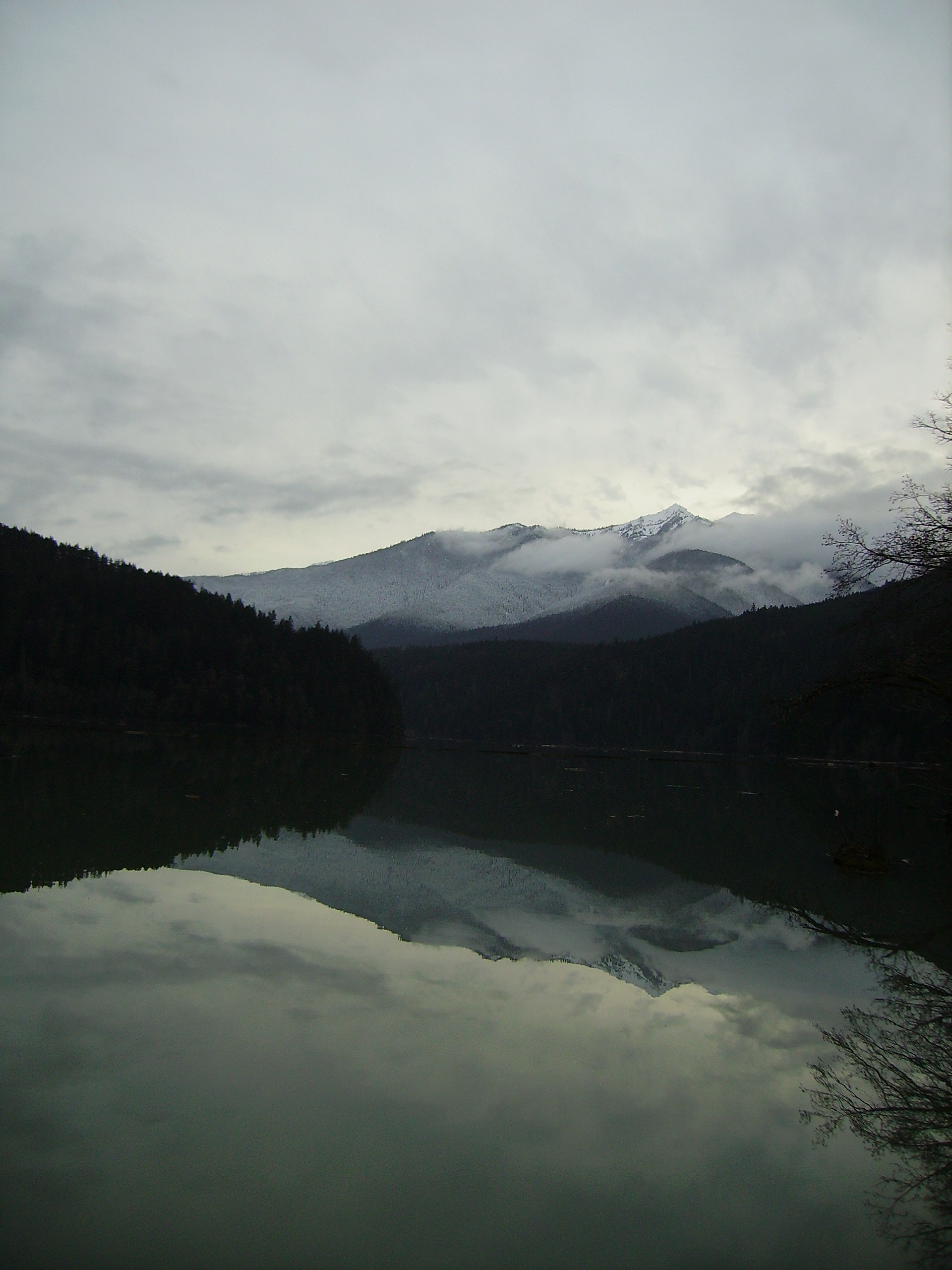
Lake Mills

Lake Mills was a reservoir in Olympic National Park, Washington, United States, that existed from 1927 to 2012. It was formed by the Glines Canyon Dam on the Elwha River and was located about 13 miles from the mouth of the river on the Olympic Peninsula.

The lake was formed in 1927 with the completion of the dam and after the lowland forest that occupied the river bottom was clear-cut. With no fish passage facilities, the dam blocked passage of anadromous Pacific Salmon from the upper 50+ miles of the Elwha watershed located within Olympic National Park.

The Elwha Ecosystem Restoration project included the removal of the Glines Canyon Dam in 2014. The lake was fully drained by October 2012, leaving only sediment upstream of the former dam site. Olympic National Park crews are revegetating the area to speed up ecological restoration and improve the habitat for the return of the salmon.

Lake Mills was a habitat for rainbow trout, bull trout, and Dolly Varden trout which used the lake as their adult habitat because the dam blocked access to the Pacific Ocean. It is expected that, following removal of the dam, these fish will return to their natural anadromous lifestyle.

== See also ==
- List of lakes of Washington
