= Elwha River =

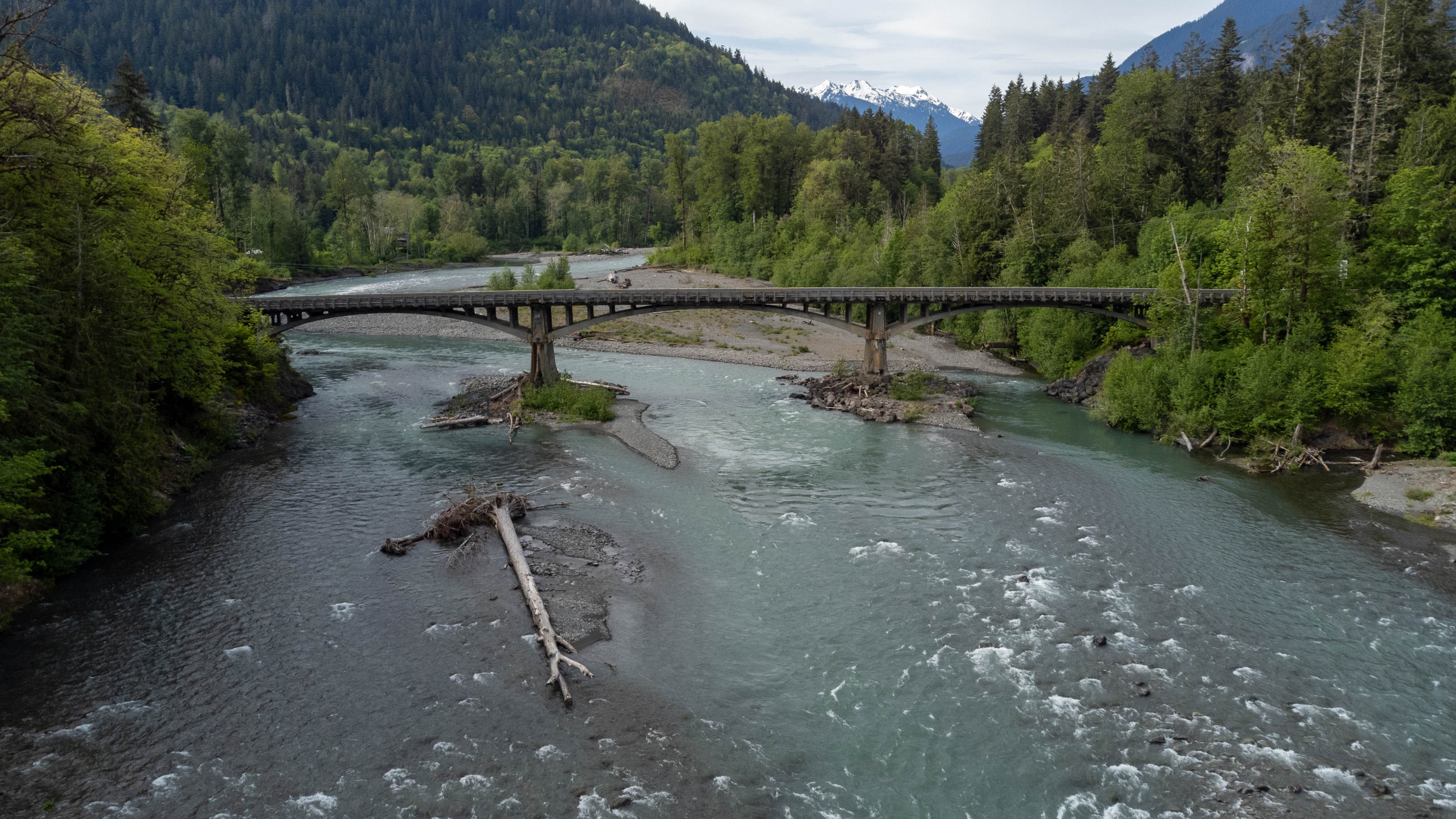
- U.S. Route 101 crossing the Elwha River with Mount Fairchild in the background

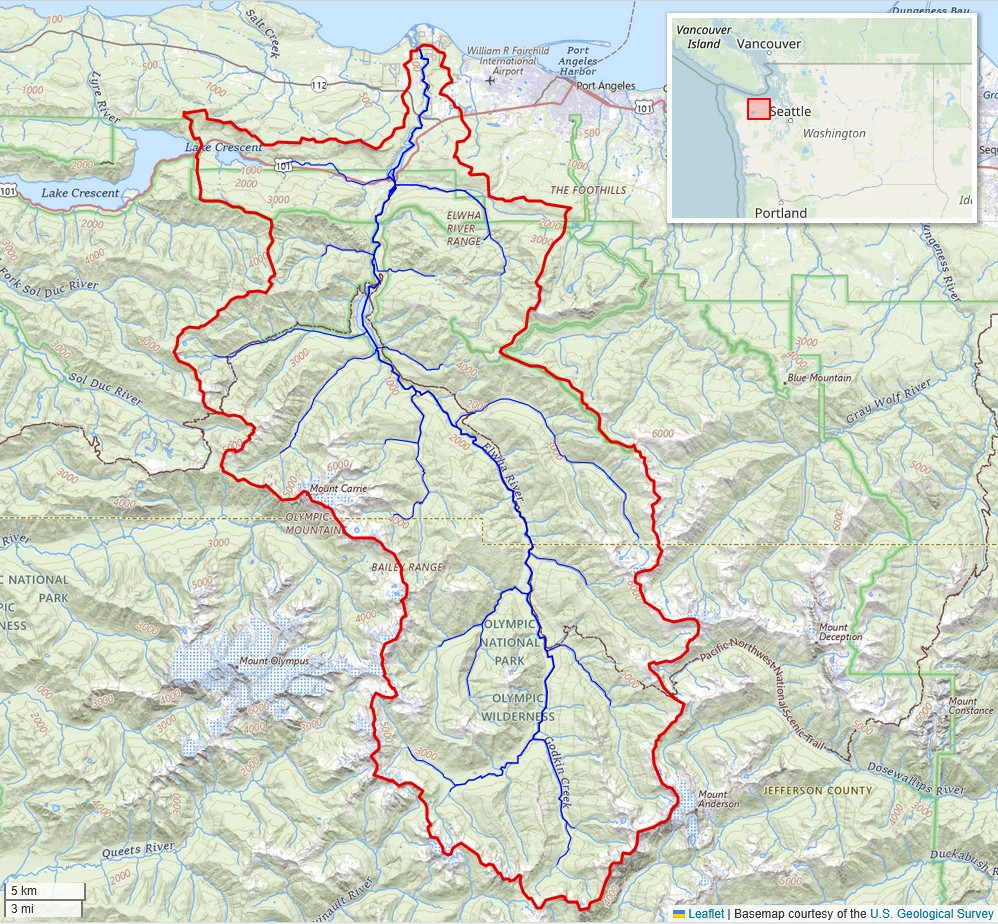
- Elwha River watershed (Interactive map)
- Native name: ʔéʔɬx̣ʷaʔ (Klallam)

Location
- Country: United States
- State: Washington
- Counties: Clallam, Jefferson
- City: Port Angeles

Physical characteristics
- Source: Olympic Range
  - coordinates: 47°46′8″N 123°34′43″W
  - elevation: 3,655 ft (1,114 m)
- Mouth: Strait of Juan de Fuca
  - coordinates: 48°9′2″N 123°33′35″W
  - elevation: 0 ft (0 m)
- Length: 45 mi (72 km)
- Basin size: 318 sq mi (820 km^{2})
- Discharge
  - location: McDonald Bridge, River mile 8.6
  - average: 1,507 cu ft/s (42.7 m^{3}/s)
  - minimum: 10 cu ft/s (0.28 m^{3}/s)
  - maximum: 41,600 cu ft/s (1,180 m^{3}/s)

Basin features
- Tributaries
  - left: Cat Creek, Goldie River, Indian Creek
  - right: Hayes River, Lost River, Lillian River, Little River

The Elwha River is a 45-mile (72 km) river on the Olympic Peninsula in the U.S. state of Washington. From its source at Elwha snowfinger in the Olympic Mountains, it flows generally north to the Strait of Juan de Fuca. Most of the river's course is within the Olympic National Park.

The Elwha is one of several rivers in the Pacific Northwest that hosts all five species of native Pacific salmon (chinook, coho, chum, sockeye, and pink salmon), plus four anadromous trout species (steelhead, coastal cutthroat trout, bull trout, and Dolly Varden char). From 1911 to 2014, dams blocked fish passage on the lower Elwha River. Before the dams, 400,000 adult salmon returned yearly to spawn in 70 miles (110 km) of river habitat. Prior to dam removal, fewer than 4,000 salmon returned each year in only 4.9 miles (7.9 km) of habitat below the lower dam. The National Park Service removed the two dams as part of the $325 million Elwha Ecosystem Restoration Project. Dam removal work began in September 2011 and was completed in August 2014. The river has already carried sediment to its mouth, creating 70 acres of estuary habitat at the Strait of Juan de Fuca.

The first documented use of the name Elwha River dates to Henry Kellett's 1846 map.

== Course ==
The Elwha River flowing by the Madison Falls Trailhead in Olympic National Park.

The Elwha River begins at the Elwha snowfinger near Mount Barnes and Mount Queets in the Olympic Range within Olympic National Park, in Jefferson County, Washington. The river flows southeast, then curves northward for the great majority of its course, with its mouth at the Strait of Juan de Fuca. Major peaks near the Elwha's source include Mount Queets, Mount Christie, Mount Meany, Mount Noyes, and Mount Seattle.

After receiving the tributaries Delabarre and Godkin creeks, the Elwha River flows northward. The Hayes River joins in Press Valley, where the Hayes River Ranger Station is located. Lost River joins near the northern end of Press Valley, after which the Elwha crosses into Clallam County, Washington.

Just after the county line, the Elwha River passes the Elkhorn Ranger Station and enters the Grand Canyon of the Elwha. As the river leaves the Grand Canyon, it is crossed by Dodger Point Bridge. Humes Ranch Cabin is located near the river along the Geyser Valley trail. After passing Krause Bottom, the river enters Rica Canyon at Goblins Gate. Prior to dam removal, the river fanned out into a delta below Rica Canyon, at the head of Lake Mills, the reservoir behind Glines Canyon Dam. Below the dam site, the Elwha is paralleled by Olympic Hot Springs Road. The river receives a tribunate from the Madison creek. The trailhead for Madison Creek Falls is also along the river. Campgrounds and the Elwha Ranger Station are located along the river before it exits Olympic National Park. Until early 2012, when Lake Aldwell was drained, the river entered this reservoir behind Elwha Dam.

Downriver from the former site of the Elwha Dam, the Elwha River flows several miles north through the Elwha Canyon and the Lower Elwha Indian Reservation, to enter the Strait of Juan de Fuca at Angeles Point, just west of the city of Port Angeles, Washington.

Since 2014, the Elhwa is a free-flowing river, with no man-made dams in the watershed.

== Dams ==
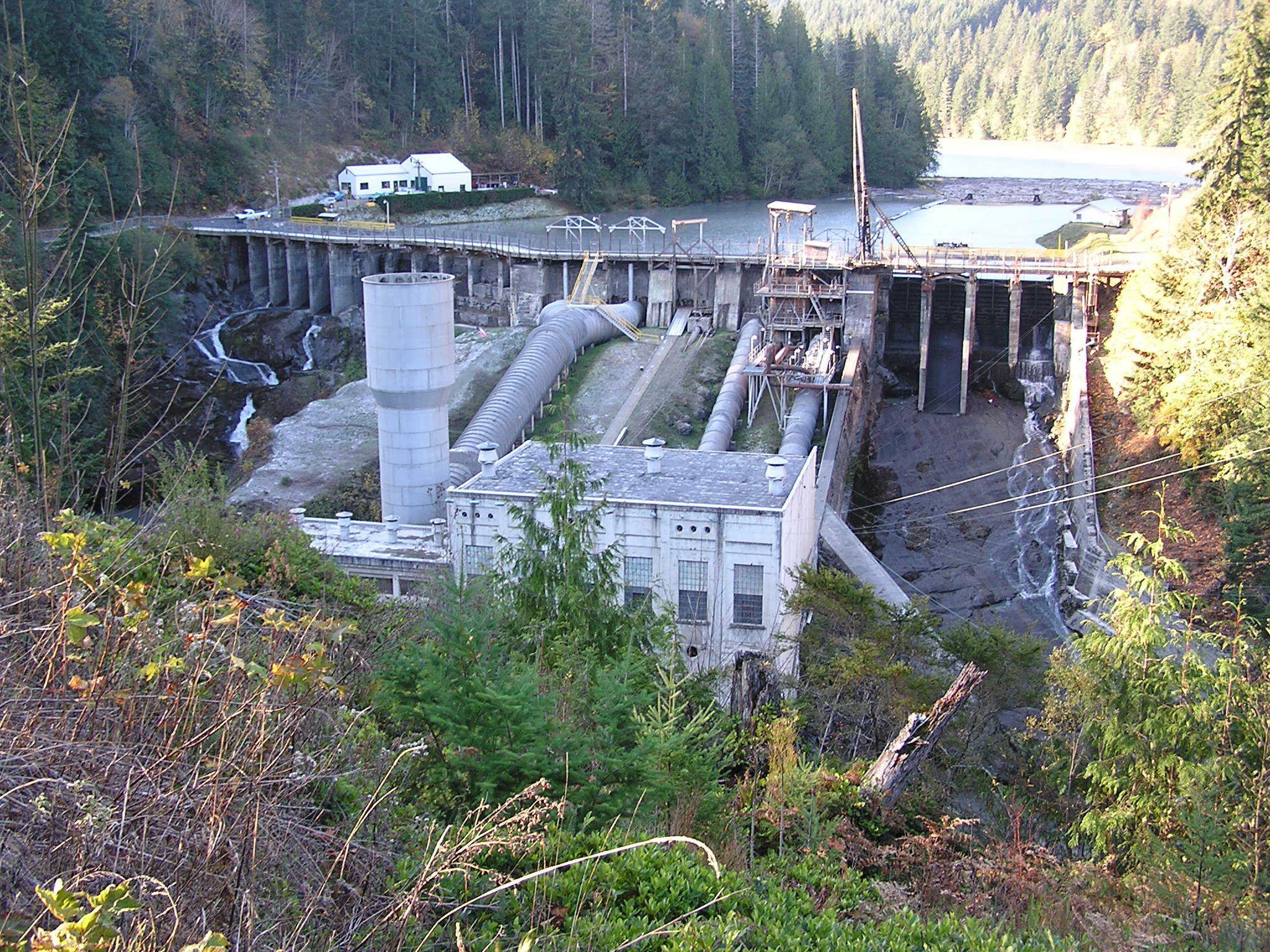
Elwha Dam with Lake Aldwell behind. The power house can be seen in the center.

The undamming of the Elwha was, at the time, the largest dam removal project in history. The Elwha Ecosystem Restoration project is the second largest ecosystem restoration project the National Park Service has attempted, after the Everglades. The Elwha River Ecosystem and Fisheries Restoration Act of 1992 was signed by the first President Bush after it was passed by Congress. The project was projected to cost $350 million. The act authorized the Secretary of the Interior to acquire and remove the two dams on the river and restore the ecosystem and native anadromous fisheries.

The removal of the 108-foot (33 m) tall Elwha Dam and the 210-foot (64 m) tall Glines Canyon Dam began in September 2011. Two downstream water treatment facilities were completed in early 2010 to protect the water supply for the city of Port Angeles and the fish hatcheries from silt and sediment that would wash downstream once the dams were removed. In order to protect fish stocks below the dams during removal, the dams were taken out over a three-year period, pausing to ensure there would be no silt in the river while salmon spawned downstream.

The Elwha Dam was completely dismantled in March 2012. Restoration of the area around the dam followed, including tens of thousands of native plants started in local greenhouses. The removal of the Glines Canyon Dam was completed in August 2014.

Salmon will naturally recolonize the 70 miles (110 km) of habitat in Olympic National Park. The area once under the reservoirs is being revegetated to prevent erosion and speed up ecological restoration of the area. Because almost all of the Elwha's watershed is in a national park, the river should become relatively pristine, with few of the issues of agricultural runoff and water heating that affect other salmon river habitat in the Pacific Northwest. Model projections by the Park Service show that up to 392,000 fish will fill 70 miles of habitat, theoretically matching the "pre-dam peak".

By late December 2012, about 10 percent of the estimated 25,000,000 cubic yards (19,000,000 m^{3}) of sediment that had been caught behind the river's two dams had collected at the Elwha's mouth, forming sandbars. With the Elwha Dam removed, the sediment had been pushed downstream as heavy rainfall produced faster-moving flows in the free-running river. By November 2014, 30 percent of the stored sediment had been carried to the mouth of the river, creating 70 acres (28 hectares) of new estuary habitat for a wide variety of shellfish and other species.

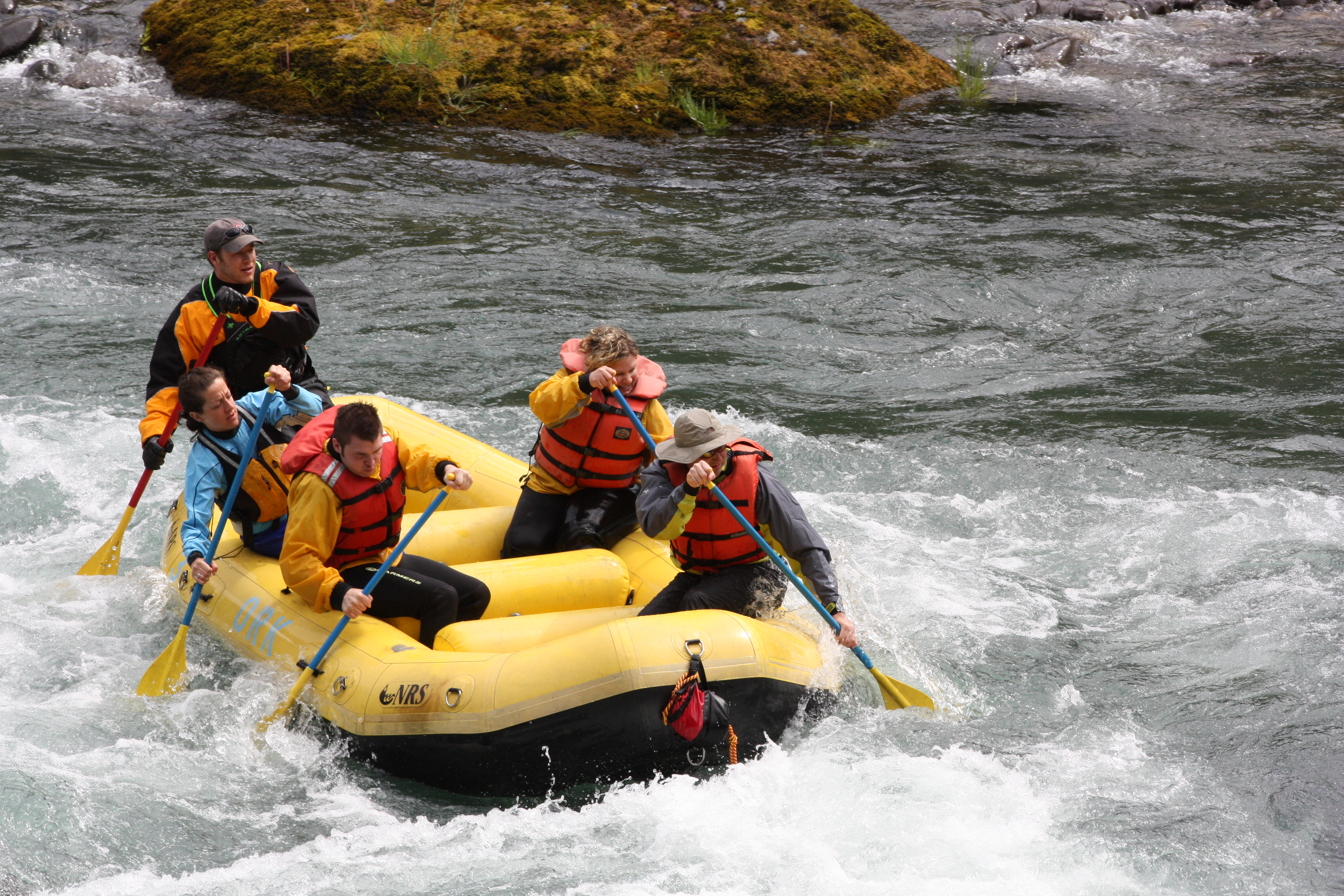
The lower Elwha (below the former Aldwell Reservoir) is rated class II.

== See also ==
- List of Washington rivers
