= Rocky Peak (Washington) =

Mountain in Washington (state), United States

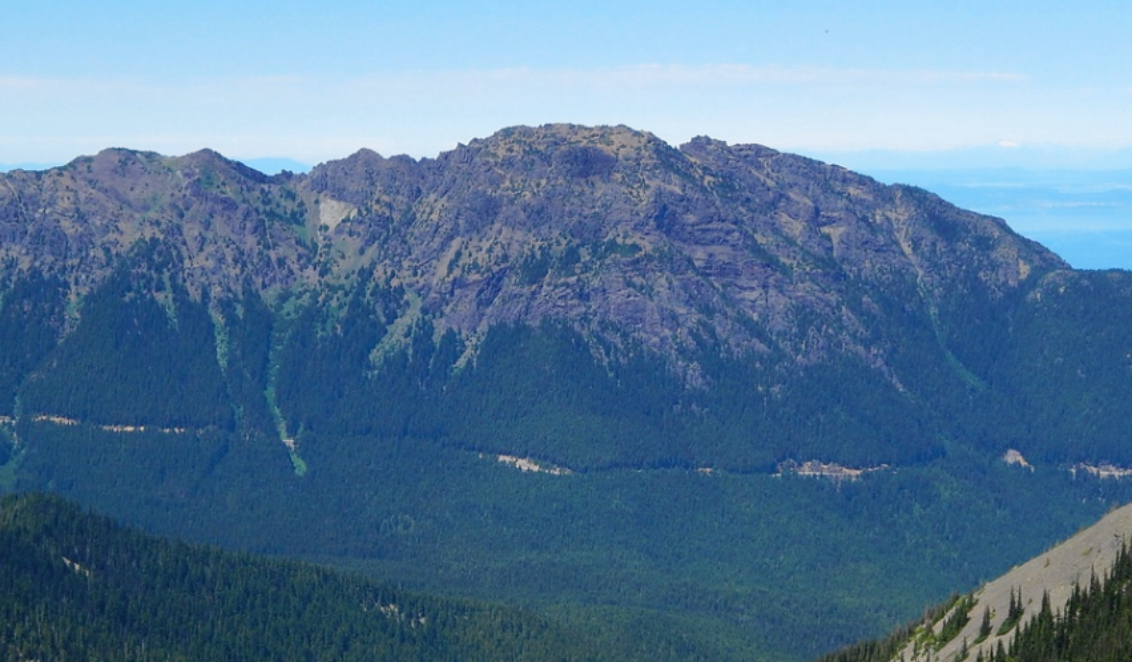
- Rocky Peak seen from Eagle Point

Highest point
- Elevation: 6,218 ft (1,895 m)
- Prominence: 538 ft (164 m)
- Parent peak: Mount Angeles (6,454 ft)
- Isolation: 2.08 mi (3.35 km)
- Coordinates: 47°59′45″N 123°25′20″W

Geography
- Location within Washington (state) Location within the United States
- Country: United States
- State: Washington
- County: Clallam
- Protected area: Olympic National Park
- Parent range: Olympic Mountains
- Topo map: USGS Mount Angeles

Geology
- Rock age: Eocene

Climbing
- Easiest route: Scrambling class 3

Rocky Peak is a 6,218-foot-elevation (1,895-meter) mountain summit in the Olympic Mountains and is located in Clallam County of Washington state. It is situated eight miles south of Port Angeles, Washington, within Olympic National Park. The nearest higher neighbor is Mount Angeles, 1.87 mi (3.01 km) to the west. Klahhane Ridge connects these two peaks. Travelers on the scenic Hurricane Ridge Road traverse the lower south slope of Rocky Peak en route to the Hurricane Ridge visitor center. The mountain was named Rocky Peak by local people from the time of the earliest settlers in the area. Precipitation runoff from the north side of the peak drains into Rocky Creek, whereas the south slope drains into Morse Creek, thence into the Strait of Juan de Fuca.

== Climate ==
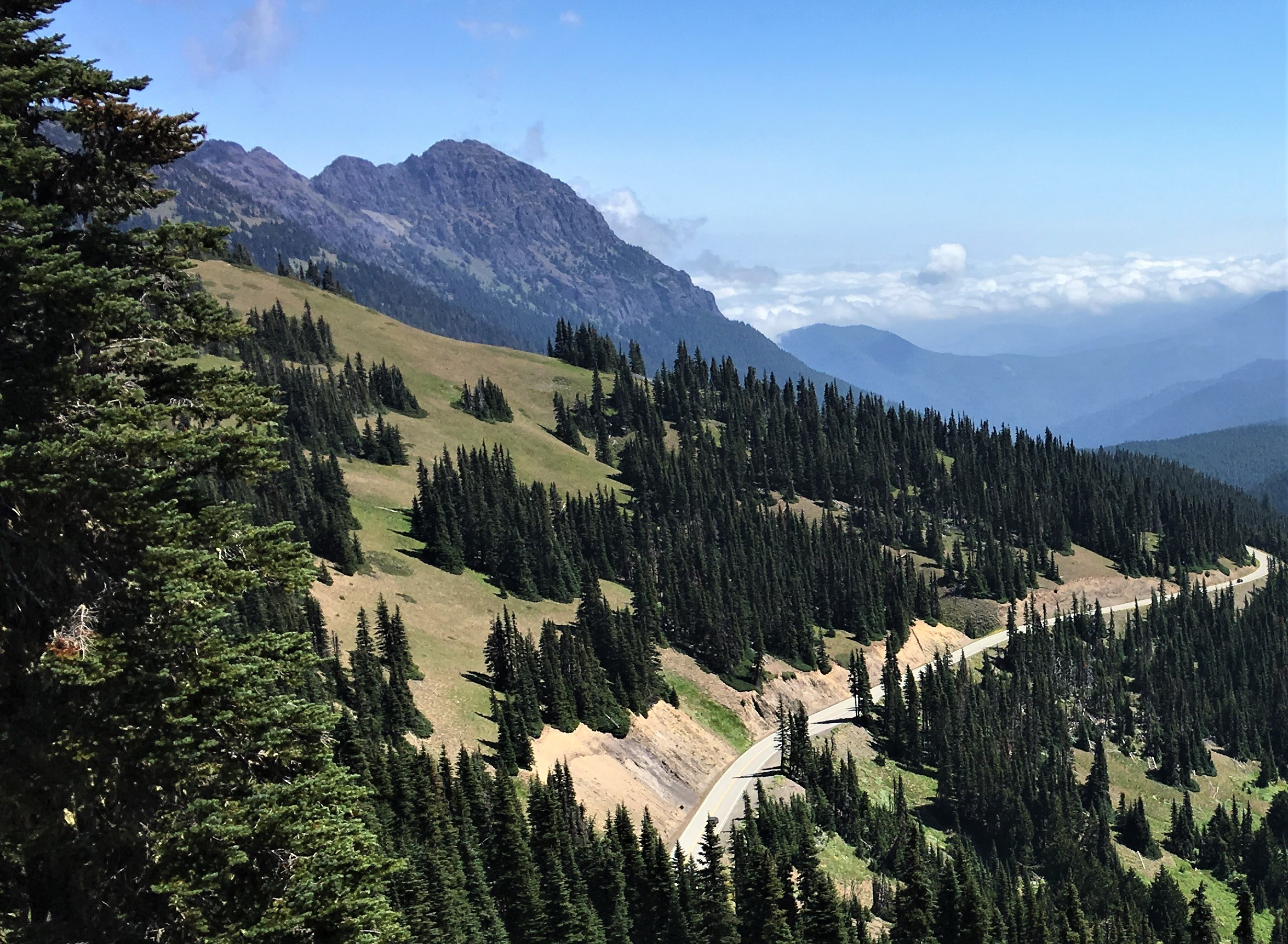
Rocky Peak from southwest

Set in the north-central portion of the Olympic Mountains, Rocky Peak is located in the marine west coast climate zone of western North America. Weather fronts originating in the Pacific Ocean travel northeast toward the Olympic Mountains. As fronts approach, they are forced upward by the peaks (orographic lift), causing them to drop their moisture in the form of rain or snow. As a result, the Olympics experience high precipitation, especially during the winter months in the form of snowfall. Because of maritime influence, snow tends to be wet and heavy, resulting in avalanche danger. During winter months weather is usually cloudy, but due to high pressure systems over the Pacific Ocean that intensify during summer months, there is often little or no cloud cover during the summer.

== Geology ==
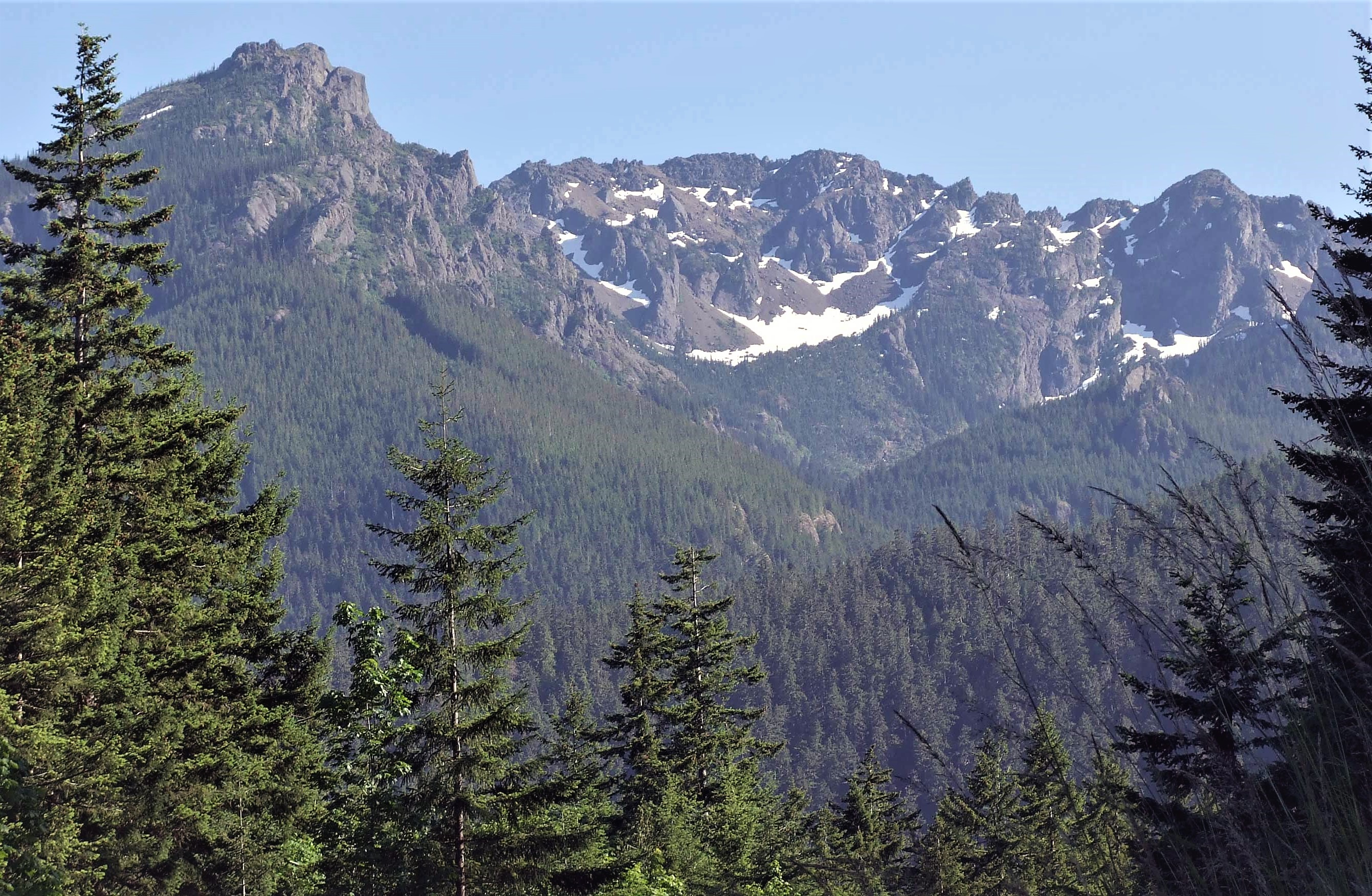
North aspect, from Port Angeles

The Olympic Mountains are composed of obducted clastic wedge material and oceanic crust, primarily Eocene sandstone, turbidite, and basaltic oceanic crust. The mountains were sculpted during the Pleistocene era by erosion and glaciers advancing and retreating multiple times.

== See also ==
- Geology of the Pacific Northwest
