= Trails of Olympic National Park =

There are many diverse trails within Olympic National Park. These trails traverse many different biomes, allowing hikers to explore from the coast of the Pacific Ocean to the summit of Mount Olympus. The trails vary in length from less than a mile and a few minutes hike to many miles and multiple days. The Pacific Northwest National Scenic Trail traverses the park from east to west, and has approximately 135 miles within its borders. The trails are divided into five separate areas, Staircase/Dosewallips Trails, Hurricane/Elwha Trails, Quinault/ Queets Trails, Hoh/Bogachiel/Sol Duc Trails, and Coastal Routes.

== Staircase/Dosewallips Trails ==
- North Fork Skokomish River Trail
- Wagonwheel Lake Trail
- Home Sweet Home Trail
- Flapjack Lakes Trail
- Upper Lena Lake Trail
- Gladys Divide Primitive Trail
- Black & White Lakes Primitive Trail
- Smith Lake Primitive Trail
- Six Ridge Primitive Trail
- Putvin Primitive Trail
- Duckabush River Trail
- Lake Constance Trail
- West Fork Dosewallips River Trail
- LaCrosse Pass Trail
- Anderson Moraine Trail
- Main Fork Dosewallips River Trail
- Dosewallips River Trail
- Constance Pass Trail
- Lost Pass Primitive Trail
- Gray Wolf Pass Trail

== Hurricane Ridge/Elwha Trails ==
- Royal Basin Trail
- Three Forks Trail
- Upper Gray Wolf River Trail
- Cedar Lake Way Trail
- Cameron Creek Trail
- Grand Pass Trail
- Cameron Pass Trail
- Cameron-Lost Pass Primitive Trail
- Deer Ridge Trail
- Badger Valley Trail
- Elk Mountain Primitive Trail
- Obstruction Point-Deer Park Trail
- PJ Lake Primitive Trail
- Cox Valley Primitive Trail
- Lake Angeles Trail
- Heather Park Trail
- Switchback Trail
- Hurricane Klahhane Ridge Trail
- Wolf Creek Trail
- Little River Trail
- Elwha to Hurricane Hill Trail
- Heart O' The Forest Trail
- Griff Creek Trail
- Elwha River Trail
- Humes Ranch Loop
- Lillian River Trail
- Hayden Pass Trail
- Dodger Point Primitive Trail
- Elwha Basin Way Trail
- Happy Hollow Trail
- Happy Lake Ridge Trail
- Olympic Hot Springs Trail
- Appleton Pass Trail
- Boulder Lake Trail
- West Elwha Trail
- Upper Lake Mills Trail Whiskey Bend Road to Lake Mills
- West Lake Mills Trail

== Quinault/Queets Trails ==
- Irely Lake Trail
- Big Creek Trail
- Three Lakes Trail
- Skyline Primitive Trail
- Elip Creek Trail
- Martin's Park Primitive Trail
- North Fork Quinault River Trail
- East Fork Quinault River Trail
- O'Neil Pass Trail
- Graves Creek Primitive Trail JCT
- Wynoochee Pass Trail
- South Fork Skokomish River Trail
- Queets River Trail

== Hoh/Bogachiel/Sol Duc Trails ==
- Mt. Storm King Trail
- Upper Barnes Creek Primitive Trail
- Aurora Divide Trail
- Aurora Creek Trail
- Aurora Ridge Trail
- Pyramid Peak Trail
- Spruce Railroad Trail

== Coastal Routes ==
- North Shi Shi Access Trail
- Shi Shi to Ozette River Beach Route
- Cape Alava to Ozette River Beach Route
- Cape Alava to Sand Point Beach Route
- Sand Point Trail
- North Coast Beach Route
- Erickson's Bay Primitive Trail
- Second Beach Trail
- Third Beach Trail
- South Coast Beach Route
- Oil City Trail
