= Mount Angeles =

Mountain in Washington (state), United States

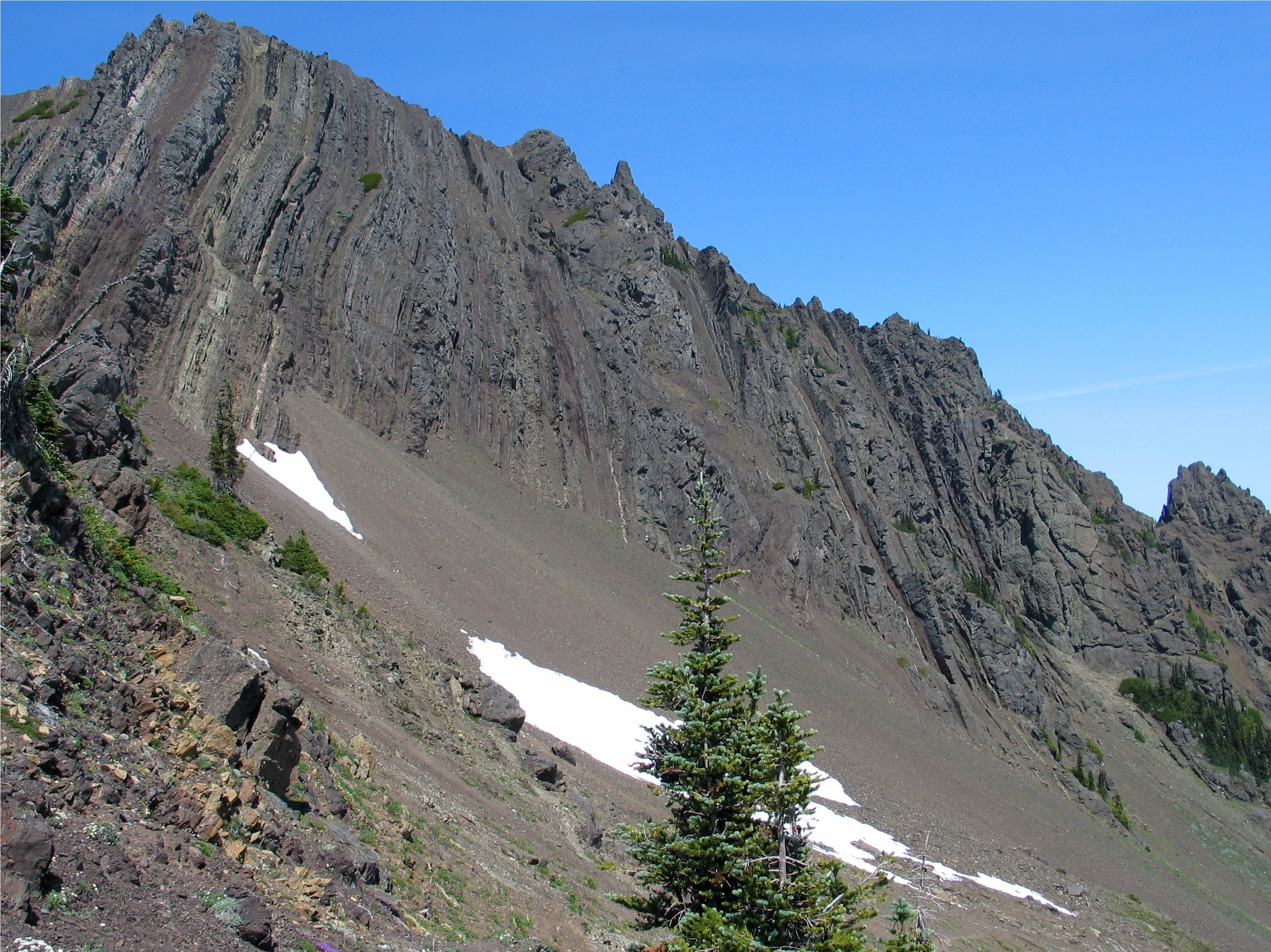

Highest point
- Elevation: 6,454 ft (1,967 m) NGVD 29
- Prominence: 1,614 ft (492 m)
- Coordinates: 47°59′43″N 123°28′00″W

Geography
- Location within Washington (state)
- Location: Clallam County, Washington, U.S.
- Parent range: Olympic Mountains
- Topo map: USGS Mount Angeles

Climbing
- Easiest route: Exposed Scramble, grade II, class 3-4

Mount Angeles is located just south of Port Angeles, Washington in the Olympic National Park. It is the highest peak in the Hurricane Ridge area. The summit, which offers panoramic views of the Strait of Juan de Fuca and many of the peaks of the interior Olympic Mountains can be climbed from the Klahane Ridge trail.

The southeast side of Mount Angeles drains into Morse Creek, thence into the Strait of Juan de Fuca a couple of miles east of Port Angeles. The northeast side of Mount Angeles drains into Ennis Creek, thence into Port Angeles Harbor. The north and west sides of Mount Angeles drain into the South Branch of Little River, thence into the Juan de Fuca Strait via the Elwha River, whose mouth is located in the Lower Elwha Indian Reservation, a few miles west of Port Angeles.

== Climate ==
Mount Angeles is located in the marine west coast climate zone of western North America.

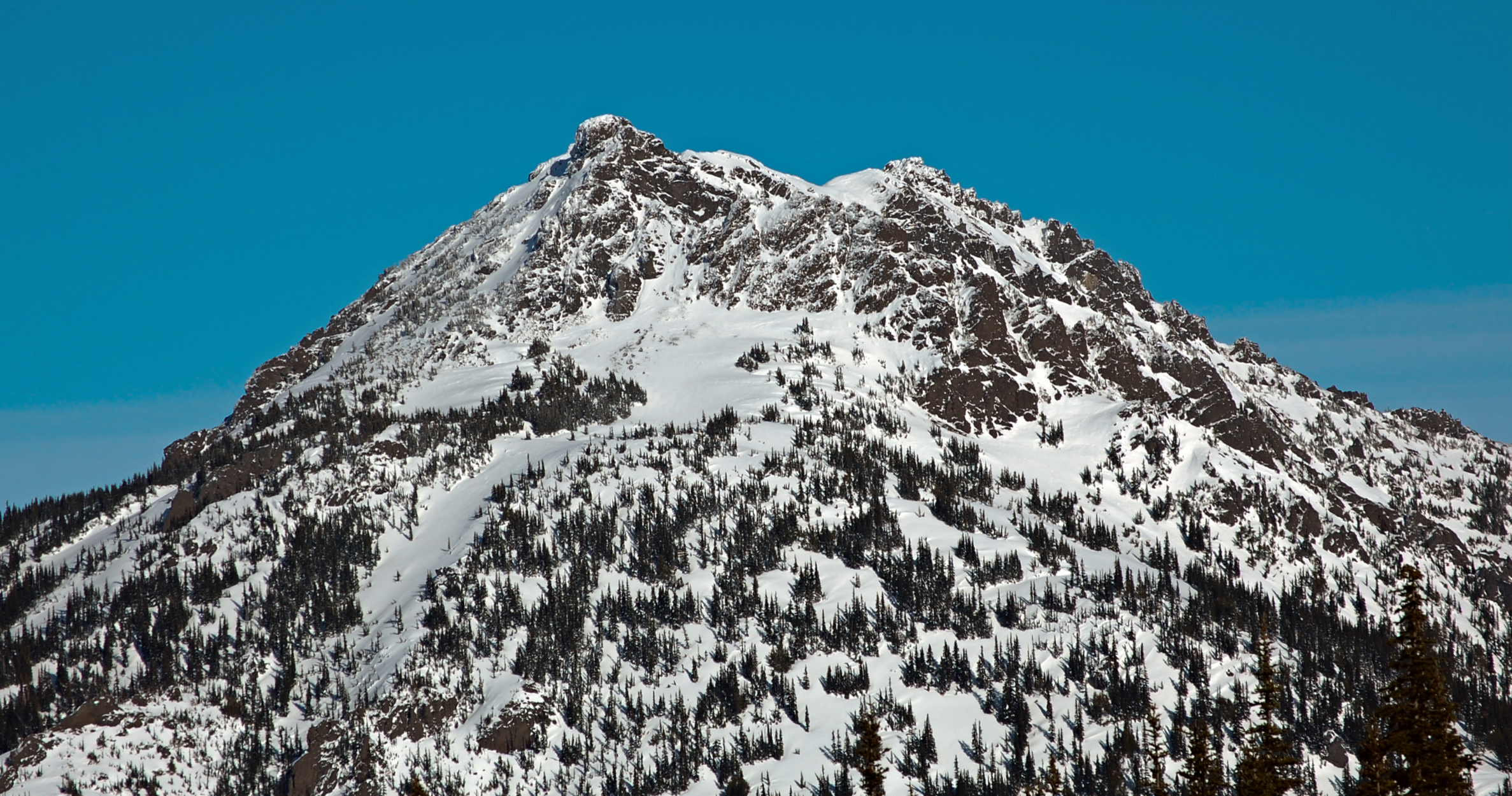
Mt. Angeles in winter

Most weather fronts originate in the Pacific Ocean, and travel northeast toward the Olympic Mountains. As fronts approach, they are forced upward by the peaks of the Olympic Range, causing them to drop their moisture in the form of rain or snowfall (Orographic lift). As a result, the Olympics experience high precipitation, especially during the winter months in the form of snowfall. During winter months, weather is usually cloudy, but, due to high pressure systems over the Pacific Ocean that intensify during summer months, there is often little or no cloud cover during the summer.

Climate data for Mount Angeles 47.9938°N 123.4642°W
Month	Jan	Feb	Mar	Apr	May	Jun	Jul	Aug	Sep	Oct	Nov	Dec	Year
Mean daily maximum °F (°C)	31.4 (−0.3)	32.4 (0.2)	34.2 (1.2)	40.0 (4.4)	47.3 (8.5)	52.5 (11.4)	61.5 (16.4)	62.3 (16.8)	56.6 (13.7)	45.9 (7.7)	34.7 (1.5)	30.3 (−0.9)	44.1 (6.7)
Daily mean °F (°C)	26.7 (−2.9)	26.6 (−3.0)	27.4 (−2.6)	31.8 (−0.1)	38.8 (3.8)	43.8 (6.6)	51.9 (11.1)	52.8 (11.6)	47.9 (8.8)	38.8 (3.8)	29.8 (−1.2)	25.8 (−3.4)	36.8 (2.7)
Mean daily minimum °F (°C)	22.1 (−5.5)	20.8 (−6.2)	20.6 (−6.3)	23.5 (−4.7)	30.3 (−0.9)	35.2 (1.8)	42.3 (5.7)	43.3 (6.3)	39.2 (4.0)	31.6 (−0.2)	24.8 (−4.0)	21.3 (−5.9)	29.6 (−1.3)
Average precipitation inches (mm)	13.59 (345)	8.86 (225)	10.59 (269)	5.62 (143)	3.16 (80)	2.06 (52)	1.11 (28)	1.55 (39)	2.20 (56)	7.42 (188)	15.50 (394)	15.61 (396)	87.27 (2,215)
Average dew point °F (°C)	23.3 (−4.8)	22.8 (−5.1)	24.1 (−4.4)	26.5 (−3.1)	31.6 (−0.2)	36.2 (2.3)	40.3 (4.6)	41.2 (5.1)	36.5 (2.5)	31.6 (−0.2)	25.9 (−3.4)	22.8 (−5.1)	30.2 (−1.0)
Source: PRISM Climate Group

== Geology ==
The Olympic Mountains are composed of obducted clastic wedge material and oceanic crust, primarily Eocene sandstone, turbidite, and basaltic oceanic crust. The mountains were sculpted during the Pleistocene era by erosion and glaciers advancing and retreating multiple times.

== See also ==
- Olympic Mountains
- Geology of the Pacific Northwest
- Geography of Washington (state)

== Gallery ==
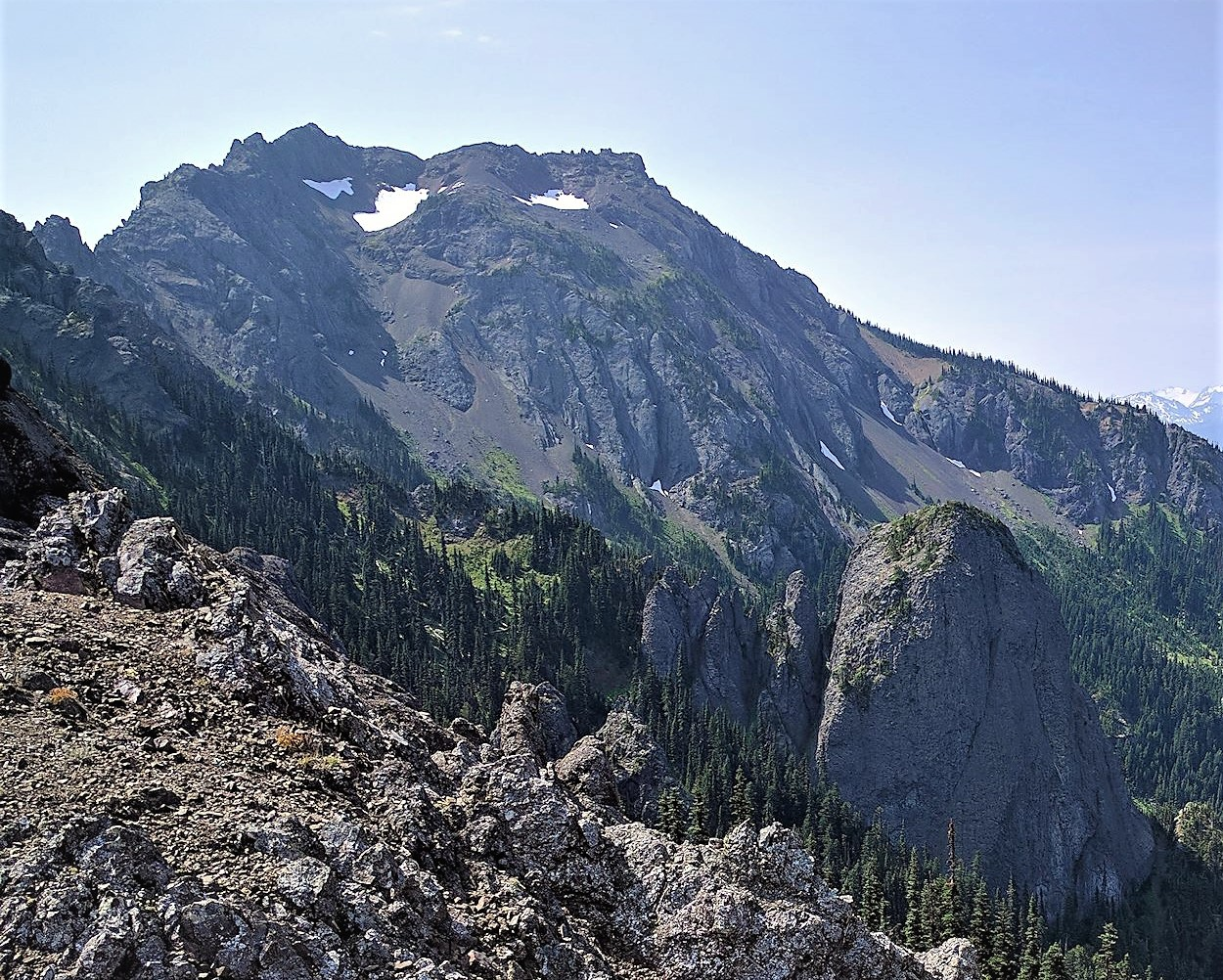
North aspect

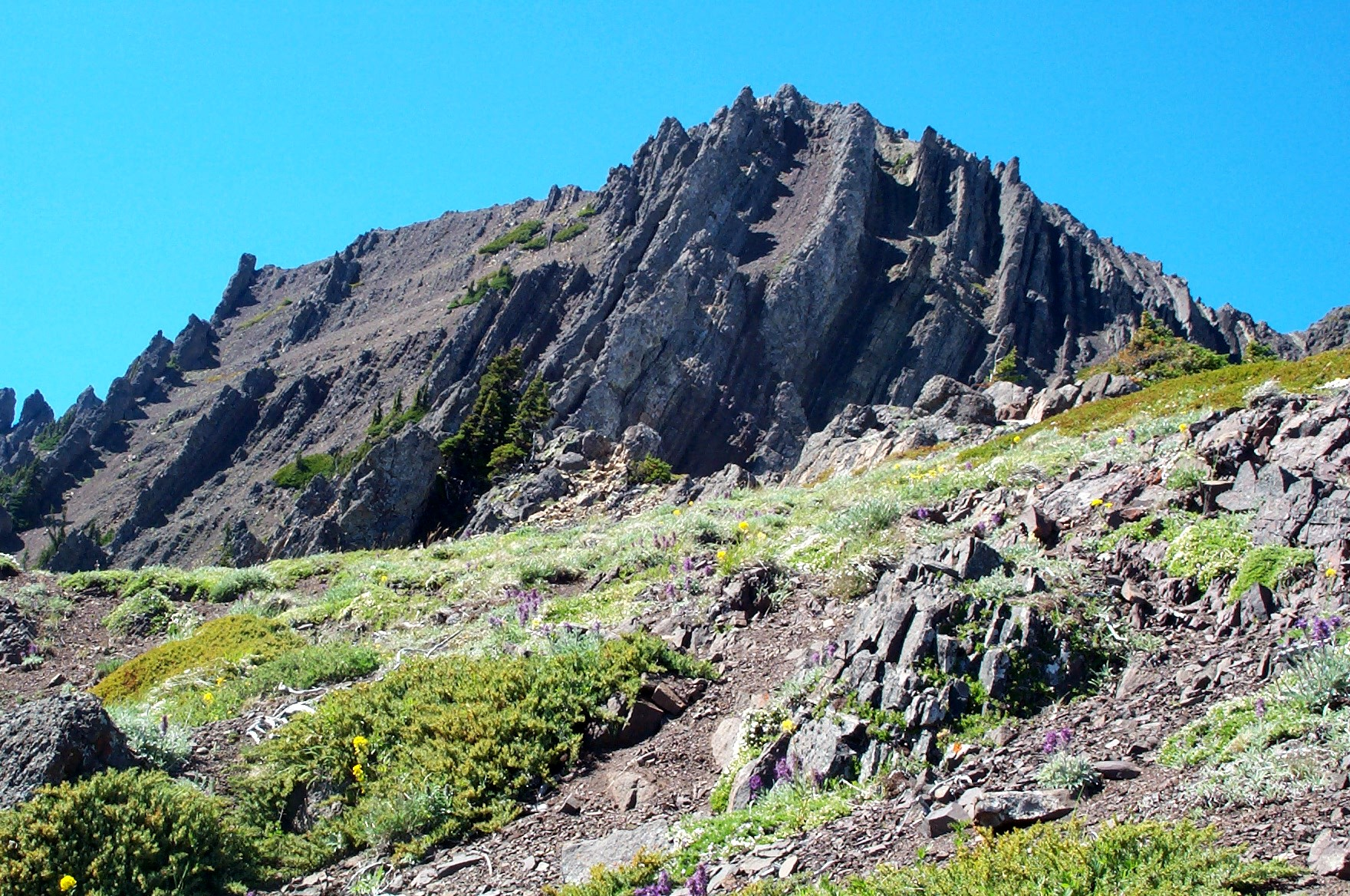
Mount Angeles summit. Notice the steeply tilted layers of ocean floor sediments

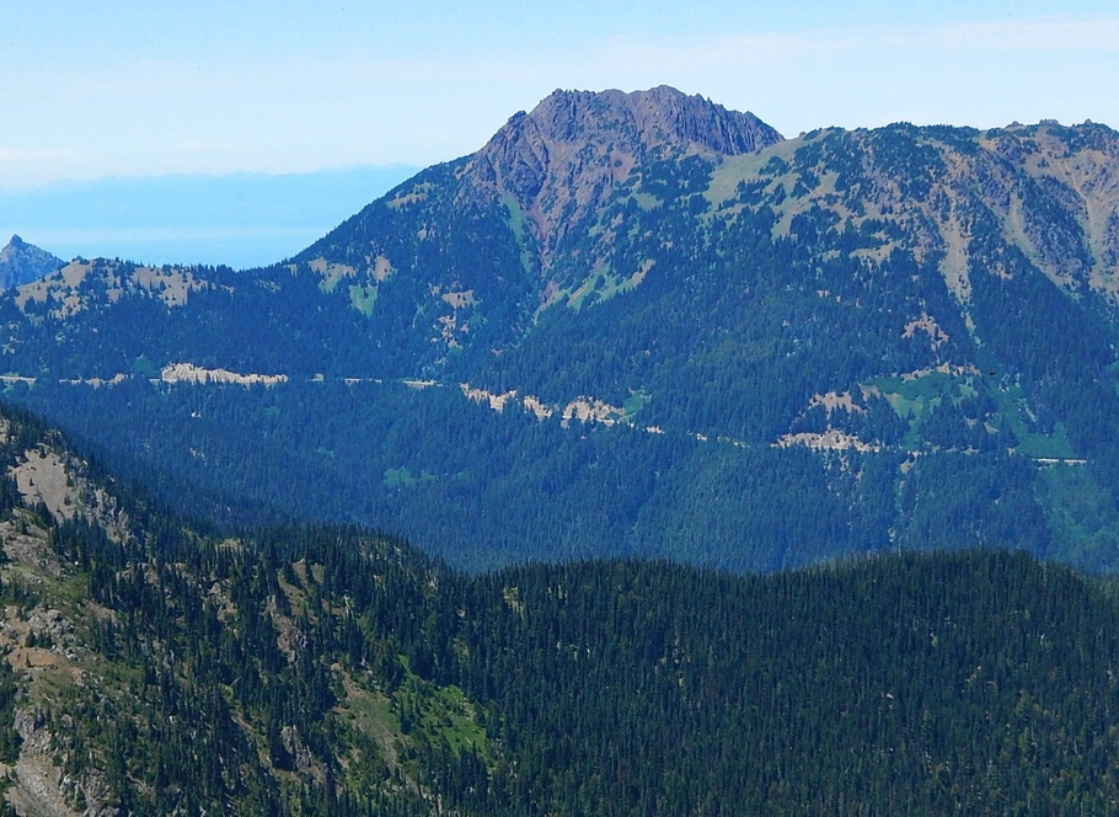
Mount Angeles seen from Eagle Point

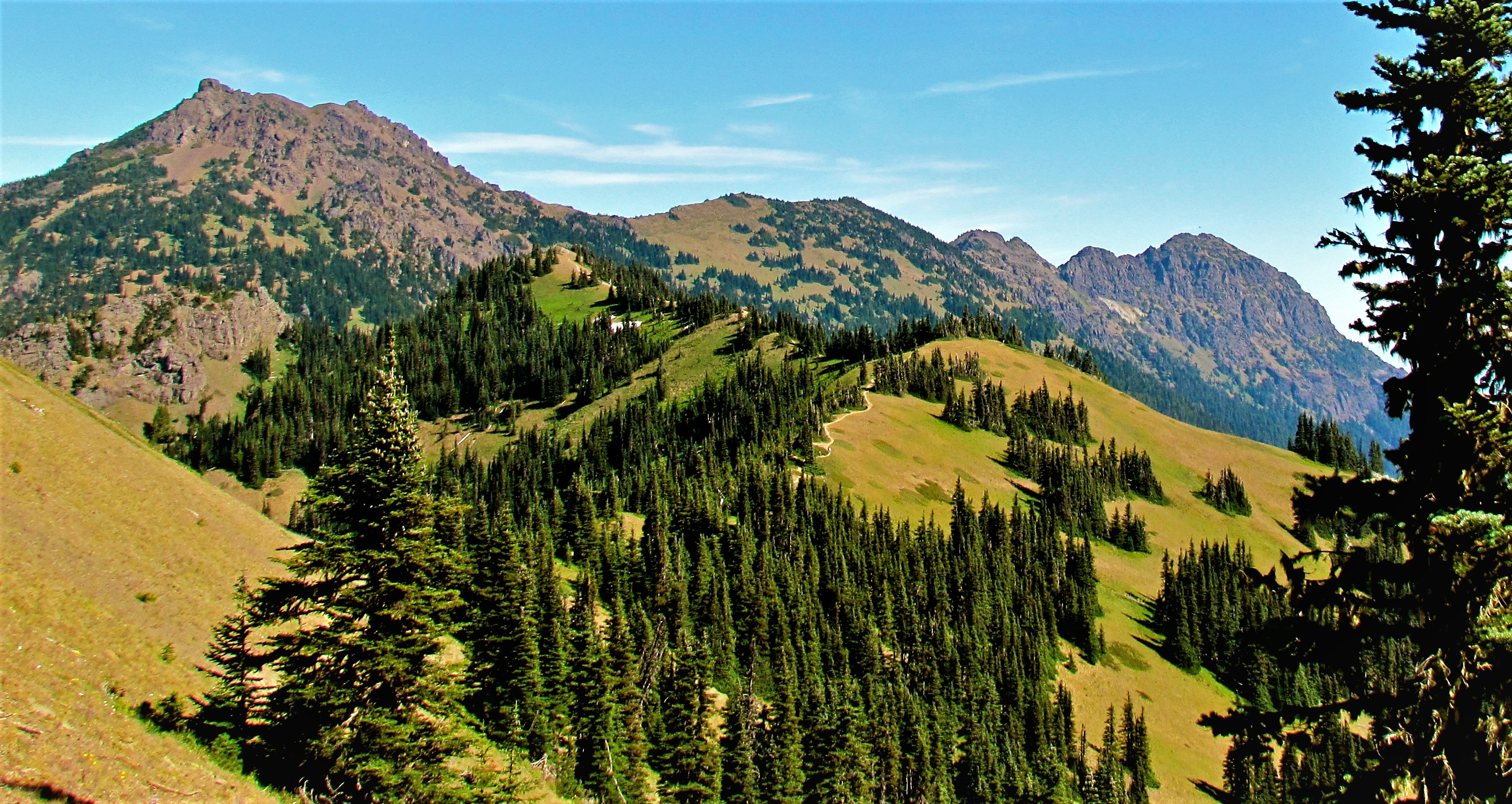
Mt. Angeles (left), Rocky Peak (right)
