= Washington's National Park Fund =

Washington's National Park Fund is a 501(c)(3) non-profit organization that serves as the official fund raising partner for Mount Rainier National Park, North Cascades National Park, and Olympic National Park in Washington state, United States. The Fund is governed by a voluntary board of directors. The Fund both solicits and accepts charitable contributions on behalf of the parks and distributes them under guidelines agreed to by both the park superintendents and the board of directors for the Fund. This relationship is governed by partnership agreements.

== History ==
Originally incorporated in 1993, the Fund relinquished its independent, nonprofit status in 2003 to become an affiliate of the National Park Foundation. Washington's National Park Fund regained its own nonprofit status in 2006 and has operated independently from the National Park Foundation since March 1, 2007.

=== 2008 ===
In 2008, the Fund donated $250,000 for Washington's parks.

- At Mount Rainier National Park:

- $100,000 to Solar Panel Array at Ohanapecosh Ranger Station and Storm and Flood Damage Recovery Work.

- At North Cascades National Park:

- $60,500 to Create the Junior Ranger Program, Design and Build Diablo Lake Overlook Interpretive Center, Create "Cascades for Kids" Corner in the Newhalem Visitor Center, Botany Forays and the Teacher to Ranger to Teacher Program.

- At Olympic National Park:

- $95,000 to Comprehensive Education Program on Elwha River and Elwha Dam Removal Project and Fisher Reintroduction Monitoring and Education.

=== 2009 ===
In 2009, the Fund donated more than $200,000 to the parks:

- At Mount Rainier National Park:

- $72,614.55 to CAMP - Camping Adventure with My Parents, Connecting Kids to Parks, Paradise Meadow Restoration and Volunteer Outreach.

- At North Cascades National Park:

- $55,000 to Volunteer Shelter at Marblemount, Botanical Forays and Landbird Inventory & Monitoring.

- At Olympic National Park:

- $72,621.94 to Study & Protect Roosevelt Elk, Monitor Fisher Restoration and Assess & Conserve Olympic Marmot Populations.

== Today ==
Washington’s National Park Fund awarded $2.28 million in combined support to Mount Rainier, North Cascades, and Olympic National Parks in 2025. Funded projects, selected by park leadership, included initiatives supporting scientific research, visitor experience improvements, and volunteer programs.
