= Klahhane Ridge =

Coordinates: 47°59′40″N 123°26′25″W

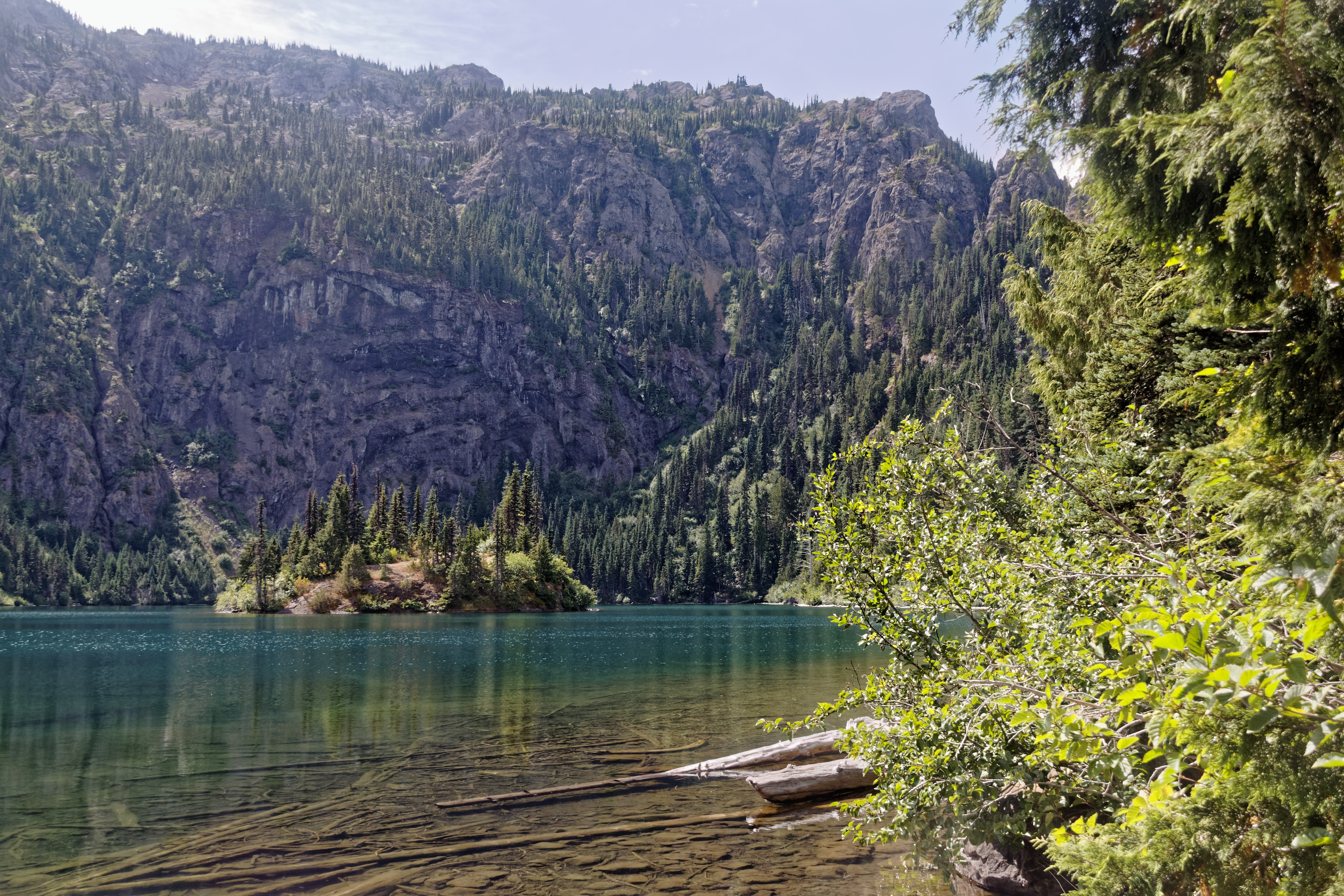

Klahhane Ridge is located just to the south of Port Angeles, Washington, USA near Hurricane Ridge in the Olympic National Park. The ridge is accessible by a variety of hiking trails and offers views of the Olympic Mountains and the Strait of Juan de Fuca.

On October 17, 2010, a mountain goat attacked and killed Robert H. Boardman at Klahhane Ridge. Boardman had been hiking with his wife and friends, when an aggressive mountain goat approached. Boardman told the rest of his party to move down the trail while he tried to scare the goat away. His companions heard a loud yell and when they investigated the found Boardman on the ground with the aggressive goat nearby. Boardman had been gored in the thigh. A coast guard helicopter transported Boardman to Olympic Medical Center where he was pronounced deceased. The goat in question had been reported as being aggressive and the National Park Service had been keeping tabs on it. The goat was later shot by park employees and submitted for necropsy. Mountain goats are a non-native species that were introduced to the Olympic Mountains in the 1920s.
