= Olympic National Park =

National park in Washington, United States

- IUCN category II (national park)
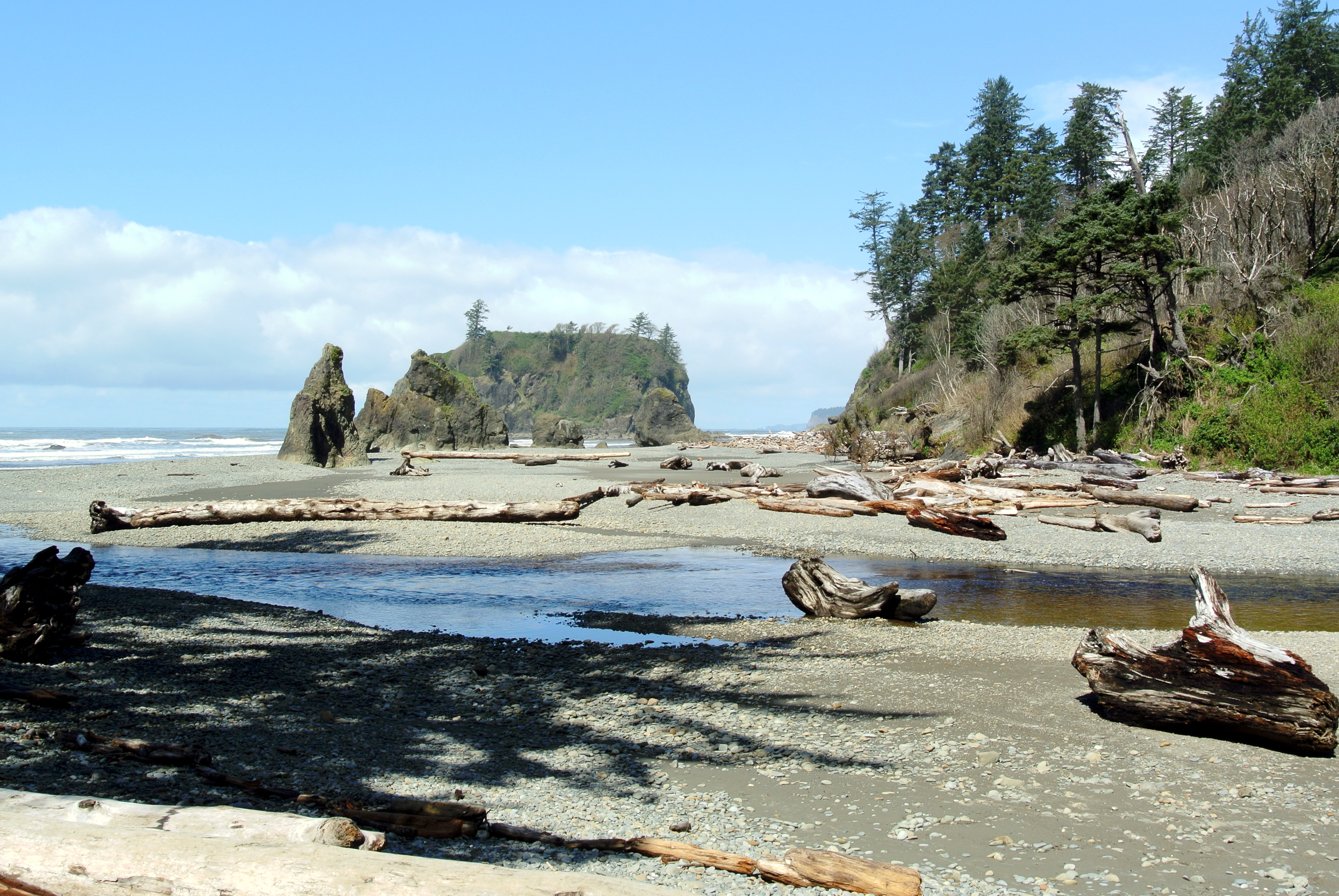
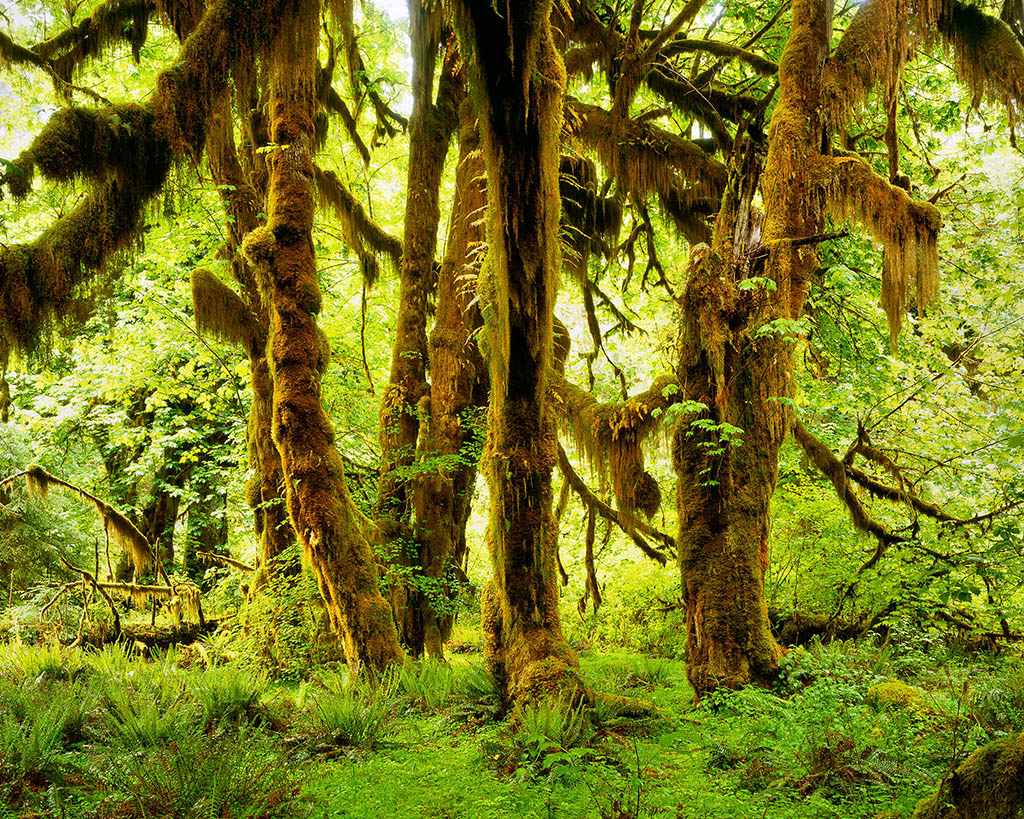
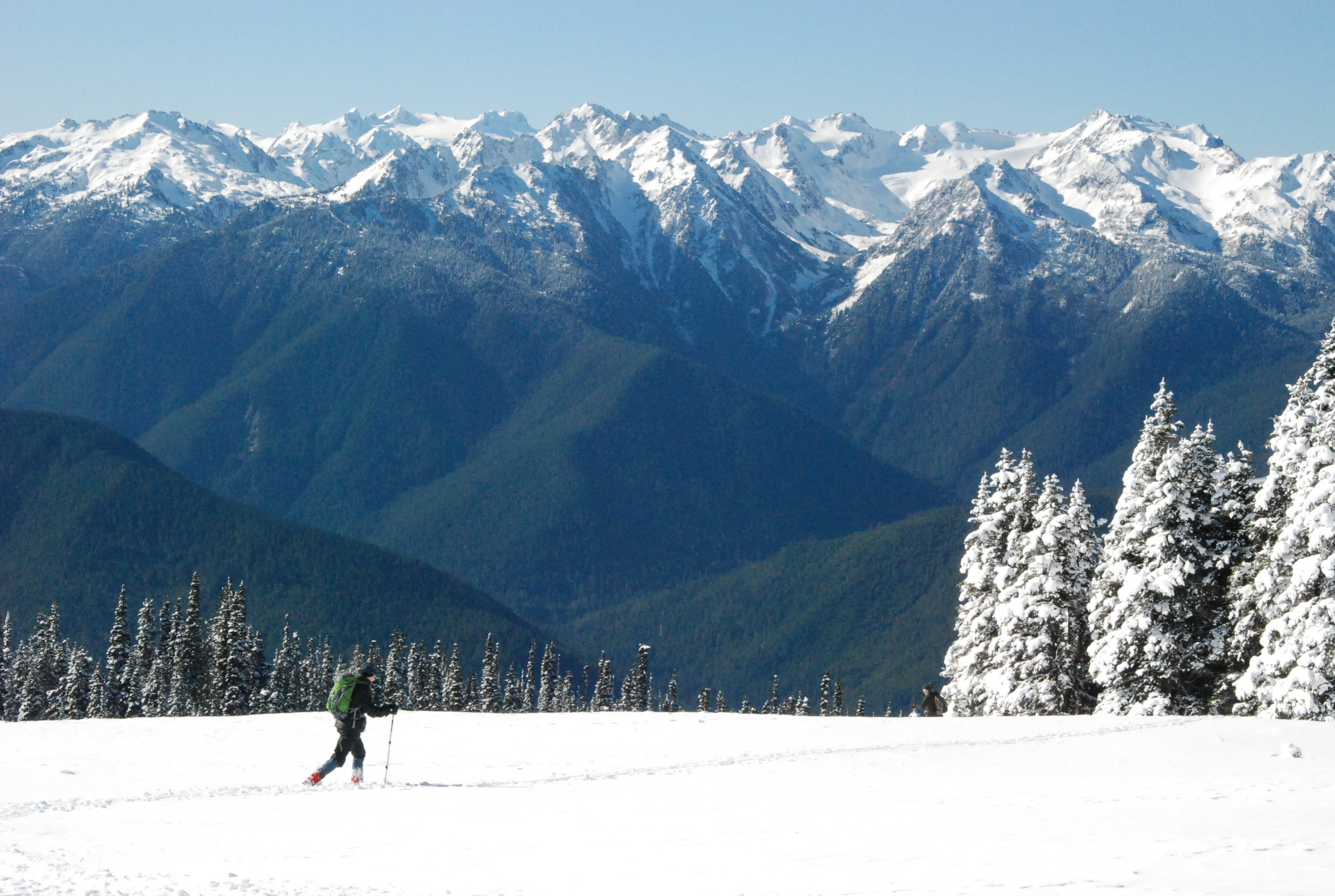
- Cedar Creek and Abbey Island from Ruby Beach Hoh Rainforest Hurricane Ridge in winter
- Interactive map of Olympic National Park
- Location: Jefferson, Clallam, Mason, and Grays Harbor counties, Washington, United States
- Nearest city: Port Angeles
- Coordinates: 47°58′9″N 123°29′55″W
- Area: 922,650 acres (3,733.8 km^{2})
- Established: June 29, 1938; 88 years ago
- Visitors: 3,717,267 (in 2024)
- Governing body: National Park Service
- Website: Olympic National Park

UNESCO World Heritage Site
- Criteria: Natural: vii, ix
- Reference: 151
- Inscription: 1981 (5th Session)

Olympic National Park is a national park of the United States located in Washington, on the Olympic Peninsula. The park has four regions: the Pacific coastline, the west-side temperate rainforest, alpine areas, and the forests of the drier east side. Within the park there are three distinct ecosystems, including subalpine forest and wildflower meadow, temperate forest, and the rugged Pacific coast.

President Theodore Roosevelt originally designated the park as Mount Olympus National Monument on March 2, 1909. The monument was redesignated a national park by Congress and President Franklin D. Roosevelt on June 29, 1938. In 1976, Olympic National Park was designated by UNESCO as an International Biosphere Reserve, and in 1981 as a World Heritage Site. In 1988, Congress designated 95 percent of the park (1,370 square miles (3,500 km^{2})) as the Olympic Wilderness, which was renamed Daniel J. Evans Wilderness in honor of the former Washington state Governor and U.S. Senator Daniel J. Evans in 2017. During his tenure in the Senate, Evans co-sponsored the 1988 bill that created the state's wilderness areas. It is the largest wilderness area in Washington.

Olympic National Park had over 3.7 million visitors in 2024, ranking 25th among all parks in the United States.

== Park purpose ==
As stated in the foundation document:

The purpose of Olympic National Park is to preserve for the benefit, use, and enjoyment of the people, a large wilderness park containing the finest sample of primeval forest of Sitka spruce, western hemlock, Douglas fir, and western red cedar in the entire United States; to provide suitable winter range and permanent protection for the herds of native Roosevelt elk and other wildlife indigenous to the area; to conserve and render available to the people, for recreational use, this outstanding mountainous country, containing numerous glaciers and perpetual snow fields, and a portion of the surrounding verdant forests together with a narrow strip along the beautiful Washington coast.

== Natural and geologic history ==
=== Coastline ===
The coastal portion of the park is a rugged, sandy beach along with a strip of adjacent forest. It is 60 miles (97 km) long but just a few miles wide, with native communities at the mouths of two rivers. The Hoh River has the Hoh people and at the town of La Push at the mouth of the Quileute River live the Quileute.

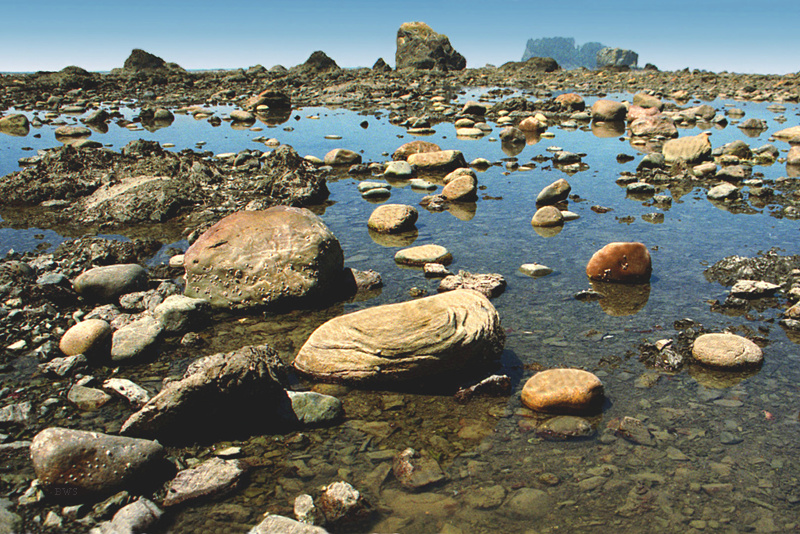
Tide pools form at low tide

The beach has unbroken stretches of wilderness ranging from 10 to 20 miles (16 to 32 km). While some beaches are primarily sand, others are covered with heavy rock and very large boulders. Bushy overgrowth, slippery footing, tides, and misty rainforest weather all hinder foot travel. The coastal strip is more readily accessible than the interior of the Olympics; due to the difficult terrain, very few backpackers venture beyond casual day-hiking distances.

The most popular piece of the coastal strip is the 9-mile (14 km) Ozette Loop. The Park Service runs a registration and reservation program to control the usage levels of this area. From the trailhead at Ozette Lake, a 3-mile (4.8 km) leg of the trail is a boardwalk-enhanced path through near primal coastal cedar swamp. Arriving at the ocean, it is a 3-mile walk supplemented by headland trails for high tides. This area has traditionally been favored by the Makah from Neah Bay. The third 3-mile leg is enabled by a boardwalk which has enhanced the loop's accessibility. Another popular trail is the 0.7-mile (1.1 km) path that leads to Second Beach, which includes views of offshore seastacks and wildlife.

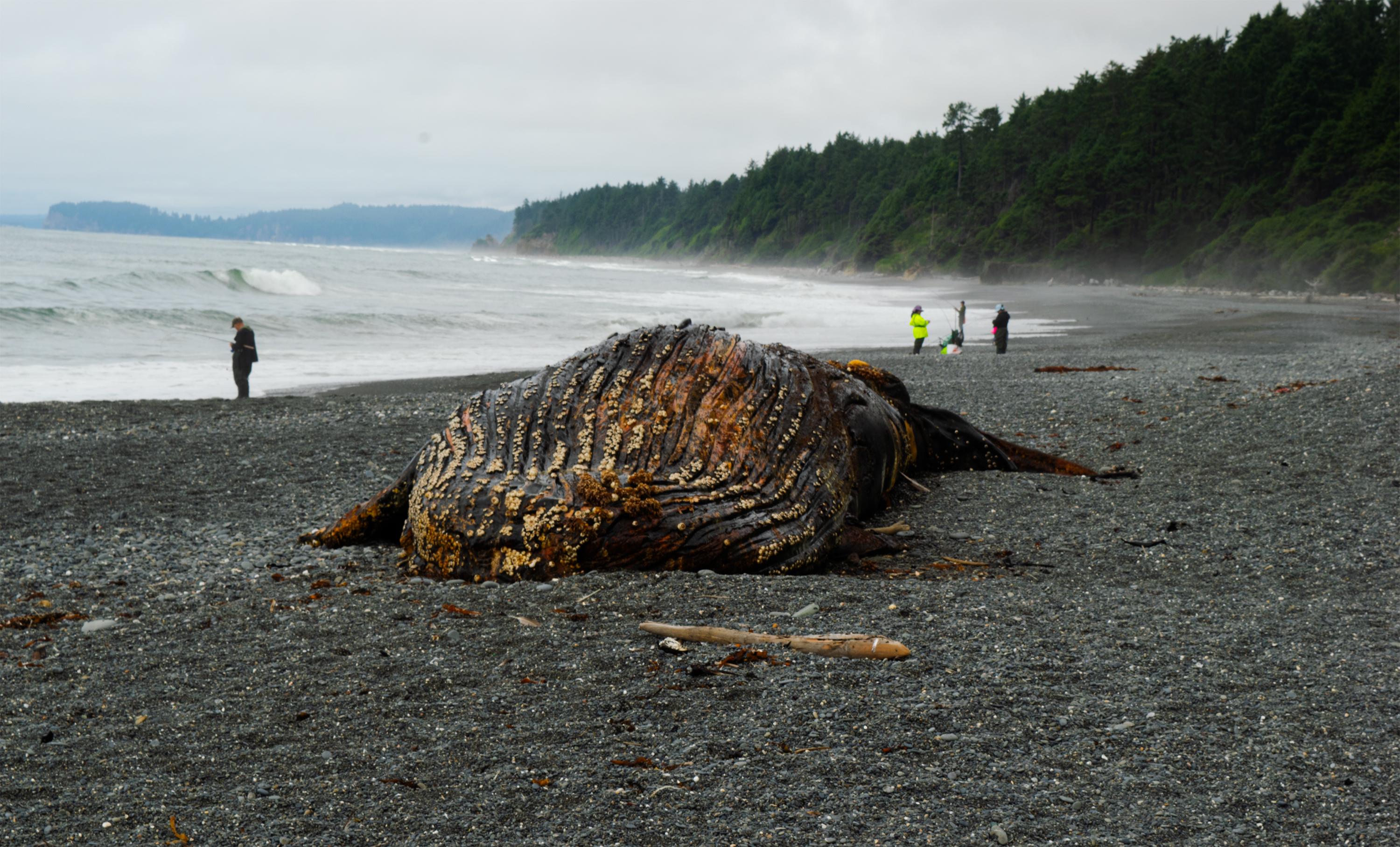
Beached whale at Ruby Beach

There are thick groves of trees adjacent to the sand, which results in chunks of timber from fallen trees on the beach. The mostly unaltered Hoh River, toward the south end of the park, discharges large amounts of naturally eroded timber and other drift, which moves north, enriching the beaches. Even today driftwood deposits form a commanding presence, biologically as well as visually, giving a taste of the original condition of the beach viewable to some extent in early photos. Drift material often comes from a considerable distance; the Columbia River formerly contributed huge amounts to the Northwest Pacific coasts.

The smaller coastal portion of the park is separated from the larger, inland portion. President Franklin D. Roosevelt originally had supported connecting them with a continuous strip of parkland.

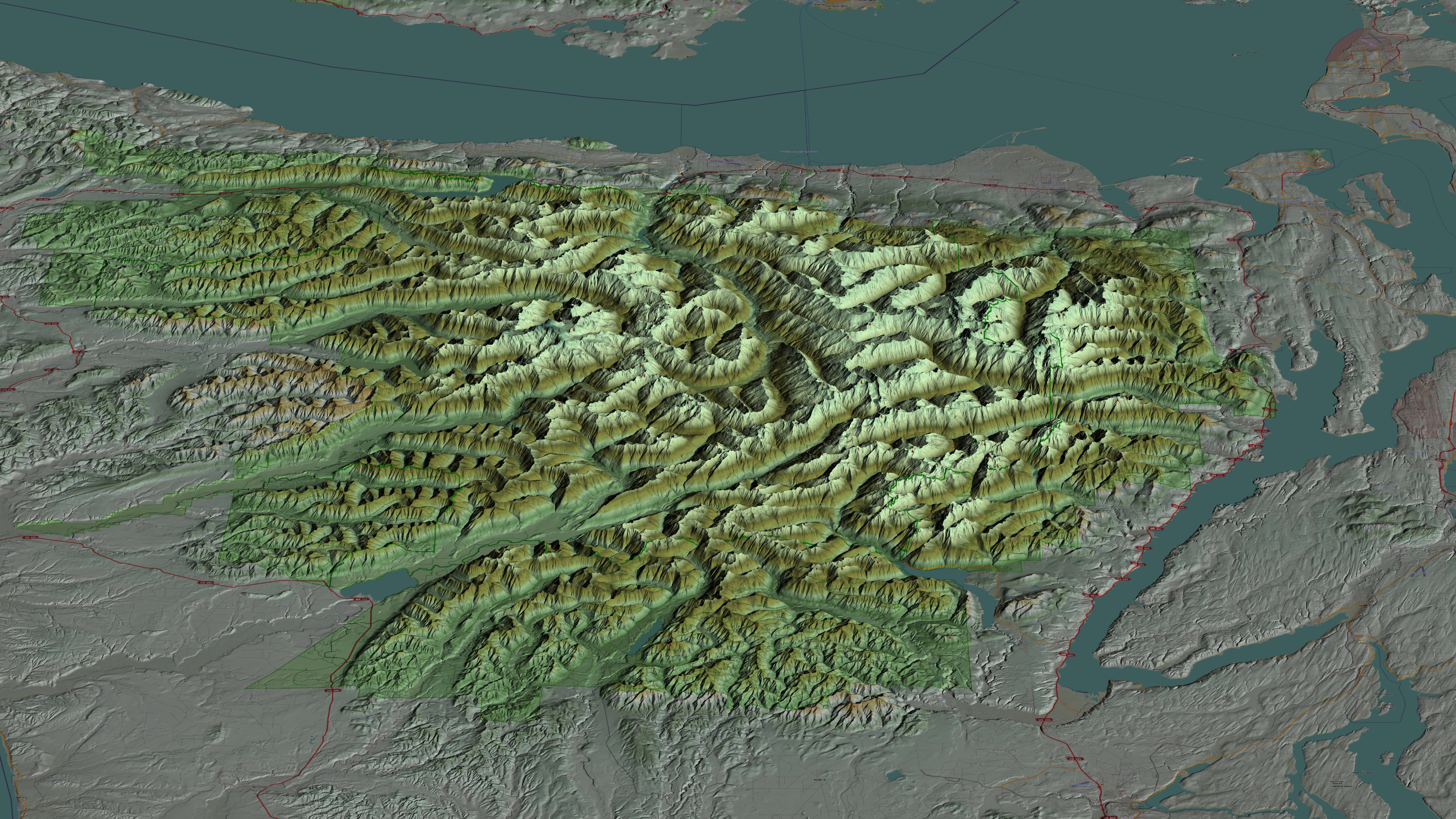
A 3D computer-generated aerial view

The park is known for its unique turbidites. It has very exposed turbidities with white calcite veins. Turbidites are rocks or sediments that travel into the ocean as suspended particles in the flow of water, causing a sedimentary layering effect on the ocean floor. Over time the sediments and rock compact and the process repeats as a constant cycle. The park also is known for its tectonic mélanges that have been deemed 'smell rocks' by the locals due to their strong petroleum odor. Mélanges are large individual rocks that are large enough that they are accounted for in map drawings. The Olympic mélanges can be as large as a house.

=== Glaciated mountains ===
Within the center of Olympic National Park rise the Olympic Mountains, whose sides and ridgelines are topped with glaciers and perennial snowfields; the park's glacial landscape reflects glaciation during the geologically recent Pleistocene Epoch, within the Quaternary. The mountains themselves are products of accretionary wedge uplifting related to the Juan de Fuca Plate subduction zone. The geology includes basaltic rocks, marine sedimentary rocks, and tectonic mélange units, including Eocene basaltic rocks of the Crescent Formation, overlying clastic marine sedimentary rocks, and locally mapped mélange such as the Ozette mélange. The number of glaciers within the national park declined from 266 in 1982 to 184 by 2009 due to the effects of climate change.

The western half of the range is dominated by the peak of Mount Olympus, which rises to 7,965 feet (2,428 m). Mount Olympus receives a large amount of snow and consequently supports the most extensive glaciation in the Olympic Mountains. It has several glaciers, including Hoh Glacier at 3.06 miles (4.93 km) in length. In the east, the range becomes much drier due to the rain shadow of the western mountains; the eastern mountains include numerous high peaks and craggy ridges. The tallest summit in the eastern Olympics is Mount Deception, at 7,788 feet (2,374 m).

=== Temperate rainforest ===
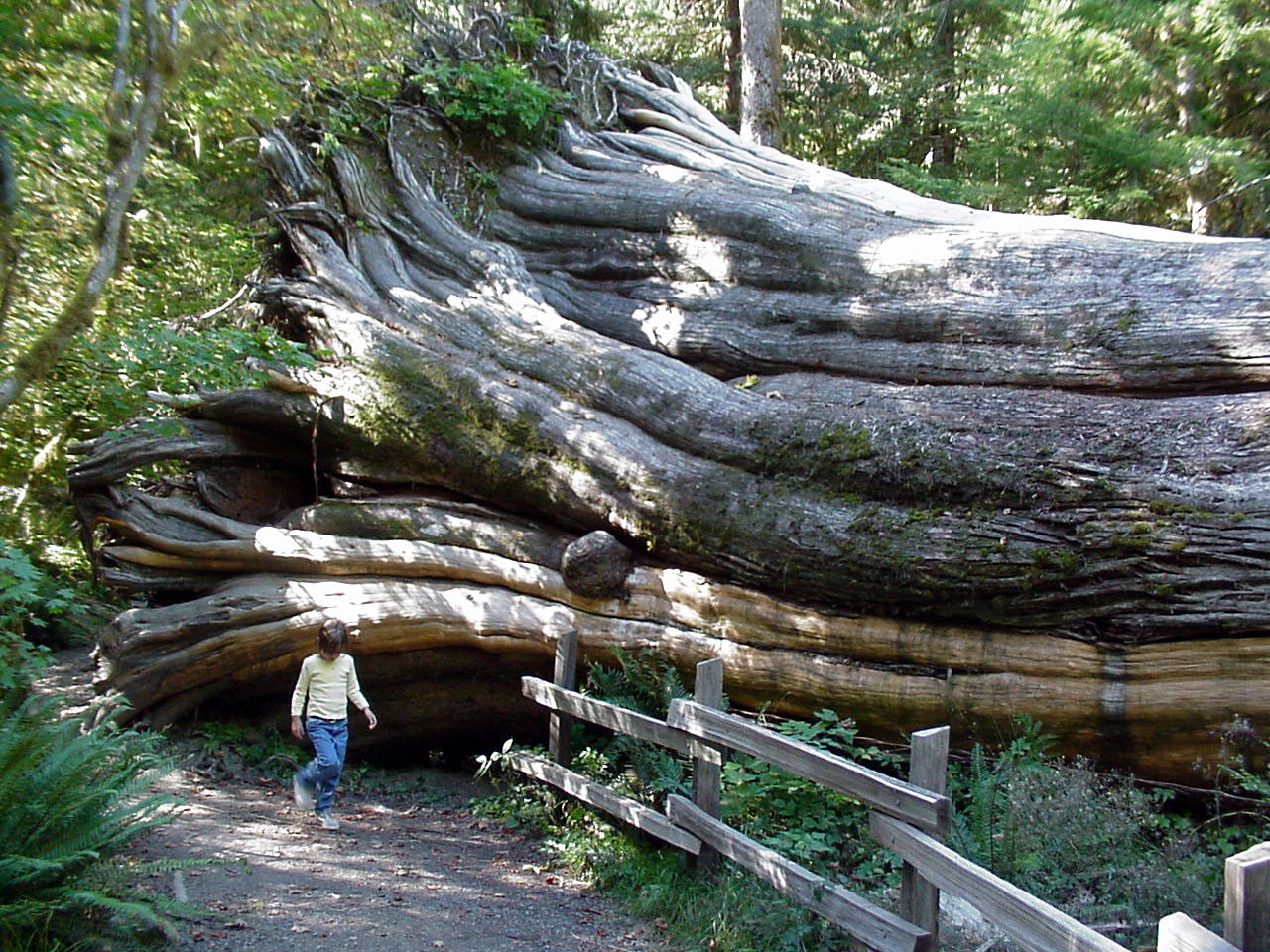
Downed western redcedar

The western side of the park is mantled by temperate rainforests, including the Hoh Rainforest and Quinault Rainforest, which receive annual precipitation of over 12 feet (370 cm), making this perhaps the wettest area in the continental United States.

As opposed to tropical rainforests and most other temperate rainforest regions, the rainforests of the Pacific Northwest are dominated by coniferous trees, including Sitka Spruce, Western Hemlock, Coast Douglas-fir and Western redcedar. Mosses coat the bark of these trees and even drip down from their branches in green, moist tendrils. A Western redcedar on the western edge of the park, known as the Kalaloch Big Cedar Tree, is believed to be the oldest tree in the state of Washington at over 1,000 years old. Half the tree fell in a 2014 winter storm, though the remaining half continues to stand and is accessible to park visitors.

Valleys on the eastern side of the park also have notable old-growth forest, but the climate is notably drier. Sitka Spruce is absent, trees on average are somewhat smaller, and undergrowth is generally less dense and different in character. Immediately northeast of the park is a rainshadow area where annual precipitation averages about 17 inches.

== Ecology ==
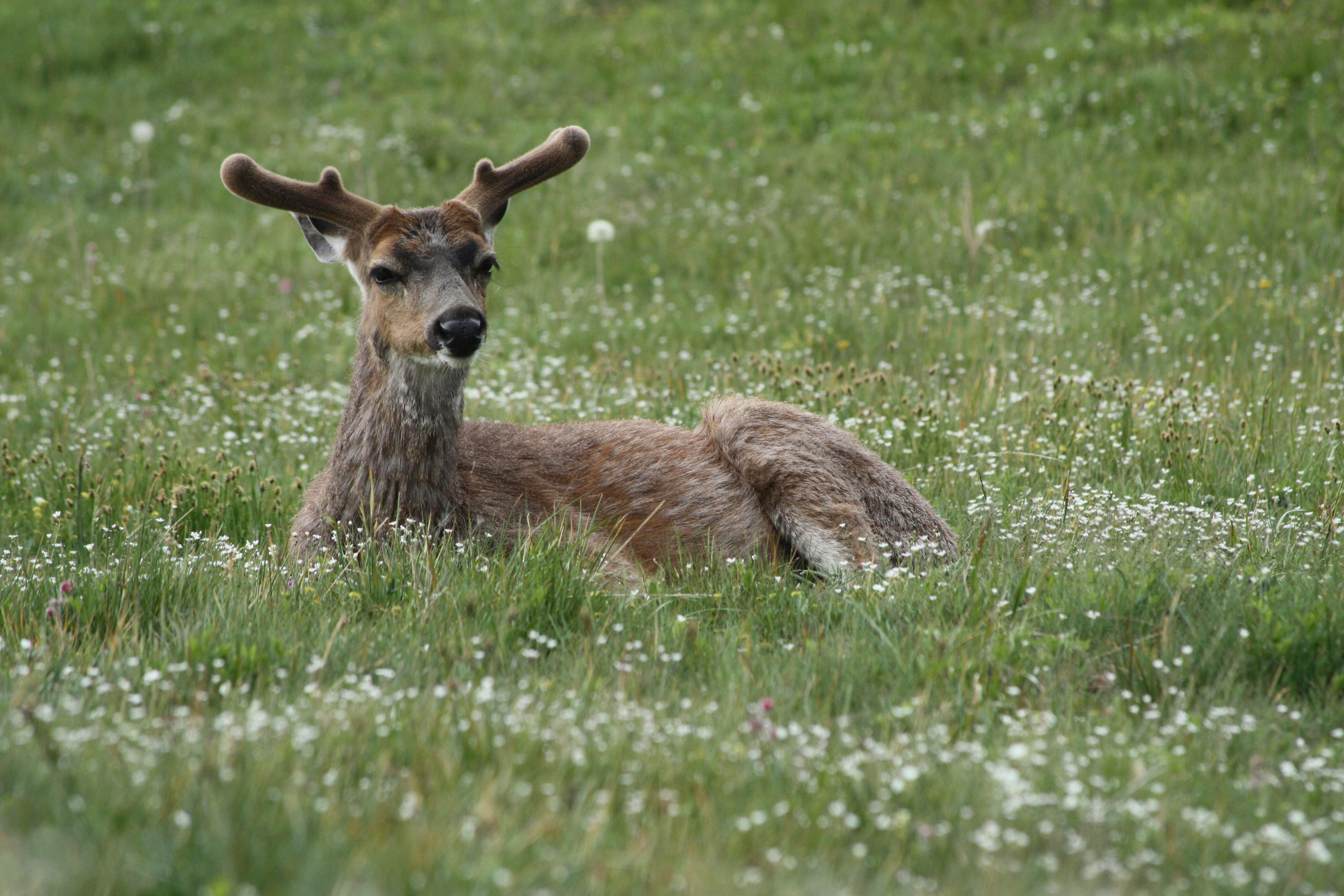
Black-tailed deer

According to the A. W. Kuchler U.S. Potential natural vegetation Types, the park encompasses five classifications: Alpine Meadows & Barren, aka Alpine tundra (52) potential vegetation type with an Alpine Meadow (11) potential vegetation form; a Fir/Hemlock (4) vegetation type with a Pacific Northwest conifer forest (1) vegetation form; a cedar/hemlock/Douglas fir vegetation type with a Pacific Northwest conifer forest (1) vegetation form; Western spruce/fir vegetation type (15) with a Rocky Mountain conifer forest (3) vegetation form; and a spruce/cedar/hemlock (1) vegetation type with a Pacific Northwest conifer forest (1) vegetation form.

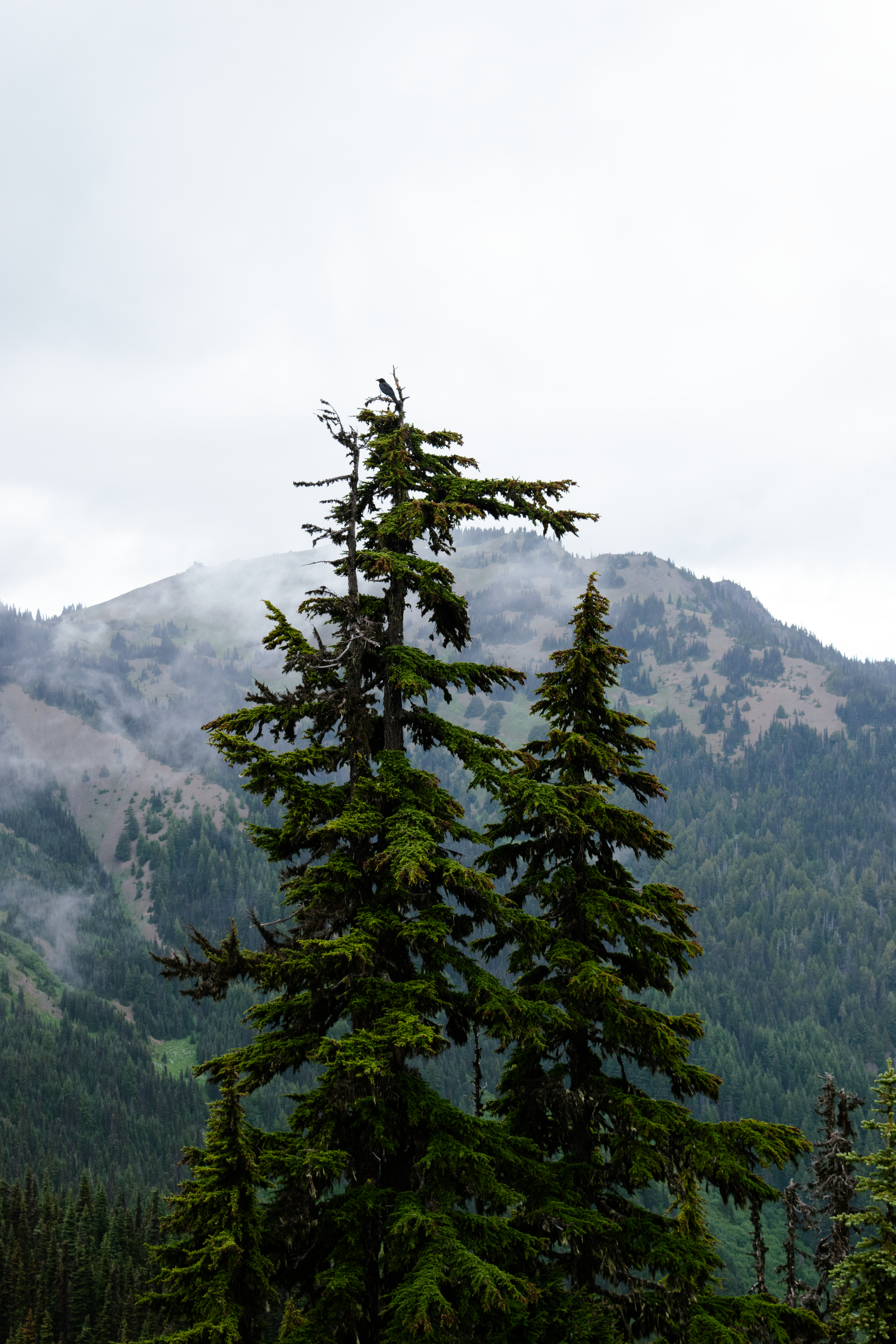
Raven perched on a tree at Hurricane Ridge

Because the park sits on an isolated peninsula, with a high mountain range dividing it from the land to the south, it developed many endemic plant and animal species (like the Olympic Marmot, Piper's bellflower and Flett's violet). The southwestern coastline of the Olympic Peninsula is also the northernmost non-glaciated region on the Pacific coast of North America, with the result that – aided by the distance from peaks to the coast at the Last Glacial Maximum being about twice what it is today – it served as a refuge from which plants colonized glaciated regions to the north.

The park also provides habitat for many species (like the Roosevelt elk) that are native only to the Pacific Northwest coast. As a result, scientists have declared it a biological reserve and studied its unique species to better understand how plants and animals evolve. The park is home to sizable populations of black bears and black-tailed deer. The park also has a noteworthy cougar population, numbering about 150. Mountain goats were accidentally introduced into the park in the 1920s and have caused much damage on the native flora. The NPS has activated management plans to control the goats.

The park contains an estimated 366,000 acres (572 mi^{2}; 1,480 km^{2}) of old-growth forests.

Forest fires are infrequent in the rainforests of the park's western side; however, a severe drought after the driest spring in 100 years, coupled with an extremely low snowpack from the preceding winter, resulted in a rare rainforest fire in the summer of 2015.

Ecological zones - glaciated mountains, subalpine forests and meadows, temperate rainforests, and coastline
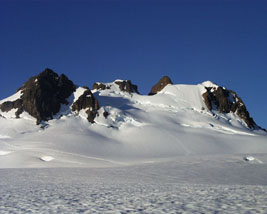
The summit of Mount Olympus from the Blue Glacier

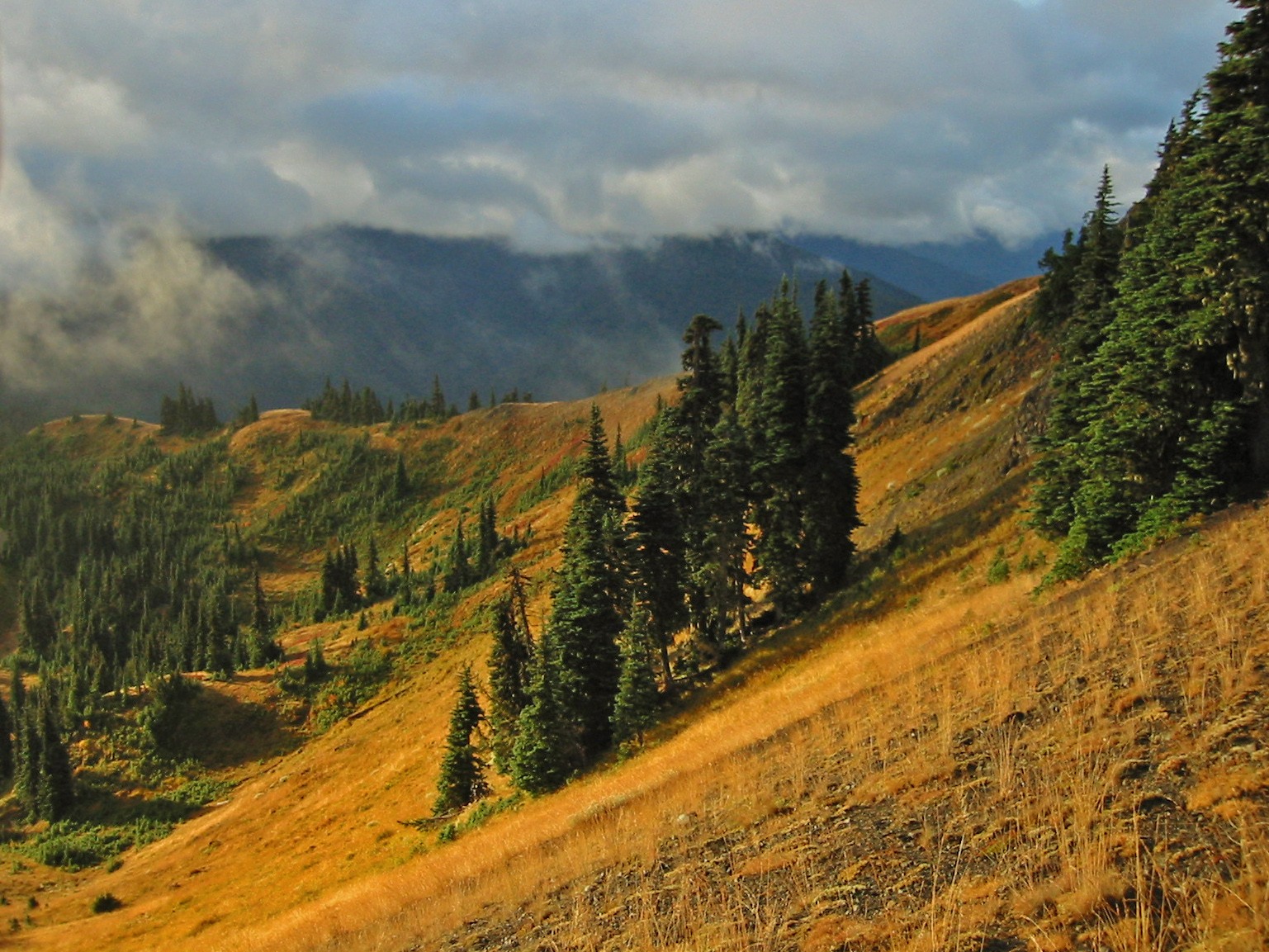
Subalpine fir in a meadow on Hurricane Ridge

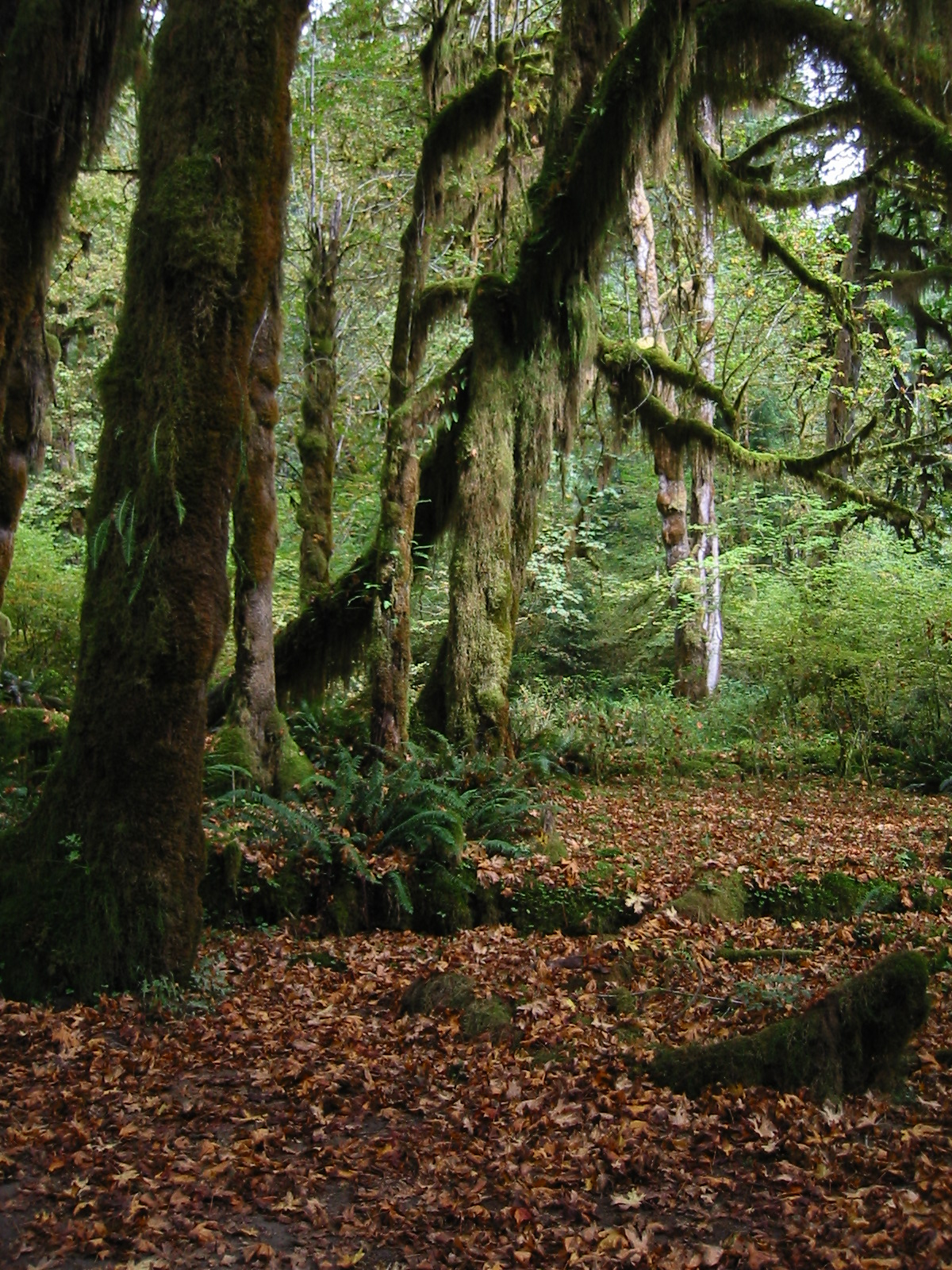
Bigleaf maples, Hoh Rainforest

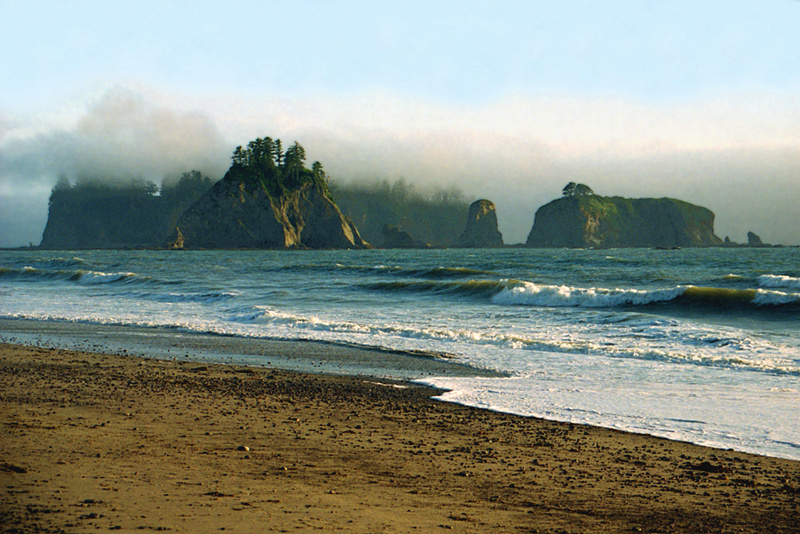
Foggy sea stacks

== Climate ==
According to the Köppen climate classification system, Olympic National Park encompasses two classifications: a temperate oceanic climate (Cfb) in the western half, and a warm-summer Mediterranean climate (Csb) in the eastern half. According to the United States Department of Agriculture, the plant hardiness zone at Hoh Rainforest Visitor Center is 8a with an average annual extreme minimum temperature of 14.5 °F (−9.7 °C).

Climate data for Elwha Ranger Station, Washington, 1991–2020 normals, extremes 1942–2017
Month	Jan	Feb	Mar	Apr	May	Jun	Jul	Aug	Sep	Oct	Nov	Dec	Year
Record high °F (°C)	64 (18)	67 (19)	70 (21)	80 (27)	87 (31)	93 (34)	96 (36)	97 (36)	91 (33)	76 (24)	70 (21)	65 (18)	97 (36)
Mean maximum °F (°C)	51.1 (10.6)	51.9 (11.1)	60.1 (15.6)	70.6 (21.4)	77.8 (25.4)	82.6 (28.1)	87.6 (30.9)	87.0 (30.6)	79.5 (26.4)	67.1 (19.5)	55.4 (13.0)	49.8 (9.9)	90.7 (32.6)
Mean daily maximum °F (°C)	41.1 (5.1)	43.8 (6.6)	49.7 (9.8)	56.3 (13.5)	63.4 (17.4)	67.2 (19.6)	73.6 (23.1)	74.5 (23.6)	68.1 (20.1)	55.5 (13.1)	45.6 (7.6)	40.7 (4.8)	56.6 (13.7)
Daily mean °F (°C)	37.0 (2.8)	38.3 (3.5)	42.3 (5.7)	47.1 (8.4)	53.3 (11.8)	57.2 (14.0)	62.2 (16.8)	63.0 (17.2)	58.1 (14.5)	48.5 (9.2)	40.8 (4.9)	36.7 (2.6)	48.7 (9.3)
Mean daily minimum °F (°C)	32.8 (0.4)	32.8 (0.4)	34.9 (1.6)	37.8 (3.2)	43.2 (6.2)	47.2 (8.4)	50.7 (10.4)	51.6 (10.9)	48.0 (8.9)	41.5 (5.3)	36.1 (2.3)	32.7 (0.4)	40.8 (4.9)
Mean minimum °F (°C)	24.3 (−4.3)	24.5 (−4.2)	28.5 (−1.9)	31.3 (−0.4)	35.3 (1.8)	40.4 (4.7)	44.2 (6.8)	44.9 (7.2)	40.6 (4.8)	32.6 (0.3)	27.1 (−2.7)	23.5 (−4.7)	18.9 (−7.3)
Record low °F (°C)	2 (−17)	8 (−13)	15 (−9)	26 (−3)	29 (−2)	32 (0)	31 (−1)	36 (2)	32 (0)	21 (−6)	10 (−12)	8 (−13)	2 (−17)
Average precipitation inches (mm)	8.87 (225)	6.14 (156)	6.94 (176)	3.28 (83)	1.91 (49)	1.39 (35)	0.74 (19)	1.14 (29)	1.63 (41)	5.85 (149)	10.06 (256)	9.92 (252)	57.87 (1,470)
Average precipitation days (≥ 0.01 in)	17.8	15.4	18.2	13.8	11.5	9.5	4.9	4.8	8.0	15.0	18.6	18.4	155.9
Source 1: NOAA
Source 2: XMACIS

Climate data for Buckinghorse, Washington (2008-2025)
Month	Jan	Feb	Mar	Apr	May	Jun	Jul	Aug	Sep	Oct	Nov	Dec	Year
Record high °F (°C)	66 (19)	65 (18)	63 (17)	68 (20)	72 (22)	90 (32)	84 (29)	87 (31)	81 (27)	72 (22)	64 (18)	59 (15)	90 (32)
Mean maximum °F (°C)	53 (12)	52 (11)	53 (12)	59 (15)	66 (19)	73 (23)	78 (26)	80 (27)	75 (24)	65 (18)	55 (13)	49 (9)	81 (27)
Mean daily maximum °F (°C)	39.5 (4.2)	37.0 (2.8)	39.1 (3.9)	44.1 (6.7)	52.0 (11.1)	57.3 (14.1)	66.0 (18.9)	66.5 (19.2)	57.6 (14.2)	48.7 (9.3)	40.3 (4.6)	36.7 (2.6)	48.7 (9.3)
Daily mean °F (°C)	34.3 (1.3)	31.0 (−0.6)	32.8 (0.4)	36.8 (2.7)	44.2 (6.8)	49.1 (9.5)	57.0 (13.9)	57.9 (14.4)	50.5 (10.3)	42.8 (6.0)	35.1 (1.7)	31.6 (−0.2)	41.9 (5.5)
Mean daily minimum °F (°C)	29.5 (−1.4)	24.9 (−3.9)	26.5 (−3.1)	29.5 (−1.4)	36.4 (2.4)	41.0 (5.0)	48.1 (8.9)	49.2 (9.6)	43.4 (6.3)	37.0 (2.8)	29.9 (−1.2)	26.5 (−3.1)	35.2 (1.7)
Mean minimum °F (°C)	15 (−9)	12 (−11)	16 (−9)	20 (−7)	27 (−3)	32 (0)	37 (3)	39 (4)	33 (1)	26 (−3)	18 (−8)	13 (−11)	5 (−15)
Record low °F (°C)	−3 (−19)	2 (−17)	8 (−13)	16 (−9)	21 (−6)	28 (−2)	34 (1)	35 (2)	28 (−2)	18 (−8)	−3 (−19)	−4 (−20)	−4 (−20)
Average precipitation inches (mm)	21.26 (540)	13.17 (335)	14.50 (368)	8.24 (209)	4.72 (120)	2.21 (56)	1.10 (28)	2.89 (73)	4.26 (108)	13.55 (344)	24.45 (621)	19.30 (490)	129.65 (3,292)
Average extreme snow depth inches (cm)	94 (240)	113 (290)	148 (380)	149 (380)	123 (310)	64 (160)	16 (41)	2 (5.1)	0 (0)	8 (20)	37 (94)	70 (180)	156 (400)
Average precipitation days (≥ 0.01 in)	18.2	16.7	19.1	15.3	10.7	7.0	2.8	4.7	10.7	16.4	20.1	19.3	161
Source: NOAA

Climate data for Hoh Rainforest Visitor Center (elevation: 745 ft / 227 m), 1981–2010
Month	Jan	Feb	Mar	Apr	May	Jun	Jul	Aug	Sep	Oct	Nov	Dec	Year
Mean daily maximum °F (°C)	44.7 (7.1)	47.9 (8.8)	51.4 (10.8)	55.8 (13.2)	61.8 (16.6)	65.4 (18.6)	70.8 (21.6)	72.2 (22.3)	67.4 (19.7)	58.8 (14.9)	48.9 (9.4)	43.9 (6.6)	57.5 (14.2)
Daily mean °F (°C)	39.8 (4.3)	41.2 (5.1)	43.5 (6.4)	46.8 (8.2)	52.1 (11.2)	56.1 (13.4)	60.5 (15.8)	61.3 (16.3)	57.5 (14.2)	50.8 (10.4)	43.2 (6.2)	38.8 (3.8)	49.3 (9.6)
Mean daily minimum °F (°C)	34.8 (1.6)	34.4 (1.3)	35.6 (2.0)	37.8 (3.2)	42.4 (5.8)	46.8 (8.2)	50.1 (10.1)	50.5 (10.3)	47.6 (8.7)	42.7 (5.9)	37.6 (3.1)	33.8 (1.0)	41.2 (5.1)
Average precipitation inches (mm)	20.59 (523)	14.45 (367)	14.78 (375)	10.60 (269)	6.39 (162)	4.68 (119)	2.16 (55)	2.76 (70)	4.15 (105)	13.11 (333)	22.55 (573)	19.07 (484)	135.29 (3,436)
Average relative humidity (%)	85.1	76.0	76.8	74.1	71.9	73.9	68.8	69.9	69.0	74.2	83.0	83.1	75.5
Average dew point °F (°C)	35.7 (2.1)	34.2 (1.2)	36.7 (2.6)	39.0 (3.9)	43.3 (6.3)	47.9 (8.8)	50.2 (10.1)	51.4 (10.8)	47.4 (8.6)	42.9 (6.1)	38.4 (3.6)	34.1 (1.2)	41.8 (5.4)
Source: PRISM Climate Group

== Human history ==
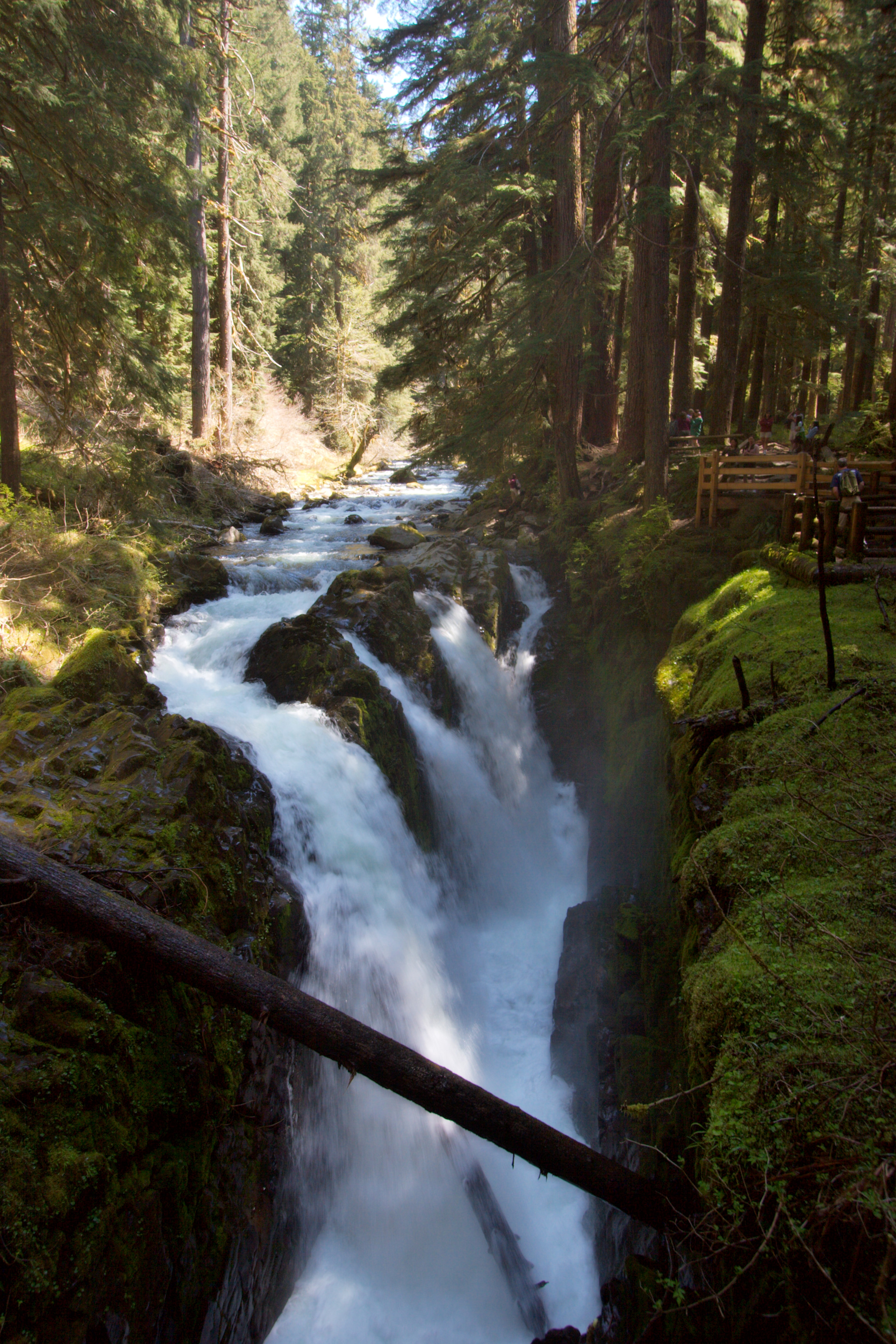
Sol Duc Falls, meaning "sparkling waters" in the Quileute language

Before the influx of European settlers, Olympic's human population consisted of Native Americans, whose use of the peninsula was thought to have consisted mainly of fishing and hunting. However, recent reviews of the record, coupled with systematic archaeological surveys of the mountains (Olympic and other Northwest ranges) are pointing to much more extensive tribal use of especially the subalpine meadows than seemed formerly to be the case. Most if not all Pacific Northwest indigenous cultures were adversely affected by European diseases (often decimated) and other factors, well before ethnographers, business operations and settlers arrived in the region, so what they saw and recorded was a much-reduced native culture base. Large numbers of cultural sites are now identified in the Olympic mountains, and important artifacts have been found.

When settlers began to appear, extractive industry in the Pacific Northwest was on the rise, particularly in regards to the harvesting of timber, which began heavily in the late 19th and early 20th centuries. Public dissent against logging began to take hold in the 1920s, when people got their first glimpses of the clear-cut hillsides. This period saw an explosion of people's interest in the outdoors; with the growing use of the automobile, people took to touring previously remote places like the Olympic Peninsula.

The formal record of a proposal for a new national park on the Olympic Peninsula begins with the expeditions of well-known figures Lieutenant Joseph P. O'Neil and Judge James Wickersham, during the 1890s. These notables met in the Olympic wilderness while exploring, and subsequently combined their political efforts to have the area placed within some protected status. On February 22, 1897, President Grover Cleveland created the Olympic Forest Reserve, which became Olympic National Forest in 1907. Following unsuccessful efforts in the Washington State Legislature to further protect the area in the early 1900s, President Theodore Roosevelt created Mount Olympus National Monument in 1909, primarily to protect the subalpine calving grounds and summer range of the Roosevelt elk herds native to the Olympics.

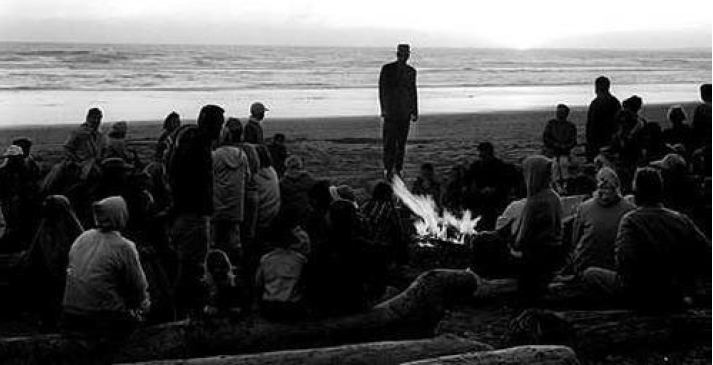
A park ranger gives a sunset naturalist talk at the park, ca. 1960.

Public desire for preservation of some of the area grew until President Franklin D. Roosevelt signed a bill creating a national park in 1938. The Civilian Conservation Corps constructed a headquarters in 1939 with funds from the Public Works Administration. It is now on the National Register of Historic Places. The national park was expanded by 47,753 acres (19,325 ha) in 1953 to include the Pacific coastline between the Queets and Hoh rivers, as well as portions of the Queets and Bogachiel valleys.

Even after ONP was declared a park, though, illegal logging continued in the park, and political battles continue to this day over the incredibly valuable timber contained within its boundaries. Logging continues on the Olympic Peninsula, but not within the park. The Olympic Wilderness, a designated wilderness area, was established by the federal government in 1988 that contained 877,000 acres (355,000 ha) within Olympic National Park. It was renamed the Daniel J. Evans Wilderness in 2017 to honor Governor and U.S. Senator Daniel J. Evans, who had co-sponsored the 1988 legislation. A proposed expansion of the wilderness area by 125,000 acres (51,000 ha) in 2022 was not successful.

== Fauna ==
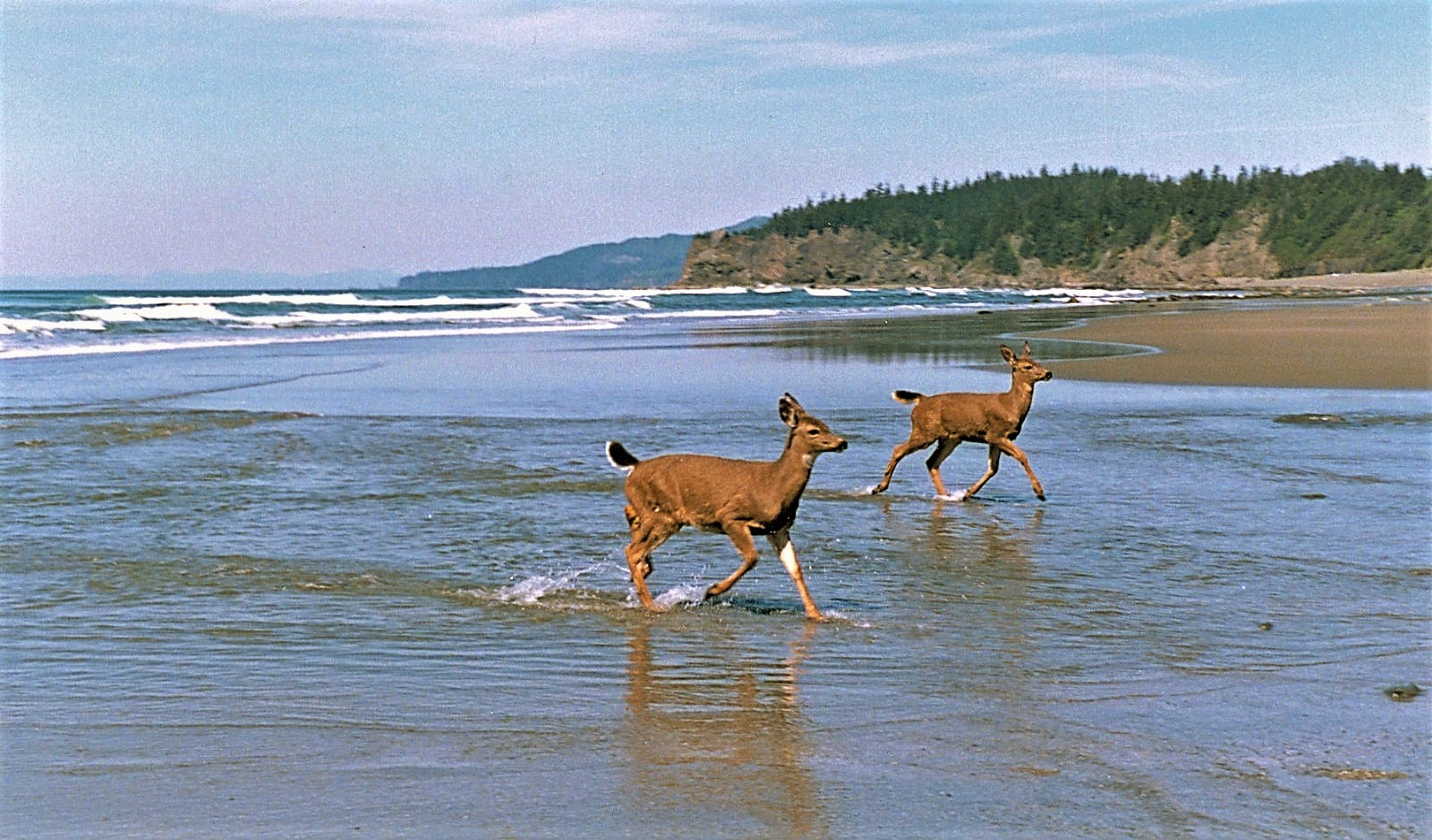
Shi Shi Beach

Animals that inhabit this national park include chipmunks, squirrels, skunks, six species of bats, weasels, coyotes, muskrats, fishers, river otters, beavers, red foxes, mountain goats, martens, bobcats, black bears, Canadian lynxes, moles, snowshoe hares, shrews, and cougars. Whales, dolphins, sea lions, seals, and sea otters swim near this park offshore. Birds that fly in this park including raptors are winter wrens, Canada jays, Hammond's flycatchers, Wilson's warblers, blue grouse, pine siskins, ravens, spotted owls, red-breasted nuthatches, golden-crowned kinglets, chestnut-backed chickadees, Swainson's thrushes, red crossbills, hermit thrushes, olive-sided flycatchers, bald eagles, western tanagers, northern pygmy owls, Townsend's warblers, Townsend's solitaires, Vaux's swifts, band-tailed pigeons, and evening grosbeaks.

== Recreation ==
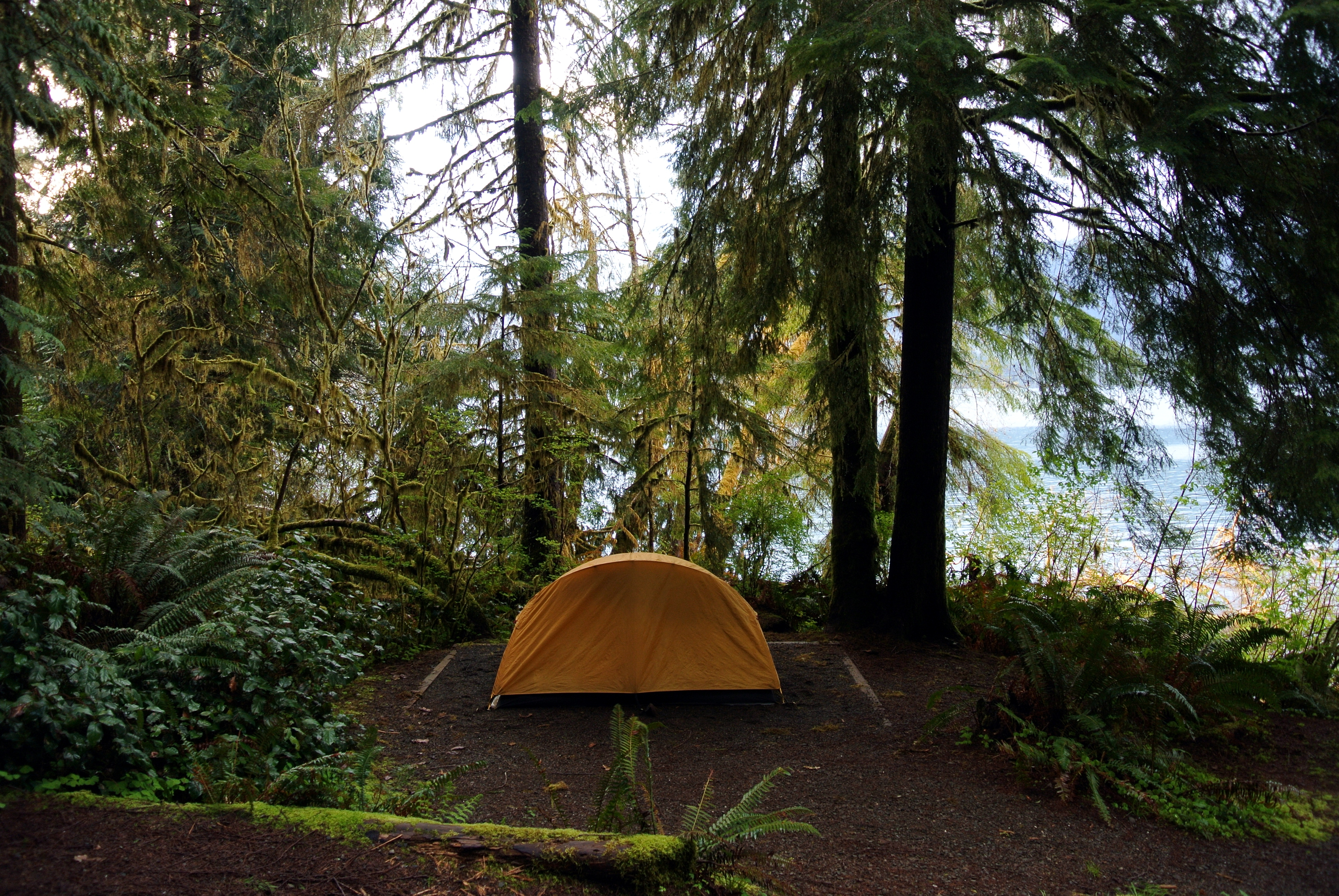
Camping site on the shores of Lake Quinault

There are several roads in the park, but none penetrate far into the interior. The park features a network of hiking trails, although the size and remoteness mean that it will usually take more than a weekend to get to the high country in the interior. The sights of the rain forest, with plants run riot and dozens of hues of green, are well worth the possibility of rain sometime during the trip, although July, August, and September frequently have long dry spells.

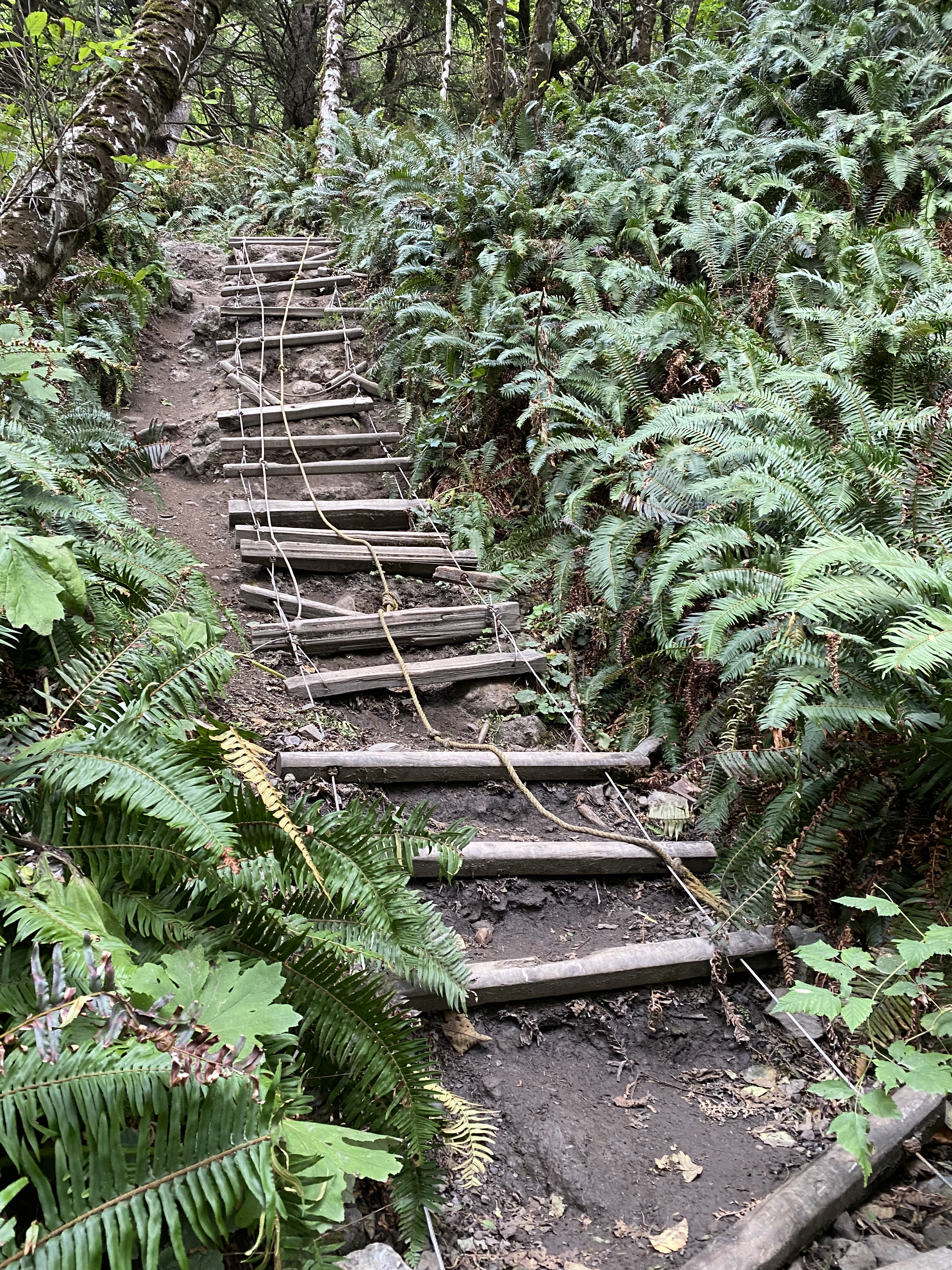
Rope ladder used to climb inland to round impassable capes when backpacking along the coast

An unusual feature of ONP is the opportunity for backpacking along the beach. The length of the coastline in the park is sufficient for multi-day trips, with the entire day spent walking along the beach. Although idyllic compared to toiling up a mountainside (Seven Lakes Basin is a notable example), one must be aware of the tide; at the narrowest parts of the beaches, the high tide washes up to the cliffs behind, blocking passage. Several promontories must be struggled over, using a combination of muddy steep trails and fixed ropes.

During winter, the viewpoint known as Hurricane Ridge offers numerous winter sports activities. The Hurricane Ridge Winter Sports Club operates Hurricane Ridge Ski and Snowboard Area, a not-for-profit alpine ski area that offers ski lessons, rentals, and inexpensive lift tickets. The small alpine area is serviced by two rope tows and one poma lift. A large amount of backcountry terrain is accessible for skiers, snowboarders, and other backcountry travelers when Hurricane Ridge Road is open. Winter access to Hurricane Ridge Road is currently limited to Friday through Sunday weather permitting. The Hurricane Ridge Winter Access Coalition is a community effort to restore seven-day-a-week access via the Hurricane Ridge Road (the only park road accessing alpine terrain in winter).

Rafting is available on both the Elwha and Hoh Rivers. Boating is common on Ozette Lake, Lake Crescent, and Lake Quinault. Fishing is allowed in the Ozette River, Queets River (below Tshletshy Creek), Hoh River, Quinault River (below North Shore Quinault River Bridge), Quillayute River and Dickey River. A fishing license is not required to fish in the park. Fishing for bull trout and Dolly Varden trout is not allowed and must be released if incidentally caught.

Views of the Olympic National Park can be seen from the Hurricane Ridge viewpoint. The road leading west from the Hurricane Ridge visitor center has several picnic areas and trailheads. A paved trail called the Hurricane Hill trail is about 1.6 miles (2.6 km) long each way, with an elevation gain of about 700 feet (210 m). It is not uncommon to find snow on the trails even as late as July. Several other dirt trails of varying distances and difficulty levels branch off of the Hurricane hill trail. The picnic areas are open only in the summer and have restrooms, water, and paved access to picnic tables.

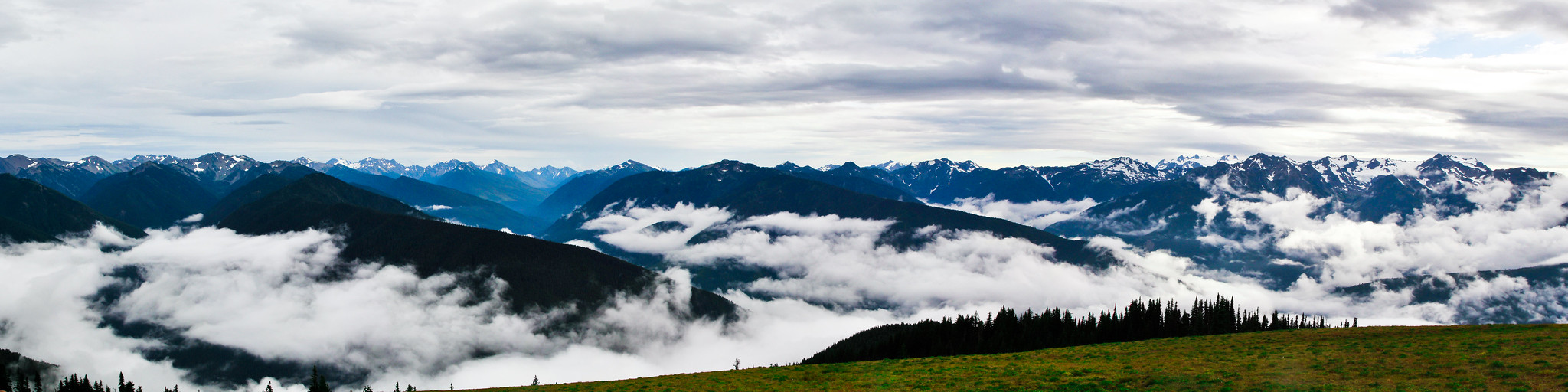
A foggy day at Hurricane Ridge, as seen from the visitor center

The Hurricane Ridge visitor center burned down on May 7, 2023. Constructed in the 1950s, it contained a 3D topographical map of the Olympics, a media center which showed nature documentaries of the area as well as other interpretive exhibits, and a gift shop. There is currently no timeline for when the center will be replaced; the project to rebuild the lodge and establish a temporary visitors' center was allocated $80 million in federal funding in late 2023.

In March of 2026, Washington's National Parks Fund provided a grant of $768,483 to support infrastructure improvements and youth science programs within the park. Park leadership specifically mentioned search and rescue training and equipment, astronomy programs, and mules for back county trail work as uses for the funds.

== Elwha Ecosystem Restoration Project ==
The Elwha Ecosystem Restoration Project is the second-largest ecosystem restoration project in the history of the National Park Service after the Everglades. It consisted of removing the 210-foot (64 m) Glines Canyon Dam and draining its reservoir, Lake Mills and removing the 108-foot (33 m) Elwha Dam and its reservoir Lake Aldwell from the Elwha River. Upon removal, the park will revegetate the slopes and river bottoms to prevent erosion and speed up ecological recovery. The primary purpose of this project is to restore anadromous stocks of Pacific Salmon and steelhead to the Elwha River, which have been denied access to the upper 65 miles (105 km) of river habitat for more than 95 years by these dams. Removal of the dams was completed in 2014.

== See also ==
- List of national parks of the United States
- Madison Creek Falls
- La Push Beach
- Ruby Beach
- Rialto Beach
- Sol Duc River
- National Register of Historic Places listings in Olympic National Park
