= National Register of Historic Places listings in Clallam County, Washington =

Location of Clallam County in Washington

This is a list of the National Register of Historic Places listings in Clallam County, Washington.

This is intended to be a complete list of the properties and districts on the National Register of Historic Places in Clallam County, Washington, United States. Latitude and longitude coordinates are provided for many National Register properties and districts; these locations may be seen together in a map.

There are 49 properties and districts listed on the National Register in the county.

This National Park Service list is complete through NPS recent listings posted December 12, 2025.

== Current listings ==
	Name on the Register	Image	Date listed	Location	City or town	Description
1	Aircraft Warning Service Observation Tower	Aircraft Warning Service Observation Tower	April 29, 1993 (#93000363)	216 Spring Road; 48°06′08″N 123°15′01″W	Agnew	
2	Altair Campground Community Kitchen	Altair Campground Community Kitchen	July 13, 2007 (#07000732)	Along Elwha River, about 3.4 miles (5.5 km) south of Elwha, in Olympic National Park; 48°00′41″N 123°35′34″W	Port Angeles	Destroyed by flood in November 2015.
3	Beaver School	Beaver School	November 19, 1992 (#92001591)	Along US 101, about 1.9 miles (3.1 km) northeast of Beaver; 48°03′49″N 124°18′30″W	Beaver	Included in the Rural Public Schools of Washington State MPS.
4	Blue Mountain School	Blue Mountain School	November 5, 1987 (#87001938)	1986 Blue Mountain Road, about 8.7 miles (14.0 km) southeast of Port Angeles; 48°03′01″N 123°16′29″W	Port Angeles	
5	Canyon Creek Shelter	Canyon Creek Shelter	July 13, 2007 (#07000712)	About 0.68 miles (1.09 km) from Sol Duc Trailhead, and about 21.3 miles (34.3 km) southwest of Port Angeles, in Olympic National Park; 47°57′08″N 123°49′15″W	Port Angeles	
6	Clallam County Courthouse	Clallam County Courthouse	September 2, 1987 (#87001459)	319 Lincoln Street; 48°06′57″N 123°26′00″W	Port Angeles	Also a contributing property to Port Angeles Civic Historic District
7	Dungeness River Bridge	Dungeness River Bridge	July 16, 1982 (#82004201)	Spans Dungeness River at Railroad Bridge Park, at end of West Hendrickson Road; 48°05′07″N 123°08′52″W	Sequim	
8	Dungeness School	Dungeness School	May 19, 1988 (#88000627)	657 Towne Road; 48°08′34″N 123°07′42″W	Dungeness	
9	Eagle Ranger Station	Eagle Ranger Station	July 13, 2007 (#07000713)	Along Upper Sol Duc Road, about 22.4 miles (36.0 km) southwest of Port Angeles, in Olympic National Park; 47°58′20″N 123°51′52″W	Port Angeles	
10	Elkhorn Guard Station		July 13, 2007 (#07000714)	Along Elwha River Trail, about 14.3 miles (23.0 km) south of Elwha, in Olympic National Forest; 47°52′23″N 123°28′10″W	Port Angeles	
11	Elwha Campground Community Kitchen	Elwha Campground Community Kitchen	July 13, 2007 (#07000735)	Along Elwha River, about 2.3 miles (3.7 km) south of Elwha, in Olympic National Park; 48°01′40″N 123°35′17″W	Port Angeles	Possibly damaged by flood in November 2015.
12	Elwha Ranger Station	Elwha Ranger Station	July 13, 2007 (#07000716)	Along Elwha River, about 3 miles (4.8 km) south of Elwha, in Olympic National Park; 48°00′59″N 123°35′26″W	Port Angeles	
13	Elwha River Bridge	Elwha River Bridge	July 16, 1982 (#82004200)	Spans Elwha River on Elwha River Road, about 5.6 miles (9.0 km) west of Port Angeles; 48°06′50″N 123°33′13″W	Port Angeles	
14	Elwha River Hydroelectric Power Plant	Elwha River Hydroelectric Power Plant	December 15, 1988 (#88002741)	On Elwha River, end of Lower Dam Road, about 6 miles (9.7 km) southwest of Port Angeles; 48°05′42″N 123°33′24″W	Port Angeles	Dam demolished in 2014.
15	Emery Farmstead	Emery Farmstead	December 16, 1988 (#88002746)	At junction of Emery Road and Emery Lane, about 8.5 miles (13.7 km) southeast of Port Angeles; 48°04′12″N 123°15′46″W	Port Angeles	
16	Fifteen Mile Shelter		July 13, 2007 (#07000715)	Along North Fork Bogachiel River Trail, about 31 miles (50 km) southwest of Port Angeles, in Olympic National Park; 47°54′10″N 124°01′19″W	Port Angeles	
1	Glines Canyon Hydroelectric Power Plant	Glines Canyon Hydroelectric Power Plant	December 15, 1988 (#88002742)	On Elwha River, along Olympic Hot Springs Road, about 11 miles (18 km) southwest of Port Angeles, in Olympic National Park; 48°00′07″N 123°36′00″W	Port Angeles	Dam demolished in 2012.
2	Hoko River Archeological Site		March 21, 1978 (#78002735)	Address restricted	Pysht	
3	Hoko River Rockshelter Archeological Site		March 27, 1980 (#80003997)	Address restricted	Sekiu	
4	Humes Ranch Cabin	Humes Ranch Cabin	September 14, 1977 (#77001332)	On Elwha River, along Geyser Valley trail, about 12.7 miles (20.4 km) southwest of Port Angeles, in Olympic National Park; 47°56′59″N 123°32′48″W	Port Angeles	
5	Hyak Shelter		July 13, 2007 (#07000721)	Along North Fork Bogachiel River Trail, about 28.4 miles (45.7 km) southwest of Port Angeles, in Olympic National Park; 47°55′22″N 123°58′24″W	Port Angeles	Included in the Olympic National Park MPS.
1	John A. Hyer Farm	John A. Hyer Farm	July 29, 1994 (#94000797)	Address restricted	Sequim	
2	Manis Mastodon Site	Manis Mastodon Site	March 21, 1978 (#78002736)	Address restricted	Sequim	
3	Masonic Temple	Masonic Temple	May 11, 1989 (#89000400)	622 South Lincoln Street; 48°06′49″N 123°26′12″W	Port Angeles	
4	McAlmond House	McAlmond House	August 9, 1976 (#76001879)	242 Twin View Drive; 48°08′48″N 123°08′07″W	Sequim	
5	Michael's Cabin	Michael's Cabin	July 13, 2007 (#07000733)	Along Elwha River Trail, about 7.7 miles (12.4 km) southeast of Elwha, in Olympic National Forest; 47°57′11″N 123°33′15″W	Port Angeles	Included in the Olympic National Park MPS.
6	Naval Lodge Elks Building	Naval Lodge Elks Building	May 2, 1986 (#86000956)	131 East First Street; 48°07′07″N 123°25′55″W	Port Angeles	
7	New Dungeness Light Station	New Dungeness Light Station	November 30, 1993 (#93001338)	On Dungeness Spit, about 7 miles (11 km) north of Sequim; 48°10′54″N 123°06′37″W	Sequim	
8	North Fork Sol Duc Shelter		July 13, 2007 (#07000725)	Along North Fork Sol Duc River Trail, about 17.3 miles (27.8 km) southwest of Port Angeles, in Olympic National Park; 47°59′59″N 123°45′48″W	Port Angeles	
9	Olympic National Park Headquarters Historic District	Olympic National Park Headquarters Historic District	July 13, 2007 (#07000720)	600 East Park Avenue; 48°05′59″N 123°25′57″W	Port Angeles	
10	Ozette Indian Village Archeological Site	Ozette Indian Village Archeological Site	January 11, 1974 (#74000916)	Address restricted	La Push	
11	Joseph Paris House	Joseph Paris House	November 5, 1987 (#87001939)	101 East 5th Street; 48°06′56″N 123°26′11″W	Port Angeles	
12	Port Angeles Civic Historic District	Port Angeles Civic Historic District	May 4, 2011 (#11000259)	207, 215, 217 and 319 South Lincoln Street; 48°06′59″N 123°25′59″W	Port Angeles	Includes former Carnegie Library (1918), former Fire Hall and City Building (1930), Veteran's Memorial Park and former Clallam County Courthouse, which is individually listed on the register.
13	Pyramid Peak Aircraft Warning Service Lookout	Pyramid Peak Aircraft Warning Service Lookout	July 13, 2007 (#07000726)	End of Pyramid Peak Trail, about 17.6 miles (28.3 km) west of Port Angeles, Washington, in Olympic National Park; 48°04′28″N 123°48′28″W	Port Angeles	
14	Peter Roose Homestead	Peter Roose Homestead	July 13, 2007 (#07000723)	About 0.4 miles (0.64 km) north of Cape Alava Trail, 1.9 miles (3.1 km) west of Ozette, in Olympic National Park; 48°09′42″N 124°42′25″W	Port Angeles	
15	Rosemary Inn	Rosemary Inn	July 17, 1979 (#79001033)	East of Barnes Point, on south shore of Lake Crescent, about 17.2 miles (27.7 km) southwest of Port Angeles, in Olympic National Park; 48°03′35″N 123°47′39″W	Port Angeles	
16	St. Andrew's Episcopal Church	St. Andrew's Episcopal Church	November 5, 1987 (#87001942)	206 South Peabody Street; 48°06′57″N 123°25′46″W	Port Angeles	
17	Sekiu School	Sekiu School	May 1, 1991 (#91000539)	42 Rice Street; 48°15′47″N 124°18′08″W	Sekiu	Included in the Rural Public Schools of Washington State MPS
18	Sequim Opera House	Sequim Opera House	May 28, 1991 (#91000632)	119 North Sequim Avenue; 48°04′48″N 123°06′09″W	Sequim	
19	Singer's Lake Crescent Tavern	Singer's Lake Crescent Tavern	July 13, 2007 (#07000724)	South of Barnes Point, on south shore of Lake Crescent, about 17.4 miles (28.0 km) southwest of Port Angeles, in Olympic National Park; 48°03′26″N 123°47′57″W	Port Angeles	
20	Slip Point Light Station	Slip Point Light Station	May 16, 2023 (#100009001)	Eastern end of Clallam Bay; 48°15′52″N 124°15′04″W	Clallam Bay vicinity	
21	Storm King Ranger Station	Storm King Ranger Station	July 13, 2007 (#07000730)	Southeast of Barnes Point, on south shore of Lake Crescent, about 17 miles (27 km) southwest of Port Angeles, in Olympic National Park; 48°03′28″N 123°47′19″W	Port Angeles	
22	Tatoosh Island	Tatoosh Island	March 16, 1972 (#72001267)	Off Cape Flattery; 48°23′31″N 124°44′10″W	Olympic Peninsula	
23	Three Forks Shelter		July 13, 2007 (#07000728)	At confluence of Grand Creek and Cameron Creek, along Three Forks Trail, about 13.2 miles (21.2 km) southwest of Sequim, in Olympic National Park; 47°54′56″N 123°14′52″W	Sequim	Included in the Olympic National Park MPS.
24	Tse whit zen Village	Tse whit zen Village	October 8, 2014 (#14000848)	Address restricted	Port Angeles	
25	U.S. Post Office	U.S. Post Office	September 1, 1983 (#83003321)	138 West 1st Street; 48°07′10″N 123°26′07″W	Port Angeles	The main floor is in use as the regional Social Security Administration office. The second floor houses U.S. Customs and Border Protection offices to serve the Port of Entry at the MV Coho ferry dock.
26	US Quarantine Station Surgeon's Residence	US Quarantine Station Surgeon's Residence	May 11, 1989 (#89000401)	101 Discovery Way, Diamond Point; 48°05′37″N 122°55′13″W	Sequim	
27	Wedding Rock Petroglyphs	Wedding Rock Petroglyphs	April 3, 1976 (#76000951)	Address restricted	Forks	
28	Wendel Property		July 13, 2007 (#07000739)	3723 East Beach Road, 0.5 miles (0.80 km) west of Piedmont, about 17.2 miles (27.7 km) west of Port Angeles, in Olympic National Park; 48°05′41″N 123°48′07″W	Port Angeles	

== See also ==
- National Register of Historic Places listings in Washington state
- List of National Historic Landmarks in Washington (state)
