= National Register of Historic Places listings in Olympic National Park =

This is a list of the National Register of Historic Places listings in Olympic National Park.

This is intended to be a complete list of the properties and districts on the National Register of Historic Places in Olympic National Park, Washington, United States. The locations of National Register properties and districts for which the latitude and longitude coordinates are included below, may be seen in a Google map.

There are 33 properties and districts listed on the National Register in the park.

This National Park Service list is complete through NPS recent listings posted September 26, 2025.

== Current listings ==
	Name on the Register	Image	Date listed	Location	City or town	Description
1	Altair Campground Community Kitchen	Altair Campground Community Kitchen	July 13, 2007 (#07000732)	Along Elwha River, about 3.4 miles (5.5 km) south of Elwha; 48°00′41″N 123°35′34″W	Port Angeles	Campground central kitchen built by the Civilian Conservation Corps. Possibly damaged by flood in November 2015.
2	Botten Cabin	Botten Cabin	July 13, 2007 (#07000729)	20.9 mi. from Whiskey Bend Trailhead on the Elwha River Trail; 47°45′50″N 123°27′16″W	Port Angeles	
3	Canyon Creek Shelter	Canyon Creek Shelter	July 13, 2007 (#07000712)	About 0.68 miles (1.09 km) from Sol Duc Trailhead, and about 21.3 miles (34.3 km) southwest of Port Angeles; 47°57′08″N 123°49′15″W	Port Angeles	Rustic trail shelter
4	Dodger Point Fire Lookout	Dodger Point Fire Lookout	July 13, 2007 (#07000736)	Mile 13 of Dodger Point Trail, about 17.2 miles (27.7 km) south of Port Angeles; 47°52′27″N 123°30′36″W	Port Angeles	
5	Eagle Ranger Station	Eagle Ranger Station	July 13, 2007 (#07000713)	Along Upper Sol Duc Road, about 22.4 miles (36.0 km) southwest of Port Angeles; 47°58′20″N 123°51′52″W	Port Angeles	
6	Elkhorn Guard Station		July 13, 2007 (#07000714)	Along Elwha River Trail, about 14.3 miles (23.0 km) south of Elwha; 47°52′23″N 123°28′10″W	Port Angeles	
7	Elk Lick Lodge		July 13, 2007 (#07000734)	13 mi. from Whiskey Bend Trailhead on the Elwha River Trail; 47°51′26″N 123°28′09″W	Port Angeles	
8	Elwha Campground Community Kitchen	Elwha Campground Community Kitchen	July 13, 2007 (#07000735)	Along Elwha River, about 2.3 miles (3.7 km) south of Elwha; 48°01′40″N 123°35′17″W	Port Angeles	Campground kitchen built by the Civilian Conservation Corps. Possibly damaged by flood in November 2015.
9	Elwha Ranger Station	Elwha Ranger Station	July 13, 2007 (#07000716)	Along Elwha River, about 3 miles (4.8 km) south of Elwha; 48°00′59″N 123°35′26″W	Port Angeles	
10	Enchanted Valley Chalet	Enchanted Valley Chalet	July 13, 2007 (#07000737)	13 mi. upriver from Graves Cr. Trailhead; 47°40′31″N 123°23′21″W	Port Angeles	Backcountry concessioner lodge, now threatened by deterioration and shifting river channels
11	Fifteen Mile Shelter		July 13, 2007 (#07000715)	Along North Fork Bogachiel River Trail, about 31 miles (50 km) southwest of Port Angeles; 47°54′10″N 124°01′19″W	Port Angeles	
12	Glines Canyon Hydroelectric Power Plant	Glines Canyon Hydroelectric Power Plant	December 15, 1988 (#88002742)	On Elwha River, along Olympic Hot Springs Road, about 11 miles (18 km) southwest of Port Angeles; 48°00′07″N 123°36′00″W	Port Angeles	Dam demolished in 2012.
13	Graves Creek Ranger Station	Graves Creek Ranger Station	July 13, 2007 (#07000717)	Approx. 22 mi. NE of WA 101 on Quinault River Rd. 47°34′09″N 123°34′40″W	Port Angeles	
14	Happy Four Shelter	Happy Four Shelter	July 13, 2007 (#07000719)	Approx. 5.4 along Hoh River Trail; 47°52′06″N 123°49′41″W	Port Angeles	
15	Hayes River Fire Cache		July 13, 2007 (#07000738)	Approx. 16.8 mi. up the Elwha River Trail; 47°48′34″N 123°27′09″W	Port Angeles	
16	Humes Ranch Cabin	Humes Ranch Cabin	September 14, 1977 (#77001332)	On Elwha River, along Geyser Valley trail, about 12.7 miles (20.4 km) southwest of Port Angeles; 47°56′59″N 123°32′48″W	Port Angeles	
17	Hyak Shelter		July 13, 2007 (#07000721)	Along North Fork Bogachiel River Trail, about 28.4 miles (45.7 km) southwest of Port Angeles; 47°55′22″N 123°58′24″W	Port Angeles	Included in the Olympic National Park MPS.
18	Kestner Homestead	Kestner Homestead	July 13, 2007 (#07000741)	Quinault River Valley, .5 mi. N of Quinault River Ranger Station, along west side of Kestner Creek, Quinault sub-distr 47°30′32″N 123°49′03″W	Port Angeles	
19	Michael's Cabin	Michael's Cabin	July 13, 2007 (#07000733)	Along Elwha River Trail, about 7.7 miles (12.4 km) southeast of Elwha, in Olympic National Forest; 47°57′11″N 123°33′15″W	Port Angeles	Included in the Olympic National Park MPS.
20	North Fork Quinault Ranger Station	North Fork Quinault Ranger Station	July 13, 2007 (#07000718)	Approx. 18 mi. NE of WA 101 on N. Fork Rd. off N. Shore Quinault Rd. 47°34′26″N 123°38′50″W	Port Angeles	
21	North Fork Sol Duc Shelter		July 13, 2007 (#07000725)	Along North Fork Sol Duc River Trail, about 17.3 miles (27.8 km) southwest of Port Angeles; 47°59′59″N 123°45′48″W	Port Angeles	Rustic trail shelter
22	Olympic National Park Headquarters Historic District	Olympic National Park Headquarters Historic District	July 13, 2007 (#07000720)	600 East Park Avenue; 48°05′59″N 123°25′57″W	Port Angeles	
23	Olympus Guard Station		November 5, 2007 (#07000722)	Approx. 9 mi. from Hoh River Trailhead at Hoh Ranger Station; 47°52′35″N 123°45′52″W	Port Angeles	
24	Ozette Indian Village Archeological Site	Ozette Indian Village Archeological Site	January 11, 1974 (#74000916)	Address restricted	La Push	
25	Pelton Creek Shelter		July 13, 2007 (#07000727)	Approximately 15.5 miles (24.9 km) up the Queets River Trail; 47°42′09″N 123°45′48″W	Port Angeles	
26	Pyramid Peak Aircraft Warning Service Lookout	Pyramid Peak Aircraft Warning Service Lookout	July 13, 2007 (#07000726)	End of Pyramid Peak Trail, about 17.6 miles (28.3 km) west of Port Angeles, Washington; 48°04′28″N 123°48′28″W	Port Angeles	Purpose-built station for early warning of airborne intruders during World War II
27	Peter Roose Homestead	Peter Roose Homestead	July 13, 2007 (#07000723)	About 0.4 miles (0.64 km) north of Cape Alava Trail, 1.9 miles (3.1 km) west of Ozette; 48°09′42″N 124°42′25″W	Port Angeles	
28	Rosemary Inn	Rosemary Inn	July 17, 1979 (#79001033)	East of Barnes Point, on south shore of Lake Crescent, about 17.2 miles (27.7 km) southwest of Port Angeles; 48°03′35″N 123°47′39″W	Port Angeles	
29	Singer's Lake Crescent Tavern	Singer's Lake Crescent Tavern	July 13, 2007 (#07000724)	South of Barnes Point, on south shore of Lake Crescent, about 17.4 miles (28.0 km) southwest of Port Angeles; 48°03′26″N 123°47′57″W	Port Angeles	
30	Storm King Ranger Station	Storm King Ranger Station	July 13, 2007 (#07000730)	Southeast of Barnes Point, on south shore of Lake Crescent, about 17 miles (27 km) southwest of Port Angeles; 48°03′28″N 123°47′19″W	Port Angeles	
31	Three Forks Shelter		July 13, 2007 (#07000728)	At confluence of Grand Creek and Cameron Creek, along Three Forks Trail, about 13.2 miles (21.2 km) southwest of Sequim; 47°54′56″N 123°14′52″W	Sequim	Included in the Olympic National Park MPS.
32	Wedding Rock Petroglyphs	Wedding Rock Petroglyphs	April 3, 1976 (#76000951)	Address restricted	Forks	
33	Wendel Property		July 13, 2007 (#07000739)	3723 East Beach Road, 0.5 miles (0.80 km) west of Piedmont, about 17.2 miles (27.7 km) west of Port Angeles; 48°05′41″N 123°48′07″W	Port Angeles	

== See also ==
- National Register of Historic Places listings in Clallam County, Washington
- National Register of Historic Places listings in Grays Harbor County, Washington
- National Register of Historic Places listings in Jefferson County, Washington
- National Register of Historic Places listings in Washington
