= Botten =

Botten may refer to:

== People ==
- Bill Botten (born 1935), British illustrator, designer and artist
- Botten Soot (1895–1958), Norwegian actress, singer, and dancer
- Else-May Botten (born 1973), Norwegian politician
- Jackie Botten (1938–2006), South African cricketer
- Paul Botten-Hansen (1824–1869), Norwegian librarian, book collector, magazine editor, and literary critic
- Robert Botten (1853-1935), Australian cricketer

== Places ==
- Botten, Telemark, a village in Bamble municipality in Telemark county, Norway
- Botten Cabin, a historic building in Washington, United States

== See also ==
- Bottens, a municipality of Vaud, Switzerland
