= Dodger Point Fire Lookout =

- U.S. National Register of Historic Places
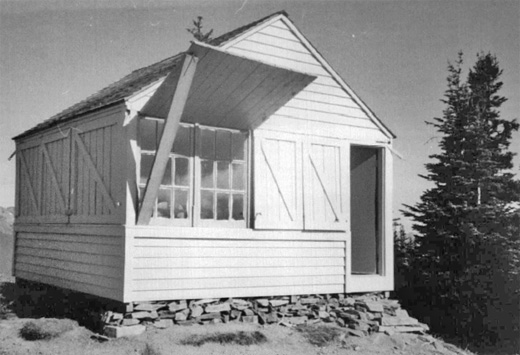

- Location within Washington (state)
- Location: Mile 13 of Dodger Point Trail, about 17.2 miles (27.7 km) south of Port Angeles, in Olympic National Park
- Nearest city: Port Angeles, Washington
- Coordinates: 47°52′27″N 123°30′36″W
- Area: less than one acre
- Built: 1933
- Architect: U.S. Forest Service
- Architectural style: Late 19th And 20th Century Revivals
- MPS: Olympic National Park MPS
- NRHP reference No.: 07000736
- Added to NRHP: July 13, 2007

The Dodger Point Fire Lookout was built in 1933 in Olympic National Park as a fire observation station. The single-story frame structure is located on the peak of Dodger Point above the timber line at an elevation of 5,753 feet (1,754 m). Measuring 14 feet (4.3 m) by 14 feet (4.3 m), it is clad in wood clapboards and has a simple pitched roof covered with wood shakes. Large windows on all four sides are covered by awning-style wood shutters. It was built by the U.S. Forest Service in what was at the time Olympic National Forest, possibly with assistance from the Civilian Conservation Corps. During World War II, the lookout was used as an Aircraft Warning Service station. Dodger Point and Pyramid Peak Lookout are the only such stations remaining in Olympic National Park out of thirteen constructed.

The Dodger Point Lookout was placed on the National Register of Historic Places on July 13, 2007.
