= Aircraft Warning Service Observation Tower =

- U.S. National Register of Historic Places
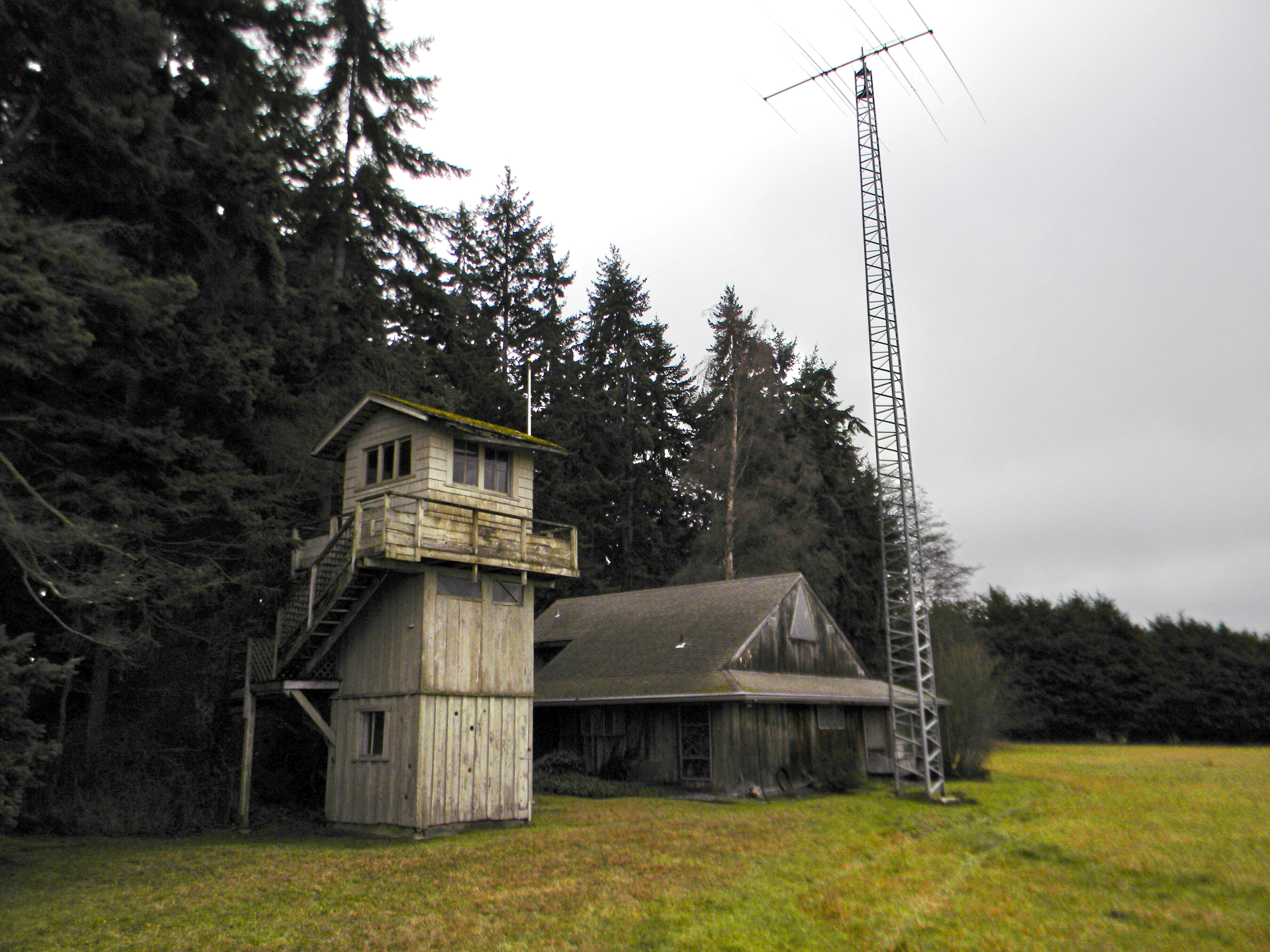

- Location within Washington (state)
- Location: 216 Spring Road, Agnew, Washington
- Coordinates: 48°06′08″N 123°15′01″W
- Area: less than one acre
- Built: 1941
- Built by: Fred and Jean Cook
- NRHP reference No.: 93000363
- Added to NRHP: April 29, 1993

The Aircraft Warning Service Observation Tower in Agnew, Washington was built in 1941 as a spotting station for Aircraft Warning Service volunteers watching for intruding Japanese airplanes during World War II. The tower's original site was near Dungeness, but in 1992 the tower was moved to its present location.

== History ==
The 35-foot (11 m) wood-frame tower was built from donated materials behind the Fred and Jean Cook farmhouse, overlooking the Strait of Juan de Fuca. Jean Cook, as "chief observer," organized a team of 300 people to maintain a 24-hour watch. The site reported to the Port Angeles "filter center," which compiled observer reports for transmission on to the U.S. Army. The AWS program operated from 1941 to October 1943. Most towers were dismantled or neglected after the war. The Cook tower is the only remaining such facility in Clallam County, Washington. Owing to liability concerns, the tower was partially dismantled and moved to the property of Harriet U. Fish, who had served at the Seattle filter center. It was re-erected and repaired.

The wood-frame tower's plan measures about 8 feet (2.4 m) by 8.5 feet (2.6 m), with three stories, each a single room accessed by an exterior door from the outside stairway. Windows are provided at each level, with larger windows on the top level, surrounded by a balcony. The lower levels are covered in board-and-batten siding, with wide clapboards on the top level. The roof is a pitched gable structure with deep eaves.

The tower was placed on the National Register of Historic Places on April 29, 1993.
