= Elwha River Bridge =

Elwha River Bridge (old)
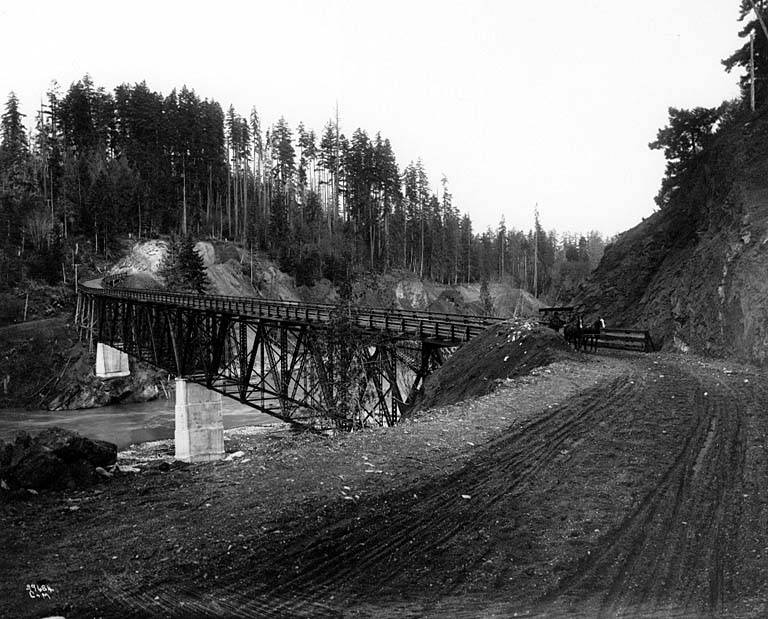
- Elwha River Bridge
- Coordinates: 48°06′50″N 123°33′14″W
- Carries: Elwha River Road
- Crosses: Elwha River
- Locale: Elwha, Washington
- Heritage status: NRHP (former)

Characteristics
- Design: Deck truss
- Material: Steel

History
- Construction end: 1913
- Closed: 2007
- Elwha River Bridge
- U.S. National Register of Historic Places
- Location within Washington (state) Location within the United States
- Location: Spans Elwha River on Elwha River Road, about 5.6 miles (9.0 km) west of Port Angeles
- Coordinates: 48°06′50″N 123°33′13″W
- Built: 1913
- Architect: Portland Bridge Company
- MPS: Historic Bridges/Tunnels in Washington State TR
- NRHP reference No.: 82004200
- Added to NRHP: July 16, 1982

Location
- Interactive map of Elwha River Bridge (old)

The Elwha River Bridge was built around 1913 to span the Elwha River, Washington. The bridge was closed and then demolished in late 2007 due to concerns regarding its structure after the I-35W Mississippi River bridge collapse. A new two lane bridge has been constructed with a pedestrian and bicyclist trail underneath. This is to become a vital link in the Olympic Discovery Trail. The bridge construction was completed in late 2009.

The bridge was added to the National Register of Historic Places in 1982. (Note: Note that map attached to NRHP form is showing the wrong bridge along modern SR-112, which was not existing in 1913. Check this 1959 map.)

Elwha River Bridge (new)
- Coordinates: 48°06′50″N 123°33′14″W
- Carries: Elwha River Road
- Crosses: Elwha River
- Locale: Elwha, Washington

Characteristics
- Design: Box girder
- Material: Concrete

History
- Construction end: 2009

Location
- Interactive map of Elwha River Bridge (new)
