= Hoko River Archeological Site =

- U.S. National Register of Historic Places
- Location: Address restricted, Clallam County, Washington, USA
- Nearest city: Pysht, Washington
- NRHP reference No.: 78002735
- Added to NRHP: March 21, 1978

The Hoko River Archeological Site complex, located in Clallam County in the northwestern part of the U.S. state of Washington, is a 2,500-year-old fishing camp. Hydraulic excavation methods, which were first developed on the site, and artifacts found there have contributed to the understanding of the traditions and culture of the Makah people who have inhabited the northwest for 3,800 years. The site has also shed light on the evolution of food storage and the flora and fauna that existed in the area around 2500 B.P. Its name comes from the Hoko River.

== Hoko River archeological excavation background ==
The Hoko River archeological site complex of Washington is located approximately 30 kilometers (19 mi) from the northwest tip of the Olympic Peninsula, along the Strait of Juan de Fuca. The Hoko River Site is often compared to the Ozette site 40 km (25 mi) to the west. While similar excavation techniques and general conditions are found in both sites, the Hoko River site is approximately 2,000 years older than the Ozette site.

The Hoko River site was initially unearthed in early 1935 when a flood eroded the topsoil, exposing various artifacts and the edges of a prehistoric campsite floor. However, the site remained unknown to archeologists until 1967, when the property manager notified Dr. Richard Daugherty and Harvey Rice of the site's existence. Consequently, archeologists Harvey Rice, Dr. Ronald Fryzell, Dr. Maynard Fosberg, Robert Johnson, Gerald Grosso, and Ruth Kirk conducted test excavations. Hoko River marked the first use of hydraulic excavation. Hydraulic excavation uses a jet of water to loosen soil, which is then removed by suction, which is useful when excavating underwater sites. This form of excavation is used infrequently as it is expensive and time-consuming.

The Hoko River site complex consists of three components. Two of the three sites date from the same period (3000–2000 B.P.), while the third was occupied more recently (1000–100 B.P.). The first two sites are an upriver, waterlogged site and an adjoining campsite area. These two sites are known as the wet and dry sites. The wet and dry archeological sites grant two different perspectives into the lives of the natives. Water preserved more artifacts and organic material at the wet site while the dry site offers evidence concerning the structure and layout of the fishing camp. The wet and dry sites were occupied between 3000 and 2500 B.P. The later site, occupied from 900 to 100 B.P. and known as the Rock Shelter, which is located at the mouth of the river.

== Sites ==
Excavation of the Hoko River Wet/Dry Sites began in 1973 and continues today. At the wet/dry site, researchers discovered twenty-five layers of well-preserved organic vegetal mats in the silt and sand deposits along the edge of the river. Through excavating and analyzing these layers, scientists have been able to draw conclusions about the people who lived here.

=== Wet site ===
Archaeologists have discovered a variety of artifacts from the wet site. Items including: basketry, cords, a variety of fishing hooks, a 3,000-year-old fishnet (which is constructed from split spruce boughs), tiny stone blades (with their original cedar handles still intact), wood working tools, anchor stones with binding, various hafted microliths (such as fish knives) and micro blades, carved wood art, a variety of wooden objects, animal bone, shellfish remains, and plant remains. The abundance of flatfish, roundfish, rockfish, and over 400 wooden offshore-fishing hooks found in the wet site suggest the presence of fisheries. The water at the wet site preserved artifacts that would have been lost under normal conditions. These items required particular care and were treated with an aqueous solution consisting of 50% white glue in order to keep them intact. Archeologists have also studied large vegetal mats at the wet site. Each layer in the mat represents 10 to 20 years elapsed. At least 45 of the layers found are from 3000 to 2600 B.P. These mats are also of interest as a means of analyzing the flora present at the time the site was inhabited.

=== Dry site ===
At the dry campsite, researchers study layers of earth and rock and compare them to the corresponding wet layers of organic material below the river high tide line. The dry deposits do not contain any preserved organic debris such as vegetal mats. Furthermore, artifacts at the dry site are more poorly preserved than those at the wet site, and only stone artifacts are present. The dry site contains campsite floors, slab-lined pits, deposits of charred and cracked rocks where fires would have burned, and locations where quartz were manufactured into microliths.

An analysis of the remains at the dry site has given researchers a basic understanding of the camp layout. The camps were probably occupied in the spring and summer. Pierced strips of cedar bark suggest that dwellings at the camp were roofed with longs sheets of cedar and sewn tule or bulrush mats which were also found during the excavation. The inhabitants would have slept on furs along the inner walls of the shed-like shelters. Other structures and remains were uncovered during excavation, such as evidence of canoe runs, drying racks and poles, which were likely used as platforms in order to move the canoes from the village onto the beach.

=== Rock shelter ===
- Hoko River Rockshelter Archeological Site
- U.S. National Register of Historic Places
- Location: Address restricted, Clallam County, Washington, US
- Nearest city: Sekiu, Washington
- NRHP reference No.: 80003997
- Added to NRHP: March 27, 1980

Excavation on the river-mouth Rock Shelter site began in 1980. It was determined that the site had been occupied by humans for roughly 900 years, beginning about 1,000 years ago. The interior of the rockshelter covers 1,300 square feet (120 m^{2}). The most significant discovery from the rock shelter is the 3.3 vertical meters of pristine shell midden. In excess of 1,300 distinct layers have been documented here. Upon analysis, these layers show elevated frequencies of fishbone, which have given archeologists insight into the food sources and dietary evolution of the natives that lived at the site. The site was also home to tens of thousands of remains sea mammals and birds.

== Fishing ==
The Hoko River community fished halibut and cod. Fish were dried in the sun on wooden drying racks. Hooks, floats, and cordage were also found along the river.

== Sources ==
- Croes, Dale R. (1976). The Excavation of Water-Saturated Archaeological Sites: An early wet site at the mouth of the Hoko River - The Hoko Site.
- Croes, Dale (1988). The Significance of the 3,000 BP Hoko River Waterlogged Fishing Camp in Our Overall Understanding of Southern Northwest Coast Cultural Evolution. Telford Press.
- Croes, Dale R.; Hackenberger, Steven (1988). Hoko River Archaeological Complex: Modeling Prehistoric Northwest Coast Economic Evolution, In Research in economic Anthropology, Supplement 3 pages 19-85. JAI Press Inc. pp. 19–85. ISBN 0-89232-818-5.
- Croes, Dale R.; Blinman, Eric (1982). American Antiquity: Hoko River: A 2500 Year Old Fishing Camp on the Northwest Coast of North America.
- Kirk, Ruth; Daugherty, Richard D. (2007). Archaeology in Washington. University of Washington Press. ISBN 0-295-98696-4..
