= Robert Botten =

Australian cricketer

Personal information
- Full name: Robert Dyas Botten
- Born: 11 October 1853; London, England
- Died: 26 April 1935 (aged 81); Medindie, South Australia
- Batting: Right-handed

Domestic team information
- Years: Team
- 1877/78: South Australia

Career statistics
Competition	First-class
Matches	1
Runs scored	17
Batting average	17.00
100s/50s	0/0
Top score	17
Catches/stumpings	1/–
- Source: Cricinfo, 18 May 2018

Robert Dyas Botten (11 October 1853 – 26 April 1935) was an Australian cricketer. He played one first-class match for South Australia during the 1877–88 season.
