= Pyramid Peak Aircraft Warning Service Lookout =

- U.S. National Register of Historic Places
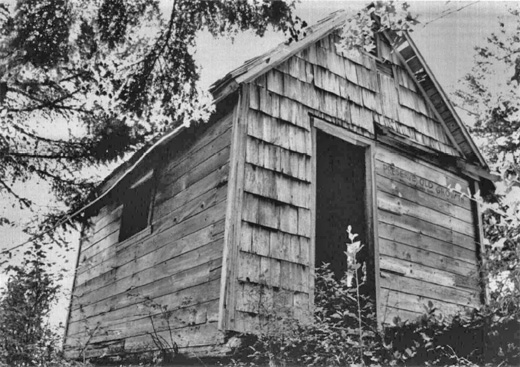

- Location within Washington (state)
- Location: End of Pyramid Peak Trail, about 17.6 miles (28.3 km) west of Port Angeles, Washington, in Olympic National Park
- Coordinates: 48°04′28″N 123°48′28″W
- Area: less than one acre
- Built: 1942
- Architect: U.S. Army
- Architectural style: Late 19th And Early 20th Century American Movements
- MPS: Olympic National Park MPS
- NRHP reference No.: 07000726
- Added to NRHP: July 13, 2007

The Pyramid Peak Aircraft Warning Service Lookout was built in the fall of 1942 in Olympic National Park to function as a spotter station guarding against intrusions by Japanese aircraft during World War II. The single-story frame structure is located on the southern side of Pyramid Peak. Funded by the U.S. Army, it was built by National Park Service employees Joe and Rena Shurnick as one of thirteen such sites within the present Olympic National Park. The 13-by-16-foot (4.0 by 4.9 m) shed is clad in wood shingles and has a simple pitched roof covered with wood shakes. A small woodshed is located just to the north. There are unglazed window openings on each side of the shelter. The lookout was used as an Aircraft Warning Service station until June 1944, when the AWS was abandoned. Pyramid Peak and Dodger Point Fire Lookout are the only such stations remaining in Olympic National Park.

The Pyramid Peak Lookout was placed on the National Register of Historic Places on July 13, 2007.
