= Joseph Paris House =

- U.S. National Register of Historic Places
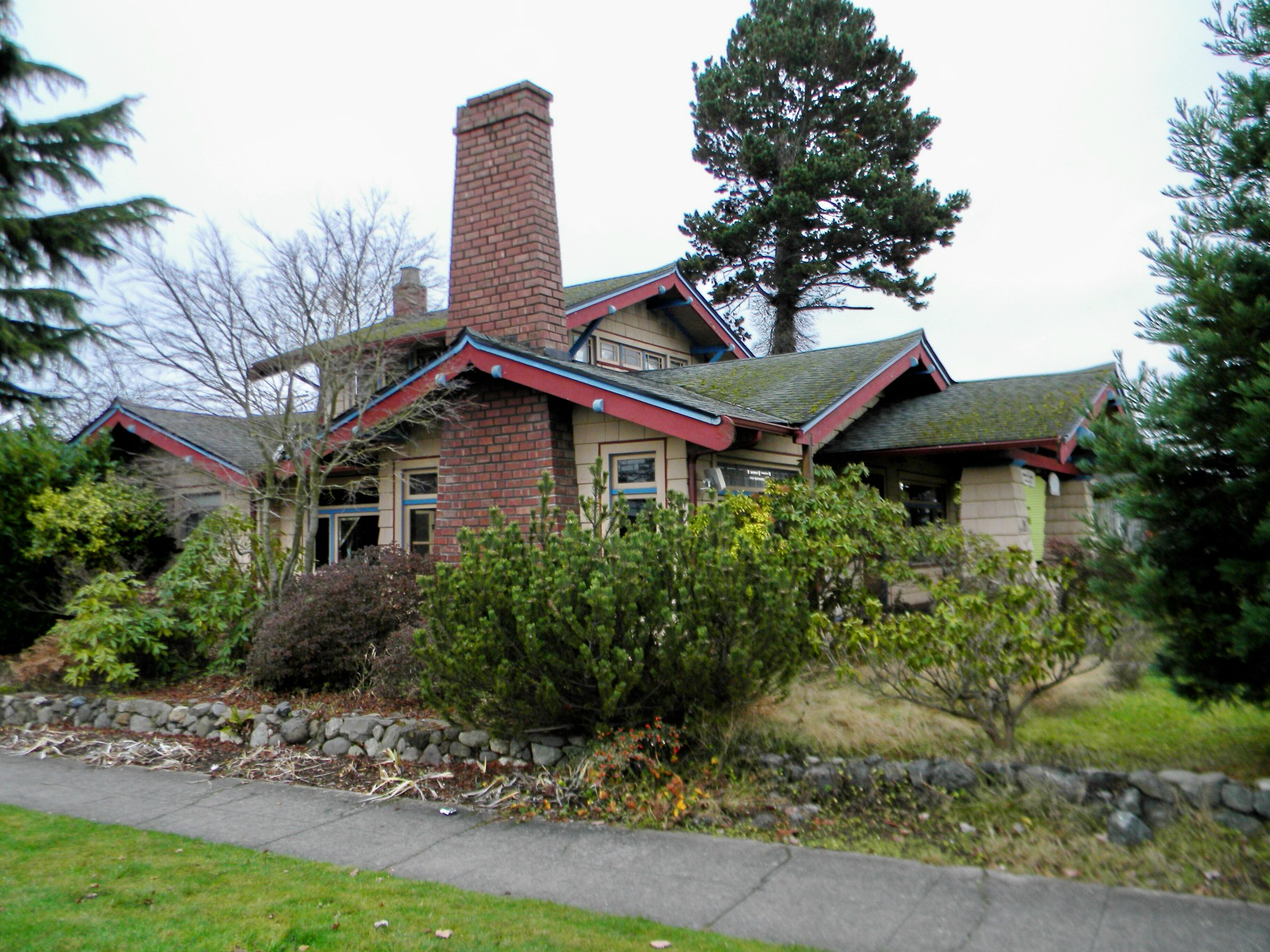
- Paris House in 2014

- Location within Washington (state) Location within the United States
- Location: 101 East 5th Street, Port Angeles, Washington
- Coordinates: 48°06′56″N 123°26′11″W
- Area: less than one acre
- Built: 1920
- Architectural style: Bungalow/Craftsman
- NRHP reference No.: 87001939
- Added to NRHP: November 5, 1987

The Joseph Paris House, also known as the Airplane House and the Peace House, is a historic wood frame bungalow built in 1920 and located at 101 East 5th Street in Port Angeles, Washington. Although being substantially a one-story building, an upper sleeping room rises from the center of the main roof, forming an airplane like configuration, whence the name of "Airplane House". The first owner of the house, Joseph Paris, was the owner of the Paris Motor Company in the city. Paris sold the house in 1923 to Petrus Pearson, General Manager of the Crescent Logging Company and the Port Angeles Western Railroad Company, who lived there until the 1940s. In 1975 the house was converted into a rental property, and became a center for local peace activists, whence the name of "Peace House".

The house was added to the National Register of Historic Places in 1987.
