= Blue Mountain School =

- U.S. National Register of Historic Places
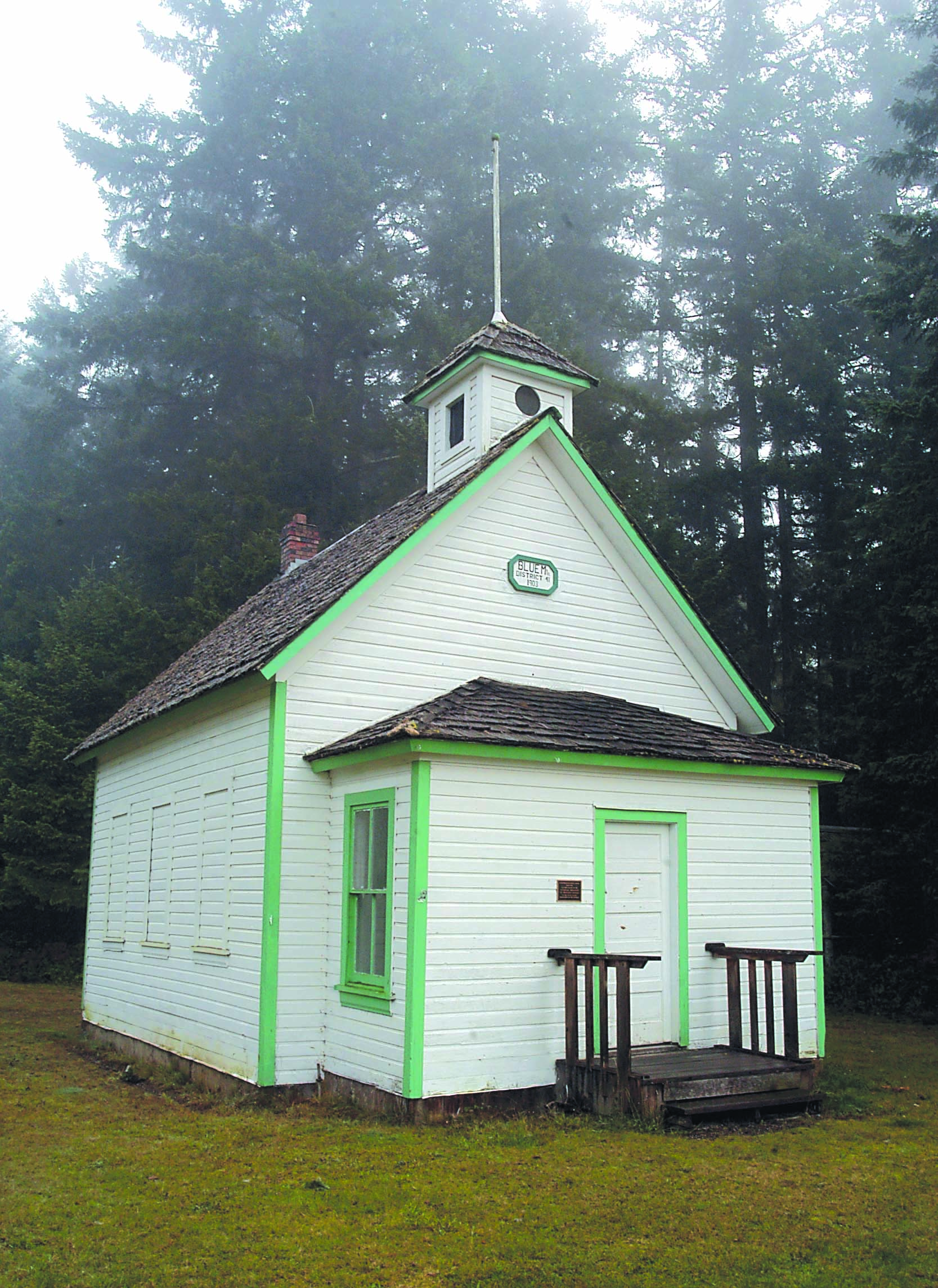
- Blue Mountain School

- Location within Washington (state)
- Location: 1986 Blue Mountain Road, about 8.7 miles (14.0 km) southeast of Port Angeles
- Coordinates: 48°03′01″N 123°16′29″W
- Area: 5 acres (2.0 ha)
- Built: 1903
- MPS: Rural Public Schools of Washington State MPS
- NRHP reference No.: 87001938
- Added to NRHP: November 5, 1987

Blue Mountain School is an historic school located at 1986 Blue Mountain Road, on a five acre lot about 8.7 miles (14.0 km) southeast of Port Angeles, Washington. It was moved slightly east of its original location and its brick chimney was reconstructed in the early 20th century. The school operated from 1903 to the date of its closure in 1935 as the only educational facility in the Blue Mountain district, with space for 19 students and one teacher. In 1935, the school was closed in 1935 when the district was consolidated with others in the region to form the Port Angeles School District.

In addition to operating as a ungraded common school, the building was the headquarters of the Blue Mountain Cemetery Association, where community members would assist with maintenance of the building in exchange for a lot in the attached 2.5 acre cemetery. After closure, the Blue Mountain Cemetery Association continued to maintain and preserve the property, and the school operated as a meeting place for several community groups.

Blue Mountain School was added to the National Historic Register in 1987.
