= Elwha Campground Community Kitchen =

- U.S. National Register of Historic Places
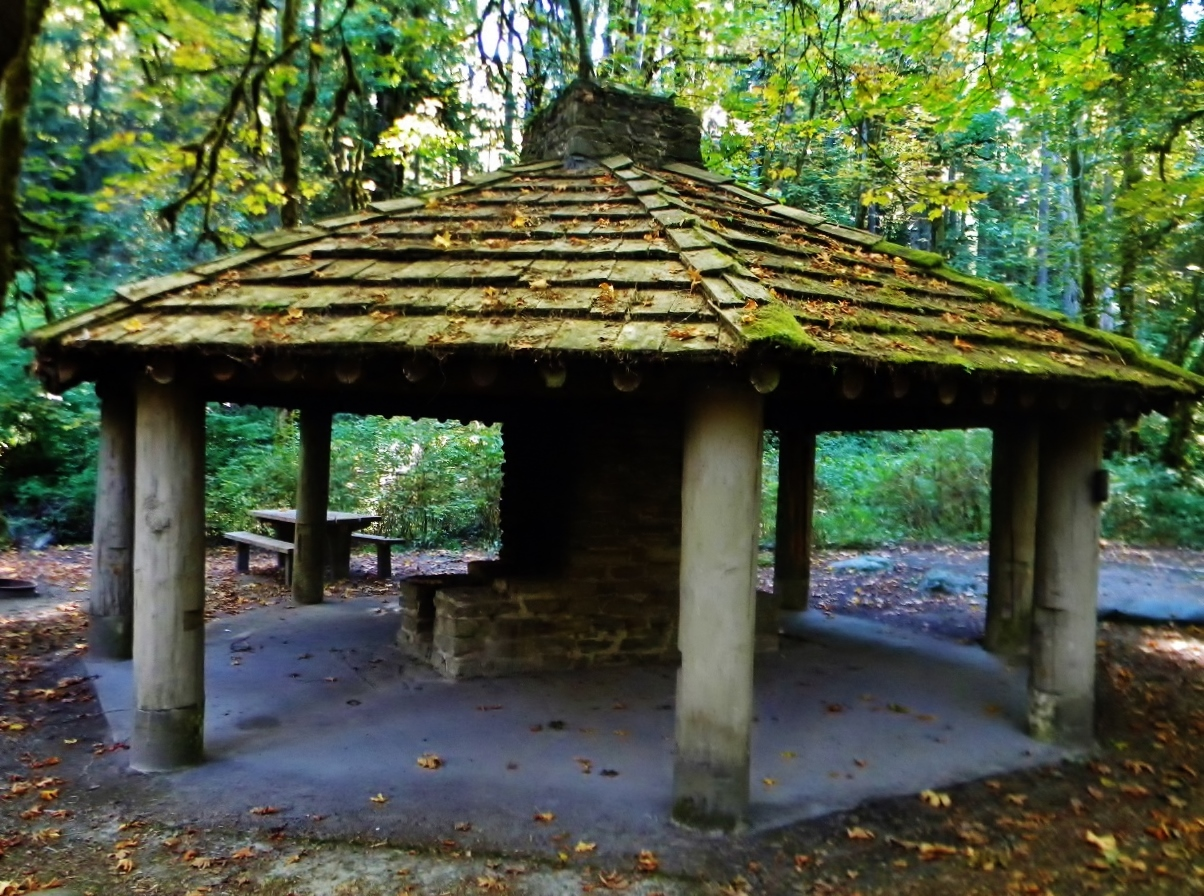

- Location within Washington (state)
- Location: Along Elwha River, about 2.3 miles (3.7 km) south of Elwha, in Olympic National Park
- Coordinates: 48°01′40″N 123°35′17″W
- Area: less than one acre
- Built: 1935
- Architect: Civilian Conservation Corps
- Architectural style: Rustic
- MPS: Olympic National Park MPS
- NRHP reference No.: 07000735
- Added to NRHP: July 13, 2007

The Elwha Campground Community Kitchen was built in Olympic National Park to serve the Altair Campground. It is an open octagonal shelter built in 1935 by the Civilian Conservation Corps personnel from the Elwha River Camp in the National Park Service Rustic style. The peeled log structure is capped with a cedar shake roof, enclosing a cooking fireplace and chimney. The Elwha and Altair Campground Community Kitchens are the only such structures remaining in Olympic National Park.

The Elwha Ranger Station and the Altair Campground Community Kitchen are located nearby on the banks of the Elwha. The lower portions of the log posts have deteriorated and have been replaced with concrete piers.

The kitchen structure was listed on National Register of Historic Places on July 13, 2007.

By 2014 the Elwha Dam and all other dams along the Elwha River were removed. When the river flooded in November 2015, both Altair and Elwha Campgrounds were severely damaged by water. National Park Service has no plans to restore the two campgrounds. The actual state of buildings in the two areas is not clear.

== See also ==
- Elwha Ranger Station nearby
