= McAlmond House =

Historic house in Washington, United States

- U.S. National Register of Historic Places
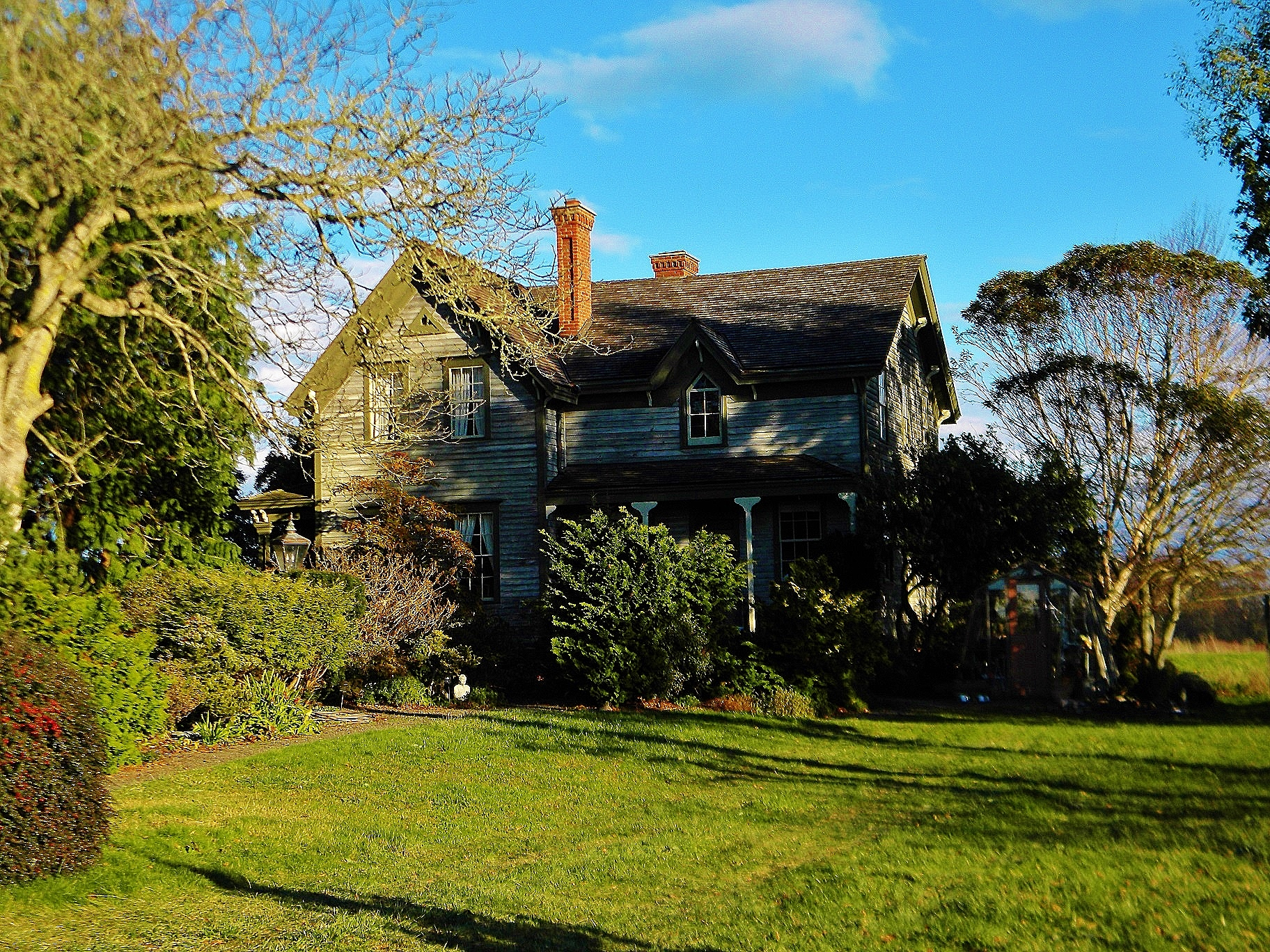

- Location within Washington (state)
- Location: 242 Twin View Drive, Sequim, Washington
- Coordinates: 48°08′48″N 123°08′07″W
- Area: less than one acre
- Built: 1862
- Architectural style: Gothic Revival
- NRHP reference No.: 76001879
- Added to NRHP: August 09, 1976

McAlmond House is a Gothic Revival farmhouse that built in 1862. The house stands on the bluffs of Dungeness near Sequim, Clallam County, Washington. The house is the only remain of the New Dungeness settlement, founded by New England sailors in the 1850s, and was built by ship's carpenters for the Captain Elijah H. McAlmond, which served as Justice of the Peace, first county commissioner, sheriff, Deputy United States Marshall, Probate Judge and, in 1863, as a member of the Territorial Legislature. The home remained in the McAlmond family until the mid-1900s, when the last remaining property was put up for sale.

Local legends claim that under Capt. McAlmond's stewardship, the bluffs under the house were used to smuggle Chinese into the United States.

The house was added to the National Register of Historic Places in 1976.
