= Altair Campground Community Kitchen =

- U.S. National Register of Historic Places
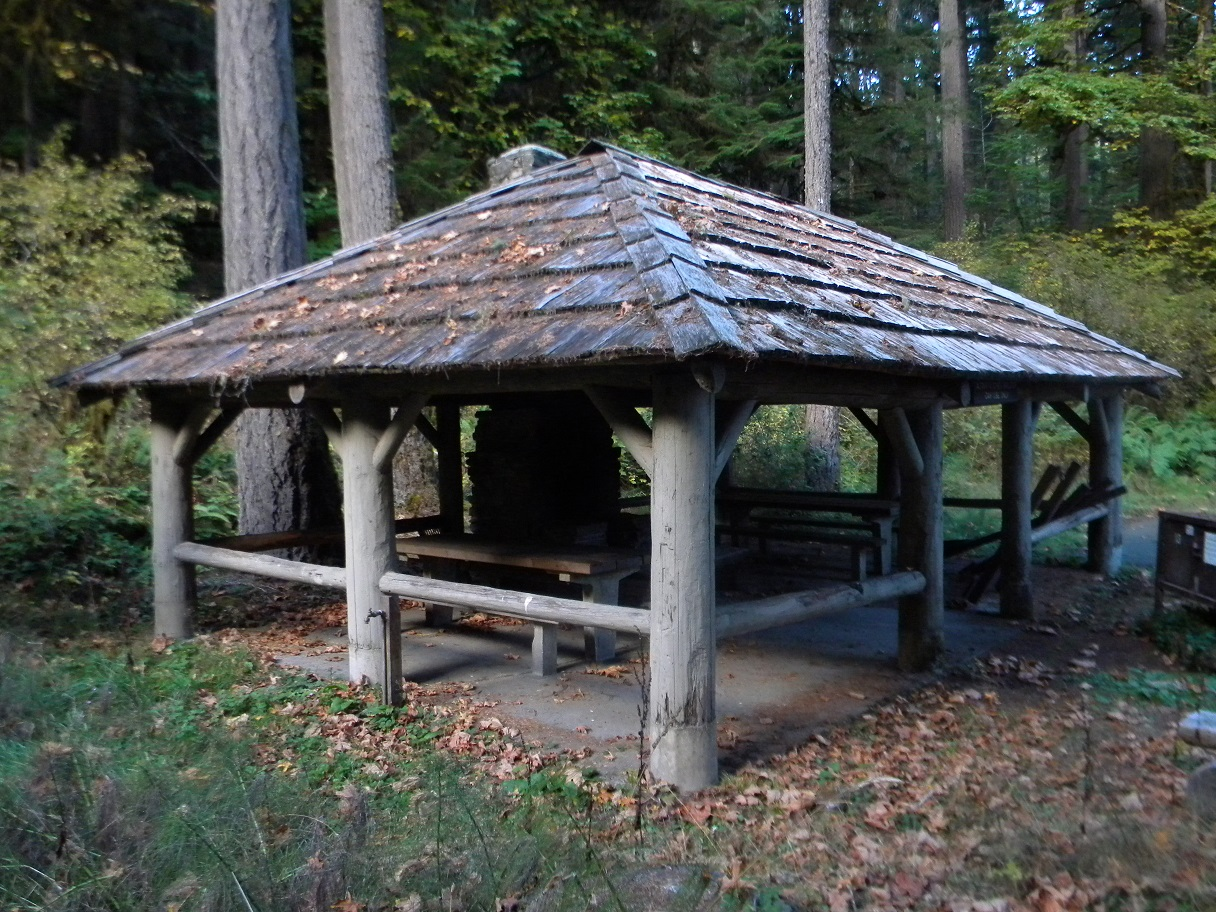
- Altair Campground Community Kitchen in October 2015

- Location within Washington (state)
- Location: Along Elwha River, about 3.4 miles (5.5 km) south of Elwha, in Olympic National Park
- Coordinates: 48°00′41″N 123°35′34″W
- Area: less than one acre
- Built: 1935
- Architect: Civilian Conservation Corps
- Architectural style: Rustic
- MPS: Olympic National Park MPS
- NRHP reference No.: 07000732
- Added to NRHP: July 13, 2007

The Altair Campground Community Kitchen, also known as Altaire Campground Community Kitchen, was built in Olympic National Park, Washington, United States, to serve the Altair Campground. It is an open rectangular shelter built in 1935 by the Civilian Conservation Corps personnel from the Elwha River Camp in the National Park Service Rustic style.

Located near the Elwha River, the peeled log structure is capped with a cedar shake roof, enclosing a cooking fireplace and chimney. It measures about 28 feet (8.5 m) by 17 feet (5.2 m), with a stone cooking fireplace in the middle, rising through the roof. The lower portions of the log columns have been replaced with concrete piers due to deterioration, and the original peeled log railings have disappeared.

The Altair and Elwha Campground Community Kitchens are the only such structures remaining in Olympic National Park. The Altair campground was named after the USS Altair, whose crew regularly used the site in the 1920s and 1930s. The kitchen structure was listed on National Register of Historic Places on July 13, 2007.

By 2014 the Elwha Dam and all other dams along the Elwha River were removed. When the river flooded in November 2015, both Altair and Elwha Campgrounds were severely damaged by water. National Park Service has no plans to restore the two campgrounds.

As of May 2023, rangers at Olympic National Park confirmed the Altair Kitchen was under about 9 feet of sediment, and the Elwha Kitchen is completely covered in sediment from the Elwha River.

== See also ==
- Elwha Ranger Station nearby
