= Elkhorn Guard Station =

- U.S. National Register of Historic Places
- U.S. Historic district
- Location within Washington (state) Location within the United States
- Location: Along Elwha River Trail, about 14.3 miles (23.0 km) south of Elwha, in Olympic National Forest
- Coordinates: 47°52′23″N 123°28′10″W
- Area: 4 acres (1.6 ha)
- Built by: U.S. Forest Service; Civilian Conservation Corps
- Architectural style: Rustic
- MPS: Olympic National Park MPS
- NRHP reference No.: 07000714
- Added to NRHP: July 13, 2007

The Elkhorn Guard Station, also known as the Elkhorn Ranger Station, comprises four buildings in the backcountry of Olympic National Park, Washington. The station was built by the U.S. Forest Service between 1930 and 1934, before the establishment of the national park, when the lands were part of Olympic National Forest (USFS). The structures were designed in the Forest Service's interpretation of the National Park Service rustic style, using native materials and construction techniques. The complex was built using labor from the Public Works Administration and the Civilian Conservation Corps. The Elkhorn Guard Station is one of five surviving USFS-built guard stations.

The chief structure is the residence, built in 1933 to replace a smaller cabin that had previously served as the guard station. The 12-foot (3.7 m) by 16-foot (4.9 m) cabin is built of peeled logs on a stone foundation with a gable roof. One end of the roof overhangs at the gable to form a porch supported by log posts. A shed roof on the opposite elevation shelters the front door. An woodshed was built nearby in 1934, of frame construction. A barn was built in 1933 by Civilian Conservation Corps laborers, 20 feet (6.1 m) by 20 feet (6.1 m) in size with four stalls, a manger and a hay rack. The log barn was relocated in 1996 due to changes in the course of the nearby Elwha River. An open-fronted shelter was constructed in the early 1930s, one of six built at the time, and the only survivor. The 14-foot (4.3 m) square shelter is saltbox-shaped with a wood floor and built-in bunk beds. The shelter was relocated at the same time as the barn.

The Elkhorn Guard Station was listed on the National Register of Historic Places on July 13, 2007.
