= Botten Cabin =

- U.S. National Register of Historic Places
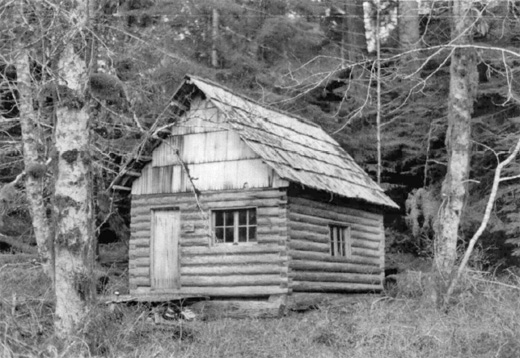

- Location within Washington (state) Location within the United States
- Nearest city: Port Angeles, Washington
- Coordinates: 47°45′50″N 123°27′16″W
- Area: less than one acre
- Built by: Humes, Grant
- MPS: Olympic National Park MPS
- NRHP reference No.: 07000729
- Added to NRHP: July 13, 2007

The Botten Cabin, also known as the Wilder Patrol Cabin, was built in 1929 in the Elwha River valley for Henry H. Botten. The hunting cabin is located in the backcountry of what in 1938 became Olympic National Park in the U.S. state of Washington. The remote cabin was built by local settler Grant Humes for Botten, who used it until his death in 1953. Botten's widow continued to apply for special use permits into the 1960s. More recently, the National Park Service has used the cabin as a backcountry patrol cabin. The cabin is one of only two former private hunting camps left in Olympic National Park.

The cabin is constructed of logs with unusually fine dovetail-notched corners. The one-story cabin measures 11 feet (3.4 m) by 17 feet (5.2 m) and rests on a dry-laid rubblestone foundation. The gabled roof extends to create a porch at one end, with wood shakes on the gable, with a wood shingle roof. A porch once extended across the long side of the house with a shed roof, but was damaged by a falling tree and removed. The cabin retains some of its original furnishings.

The Botten Cabin was placed on the National Register of Historic Places on July 13, 2007.
