= Olympic National Park Headquarters Historic District =

Historic district in Washington, United States

- U.S. National Register of Historic Places
- U.S. Historic district
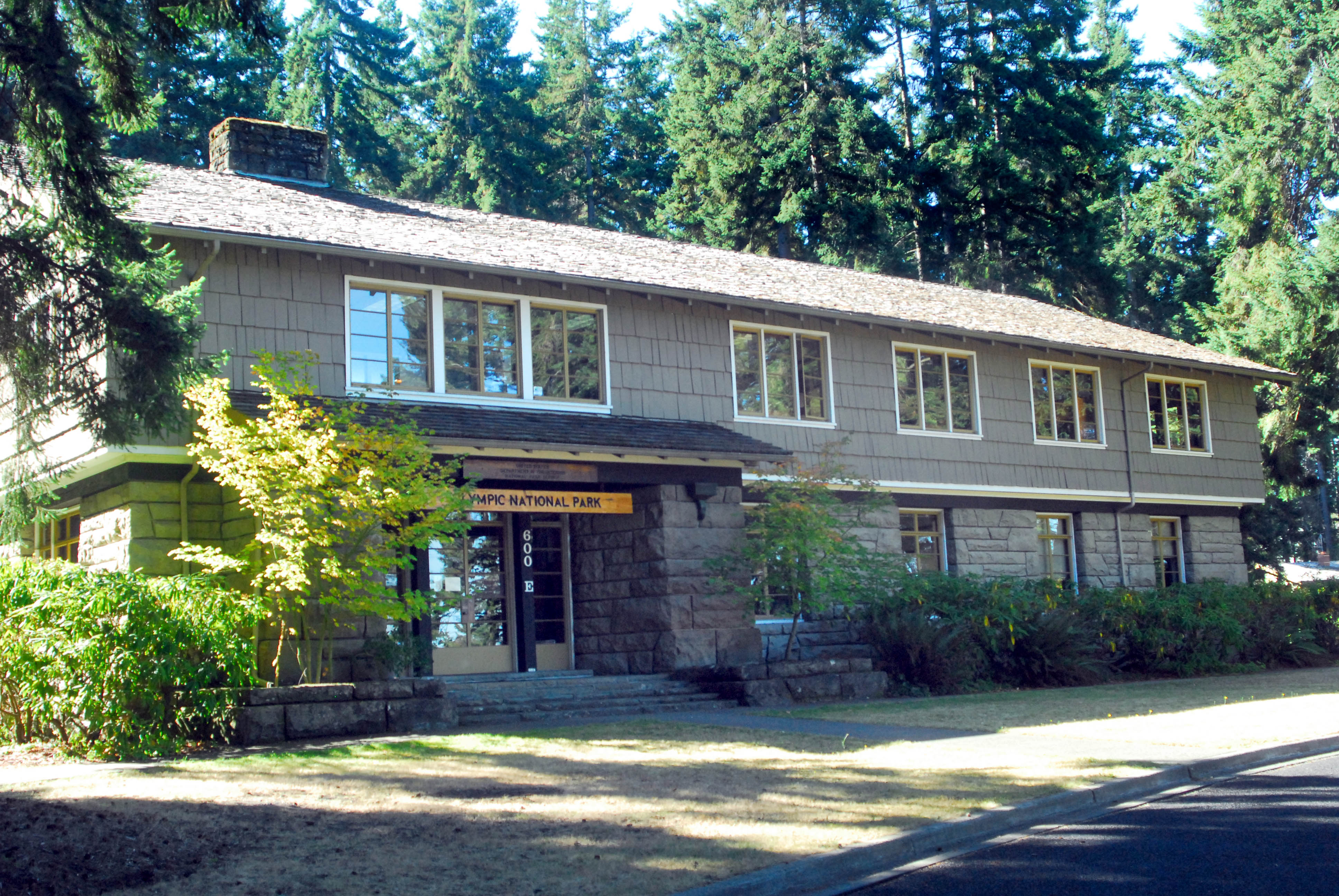
- Olympic National Park Headquarters

- Location within Washington (state) Location within the United States
- Location: 600 East Park Avenue, Port Angeles, Washington
- Coordinates: 48°05′59″N 123°25′57″W
- Area: 38 acres (15 ha)
- Built: 1940
- Architect: National Park Service
- Architectural style: Rustic
- MPS: Olympic National Park MPS
- NRHP reference No.: 07000720
- Added to NRHP: July 13, 2007

The Olympic National Park Headquarters Historic District overlooks Port Angeles, Washington from Peabody Heights, consisting of 6 contributing buildings built in 1940–44, 8 contributing structures and 17 non-contributing properties that act as the administrative headquarters for Olympic National Park. The contributing structures were built using locally obtained native materials in a late interpretation of the National Park Service Rustic style. Native landscaping enhances the site. Much of the work was carried out by Public Works Administration and Civilian Conservation Corps workers.

The most significant building is the Administration Building (48°06′03″N 123°25′58″W), a two-story masonry and wood-frame structure with a long, horizontal design, emphasized by linear banding in the shingle cladding of the second story. The Custodian's Residence or Superintendent's Residence (48°06′03″N 123°25′53″W) housed the park superintendent until the 1980s when it was converted to offices. The irregularly shaped two-story building is similar in style and materials to the headquarters.

A somewhat separated area comprises several maintenance buildings. The Gas and Oil House building (48°05′59″N 123°25′53″W) uses coursed stone and heavy timber, with a porte-cochere extending from the front to shelter gas pumps. The Transformer Vault and Pump House (48°05′59″N 123°25′59″W) is similar in character. The Equipment Shed/Carpenter Shop (48°05′58″N 123°25′55″W) is a stone and frame building in a saltbox shape with projecting bracketed eaves that anticipate the Mission 66 style structures on the 1950s and 1960s. The Equipment and Supply Building (48°05′57″N 123°25′54″W), measuring 199 feet (61 m) by 32 feet (9.8 m) is a masonry and frame building, with a large frame extension that burned in 1965. This section was replaced with a historically faithful copy in 1970.

The Headquarters District is close to the park, but outside its primary boundaries. It was the first park headquarters to be situated outside its park. The district was placed on the National Register of Historic Places in 2007.
