= Agnew, Washington =

Unincorporated community in Washington, United States

- Unincorporated community
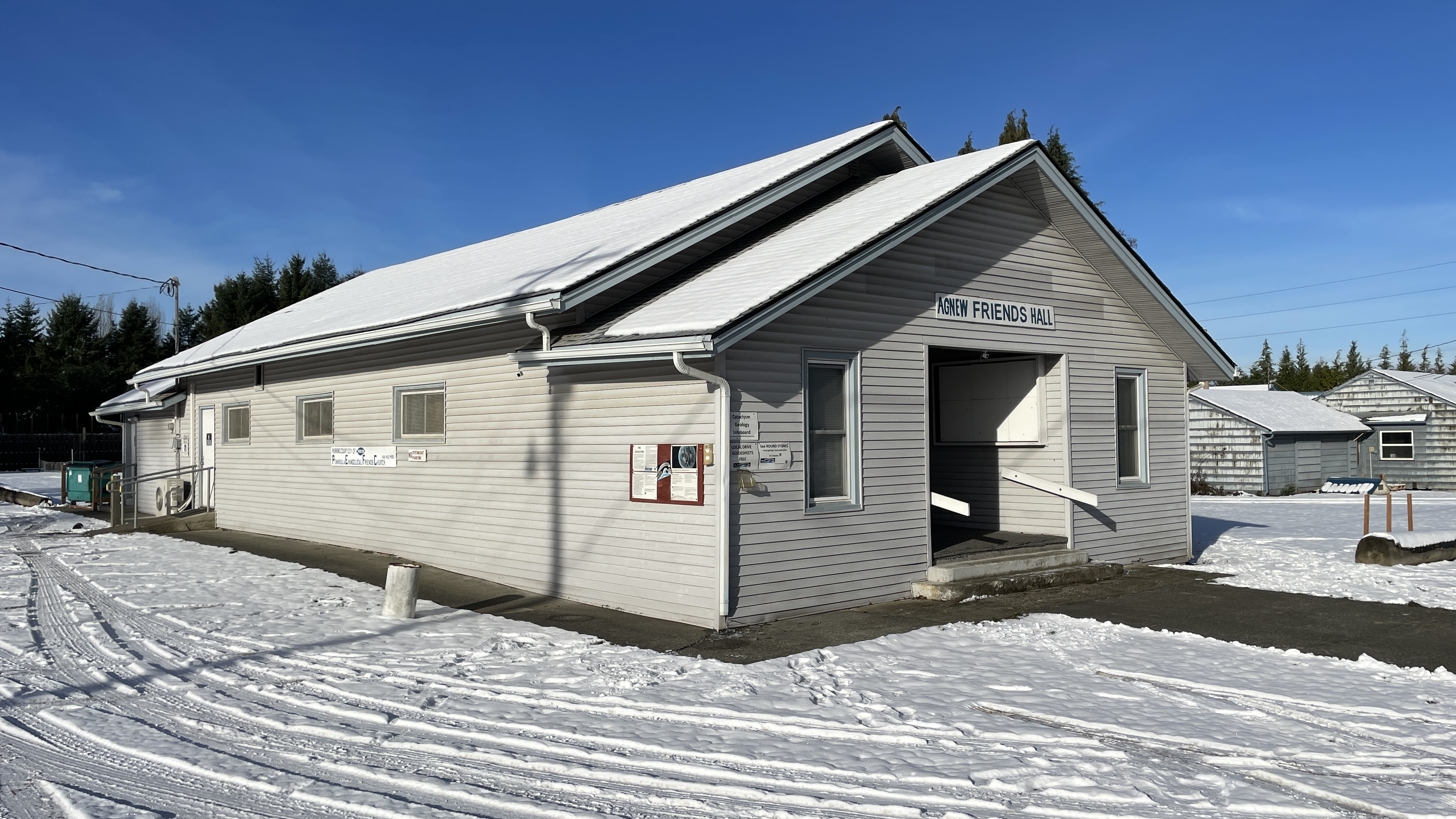
- Peninsula Evangelical Friends Church

- Location within the state of Washington
- Coordinates: 48°06′20″N 123°14′55″W
- Country: United States
- State: Washington
- County: Clallam
- Settled: approx. 1875
- Elevation: 164 ft (50 m)
- Time zone: UTC-8 (Pacific (PST))
  - Summer (DST): UTC-7 (PDT)
- GNIS feature ID: 1515753

Agnew is an unincorporated community in Clallam County, Washington, United States. It lies on a backroad leading to Port Angeles and just outside Sequim. Agnew is a primarily rural residential area located along the Strait of Juan de Fuca.

Agnew was first settled around 1875 by Charles Agnew. Previously called "De Fuca" and "Wildcat Valley", it received its present name in 1920. It is a consolidation of the former towns of Reeveton and Lindsay.

== Climate ==
This region experiences warm (but not hot) and dry summers, with no average monthly temperatures above 71.6 °F. According to the Köppen Climate Classification system, Agnew has a warm-summer Mediterranean climate, abbreviated "Csb" on climate maps.

Climate data for Agnew, Washington
Month	Jan	Feb	Mar	Apr	May	Jun	Jul	Aug	Sep	Oct	Nov	Dec	Year
Mean daily maximum °F (°C)	45.9 (7.7)	47.3 (8.5)	50.5 (10.3)	54.9 (12.7)	60.4 (15.8)	64.0 (17.8)	68.2 (20.1)	68.7 (20.4)	65.5 (18.6)	57.2 (14.0)	50.2 (10.1)	45.7 (7.6)	56.5 (13.6)
Daily mean °F (°C)	40.6 (4.8)	41.2 (5.1)	43.7 (6.5)	47.5 (8.6)	52.7 (11.5)	56.7 (13.7)	60.1 (15.6)	60.4 (15.8)	57.0 (13.9)	50.2 (10.1)	44.1 (6.7)	40.5 (4.7)	49.6 (9.8)
Mean daily minimum °F (°C)	35.2 (1.8)	35.2 (1.8)	36.9 (2.7)	40.1 (4.5)	45.0 (7.2)	49.1 (9.5)	52.0 (11.1)	52.0 (11.1)	48.7 (9.3)	43.0 (6.1)	37.9 (3.3)	35.1 (1.7)	42.5 (5.8)
Average precipitation inches (mm)	2.96 (75.11)	1.93 (49.02)	1.94 (49.26)	1.40 (35.44)	1.19 (30.19)	0.98 (24.83)	0.50 (12.82)	0.62 (15.77)	1.07 (27.20)	2.01 (51.02)	3.59 (91.22)	3.32 (84.43)	21.51 (546.31)
Average snowfall inches (cm)	1.8 (4.6)	0.9 (2.3)	0.4 (1)	0 (0)	0 (0)	0 (0)	0 (0)	0 (0)	0 (0)	0 (0)	0.3 (0.8)	0.8 (2)	4.2 (10.7)
Average precipitation days	17	14	14	11	9	8	5	6	8	13	17	18	140
Average dew point °F (°C)	36.3 (2.4)	35.8 (2.1)	37.6 (3.1)	40.6 (4.8)	45.3 (7.4)	49.3 (9.6)	52.5 (11.4)	53.2 (11.8)	50.9 (10.5)	45.3 (7.4)	39.6 (4.2)	36.1 (2.3)	43.5 (6.4)
Mean daily daylight hours	9.5	10.8	12.5	14.3	15.9	16.7	16.2	14.8	13	11.3	9.8	9	12.8
Source 1: PRISM Climate Group
Source 2: Weatherbase(snowfall-length of day-precipitation days)
