= Elwha Ranger Station =

- U.S. National Register of Historic Places
- U.S. Historic district
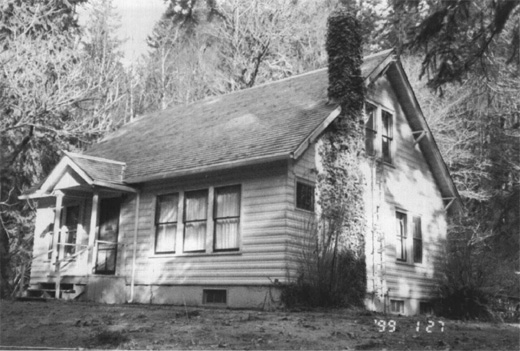

- Location within Washington (state)
- Location: Along Elwha River, about 3 miles (4.8 km) south of Elwha, in Olympic National Park
- Coordinates: 48°00′59″N 123°35′26″W
- Area: 9 acres (3.6 ha)
- Architect: U.S. Forest Service
- Architectural style: Bungalow/Craftsman
- MPS: Olympic National Park MPS
- NRHP reference No.: 07000716
- Added to NRHP: July 13, 2007

The Elwha Ranger Station is a historic district in Olympic National Park, originally built in the 1930s for the U.S. Forest Service. The complex of fourteen buildings is divided in two by Olympic Hotsprings Road. To the east lie the ranger station and three residences, with nine maintenance buildings on the west side of the road. The complex was turned over to the National Park Service in 1940 when the land was added to Olympic National Park from Olympic National Forest. Construction is typical of USFS practice, and reflects the Forest Service's preference of the time for bungalow and American Craftsman style architecture.

The Elwha area was designated as one of fifteen areas in Olympic National Forest to be used for public recreation. The "Cleator Plan," named after Forest Service recreation engineer Fred W. Cleator, envisioned the construction of appropriate structures to support these activities, including a ranger station. In the mid-1930s a Civilian Conservation Corps camp was established nearby, contributing labor for forest construction projects. When the area was taken over by the National Park Service in 1940 the complex continued in use virtually unchanged, retaining its Forest Service character.

== Buildings ==
The historic district comprises 13 contributing buildings, built between 1930 and 1936.

The Elwha Ranger Station Office (48°01′00″N 123°35′24″W) was built in 1932. The one-story wood-frame structure is covered with half-log siding on the lower walls in two widths and shingles on the gables. The building is irregular in shape, with porches on the south and west sides, supported by log columns. The Ranger Station Residence (48°01′02″N 123°35′24″W) was also built in 1932. The 1 1/2-story frame structure is similar in construction and materials, located a little distance away from the office. The Mechanic's House (48°00′59″N 123°35′21″W) had previously been built in 1930. This 1 1/2-story building is similar to the others. A matching woodshed is nearby (48°01′00″N 123°35′20″W). The Bunkhouse (48°00′59″N 123°35′22″W) was built in 1932, measuring 22 feet (6.7 m) by 30 metres (98 ft). The 1 1/2-story structure is of similar construction to the others, with its own woodshed (48°00′58″N 123°35′22″W).

The maintenance area across the road includes the 1930 fire cache building (48°01′00″N 123°35′27″W), equipment shed (48°01′00″N 123°35′29″W), equipment repair shop (48°00′59″N 123°35′29″W) and horse barn (48°01′01″N 123°35′28″W), all of wood-frame construction. The two-story barn is covered with board-and-batten siding and has a distinctive Forest Service character. 1936 buildings include the gas and oil building (48°00′59″N 123°35′27″W), constructed by the Civilian Conservation Corps, an equipment shed (48°00′58″N 123°35′29″W) that was moved in 1948 from the Elwha CCC camp, and a smaller lean-to shed (48°00′59″N 123°35′30″W). The oil and grease building has a residential character, with stylized pine tree cut-outs in the gables and curved support brackets on the front porch. The equipment sheds are large gabled 1 1/2-story buildings with exposed rafter tails and prominent gable dormers.

The Elwha Ranger Station complex was placed on the National Register of Historic Places on July 13, 1997. The district is located between the NRHP-listed Elwha and Altair community kitchens.
