= Aircraft Warning Service =

US Army civilian service tasked with keeping watch for enemy planes during WW2

The Aircraft Warning Service (AWS) was a civilian service of the United States Army Ground Observer Corps established during World War II to keep watch for enemy planes entering American airspace. It was deactivated on May 29, 1944.

== Purpose ==
During World War I, the airplane was not originally used as a long-range fighting machine. However, during the war the heavy bomber was created with the Zeppelin Staaken R. VI of the German Air Force as a prime example. During the interwar years, planes gained range and payload size as was shown by the Boeing 299 predecessor of the B-17 and the navy's Curtis NC series of flying boats. It soon became clear that a warning system was needed to protect against this new threat. Technology at the outset of World War II consisted of a handful of radar stations and mechanical sound detectors that were found to be inadequate to the job. It was also argued that while soldier lookouts would be valuable, their use would detract from other needed military operations.

== Creation ==
With the help of the American Legion, volunteers were organized in May 1941 into the Aircraft Warning Service, the civilian arm of the Army's Ground Observer Corps. On the east coast, the AWS was under the command of the Army Air Force's 1st Interceptor Command (later First Fighter Command or I Fighter Command) based at Mitchel Field, New York. On the west coast, the AWS was under the command of the 4th Interceptor Command (later Fourth Fighter Command or IV Fighter Command) based in Riverside, California. On both coasts, observation posts, information centers and filter centers were established. The United States entered World War II on Dec 7, 1941. Many of those who could not join the military for whatever reason were recruited to the AWS. Statistically, this led to a preponderance of women.

== Training ==
All observers received training in aircraft recognition. This training spilled over into the non-AWS population. Aircraft recognition became a hobby and many books and publications resulted on the subject. Many participated in contests and recognition "Bees". Recognition clubs and meetings were set up. Black, hard rubber, spotter models were made for various aircraft.

As the war escalated, thousands of observation posts were established on the east coast from the top of Maine to the tip of Florida, and roughly inland as far as the western slopes of the Appalachian Mountains. On the west coast, posts ranged from upper Washington to lower California. The Forest Service also played a part on the west coast, as many fire spotter towers were converted into AWS towers. Each post had its own code name and number. When aircraft were spotted, the volunteers recorded their observations on forms or in log books and then quickly place a call to a regional Army Filter Center and verbally deliver a "Flash Message" which contained the organized data from the observation. In California these messages were a series of brief phrases describing the number of planes, estimated altitude, heading direction, and number of engines: e.g., "one, high, south east, four" <personal observation>. One can imagine that aircraft approaching the coast would be spotted by multiple posts, resulting in multiple Flash Messages and, therefore, a reasonably accurate triangulation of position, speed, direction, altitude, etc.

The training and intense watching bore fruit in the autumn of 1943 when observers at a post in West Palm Beach, Florida, saw and reported instantly the passage of a German Junkers JU-88 bearing American markings over their post. The fact that the plane was one that had been captured in Europe and was being flown back to the United States for examination detracted not one bit from the effectiveness of the recognition instruction.

At the peak of operation, the Aircraft Warning Service of the First Fighter Command numbered some 750,000 people, of whom about 12,000 were in information and filter centers. Practice interceptions, run almost daily, provided experience for ground officers and pilots working under simulated combat conditions. Because of its huge scope of operations, the AWS saved the lives of many pilots by bringing speedy aid to those whose planes had crashed.

A detailed account of life in an east coast observation post is offered by Meade Minnigerode in his book, Essex Post, published in 1944 by the Yale University Press.

== Information and Filter Centers ==
To process the data from the observation posts, Information and Filter Centers were established in strategic, but secret, locations on both coasts. The Army called on Adelaide Rickenbacker, wife of Capt. Eddie Rickenbacker, to assist in recruiting for the centers. The bulk of the center personnel were women drawn from the ranks of housewives, office workers, actresses, entertainers, and executives.

Center personnel represented the information from the flash messages designations on markers placed on large regional plotting maps in windowless rooms. From balconies overlooking these maps, officers of the Army, including the Army Air Force, and Navy watched the flights moving across the boards. To plot these flights, to staff the battery of telephones and to transmit information from filter rooms to operation rooms and from one filter center to another, volunteers worked 24 hours a day.

== Merit awards ==
In the summer of 1943, a system of awards for services performed and accomplishments was established. There were awards ceremonies for those who "earned their wings" and Merit Awards for those who contributed thousands of hours. In addition to wings and merit awards, there were printed certificates of award and appreciation. Normal insignia included arm bands for Observers and Chief Observers and the rare AWC patch for filter center workers.

== Media ==
On the east coast, to coordinate the interest of the volunteers and to provide a medium for important news and training information, the "Observation Post," a semi-monthly publication of the Ground Observer Corps, was started in March 1942. This four page black and white newsletter gave way to a full-fledged monthly magazine, Aircraft Warning Volunteer, in June 1943. The original editor was Capt. Frederick W. Pederson. The last publication was a commemorative issue in June 1944. On the west coast, the National Broadcasting Company hosted a 30-minute weekly radio broadcast, Eyes, Aloft!, that provided similar AWS information over the air from August 17, 1942, to November 10, 1943, some 61 episodes. A principal actor was Henry Fonda.

== Disbandment ==
On March 31, 1944, the IV Fighter Command was disbanded. On May 16, 1944, Henry L. Stimson, Secretary of War, wrote in a letter announcing the coming inactivation of the GOC, AWC and AWS, "This does not mean that the War Department is of the opinion that all danger of enemy bombing has passed. On the contrary, a small-scale sneak raid is still within the capabilities of our enemies. We must win this war in Europe and Asia, however, and the calculated risk we are assuming in reducing our air defense measures is justified by the offensive power we will thereby release." With no fighters to scramble, no observers were necessary so inactivation was announced on May 29, 1944. On June 6, 1944, the allies invaded Europe.

On May 27, 1944, Col. Stewart W. Towle Jr. Commander of the Air Corps, wrote, "I want to express my personal appreciation and that of all the officers and men of this command to the volunteers who have served so loyally and efficiently with us in defense of the eastern seaboard. ... Your country, the Army Air Force, and your fellow Americans owe a debt of gratitude to the members of the Aircraft Warning Service." An observation post survives in Hebron, Connecticut.

== See also ==
- K-class blimp
- Aircraft Warning Service Observation Tower
