= North Fork Sol Duc Shelter =

- U.S. National Register of Historic Places
- Location within Washington (state)
- Location: Along North Fork Sol Duc River Trail, about 17.3 miles (27.8 km) southwest of Port Angeles, Washington, in Olympic National Park
- Nearest city: Port Angeles, Washington
- Coordinates: 47°59′59″N 123°45′48″W
- Area: less than one acre
- Built: 1932
- Architect: U.S. Forest Service
- Architectural style: Rustic
- MPS: Olympic National Park MPS
- NRHP reference No.: 07000725
- Added to NRHP: July 13, 2007

The North Fork Sol Duc Shelter is located in Olympic National Park in Washington. The rustic log building provides shelter to hikers on the park's Sol Duc River trail. It was built about 1932 by the U.S. Forest Service as part of a network of about ninety trail shelters for hikers in what was then Olympic National Forest. The majority of these shelters were removed by the National Park Service in the 1970s. Measuring about 14 feet (4.3 m) by 10 feet (3.0 m), the rectangular shelter is open on the front side. It is constructed with a peeled log frame covered with vertical split-fir board siding. The gabled roofline is broken with a separate shed roof extending to the front. The interior is furnished with bunks. There is no floor.

The North Fork Sol Duc Shelter was added to the National Register of Historic Places on July 13, 2007.
