= Canyon Creek Shelter =

- U.S. National Register of Historic Places
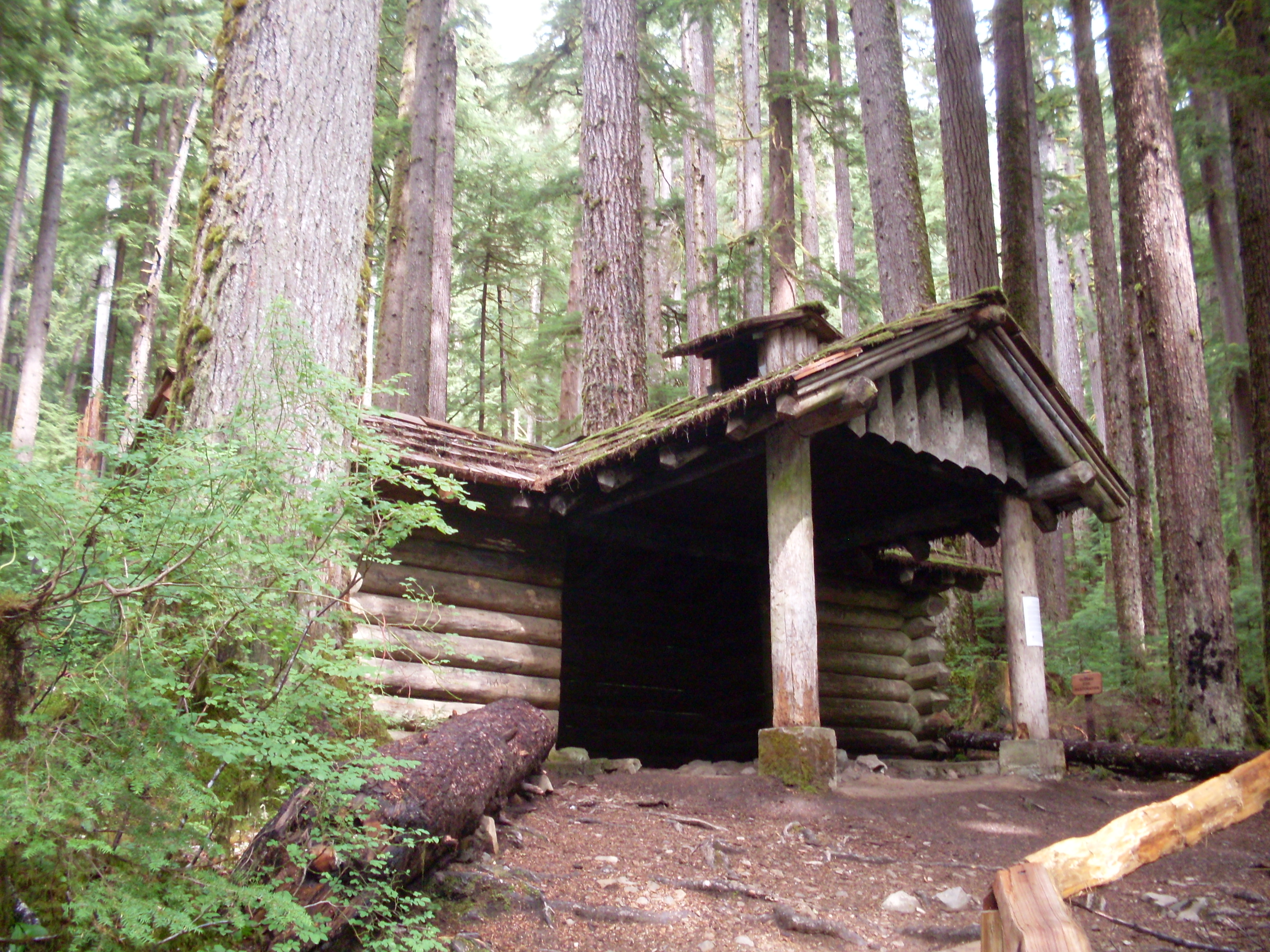

- Location within Washington (state)
- Location: About 0.68 miles (1.09 km) from Sol Duc Trailhead, and about 21.3 miles (34.3 km) southwest of Port Angeles
- Nearest city: Port Angeles, Washington
- Coordinates: 47°57′08″N 123°49′15″W
- Area: less than one acre
- Built: 1939
- Architect: National Park Service; Civilian Conservation Corps
- Architectural style: Rustic
- MPS: Olympic National Park MPS
- NRHP reference No.: 07000712
- Added to NRHP: July 13, 2007

The Canyon Creek Shelter, also known as the Sol Duc Falls Shelter, is a rustic trail shelter in Olympic National Park. It is the last remaining trail shelter built in the park by the Civilian Conservation Corps (CCC) from Camp Elwha. The shelter was built in 1939, shortly after Olympic National Park was established from the U.S. Forest Service-administered Mount Olympus National Monument. Two similar shelters were built at Moose Lake and Hoh Lake, neither of which survived. The one-story log structure is T-shaped, with a projecting front porch crowned by a small cupola. The shelter is open to the front porch.

The shelter was listed on the National Register of Historic Places on July 13, 2007.

== Historic Preservation Efforts ==
The shelter was the focus of historic preservation efforts in 2011, conducted by the University of Oregon's Pacific Northwest Preservation Field School in partnership with the National Park Service. Project work included assessing structural conditions, which guided the use of traditional framing and carpentry techniques to conserve historically significant architectural features. This process including stabilizing or repairing portions of the log sill and frame, in keeping with the Secretary of the Interior's Standards for the Treatment of Historic Properties, along with further repairs to the roof gables and cedar-shake cladding. These repairs required the use of techniques such as saddle-notch log joinery (replicating the shape orientation, and tool-markings identified in the original CCC-era construction).

Owing to its isolated location within the local terrain, carpentry work utilized only traditionally appropriate hand tools, such as framing chisels, slicks, gouges, and drawknives, which were therefore packed in and out on a daily basis. Repair materials included locally sourced Douglas fir logs and western red cedar shakes.

Field team members also generated a set of measured architectural drawings, reflecting 2011 conditions, for inclusion in the Historic American Buildings Survey (HABS), Library of Congress.
