= Peter Roose Homestead =

- U.S. National Register of Historic Places
- U.S. Historic district
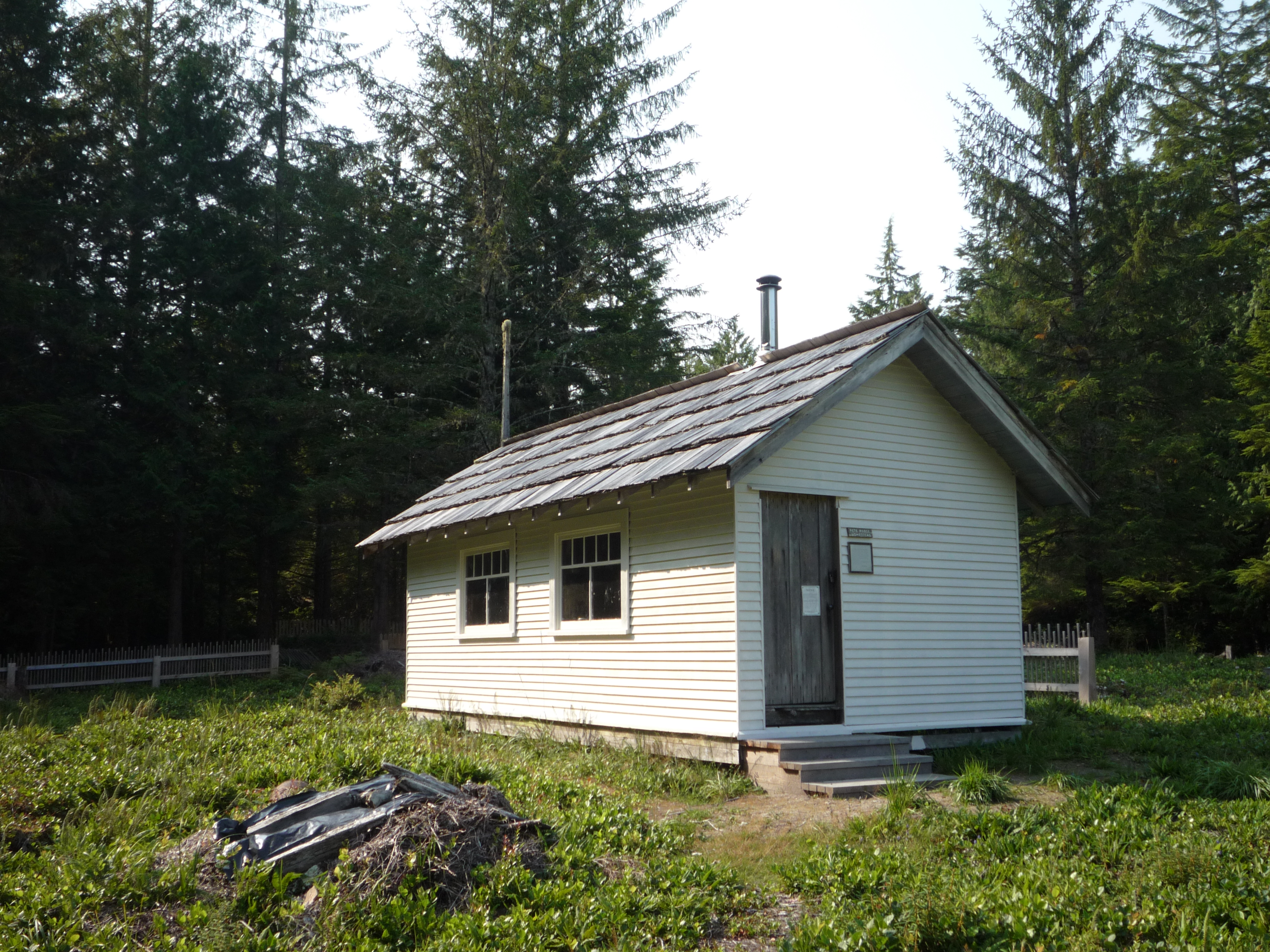
- The Peter Roose house, built in the 1930s.

- Location within Washington (state)
- Location: About 0.4 miles (0.64 km) north of Cape Alava Trail, 1.9 miles (3.1 km) west of Ozette, in Olympic National Park
- Nearest city: Ozette, Washington
- Coordinates: 48°09′42″N 124°42′25″W
- Area: 34 acres (14 ha)
- Built: 1908
- Built by: Peter Roose
- MPS: Olympic National Park MPS
- NRHP reference No.: 07000723
- Added to NRHP: July 13, 2007

The Peter Roose Homestead is a historic homestead in the U.S. state of Washington that was settled by Peter Roose, an immigrant from Bollnäs, Sweden, in 1907. Located in Olympic National Park, the site was added as a historic district to the National Register of Historic Places in 2007.

== Historical importance ==
The Peter Roose Homestead is considered important because it represents the last period of homesteading in western Washington state. It also represents the subsistence lifestyle of the immigrant Scandinavian community that settled in and around Ozette Lake. The construction is all local materials that have held up well under a very wet climate. The site "retains integrity of location, design, setting, materials, workmanship, feeling, and association".

The historic district comprises a 34 acres (14 ha) area, containing five contributing buildings and structures:

- The Peter Roose Cabin, 48°09′40″N 124°42′25″W.
- The Root House, 48°09′40″N 124°42′27″W.
- The Sheep Barn, 48°09′43″N 124°42′23″W.
- The well, 48°09′41″N 124°42′25″W.
- The fencing which encloses the property.

== History ==
The Ozette Lake area of the Olympic Peninsula, Washington, is an area of dense temperate rainforest dominated by Sitka spruce (Picea sitchensis), western red-cedar (Thuja plicata) and western hemlock (Tsuga heterophylla), and was the home of the Makah Indians. Ozette Village, one of five Makah villages, sat on a bench above the beach at Cape Alava, about 3 miles (5 km) west of the lake. This village was first occupied in approximately the year 0 C.E., and was still occupied into the 1930s. A foot trail ran from the village to the northwestern end of Ozette Lake. In the past this trail was called Indian Village Trail. Currently it is called the Cape Alava Trail. The Ozette Village residents used the trail to access both the lake and two open bog wetlands, now called Ahlstrom's Prairie and Roose's Prairie. These open areas, locally called prairies, are about 1.5 miles (2.4 km) from the beach to the west and the lake to the east. They are not prairie in the usual sense, but are herbaceous bogs with peaty soil that is saturated for most of the growing season, and are dominated by mosses, sedges and low growing ericaceous subshrubs; rather than having well-drained soil dominated by grasses. Both Ahlstrom's and Roose's prairies were used to gather berries, Labrador-tea, and basketry materials, and as hunting areas for elk, deer, and black bear. Oral histories from both Makah tribal members and descendants of early settlers indicate that the Makah people regularly burned these prairies to keep the herbaceous bogs from succeeding to trees and dense brush. Bog cranberry (Vaccinium oxycoccus), in particular, grew only in the prairies, and was both a dietary staple and a valuable trade item.

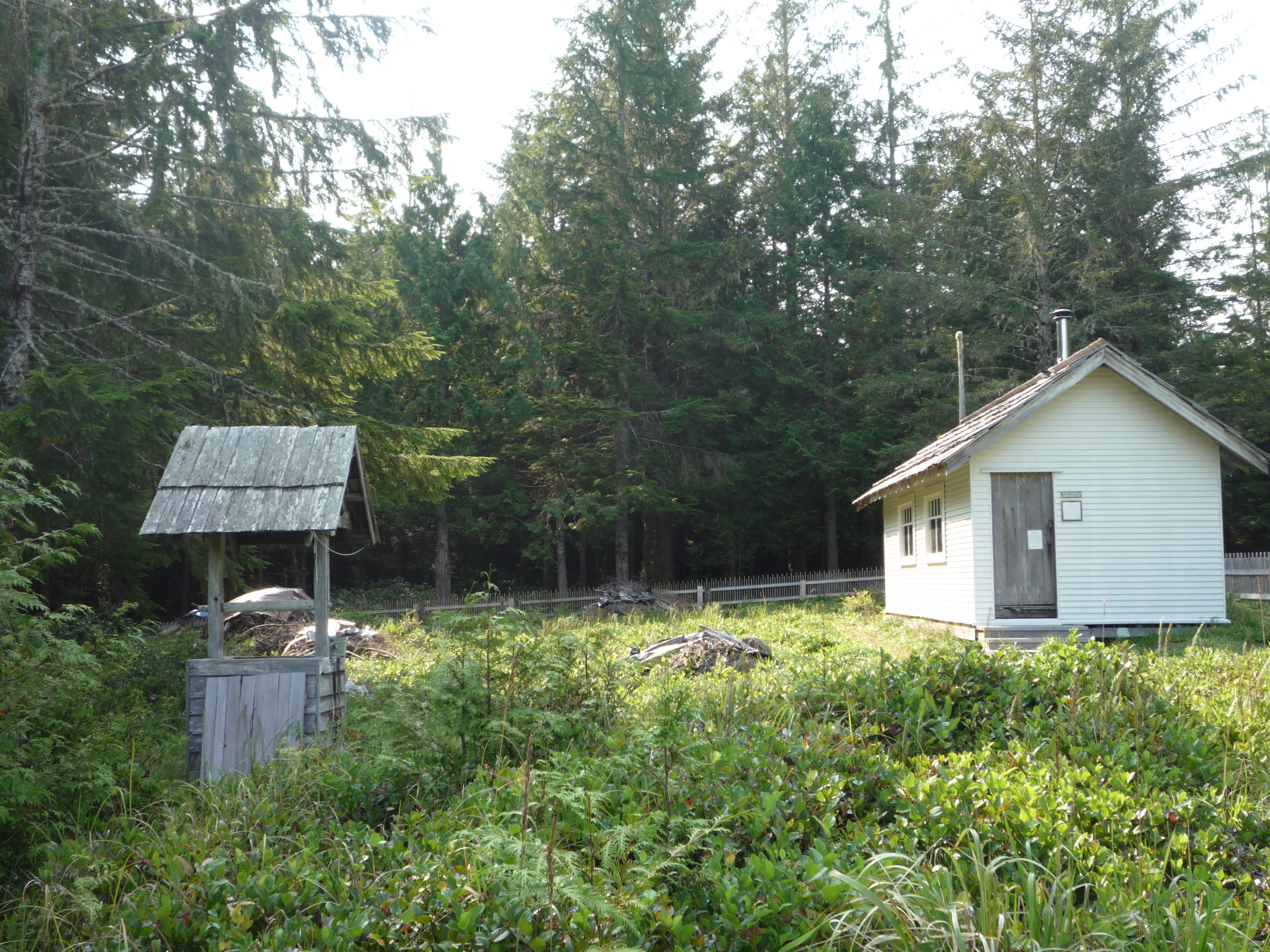
The house and well.

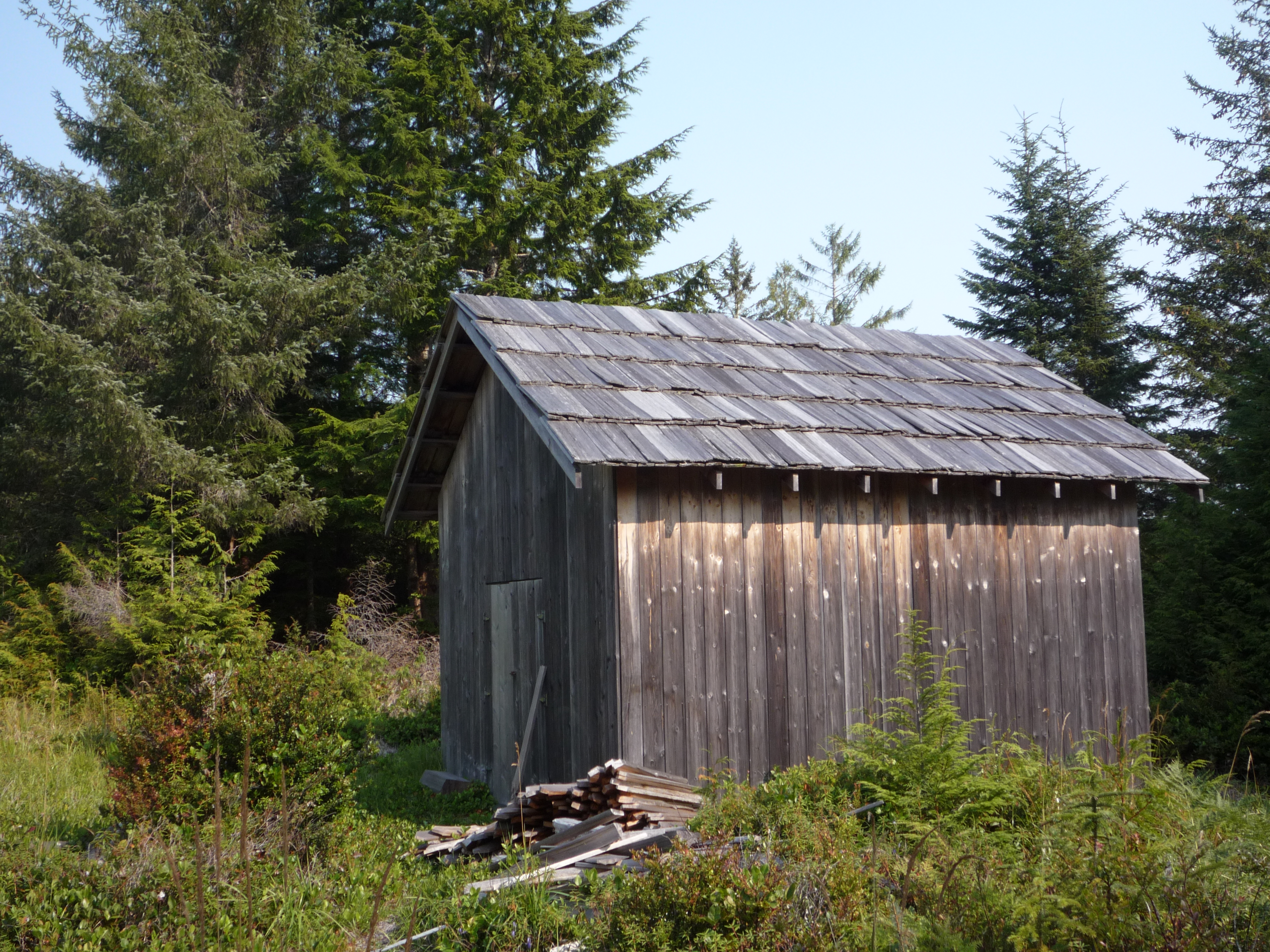
The sheep barn.

Peter Roose settled on one of these prairies when he immigrated to the Ozette Lake area, claiming 160 acres (65 ha) under the Homestead Act. Fellow Swedish immigrant Lars Ahlstrom settled on the other, about one and a quarter miles (2.0 km)] to the south, at about the same time. Where Ahlstrom's prairie had a Makah cabin he could live in initially, Roose, a carpenter by trade, built all his own structures from timber he cut and milled on site. He built a log cabin to live in at first, along with a storage shed/root cellar, well, barn, and outhouse. He built a sawmill, using a boat engine salvaged from a shipwreck on the nearby beach for power. Some time in the 1930s he built the two-room house currently standing on the site, out of milled lumber from his own sawmill. He also built cedar picket fencing to delineate various areas of the homestead. Still standing on the site are the shed, well, barn, fencing, and the second house. The outhouse is barely standing and the sawmill has collapsed. The original cabin is gone.

Roose had a large flock of sheep, and grew potatoes, vegetables, cherries, strawberries, and raspberries. He sold canned mutton, wool, and fruit, worked occasionally as a logger, supplied lumber for construction of the Ozette Lake schoolhouse, and traded with the Makah. He also hunted and had a fish camp on the Ozette River. Following Makah practice, he burned his prairie regularly to keep it open. His only neighbors were the few Makah living in Ozette Village (35 people in 1906, down to 0 by the late 1930s), Lars Ahlstrom, and a few Scandinavian families at the lake. Roose lived alone on the site until his death some time around 1944.

The Ozette Lake and Cape Alava areas, including Roose's homestead, were added to Olympic National Park in 1953.

== Historical context: Homesteading in western Washington state ==
Peter Roose was part of a wave of Scandinavian immigrants to the Pacific Northwest, arriving in the US some time in the early 1900s. By this time good farming land was becoming scarce, and immigrants found themselves pushed into more marginal areas such as the Olympic Peninsula. While the climate was mild, the forest was dense and difficult to clear, the terrain was steep, and the mild maritime climate produced near-constant dampness. However, Scandinavians from Scandinavia and the upper Midwestern states of Minnesota and the Dakotas were attracted by the lack of snow and the apparent fertility of land that could grow such large trees and dense brush. The Ozette Lake area saw a first wave of homesteaders, primarily Scandinavian, starting about 1890. The community was distinct for its isolation, ethnic homogeneity, and self-reliance. The Washington Forest Reserve, established in 1897, initially placed the Ozette Lake area off-limits to homesteaders, leading to abandonment of the area by the residents. The Reserve was reduced in size in 1900 and Ozette Lake was re-opened to homesteading and settled by a second wave of Scandinavian homesteaders.

Getting to Ozette Lake was an arduous journey. Railroads served Seattle and Portland during this time period. From there, prospective homesteaders traveled by ship to the Makah village of Neah Bay, on the Strait of Juan de Fuca, where they hired Makah canoeists to take them to the mouth of the Ozette River or Cape Alava. From the beach, prospective homesteaders had to carry their belongings inland on foot to potential homesteads, on Indian trails or bushwhacking through dense forest and brush. An overland route approached the east side of Ozette Lake from Clallam Bay on a 25-mile-long (40 km) foot trail, now the Hoko-Ozette Road. No roads served the area until the 1920s.
