= Eagle Ranger Station =

- U.S. National Register of Historic Places
- U.S. Historic district
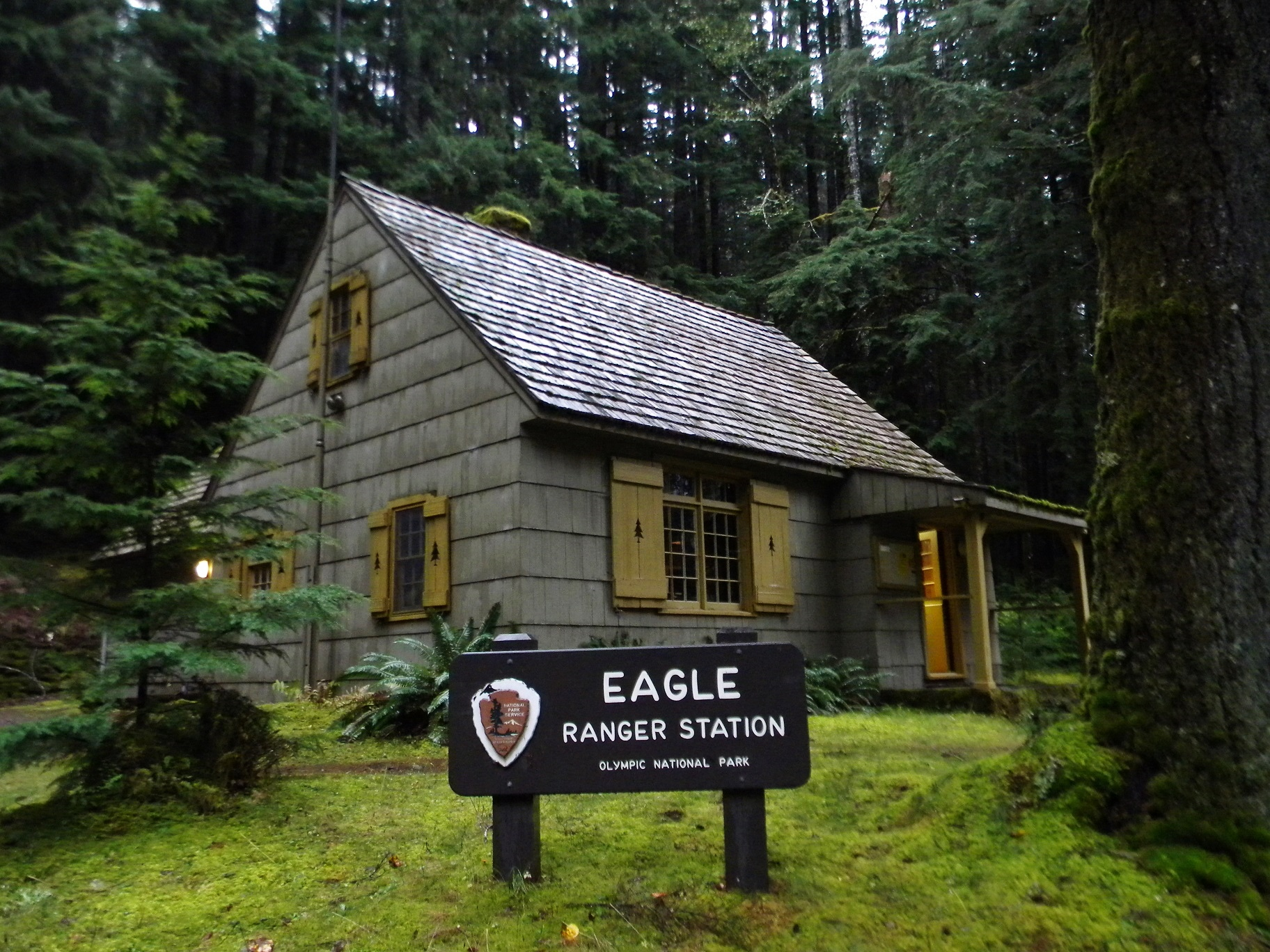

- Location within Washington (state)
- Location: Along Upper Sol Duc Road, about 22.4 miles (36.0 km) southwest of Port Angeles, Washington, in Olympic National Park
- Coordinates: 47°58′20″N 123°51′52″W
- Area: 4 acres (1.6 ha)
- Built: 1936
- Built by: U.S. Forest Service; Civilian Conservation Corps
- Architectural style: Bungalow/Craftsman
- MPS: Olympic National Park MPS
- NRHP reference No.: 07000713
- Added to NRHP: July 13, 2007

The Eagle Ranger Station, also known as the Eagle Guard Station and presently known as the Sol Duc Ranger Station, is a complex of three buildings built in the 1930s in what would become Olympic National Park. The primary structures were built by the U.S. Forest Service in what was at the time the Olympic National Forest., While the main residence was built by the USFS, the generating plant and landscaping were built by the National Park Service using labor provided by the Civilian Conservation Corps.

The ranger station residence was built in 1936, using wood-frame construction. The 1 1/2-story house is a simple gabled structure with an asymmetrically placed porch framed in timbers. The residence is clad in large singles. A large window on the front elevation is divided in the middle by a heavy mullion, with transoms over both units and twelve lights divided by small muntins. Other windows are six-over-six double-hung sashes Rustic shutters with pine-tree cutouts frame the windows, echoing the USFS pine tree symbol. The house is consistent with the Forest Service's standard construction style, incorporating features of bungalow and rustic construction.

The garage was also built in 1936. The one-story structure is of wood-frame construction and is clad in shingles The 1940 generator house was built by the CCC. The one-story frame structure is capped with a hipped roof and topped by a cupola. It lies about 50 feet (15 m) to the east of the residence.

The Eagle Ranger Station was added to the National Register of Historic Places on July 13, 2007.
