= Elwha, Washington =

Unincorporated community in Washington, United States

- Unincorporated community
- Location within Washington (state)
- Coordinates: 48°03′38″N 123°35′40″W
- Country: United States
- State: Washington
- County: Clallam
- Elevation: 433 ft (132 m)
- Time zone: UTC-8 (Pacific (PST))
  - Summer (DST): UTC-7 (PDT)
- GNIS feature ID: 1519320

Elwha is an unincorporated community in Clallam County, Washington, United States. The community is located along U.S. Route 101 about 9 miles (14 km) from Port Angeles, on the northern edge of the Olympic National Park. The community is located on the Elwha River, where the Elwha Ecosystem Restoration Project took place.

The National Park Service usually staffs a ranger station for Olympic National Park in Elwha, although it was closed as of 2025. There is also a small interpretive site commemorating the Elwha River Restoration Project.
