= Most Awesomest Thing Ever =

Entertainment website

The Most Awesome Thing Ever
- Available in: English
- Owner: Big Spaceship
- Website: mostawesomestthingever.com
- Registration: none
- Launched: 15 April 2010; 16 years ago
- Current status: Closed down

Most Awesomest Thing Ever was a website by Big Spaceship which pits two random items such as objects, people, or activities, and asks the user to select which they like better. The site calculated the win-lose ratio and generated a list of the most liked items. The site also allowed users to suggest new ideas as long as the user submits a link to a Wikipedia article and image the idea is based on, as well as their E-mail. The website was shut down at the end of 2022.

== Rankings ==
The website had a ranking of the most and least "most awesomest" things. As of January 15, 2022 the rankings were:

=== The Most Awesomest ===
Ranking	Awesome Thing	Subject/Description
1.	Teleportation	Hypothetical Scientific Concept
2.	Time travel	Hypothetical Scientific Concept
3.	The Universe	All of space and time and their contents
4.	Internet	Information technology
5.	Life	Biological concept
6.	Earth	Planet that is the only astronomical object known to harbor life
7.	Computer	Information technology
8.	Wi-Fi	Information technology
9.	Water	Chemical compound
10.	Pizza	Food

=== The Most Inadequatest ===
Ranking	Inadequate Thing	Subject/Description
4418.	Justin Bieber	Musician
4417.	Kevin Federline	American dancer, DJ, and actor. Ex-husband of Britney Spears
4416.	Sanjaya Malakar	Singer and American Idol finalist.
4415.	Jonas Brothers	American pop rock band.
4414.	Edward Cullen	Fictional vampire in the teen romance book series and movie series Twilight.
4413.	Perez Hilton	American celebrity gossip blogger.
4412.	Byron Dorgan	American author, businessman and former politician from Nebraska.
4411.	Who's That Girl	1987 comedy film starring Madonna.
4410.	Marisa Berenson	American actress and former model.
4409.	Rush Limbaugh	Conservative talk radio host.
