= Life and Death: Twilight Reimagined =

2015 novel by Stephenie Meyer

- Author: Stephenie Meyer
- Language: English
- Series: Twilight series
- Genre: Young adult, fantasy, romance, vampire
- Publisher: Little, Brown Books for Young Readers (Paperback)
- Publication date: 6 October 2015 (hardcover); 1 November 2016 (paperback) 1 November 2016 (kindle)
- Publication place: United States
- Media type: Print, E-book, Audiobook
- Pages: 442 (Hardcover); 400 (Paperback)
- ISBN: 9780316505451

Life and Death: Twilight Reimagined is a young adult vampire-romance novel by Stephenie Meyer. The story is a gender-swapped retelling of the first book in the Twilight series, and introduces Beau Swan and Edythe Cullen in place of Bella and Edward. The book was originally published on October 6, 2015 as part of an "oversized flip-book pairing" with Twilight to celebrate the original novel's tenth anniversary. An audiobook (CD) was released by Penguin Random House on the same day.

== Plot ==
Mirroring the plot of Twilight, Life and Death: Twilight Reimagined follows 17-year-old Beaufort Swan as he leaves the sunny environment of Phoenix, Arizona, where he has spent most of his life with his mother, Renée Dwyer, to the gloomy town of Forks, Washington, to spend the rest of his high school career with his estranged father, police chief Charlie Swan.

Even though Beau never had many friends in Phoenix, he attracts attention at his new school, and is befriended by several students. Much to his dismay, several girls in the school compete for Beau's attention.

As Beau walks into biology class, a fan blows his scent towards Edythe Cullen. Beau sits next to Edythe on his first day of school, but she seems repulsed by him, hurting his feelings in the process. She disappears for a few days, but warms up to Beau upon her return; their newfound relationship is interrupted after Beau is nearly crushed by a van in the school parking lot. Edythe saves Beau, stopping the van with only her hand.

During a trip to La Push, Beau tricks a family friend, Julie 'Jules' Black of the Quileute tribe, into telling him the local tribal legends and he finds out why, although Edythe and her family, the Cullens, have lived in Forks for two years, they have never really been accepted by the townsfolk. Julie mentions the Cullens, and says that most of the reservation believes that they are vampires, though she doesn't think so. During a trip to Port Angeles, Edythe rescues Beau again, this time from a band of gangsters intent on killing him. Beau asks her if what Julie said about her family is true. Edythe admits that she and her family are vampires, but says that she and her family only drink animal blood to keep themselves from turning into monsters, unlike other vampires.

Edythe and Beau's relationship grows over time and they fall in love. Their foremost problem is that to Edythe, Beau's scent is a hundred times more potent than any other human's, making Edythe struggle to resist her desire to kill him. However, despite this, they manage to stay together safely for a while.

The seemingly perfect state of their relationship is thrown into chaos when another vampire coven sweeps into Forks and Joss, a sadistic tracker vampire, decides that she wants to hunt Beau for sport. Edythe's family plans to distract the tracker by splitting up Beau and Edythe, and Beau is sent to hide in a hotel in Phoenix. Beau then gets a phone call from Joss in which she says that she has his mother, and Beau is forced to give himself up to Joss at an old ballet studio near his mother's house. Upon meeting her, Beau discovers his mother wasn't at the dance studio and was safe all along. Joss attacks Beau, but Edythe, along with the rest of the Cullen family, rescue Beau before Joss can kill him. Unfortunately, Joss has already bitten him and the venom has spread too far into his system, resulting in Beau becoming a vampire. The Cullens fake Beau's death for his privacy, and he continues his relationship with Edythe and they get engaged.

Sometime later, the Quileute wolves confront the Cullens, believing them responsible for Beau's death. Beau and the Cullens manage to convince the wolves to believe the truth after a conversation with tribal elder Bonnie Black. When the wind blows Bonnie's scent to Beau, he manages to stay in control of himself, much to the surprise of Edythe and her mother Carine. With everything resolved, Beau and Edythe are free to enjoy their love together "forever" and get married in the future.

== Characters ==
Main Characters:

- Beaufort "Beau" Swan: a 17-year-old human who leaves his home in Phoenix, Arizona to live with his father, Charlie, in the gloomy town of Forks. In his high school, Beau meets vampire Edythe Cullen and later falls in love with her. However, another vampire called Joss tries to kill him and bites him; this results in Beau turning into a vampire. For his privacy, the Cullens faked Beau's death. By the end of the book, Edythe and Beau get engaged and later on married.
- Edythe Cullen: a 104-year-old vampire who lives in the town of Forks with her adopted family, the Cullens. She meets Beau in high school and, at first, is distant and gloomy from him but later on starts to like him. After a while, they start to fall in love. Edythe tries her best to protect Beau after a vampire called Joss tries to kill him; however, Joss bites Beau which results in him turning into a vampire. After faking Beau's death for his privacy, he and Edythe get engaged and are later married.
- Carine Cullen: Edythe, Royal, Eleanor, Archie and Jessamine's adoptive mother and Earnest's wife. She is the matriarch of the Cullen clan. When the Quileute wolves confront the Cullens (believing them responsible for Beau's "death"), Carine converses with the Quileute tribal elder Bonnie Black.
- Archie Cullen: Edythe, Royal and Eleanor's adoptive brother and Jessamine's mate. He has the power to see the future and uses this to warn the other Cullens about Joss' hunt for Beau. He is very supportive of Edythe and Beau's relationship and becomes one of Beau's good friends. When Joss starts hunting Beau, Archie and Jessamine take Beau to Phoenix, Arizona and go into hiding.
- Royal Hale: Edythe, Archie and Jessamine's adoptive brother and Eleanor's mate. He dislikes Beau and ignores his relationship with Edythe. Even after Beau is turned into a vampire, Royal ignores him but does not object to him joining them.
- Jessamine Hale: Edythe, Royal and Eleanor's adoptive sister and Archie's mate. When Joss starts hunting Beau, she and Archie take Beau to Phoenix, Arizona and go into hiding. She has the power of pathokinesis, which means that she can sense and change the emotions of others around her.
- Eleanor Cullen: Edythe, Archie and Jessamine's adoptive sister and Royal's mate. Unlike her mate Royal, Eleanor doesn't hate Beau but instead takes a liking to him.
- Joss: a tracker vampire who tried to hunt Beau for sport. She was the leader of her coven and mate of Victor. After tricking Beau by lying and saying that she had his mother and would kill her if he didn't come to meet her, she bit Beau and turned him into a vampire before being killed by Eleanor and Jessamine.

Secondary Characters:

- Julie "Jules" Black: a very old family friend of Beau's who is tricked by him into admitting that the Cullens are vampires. She is a member of the Quileute tribe.
- Bonnie Black: the tribal elder of the Quileute tribe and mother of Julie.

== Reception ==
Life and Death: Twilight Reimagined received mixed reviews.

Common Sense Media gave the book 3 out of 5 stars, saying, "This reimagined Twilight with swapped genders (Bella is Beau, Edward is Edythe) and most of the same content will primarily interest Twi-hards and anyone in a gender studies class." Student-run The Yorker magazine gave the book a negative review, writing that "the stench of a quick money-making scheme was quite potent." Book blogger Jessica at Books: A True Story awarded the book 4 out of 5 stars but noted "a lot of the book is copied and pasted" from Twilight. Sara Dobie Bauer, writing for SheKnows.com, called the "recycled story" a "shameless cash cow."
