= The Twilight Saga: New Moon =

2009 film by Chris Weitz

- Theatrical release poster
- Directed by: Chris Weitz
- Screenplay by: Melissa Rosenberg
- Based on: New Moon by Stephenie Meyer
- Produced by: Wyck Godfrey; Karen Rosenfelt
- Starring: Kristen Stewart; Robert Pattinson; Taylor Lautner; Ashley Greene; Rachelle Lefevre; Billy Burke; Peter Facinelli; Nikki Reed; Kellan Lutz; Jackson Rathbone; Anna Kendrick; Michael Sheen; Dakota Fanning
- Cinematography: Javier Aguirresarobe
- Edited by: Peter Lambert
- Music by: Alexandre Desplat
- Production companies: Temple Hill Entertainment; Maverick Films/Imprint Entertainment; Sunswept Entertainment
- Distributed by: Summit Entertainment
- Release dates: November 16, 2009 (Mann Village Theater); November 20, 2009 (United States)
- Running time: 130 minutes
- Country: United States
- Language: English
- Budget: $50 million
- Box office: $712 million

The Twilight Saga: New Moon is a 2009 American romantic fantasy film directed by Chris Weitz from a screenplay by Melissa Rosenberg, based on the 2006 novel New Moon by Stephenie Meyer. It is the sequel to Twilight (2008) and the second installment of The Twilight Saga film series. The film stars Kristen Stewart, Robert Pattinson, and Taylor Lautner, reprising their roles as Bella Swan, Edward Cullen, and Jacob Black, respectively. In the film, Bella gets closer with Jacob, who is a werewolf, after Edward leaves her, but when the vampire decides to take a drastic move, she must make a decision between the two.

Summit Entertainment announced it had greenlit the film on November 22, 2008, following the early success of Twilight. Principal photography began on March 23, 2009, in Vancouver, Canada, and ended in Montepulciano, Italy on May 29.

The Twilight Saga: New Moon premiered at the Mann Village Theater in Westwood, California on November 16, 2009, and was theatrically released in the United States on November 20, by Summit Entertainment. The film received generally negative reviews from critics, and grossed $712 million worldwide, becoming the seventh-highest-grossing film of 2009. It set domestic box office records as the biggest midnight opening in the United States and Canada, grossing $26.3 million, which was superseded by its sequel, The Twilight Saga: Eclipse. This led to the highest single-day domestic gross on an opening day, with $72.7 million, until it was beaten by Harry Potter and the Deathly Hallows – Part 2 (2011). The film also became the widest independent release, playing in 4,024 theaters, until it was surpassed by The Twilight Saga: Eclipse. New Moon was released on DVD and Blu-ray on March 20, 2010. As of July 2012, the film has grossed $184.9 million in North American DVD sales, selling more than 8.8 million units, four million of which were sold within its first weekend, beating Twilight's 3.8 million units sold in its first two days.

The film was followed by three sequels, The Twilight Saga: Eclipse, The Twilight Saga: Breaking Dawn – Part 1, and The Twilight Saga: Breaking Dawn – Part 2, in 2010, 2011, and 2012, respectively.

== Plot ==
In Forks, Washington, on Bella Swan's eighteenth birthday, she awakens from a dream in which she is an old woman and Edward Cullen, her immortal vampire boyfriend, is forever young.

Edward's family hosts a birthday reception for Bella at their home. After she sustains a paper cut and is almost attacked by a bloodthirsty Jasper Cullen, Edward realizes he has put her life in danger by putting her amidst vampires. After rumors start spreading of Carlisle's age and appearance, Edward ends his relationship with Bella and the Cullens leave town.

Bella is left severely depressed and isolates herself for months, during which she has night terrors, enough to push her father, Charlie, to his breaking point where he considers relocating Bella to her mother's place. She accepts a ride from a biker and the dangerous encounter reminds her of a near-assault from which Edward rescued her. She realizes that dangerous activities cause her to hallucinate his image. Her Quileute friend Jacob Black supports her during her slump.

While attending a movie with Bella, Jacob abruptly shows signs of pain and leaves. He cuts his long hair and now exhibits the same Quileute tattoo as leader Sam and the other tribe members. He reveals that he knows the Cullens are vampires and inexplicably tells Bella to stay away.

When Bella hikes to the meadow that she and Edward often visit, she is confronted by Laurent seeking to avenge the Cullens' past killing of James. A wolf pack saves her, killing Laurent, and Bella soon discovers that Jacob and the other tribe members are werewolves, with Jacob only recently gaining this shapeshifting ability. Their age-old enemies are vampires, though a treaty exists between the Cullens and the tribe.

Edward believes that Bella has killed herself after his clairvoyant adoptive sister Alice has a vision of her jumping off a seaside cliff and when he phones her house, Jacob answers saying her father is out preparing a funeral. Distraught, Edward travels to Italy to ask the vampire council, the Volturi, to end his life. When they refuse, he plans to force their hand by exposing himself as a vampire to humans during a large festival.

Alice and Bella arrive in time to prevent Edward from doing so. Overjoyed that Bella is alive, he confesses that he left Forks to protect her but promises never to leave her again. Edward defends Bella from the Volturi, who do not allow humans to know about their vampire society.

As the Volturi are about to kill Edward, Bella asks that they kill her instead. Impressed by a human's willingness to sacrifice her life for a vampire's, they allow her the choice to be transformed into a vampire instead of dying, convinced when Alice shares a future vision of Bella as a vampire.

After returning to Forks, Bella asks the Cullens to vote on her becoming a vampire. Despite Edward's protestations, everyone except Rosalie votes yes. Charlie is upset with her but allows Edward to be with her and grounds her for leaving with no explanation.

Bella tells Edward she wants him to be the one to turn her into a vampire. Jacob confronts the pair, reminding Edward that the years-old treaty with Quileute will be broken if any Cullen bites a human, but Bella tells him it is her choice, not the Cullens'. Edward agrees to turn Bella into a vampire only if she will marry him.

== Cast ==
- Kristen Stewart as Bella Swan, a teenage girl who falls into a deep depression after her true love, Edward Cullen, leaves her. Her friendship with Jacob Black is expanded as she realizes that he can mend the hole left open by Edward.
- Robert Pattinson as Edward Cullen, Bella's vampire boyfriend who abruptly leaves town to protect her.
- Taylor Lautner as Jacob Black, a cheerful companion who eases Bella's pain over losing Edward. He reveals to Bella that he is part of a pack of werewolves whose main goal is to protect her from the vampires Laurent and Victoria.
- Ashley Greene as Alice Cullen, a member of the Cullen family who can see "subjective" visions of the future and who develops a deep friendship with Bella
- Rachelle Lefevre as Victoria Sutherland, a ruthless vampire who wants to avenge her lover, James This would be her final appearance as the character before being replaced by Bryce Dallas Howard in the next installment a year later.
- Billy Burke as Charlie Swan, Bella's father and Forks' Chief of Police
- Michael Sheen as Aro, the leader of an ancient Italian vampire coven known as the Volturi
- Dakota Fanning as Jane, a guard of the Volturi who has the ability to torture people with illusions of pain
- Peter Facinelli as Carlisle Cullen, leader and father figure of the Cullen family
- Elizabeth Reaser as Esme Cullen, Carlisle's wife and the mother figure of the Cullen family
- Jackson Rathbone as Jasper Hale, a member of the Cullen family who thirsts for Bella's blood after she receives a paper cut. He has the ability to manipulate emotions.
- Kellan Lutz as Emmett Cullen, a member of the Cullen family who is physically the strongest vampire of the family.
- Nikki Reed as Rosalie Hale, a member of the Cullen family
- Edi Gathegi as Laurent Da Revin, a vampire who wants to kill Bella, because he thirsts for her blood
- Graham Greene as Harry Clearwater, a Quileute elder and Charlie's friend
- Gil Birmingham as Billy Black, a Quileute elder and Jacob's physically disabled father
- Anna Kendrick as Jessica Stanley, Bella's self-involved friend
- Michael Welch as Mike Newton, Bella's friend who has a crush on her. He joins her on a date with Jacob.
- Justin Chon as Eric Yorkie, Bella's friend and Angela's boyfriend
- Christian Serratos as Angela Weber, Bella's shy but caring friend
- Jamie Campbell Bower as Caius, a Volturi elder who is very strict about vampire laws
- Christopher Heyerdahl as Marcus, a Volturi elder who has the gift of seeing the relationship connections between people
- Daniel Cudmore as Felix, a Volturi guard who has supreme strength
- Charlie Bewley as Demetri, a Volturi guard who is a gifted tracker
- Chaske Spencer as Sam Uley, Alpha of the Wolf Pack
- Tyson Houseman as Quil Ateara
- Kiowa Gordon as Embry Call
- Alex Meraz as Paul Lahote
- Bronson Pelletier as Jared Cameron
- Tinsel Korey as Emily Young, Sam's imprinted fiancée whom he once hurt unintentionally
- Justine Wachsberger as Gianna, Volturi's human secretary
- Cameron Bright as Alec, Jane's brother who has the ability to cut off senses
- Noot Seear as Heidi, who leads the tourists into the Volturi's chamber and urges them to stay together while Demetri leads Bella, Alice and Edward in the opposite direction. Heidi's special ability is to make herself attractive to other people, regardless of species or gender.

== Production ==
=== Development ===
Director Chris Weitz at The Twilight Saga: New Moon photocall in Paris, France, in November 2009

In early November 2008, Summit Entertainment obtained the film adaptation rights to the remaining novels in the Twilight book series, New Moon, Eclipse, and Breaking Dawn. On November 22, 2008, one day after the theatrical release of Twilight, Summit confirmed that they would begin working on New Moon. Author Stephenie Meyer said, "I don't think any other author has had a more positive experience with the makers of her movie adaptation than I have had with Summit Entertainment." In early December 2008, it was announced that Twilight director Catherine Hardwicke would not be returning to direct the sequel. Hardwicke cited time restrictions as the reason behind her leaving the project. On December 13, 2008, it was announced that Chris Weitz had been hired to direct New Moon. Weitz released a statement shortly after the announcement, assuring fans that he would "protect on their behalf the characters, [the] themes and story they love." He continued by saying, "This is not a task to be taken lightly, and I will put every effort into realizing a beautiful film to stand alongside a beautiful book."

Screenwriter Melissa Rosenberg had been working on adapting the novel prior to Twilight's release and handed in the draft for New Moon during Twilight's opening weekend in November 2008, adding, "I would sit down at ten o'clock in the morning and work on [the script]... until six o'clock in the evening." Rosenberg spent the months of June through October 2008 alternating between writing for the Showtime television series Dexter and writing New Moon on weekends. She and Meyer kept in touch during this five-month period.

=== Casting ===
Due to major physical changes that occur in the character of Jacob Black between Twilight and New Moon, Weitz considered replacing Taylor Lautner in the sequel with an actor who could more accurately portray "the new, larger Jacob Black". In an attempt to keep the role, Lautner weight-trained extensively and gained approximately 30 pounds. In January 2009, Weitz and Summit Entertainment announced that Lautner would continue to play the role of Jacob in the sequel. In an interview, fellow cast member Kristen Stewart talked about Lautner's transformation saying, "He's an entirely different person physically." Singer Taylor Swift, a fan of Twilight, requested a cameo appearance in the film, but Wetiz declined as he felt it would be too distracting.

In late March 2009, Summit Entertainment released a list of the actors who would be portraying the "wolf pack" alongside Lautner. The casting for the rest of the Quileute tribe was headed by casting director Rene Haynes, who has worked on films with large Native American casts, such as Dances with Wolves and Bury My Heart at Wounded Knee. A casting call was also held in Vancouver in February 2009, specifically asking for "any first nations/aboriginal actors and actresses between the ages of 15 and 25".

=== Filming ===
Pre-production for New Moon began in December 2008. Principal photography was scheduled to begin on March 23, 2009, in Vancouver, but began a few days early. Weitz envisioned a warm color palette for the sequel, contrary to the first film in the series, whose blue tones were prevalent. His intention resulted in golden tones, a change that was inspired by Italian paintings, and ultimately served as the basis for the crew's collaborative work. The approach also included the use of specific colors at certain points in the movie. For example, although Jacob's house is red, the color does not dominate until the climax of the movie. The director noted that, "The square becomes a flood of red, that's how conscious we were of every visual aspect."

The use of film, rather than digital cameras, added to the "old-fashioned" nature of the production. Two main Panavision cameras, a high-speed Arri 435 camera capable of shooting at 150 frames per second, a Steadicam, and VistaVision cameras for visual effect shots were among the equipment used to bring the book to the big screen. As with the use of specific colors, the different cameras and shooting setups would help serve the story points. When Bella was with Edward, the camera was moved on a dolly, in a very rigid, straight line to reflect how their relationship was "perfect". When Bella is with Jacob, the Steadicam provides a fluid and organic style; and when she is with her schoolmates, a slangy visual language is reflected by a handheld.

Once the film went into production, the decision to shoot in Vancouver, rather than in Portland, came after a debate on how to match the locations that were introduced in the first film. One member involved in the decision process pointed out that Vancouver had been scouted as a potential setting for Twilight, and it was only because the U.S. dollar had, at that time, dropped below the Canadian dollar that Oregon drew Twilight principal photography to Portland and its surrounding areas. Vancouver was chosen because it allowed a higher production value, while the surrounding areas contained beautiful forests and gray weather. With this decision, however, came the issue of reconstructing key sets that were used in the first film. For the exterior of Forks High School, crew members were able to find a parking lot, but the school's steps needed to be filmed with a greenscreen backing to match those that were originally presented in Twilight. David Thompson Secondary School would then be able to serve as the interior for the high school scenes.

The Cullen house was one of the major "match" assignments, mainly because of the Portland area location's unique design. The production team agreed to find a house in the Vancouver area with an interior that emulated the high ceilings, glass walls, and forest surroundings of the first location. One location was positively compared to the one in Portland, and therefore Weitz and the production team filmed portions of the film there. To keep with the design of the original house, portions of the story that took place in New Moon were moved to different sections of the house that were not seen before.

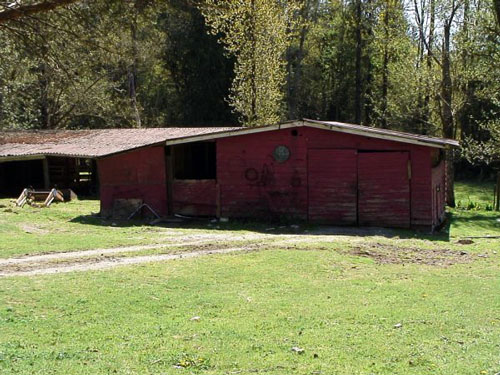
Jacob's house as depicted in The Twilight Saga: New Moon

After scouting Vancouver for a place to film scenes that involved the Swan house, the decision was made to recreate the house on an empty lot with a tree line and approaching road. The production team was able to rearrange the exterior of the house to match that in the first movie. When faced with creating the interior, the team measured the house in Portland, and built various pieces of the house on the lot and on a stage in Vancouver. The second film also attempted to clarify the location of Bella's room, which, as seen in the first film, seemed to be located in the front of the house, when in reality it was on the right-hand side. Complications arose when the Portland house was repainted after Twilight's release, which took away the aging the house had come to depict in the film. When recreating the house, the production team referenced the first film on high-definition Blu-ray Disc.

As a director, Weitz had the pleasure of introducing and filming on new locations and sets. Of particular interest was the Quileute reservation and Jacob's house. Using the Quileute country in Washington as a basis, the production team decided to place Jacob's house on the edges of the territory, rather than in the community, because of Jacob's attachment to the wolves. To Weitz, Jacob's house was the stepping stone into the forest world, where the reality of the werewolves is hidden. The production designer was faced with a "real world" versus "book world" challenge when the barn they located, described in the book as a red barn, was green. Initially bordered by a green fence, the decision of painting the barn, aging it, and renovating the exterior proved to be a layout that fit well with Jacob's character.

After scouting more than twelve possible locations to film scenes that would take place in Volterra, Italy, the scouting team selected the town of Montepulciano, which they believe was the best representation of Meyer's description in the book. Principal photography concluded with the scenes that were filmed in this area from May 25 through the 29. For the face-off between the Volturi and Edward, the idea was to have a bigger "bang", rather than just the paralysis of Edward. Initially what was a huge battle with vampires being thrown everywhere turned into a one-on-one fight between Felix and Edward, after receiving a stamp of approval from Meyer. The idea quickly changed from the typical outlandish battle, to portraying Edward as an average guy caught in the middle of a bad situation; for Bella, conveying the feeling of being caught in the middle of a group of vampires fighting was important as well. This scene also required special effects, stunt work, and figuring out how to portray vampires fighting at very fast speeds.

=== Visual effects ===
Overseeing the visual effects department for New Moon was Susan MacLeod, who had previously worked with Weitz during the production of The Golden Compass. MacLeod enlisted Tippett Studio to create the computer-generated wolves, while Prime Focus of Vancouver handled the effects of the vampires. To prepare for the aggressive task of making the wolves look real, Tippet artists studied wolf culture. They also were able to reflect leadership and human muscle size by adjusting certain features of the wolves, such as their fat and height. In February 2009, a group of artists was able to travel to Wolf Mountain Sanctuary, outside of Los Angeles, and see real wolves. The artists were able to observe the behavior of both the timber and arctic wolves, who ran in packs of three to five. The idea was to give everyone a deeper feeling of the creature that they were creating.

One of the scenes Tippett Studio was responsible for animating

MacLeod explained that creating the shape-shifting werewolves was not an easy task. The wolf work included shooting "plates", or photographic imagery into which CGI creations are integrated. Since the book described the wolves as being as big as horses, full-scale aluminum and board wolf cutouts were used as a visual reference for both actors and crew members. Once the actors had a reference, the cutouts would be removed allowing the cameras to capture the scene. For the CGI wolves to be in sync with the live-action cameras and actors' movements, the team used match movers, a land surveying tool that recorded the shooting location's topography with reference marks.

A raw 3D model of Jacob's wolf was the basis for creating the others. A muscle system, which gave the appearance of muscles firing and flexing, contributed to this model. From there, the initial fur layout went to painters who were responsible for its color and groom. They also added characteristics, such as wet hair clumping together, and applied it to the fur. They refined this look before passing it off to the lighting and technical directors.

One challenge for the production team was how to convey Bella's depression once Edward departed. In the novel, these pages were filled with the names of the passing months, and in the movie, would be represented as a visual effects shot with a camera circling Kristen Stewart. The window that was used for the original film did not quite fit what Weitz was looking for, so the production team created a bay window when recreating the Swan house. The effect was one of the 300 visual effects helmed by Prime Focus led by visual effects supervisor Eric Pascarelli. It required matching two camera shots: one that shot the actress in a chair, and the other shooting the view outside the window as seen from the house built on location. Using a greenscreen, Prime Focus was able to enhance the changing of seasons with computer-generated leaves and falling snow.

=== Music ===
The score for New Moon was composed by Alexandre Desplat while the rest of the soundtrack was chosen by music supervisor Alexandra Patsavas, who also produced the Twilight soundtrack. The Twilight Saga: New Moon: Original Motion Picture Soundtrack was released on October 16, 2009, by Patsavas's Chop Shop label, in conjunction with Atlantic Records. It debuted at number two on the Billboard 200 albums chart, and climbed to number one a week later after selling 153,000 copies in its first full week of release.

Notable tracks from the album include "Meet Me on the Equinox", by Death Cab for Cutie, which was written specifically for the film and which debuted September 13, 2009 during the MTV Video Music Awards.

== Distribution ==
=== Marketing ===
In February 2009 it was announced that the franchise would take the name The Twilight Saga with the book's title separated by a colon, though the title that appears on-screen is simply New Moon. The first promotional poster was released on May 19, 2009. On May 31, Robert Pattinson, Kristen Stewart, and Taylor Lautner revealed the film's first trailer at the MTV Movie Awards. Following the release of the trailer, two scenes from the film were presented at the 2009 San Diego Comic-Con. A 14-second preview of the second trailer was released online on August 12, 2009, and the full-length trailer was featured before theater showings of the film Bandslam. The film's third trailer was shown at the MTV Video Music Awards on September 13, 2009. Spike TV also aired a new trailer at the 2009 Scream Awards on October 27, 2009.

American Idol finalist Allison Iraheta hosted an 8-minute block prior to the showing of the film in over 1,200 theaters across the United States, where she talked about her upcoming album and played some tracks, including "Friday I'll Be Over U", "Pieces", and "Trouble Is". In addition, prior to the film's release, author Stephenie Meyer made an appearance on The Oprah Winfrey Show to promote the film.

=== Release ===
Many theater showings sold out as early as two months prior to New Moon's release date. The film set records for advance ticket sales, causing some theaters to add additional showings. The film is also the biggest advance ticket seller on Fandango, surpassing Star Wars: Episode III – Revenge of the Sith. New Moon accounted for 86 percent of Fandango's online ticket sales the weekend before the film was released, and its total morning ticket sales on November 20, 2009, are estimated to total $13.9 million.

=== Home media ===
Various midnight release parties were held to help promote the film's DVD and Blu-ray Disc release on March 20, 2010, in the United States and on March 22, 2010, in the United Kingdom. Special features include an audio commentary by director Chris Weitz and editor Peter Lambert, a behind-the-scenes documentary, and music videos. Unlike the DVD and Blu-ray Disc versions, the Ultimate Fan Edition DVD includes a 7-minute first look at the sequel, The Twilight Saga: Eclipse. Within its first weekend of release in the U.S., the film sold over 4 million units, beating Twilight's 3.8 million units sold in its first two days. In North American DVD sales, the film has currently grossed $185,166,822 and has sold more than 8,864,541 units.

== Reception ==
=== Box office ===
New Moon set records as the biggest midnight opening in domestic (United States and Canada) box office history, grossing an estimated $26.3 million in 3,514 theaters. The record was previously held by Harry Potter and the Half-Blood Prince, which grossed $22.2 million domestically during its midnight premiere. In 2010, the following sequel, The Twilight Saga: Eclipse, broke New Moon's record with $30 million in over 4,000 theaters but surpassed by Harry Potter and the Deathly Hallows – Part 2, which made $43.5 million in 2011. The film grossed $72.7 million on its opening day domestically, becoming the biggest single-day opening in domestic history, beating The Dark Knight's $67.2 million. This opening strongly contributed to another record—the first time that the Top 10 films at the domestic box office had a combined gross of over $100 million in a single day. The record was later broken in 2011 by Harry Potter and the Deathly Hallows – Part 2, which made $91.1 million.

New Moon's opening weekend is the ninth-highest opening weekend in domestic history with $142,839,137 and also is the tenth-highest worldwide opening weekend with $274.9 million total. At the time of its release, the film achieved the highest weekend debut in November, breaking Harry Potter and the Goblet of Fire's record ($102.7 million) until The Hunger Games: Catching Fire surpassed it with $158.1 million. With an estimated budget of just under $50 million, it is the least expensive movie to ever open to more than $200 million worldwide. On Thanksgiving weekend, the film grossed $42.5 million, and including Wednesday and Thursday ticket sales, grossed $66 million. It has earned $230.7 million in total since opening last week, 22% more than the previous film grossed in its entire theatrical run. Internationally, the film grossed roughly $85 million over the weekend, adding up to a total worldwide gross of $473.7 million in 10 days. In its third weekend New Moon grossed $15.7 million in the domestic market and another $40.7 million internationally for a worldwide gross of $570.1 million. In its fourth weekend, the film dropped down to #4 with an estimated $10 million, bringing its domestic total to $296,623,634.

=== Critical response ===
On review aggregator Rotten Tomatoes 28% of 228 critics gave the film a positive review, with a rating average of 4.7/10. The site's general consensus is that "The Twilight Saga's second installment may satisfy hardcore fans of the series, but outsiders are likely to be turned off by its slow pace, relentlessly downcast tone and excessive length." On Metacritic,it has a weighted average rating of 44 out of 100 based on reviews from 32 critics, indicating "mixed or average" reviews. Audiences polled by Cinemascore gave the film an "A−" grade.

Robert Ignizio of the Cleveland Scene described the film as an "entertaining fantasy", and noted that it "has a stronger visual look [than Twilight] and does a better job with its action scenes while still keeping the focus on the central love triangle." Michael O'Sullivan of The Washington Post gave the film two-and-a-half stars out of four, praised Kristen Stewart's performance in the film and wrote, "Despite melodrama that, at times, is enough to induce diabetes, there's enough wolf whistle in this sexy, scary romp to please anyone." The Seattle Post-Intelligencer gave the film a "B" grading and said, "the movie looks tremendous, the dialogue works, there are numerous well-placed jokes, the acting is on point."

Time Out New York gave the film 4 stars out of 5, calling it "acceptable escapism for those old enough to see it yet still young enough to shriek at undead dreamboats." Jordan Mintzer from Variety stated, "Stewart is the heart and soul of the film", and added that she "gives both weight and depth to dialogue...that would sound like typical chick-lit blather in the mouth of a less engaging actress, and she makes Bella's psychological wounds seem like the real deal."

British film critic Mark Kermode gave the film a positive review, saying, "After an initial 20-minute dip, when I thought, 'This is actually going to be two hours of mopey-mopey,' I thought it found its feet." He also excused the film's characterization of Taylor Lautner's character, saying, "The sight of the buff, young guys running through the forest with their tops off was slightly smirk-inducing. But it's fine. They know what their target audience is."

Mick Lasalle from the San Francisco Chronicle responded with a more mixed review, stating, "[E]xpect this film to satisfy its fans. Everybody else, get ready for a bizarre soap opera/pageant, consisting of a succession of static scenes with characters loping into the frame to announce exactly what they're thinking." Digital Spy gave the film 2 stars out of 5, praising Kristen Stewart for "carrying the film on her shoulders and, once again, bringing plenty of soul to a character who might otherwise come across as self-indulgent", but was critical of its lack of action, ultimately calling it "a draining experience". Roger Ebert gave the film 1 star out of 4 and said that it "takes the tepid achievement of Twilight, guts it, and leaves it for undead." Richard Roeper graded New Moon with a C− and called it a "plodding, achingly slow, 130-minute chapter in the saga".

=== Accolades ===
Since its release, New Moon has received several nominations and awards. In March 2010, the film received the ShoWest Fandango Fan Choice Award for 2009's Best Movie. At the 2010 Empire Awards, Pattinson was nominated for Best Actor and Anna Kendrick was nominated for Best Newcomer, the film won the award for Best Fantasy Film, while Pattinson won an award for Best Performance. At the 2010 Nickelodeon Kids' Choice Awards, the film was nominated for Best Movie, but lost to Alvin and the Chipmunks: The Squeakquel, Lautner won an award for Favorite Movie Actor, and Jacob and Bella, who were also nominated alongside Edward and Bella, won an award for Best Couple. At the 2010 MTV Movie Awards, Pattinson, who was nominated alongside Stewart and Lautner, won the award for Global Superstar; the Best Male Performance award was also given to Pattinson, who was, again, nominated against Lautner. Stewart and Pattinson won the award for Best Kiss, while New Moon won the award for Best Movie. For the 2010 Teen Choice Awards, held on August 8, the film and its actors were given a combined total of ten nominations, eight of which the film won, and three separate awards going to The Twilight Saga: Eclipse. In addition, the film was nominated for Best Horror Film and Taylor Lautner was nominated for Best Performance by a Younger Actor at the 36th Saturn Awards, but lost to Drag Me to Hell and Saoirse Ronan, respectively. Lautner was also nominated for Best Performance in a Feature Film – Leading Actor at the 2010 Young Artist Awards. However, it was nominated for four Razzies: Worst Supporting Actor (Robert Pattinson), Worst Screen Couple (Kristen Stewart and either Taylor Lautner or Robert Pattinson), Worst Prequel, Remake, Rip-off or Sequel, and Worst Screenplay.

== Sequel ==
In February 2009, Summit Entertainment scheduled a film adaptation of Eclipse, the third novel in the Twilight series, for release on June 30, 2010. Weitz would not be able to direct the third film of The Twilight Saga as it would be filming while New Moon would be in post-production. David Slade was therefore confirmed as the director of The Twilight Saga: Eclipse on April 22, 2009.

== See also ==
- Vampire films
