= Twilight fandom =

Fan community of the Twilight media franchise

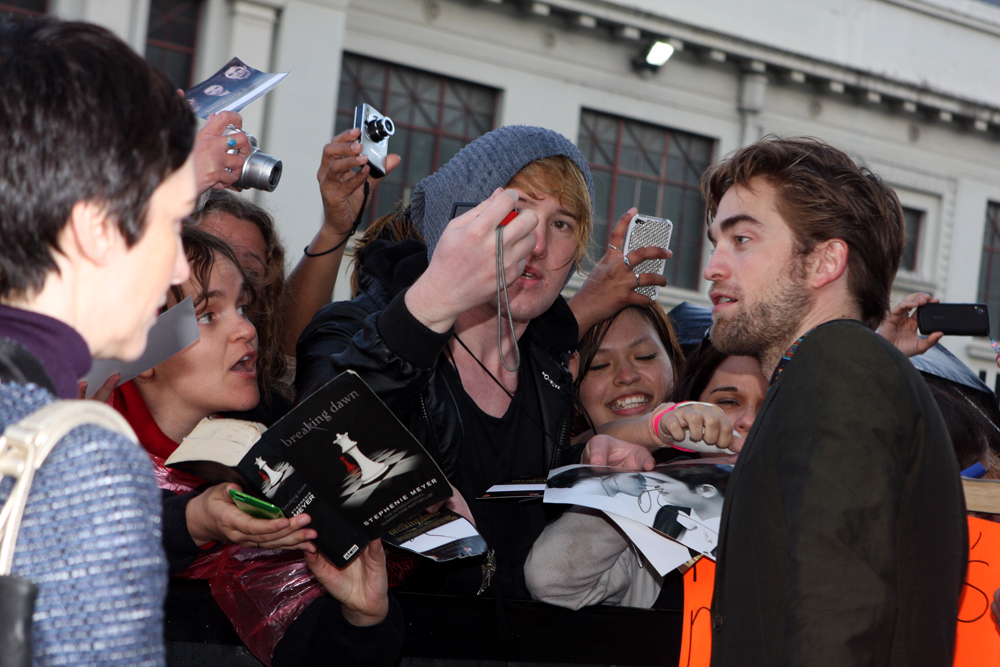
Robert Pattinson meets fans at the premiere of Breaking Dawn - Part 1.

The Twilight fandom is the community of fans of the Twilight series of novels, films and other related media. The fans are known as Twihards, some of the most dedicated fans are known as Rats or Ratties.

There has been conflict between the fans of Twilight and the fans of other series. At Comic-Con in 2008, large numbers of female Twilight fans came to see the panel of actors from the Twilight movies. This upset existing male fans of older genres who protested at this intrusion, "Twilight Ruined Comic-Con".

The fandom was publicly recognized by major news publications in 2010, by the Los Angeles Times, and in 2014, by The Wire, a publication owned by the Atlantic Monthly Group. Both articles discuss the fandom's growing influence as its population of followers grew over time. The impact of the vibrant Twilight fandom and its lasting legacy is explored in a book by Laurena Aker: Fan Phenomena: The Twilight Saga.
