= Midnight Sun (Meyer novel) =

Companion novel to Twilight by Stephenie Meyer

- Official book cover
- Author: Stephenie Meyer
- Language: English
- Series: Twilight Saga
- Subject: Vampires
- Genre: Young adult, Fantasy, Romance novel
- Publisher: Little, Brown and Company
- Publication date: 4 August 2020
- Publication place: United States
- Pages: 658
- ISBN: 9780316707046
- Preceded by: Breaking Dawn

Midnight Sun is a 2020 companion novel to the 2005 book Twilight by author Stephenie Meyer. The work retells the events of Twilight from the perspective of Edward Cullen instead of that of the series' usual narrating character Bella Swan. Meyer stated that Twilight was to be the only book from the series that she planned to rewrite from Edward's perspective. To give them a better feel of Edward's character, Meyer allowed Catherine Hardwicke, the director of the film adaptation of Twilight, and Robert Pattinson, the actor playing Edward, to read some completed chapters of the novel while they shot the film. It was released on August 4, 2020.

== Pre-release history ==
On August 28, 2008, Meyer halted the writing of Midnight Sun in response to the leak of twelve chapters of the unfinished manuscript on the Internet. She stated, "If I tried to write Midnight Sun now, in my current frame of mind, James would probably win and all the Cullens would die, which wouldn't dovetail too well with the original story. In any case, I feel too sad about what has happened to continue working on Midnight Sun, and so it is on hold indefinitely." She made the twelve-chaptered draft available on her website in fairness to her readers, since the novel was compromised before its intended publication date. Meyer also stated that she does not believe the manuscript was leaked with any malicious intent, and declined to give the names of the individuals she felt were at fault.

In a November 2008 interview, Meyer said that, "It's really complicated, because everyone now is in the driver's seat, where they can make judgment calls...I do not feel alone with the manuscript. And I cannot write when I don't feel alone." She said that her goal was to go for around two years without hearing about Midnight Sun, and she thought that she would begin working on the novel again once she was sure that "everyone's forgotten about it".

In 2015, following the release of Life and Death: Twilight Reimagined, the first Twilight novel gender-bent, Meyer felt comfortable to pick up writing again, but as she said to a comic-con panel in 2015: "What do you think was the top story on Yahoo the next morning? Grey." She was referring to Grey: Fifty Shades of Grey as Told by Christian which, as the subtitle says, is a retelling of the first Fifty Shades of Grey book through the eyes of Christian Grey. "It was a literal flip the table moment for me", Meyer reportedly said. The book remained on hold. However, in May 2020, Meyer announced that the book would be released on August 4, 2020.

== Release ==
=== Critical reception ===
Elle Hunt at The Guardian wrote that the book was "chronically overwritten" and under-edited. She lamented the lack of new lore and how the strict adherence to scenes in the original Twilight made the book boring. At The Independent, Annie Lord also noted the large overlap with Twilight, and called the writing "laughably bad", but noted that fans would enjoy gaining new insights into Edward's relationship with his sister. Kirkus Reviews posited that the "glacial pace" of the book allowed for a focus on characterization, and predicted that fans would forgive, or even enjoy, its "excesses and indulgences". At The Washington Post, Karin Tanabe criticized the lack of diversity in the characters, describing the Quileute characters as "stereotypical B-list characters". She also noted that the sexual tension between the two main characters was hindered by having to adhere to the original storyline.

=== Sales ===
Midnight Sun sold one million copies in its first week of publication.

=== Future ===
At Books-A-Million's virtual live event in August 2020, Meyer announced that she has plans for two more Twilight books. In 2024, an animated two-season adaptation of Midnight Sun was announced by Netflix.
