= The Twilight Saga (film series) =

Lionsgate media franchise

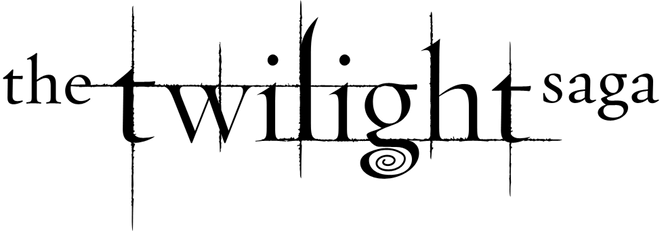
- Directed by: Catherine Hardwicke (1); Chris Weitz (2); David Slade (3); Bill Condon (4-5)
- Screenplay by: Melissa Rosenberg
- Based on: Twilight by Stephenie Meyer
- Produced by: Wyck Godfrey; Greg Mooradian (1); Mark Morgan (1); Karen Rosenfelt (2-5); Stephenie Meyer (4-5)
- Starring: Kristen Stewart; Robert Pattinson; Taylor Lautner (See cast)
- Cinematography: Elliot Davis (1); Javier Aguirresarobe (2-3); Guillermo Navarro (4-5)
- Edited by: Nancy Richardson (1, 3); Peter Lambert (2); Art Jones (3); Virginia Katz (4-5); Ian Slater (5)
- Music by: Carter Burwell (1, 4-5); Alexandre Desplat (2); Howard Shore (3)
- Production companies: Temple Hill Entertainment; Maverick Films/Imprint Entertainment (1-3); Sunswept Entertainment (2-5)
- Distributed by: Summit Entertainment (1-4); Lionsgate Films (5)
- Running time: 607 minutes (1-5, combined theatrical editions); 634 minutes (1-5, combined extended editions)
- Country: United States
- Language: English
- Budget: $401 million (5 films)
- Box office: $3.346 billion (5 films)

The Twilight Saga is a series of romantic vampire fantasy films based on the book series Twilight by Stephenie Meyer. The series has grossed over $3.36 billion worldwide. The first installment, Twilight, was released on November 21, 2008. The second installment, New Moon, followed on November 20, 2009. The third installment, Eclipse, was released on June 30, 2010. The fourth installment, Breaking Dawn – Part 1, was released on November 18, 2011, while the fifth and final installment, Breaking Dawn – Part 2, was released on November 16, 2012.

The series had been in development since 2004 at Paramount Pictures' MTV Films, during which time a screen adaptation of Twilight that differed significantly from the novel was written. Three years later, Summit Entertainment acquired the rights to the film. After Twilight grossed $35.7 million on its opening day, Summit Entertainment announced they would begin production on New Moon; they had acquired the rights to the remaining novels earlier that same month. Critics gave negative to mixed reviews of the film series, but they were positively received by fans of the books.

== Development ==
Twilight was in development for about three years at Paramount Pictures' MTV Films, during which time a film adaptation differing significantly from the novel was written. For example, the script transformed Bella into a star athlete. It was so different that Stephenie Meyer worried that she had made the wrong decision in selling the film rights to her novel. She said later, '"They could have put that [earlier] movie out, called it something else, and no one would have known it was Twilight!"

When Summit Entertainment reinvented itself as a full-service studio in April 2007, it acquired the rights, seeking to create a film franchise based on the book and its sequels. Erik Feig, President of Production at Summit Entertainment, guaranteed a close adaptation to the book. Meyer felt that Summit was open to letting her be a part of the film.

Catherine Hardwicke was hired to direct the film, and soon afterward, Melissa Rosenberg was hired to write the film. Rosenberg developed an outline by the end of August, then worked on the screenplay with Hardwicke the following month. "She was a great sounding board and had all sorts of brilliant ideas....I'd finish off scenes and send them to her, and get back her notes." Because of the impending WGA strike, Rosenberg worked full-time to finish the screenplay before October 31. In adapting the novel for the screen, she "had to condense a great deal", combining some characters and leaving others out. "[O]ur intent all along was to stay true to the book," Rosenberg explained, "and it has to do less with adapting it word for word and more with making sure the characters' arcs and emotional journeys are the same." Hardwicke suggested using voice over to convey the protagonist's internal dialogue, since the novel is told from Bella's point of view; and she sketched some of the storyboards during pre-production.

Hardwicke sought Meyer's feedback as she developed the movie; for example, the director phoned the author after changing a scene slightly. This surprised Meyer. "I've heard the stories...I know it's not normally like that when you adapt a book." Meyer, a natural pessimist, was waiting for the worst but, instead, called her experience in the book's film adaptation "the best I could have hoped for."

Originally scheduled for release in December 2008, Twilight was moved to a worldwide release of November 21, 2008, after Harry Potter and the Half-Blood Prince moved from a November 2008 release to being released in July 2009.

== Casting ==
Kristen Stewart was on the set of Adventureland when Hardwicke visited her for an informal screen test, which "captivated" the director. Hardwicke did not initially choose Robert Pattinson for the role of Edward Cullen; but, after an audition at her home with Stewart, he was selected. Robert Pattinson actually didn't enjoy playing his assigned character, Edward Cullen. Meyer allowed Pattinson to view a manuscript of the unfinished Midnight Sun, which chronicles the events in Twilight from Edward's point of view. Meyer was "excited" and "ecstatic" in response to the casting of the two main characters. She had expressed interest in having Emily Browning and Henry Cavill cast as Bella and Edward, respectively, prior to pre-production.

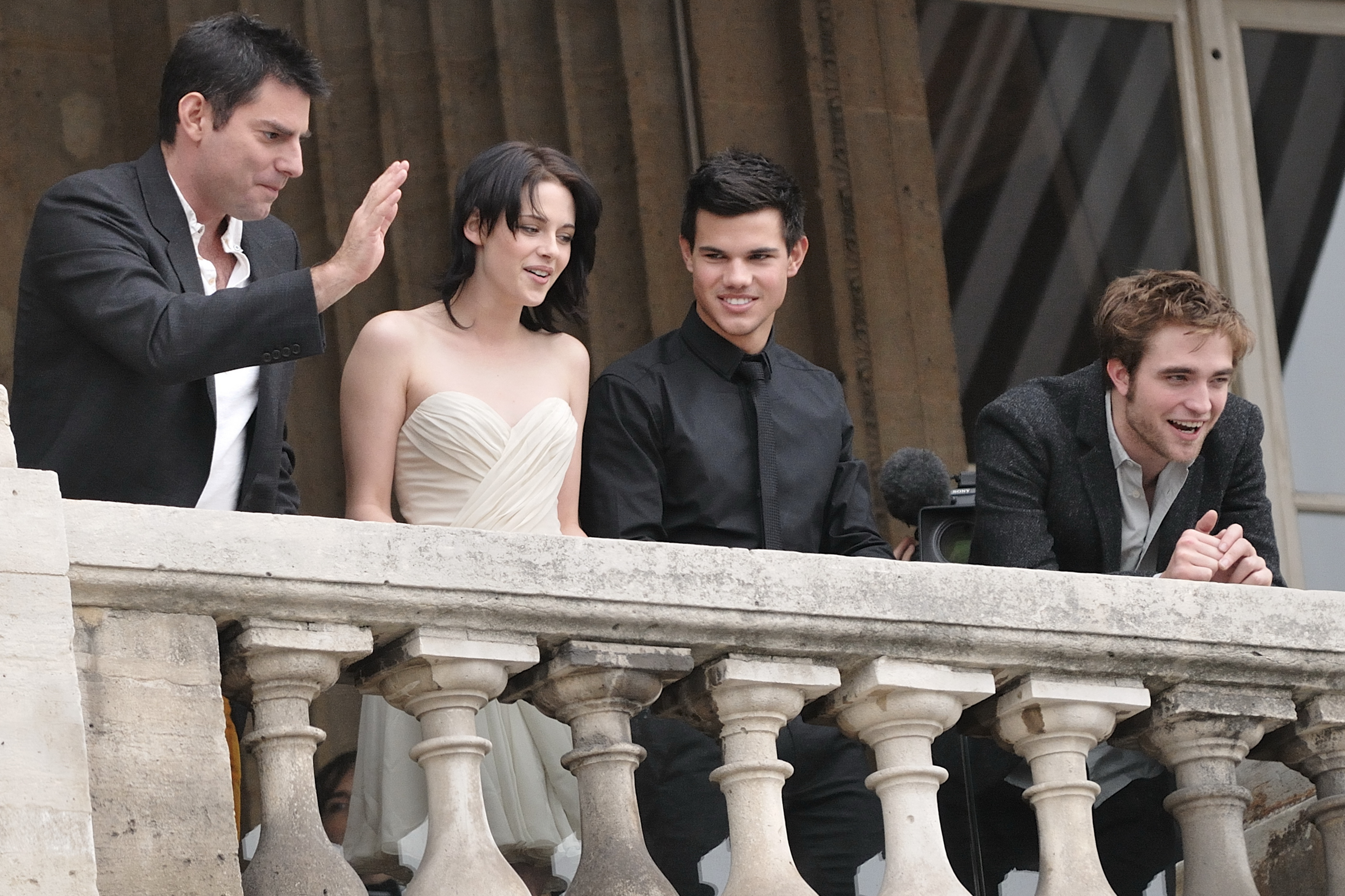
(Left to right) Director Chris Weitz, Kristen Stewart, Taylor Lautner and Robert Pattinson attending the photocall for New Moon on November 10, 2009, in Paris, France

Peter Facinelli was not originally cast as Carlisle Cullen: "[Hardwicke] liked [him], but there was another actor that the studio was pushing. For unknown reasons, that actor was not able to play the part, and Facinelli was selected in his place. The choice of Ashley Greene to portray Alice Cullen was criticized by some fans because Greene is 7 inches (18 cm) taller than her character as described in the novel. Meyer said that Rachael Leigh Cook resembled her vision of Alice. Nikki Reed, who portrayed Rosalie Hale, had previously worked with Hardwicke on the successful Thirteen (2003), which they co-wrote, and Lords of Dogtown (2005).

Kellan Lutz was in Africa, shooting the HBO miniseries Generation Kill, when the auditions for the character of Emmett Cullen were conducted. The role had already been cast by the time the HBO production ended in December 2007, but the selected actor "fell through." Lutz subsequently auditioned and was flown to Oregon, where Hardwicke personally chose him.

Rachelle Lefèvre wanted a role in the film because Hardwicke was director; she saw "the potential to explore a character, hopefully, over three films;" and she wanted to portray a vampire. "[She] thought that vampires were basically the best metaphor for human anxiety and questions about being alive." Christian Serratos initially auditioned for Jessica Stanley, but she "fell totally in love with Angela" after reading the books and took advantage of a later opportunity to audition for Angela Weber. The role of Jessica Stanley went to Anna Kendrick, who got the part after two mix-and-match auditions with various actors.

Because of major physical changes that occur in the character of Jacob Black between Twilight and New Moon, director Chris Weitz considered replacing Taylor Lautner in the sequel with an actor who could more accurately portray "the new, larger Jacob Black." Trying to keep the role, Lautner worked out extensively and put on 30 lbs. In January 2009, Weitz and Summit Entertainment announced that Lautner would continue as Jacob in The Twilight Saga: New Moon.

When they told me Rob was probably the one, I looked him up and thought, "Yeah, he can do a version of Edward. He's definitely got that vampire thing going on." And then, when I was on set and I got to watch him go from being Rob to shifting into being Edward and he actually looked like the Edward in my head, it was a really bizarre experience. [...] He really had it nailed.

— Twilight author Stephenie Meyer

In late March 2009, Summit Entertainment released a list of the actors who would be portraying the "wolf pack" alongside Lautner. The casting for the rest of the Quileute people was headed by casting director Rene Haynes, who has worked on films with large Native American casts, such as Dances with Wolves and Bury My Heart at Wounded Knee.

In mid-2009, it was announced that Bryce Dallas Howard would be replacing Rachelle Lefevre as Victoria for the third Twilight film, The Twilight Saga: Eclipse. Summit Entertainment attributed the change to scheduling conflicts. Lefevre said she was "stunned" and "greatly saddened" by the decision. Jodelle Ferland was cast as the newly turned vampire, Bree. Other new cast members for the third film include Xavier Samuel as Riley, Jack Huston as Royce King II, Catalina Sandino Moreno as Maria, Julia Jones as Leah Clearwater, and Booboo Stewart as Seth Clearwater.

== Production ==
Principal photography for Twilight took 44 days, after more than a week of rehearsals, and completed on May 2, 2008. Similar to her directorial debut Thirteen, Hardwicke opted for an extensive use of hand-held cinematography to make the film "feel real". Meyer visited the production set three times, and was consulted on different aspects of the story; she also has a brief cameo in the film. To make their bodily movements more elegant, and to get used to their characters' fighting styles, the cast playing vampires participated in rehearsals with a dance choreographer and observed the physicality of different panthera. Instead of shooting at Forks High School itself, scenes taking place at the school were filmed at Kalama High School and Madison High School. Other scenes were also filmed in St. Helens, Oregon, and Hardwicke conducted some reshooting in Pasadena, California, in August.

It is suggested that Edward drives a "shiny" and "silver" Volvo S60-R, a fast sleeper car that doesn't call attention to the Cullen family's wealth in the novel series. The film series partnered with Volvo to place a Volvo C30 in the 2008 Twilight film, feeling that the C30 better suited the persona of a 108-year-old vampire pretending to be a 17-year-old high school student. Volvo reported an increase in the sale of the C30 in the US market following the film's release, and helped change the perception of Volvo as a "cool" car in a younger generation of buyers. Volvo continued the cooperation through the series, placing a Volvo XC60 in New Moon and returning to the S60 in Breaking Dawn.

In early November 2008, Summit announced that they had obtained the rights to the remaining books in Stephenie Meyer's Twilight series: New Moon, Eclipse and Breaking Dawn. On November 22, 2008, one day after the theatrical release of Twilight, Summit confirmed that they would begin working on New Moon. Melissa Rosenberg had been working on adapting the novel prior to Twilight's release and handed in the draft for New Moon during Twilight's opening weekend in November 2008.

In early December 2008, it was announced that Twilight director Catherine Hardwicke would not be returning to direct the sequel. Hardwicke cited time restrictions as the reason behind her leaving the project. Instead, Chris Weitz, director of The Golden Compass and co-director of American Pie, was hired to direct The Twilight Saga: New Moon. Filming for New Moon began in Vancouver in late March 2009, and in Montepulciano, Italy, in late May 2009.

In early 2009, before the release of The Twilight Saga: New Moon, Summit confirmed that they would begin production on The Twilight Saga: Eclipse. Since Weitz would be in post-production for New Moon when The Twilight Saga: Eclipse began shooting, he would not be directing the third film. Instead, The Twilight Saga: Eclipse was taken on by director David Slade, with Melissa Rosenberg returning as screenwriter. Filming began on August 17, 2009 at Vancouver Film Studios and finished in late October, with post-production beginning early the following month. In April 2010, it was revealed that re-shoots of the film were needed. Slade, who previously said he would not be around for them, was seen, along with Stephenie Meyer, on set. The three main stars were also present.

Wyck Godfrey, producer of the previous films in the series, stated in mid-2009 that they had every intention to make the film version of Breaking Dawn. Following months of speculation and cast rumors, it was officially announced on April 28, 2010, that Academy Award winner Bill Condon, who directed Gods and Monsters and Dreamgirls, would direct Breaking Dawn; producing the film will be Wyck Godfrey, Karen Rosenfelt and author Stephenie Meyer. "I'm very excited to get the chance to bring the climax of this saga to life on-screen. As fans of the series know, this is a one-of-a-kind book – and we're hoping to create an equally unique cinematic experience," said Bill Condon. A November 18, 2011 release date was set for the first part, while the second was scheduled for release on November 16, 2012. Following that statement, on June 11, 2010, Summit officially confirmed that a two-part adaption of the fourth book would start production in the fall. With this announcement, it was made clear that all major actors, including the three lead roles, the Cullen family and Charlie Swan, would return for both parts. Bill Condon was also confirmed to direct both parts.

In order to keep the budget on both parts of Breaking Dawn reasonable, which would be substantially greater than the previous installments in the series, filming in Louisiana was also negotiated, providing larger tax credits for the studio.

== Films ==
The Twilight Saga films
Film	U.S. release date	Directed by	Screenplay by	Produced by
Twilight	November 21, 2008	Catherine Hardwicke	Melissa Rosenberg	Mark Morgan, Wyck Godfrey & Greg Mooradian
The Twilight Saga: New Moon	November 20, 2009	Chris Weitz	Melissa Rosenberg	Wyck Godfrey & Karen Rosenfelt
The Twilight Saga: Eclipse	June 30, 2010	David Slade	Melissa Rosenberg	Wyck Godfrey & Karen Rosenfelt
The Twilight Saga: Breaking Dawn – Part 1	November 18, 2011	Bill Condon	Melissa Rosenberg	Wyck Godfrey, Karen Rosenfelt & Stephenie Meyer
The Twilight Saga: Breaking Dawn – Part 2	November 16, 2012	Bill Condon	Melissa Rosenberg	Wyck Godfrey, Karen Rosenfelt & Stephenie Meyer

=== Twilight (2008) ===
Twilight was directed by Catherine Hardwicke and written by Melissa Rosenberg. It focuses on the development of a personal relationship between teenager Bella Swan (Kristen Stewart) and vampire Edward Cullen (Robert Pattinson), and the subsequent efforts of Edward and his family to keep Bella safe from a separate group of hostile vampires. Edward refuses to grant Bella's request to transform her into a vampire so that they can be together forever, arguing that she should have a normal human life.

The film was released theatrically starting on November 21, 2008. It grossed $35.7 million on its opening day, and has come to gross US$393.6 million worldwide. The DVD was released on March 21, 2009, and grossed an additional $238 million from sales. The Blu-ray disc edition of the film was released on March 21, 2009, in select locations, but was made more widely available at further retailers on May 5, 2009, grossing over $26 million; getting to a total of over $264 million in home media sales.

=== The Twilight Saga: New Moon (2009) ===
The Twilight Saga: New Moon was directed by Chris Weitz and written by Melissa Rosenberg. The film follows the Cullens' departure from Forks, and Bella Swan's fall into a deep depression. This depression persists until Bella develops a strong friendship with Jacob Black (Taylor Lautner). She consequently discovers that Jacob has unwillingly become a werewolf. Jacob and his tribe must protect Bella from Victoria, a vampire seeking to avenge the death of her mate by killing Bella. A misunderstanding occurs, and Edward Cullen believes Bella is dead. Edward decides to commit suicide in Volterra, Italy; but he is stopped by Bella, who is accompanied by Edward's sister, Alice. They meet with the Volturi, a powerful coven of vampires, and are released on the condition that Bella be turned into a vampire in the near future. Bella and Edward are reunited, and she and the Cullens return to Forks. Edward tells Bella that he will change her into a vampire if she agrees to marry him.

The film was released theatrically starting on November 20, 2009, and set numerous records. It was at the time the biggest advance-ticket seller on Fandango and held the biggest midnight opening in domestic (United States and Canada) box office history, grossing an estimated $26.3 million. Its sequel, The Twilight Saga: Eclipse, broke that record in June 2010, grossing $72.7 million on its opening day domestically, becoming the biggest single-day opening in domestic history. New Moon is the thirteenth highest opening weekend in domestic history with $142,839,137.

=== The Twilight Saga: Eclipse (2010) ===
The Twilight Saga: Eclipse was directed by David Slade and written by Melissa Rosenberg. The film follows Bella Swan as she develops awareness of the possible complications of marrying a vampire. Jacob Black and the rest of the wolves form a temporary alliance with the Cullens to battle Victoria and her army of newborn vampires to keep Bella safe. Jacob unsuccessfully tries to convince Bella to leave Edward and be with him instead. Edward proposes to Bella and she accepts it.

The film was released theatrically starting on June 30, 2010, and is the first Twilight film to be released in IMAX. It set a new record for biggest midnight opening in domestic (United States and Canada) in box office history, grossing an estimated $30 million in over 4,000 theaters. The previous record holder was the previous film in the series, The Twilight Saga: New Moon with $26.3 million in 3,514 theaters. The film then scored the biggest Wednesday opening in domestic history with $68,533,840 beating Transformers: Revenge of the Fallen's $62 million. The Twilight Saga: Eclipse has also become the film with the widest release ever, playing in over 4,416 theaters.

=== The Twilight Saga: Breaking Dawn (2011–2012) ===
==== Part 1 (2011) ====
The Twilight Saga: Breaking Dawn was directed by Bill Condon, and author Stephenie Meyer co-produced the film along with Karen Rosenfelt and Wyck Godfrey, with Melissa Rosenberg penning the script. The book's plot was split into two films, the first of which was released on November 18, 2011. The filming of Breaking Dawn began in November 2010.

The first part follows Bella and Edward as they get married and Bella becomes pregnant. They deal with her struggle of being pregnant and nearly dying because of her half-human, half-vampire child.

==== Part 2 (2012) ====
The Twilight Saga: Breaking Dawn – Part 2 was released on November 16, 2012. The second part of Breaking Dawn sees the climax of Bella and Edward's relationship. Bella must learn, as a newly transformed vampire, to use her special shield powers, as well as protect her half-human half-vampire daughter, Renesmee. The film also shows the final battle between The Cullens, along with vampires from the Denali Clan, and other vampire friends, as well as the wolves from the Quileute Tribe, against The Volturi.

== Release history ==
Release dates and formats of Twilight movies
Initial release date	Entry(ies)	Edition(s)	Release Type(s)	Ref.
November 21, 2008	Twilight	First release	Theatrical	
March 21, 2009	Twilight	First release	Home Media (DVD/Blu-ray)	
November 20, 2009	The Twilight Saga: New Moon	First release	Theatrical	
March 20, 2010	The Twilight Saga: New Moon	First release	Home Media (DVD)	
June 30, 2010	The Twilight Saga: Eclipse	First release	Theatrical (IMAX)	
November 18, 2011	The Twilight Saga: Breaking Dawn – Part 1	First release	Theatrical	
November 16, 2012	The Twilight Saga: Breaking Dawn – Part 2	First release	Theatrical	
November 5, 2013	All 5 entries	Twilight Forever: The Complete Saga (5th anniversary re-release)	Home Media (DVD/Blu-ray)	
October 17, 2023	All 5 entries	15th Anniversary Complete Collection Box Set	Home Media (DVD/Blu-ray/Digital purchase)	
November 15, 2023	All 5 entries	The Twilight Saga (Steelbook)	Home Media (4K Blu-ray)	
from September 7, 2025 to September 14, 2025	All 5 entries	Free Lionsgate Livestream	Home Media (YouTube livestream)	
October 29, 2025	Twilight	First book 20th anniversary re-release	Theatrical re-release	
October 30, 2025	The Twilight Saga: New Moon	First book 20th anniversary re-release	Theatrical re-release	
October 31, 2025	The Twilight Saga: Eclipse	First book 20th anniversary re-release	Theatrical re-release	
November 1, 2025	The Twilight Saga: Breaking Dawn – Part 1	First book 20th anniversary re-release	Theatrical re-release	
November 2, 2025	The Twilight Saga: Breaking Dawn – Part 2	First book 20th anniversary re-release	Theatrical re-release	

=== Future ===
In September 2016, Lionsgate co-chairman Patrick Wachsberger stated that a sequel was "a possibility", but would only go ahead if Stephenie Meyer wanted to do one.

On August 8, 2017, Variety reported that Lionsgate CEO Jon Feltheimer had interest in having spinoffs made for The Twilight Saga, and wanted to create a writers' room to explore the idea.

On April 19, 2023, Lionsgate Television announced that a television series based on the Twilight Saga franchise was in early development.

On November 26, 2023, Catherine Hardwicke went on The Happy Sad Confused podcast, hosted by Josh Horowitz, for the first film's 15th anniversary and discussed a possible pitch with Jacob Elordi and Jenna Ortega for the new Lionsgate reboot.

For the 20th anniversary of the original book release, Lionsgate and Fathom Entertainment re-released the five movies in theaters for five days from October 29, 2025 to November 2, 2025.

== Soundtracks ==
=== Twilight ===
Twilight: Original Motion Picture Soundtrack was chosen by music supervisor Alexandra Patsavas. The album was released on November 4, 2008, by Patsavas' Chop Shop label, in conjunction with Atlantic Records, and debuted at No. 1 on the Billboard 200, having sold about 165,000 copies in its first week of release, 29% of which were digital downloads. Twilight is the best-selling theatrical movie soundtrack in the United States since Chicago (2002). "Decode", by Paramore, was the first single released from the soundtrack. It premiered on Paramore's fan club site and Stephenie Meyer's official website on October 1, 2008. The song was certified Platinum in the U.S. on February 16, 2010, selling over 1,000,000 copies. It was also nominated for a Grammy Award in 2010 for Best Song Written for a Movie. "Go All the Way (Into the Twilight)", by Perry Farrell, was the second single released from the soundtrack. It premiered on Meyer's website on October 23, 2008.

Twilight: The Score was composed and orchestrated by Carter Burwell over a nine- to ten-week period, and was recorded and mixed in about two weeks in late September 2008. Burwell began the score with a "Love Theme" for Bella and Edward's relationship, a variation of which became "Bella's Lullaby" that Robert Pattinson plays in the film, and that is included on the Twilight Original Motion Picture Soundtrack. The original theme is featured throughout the film, and serves to "play the romance that drives the story". Another theme Burwell composed was a "Predator Theme", which opens the film, and is intended to play Edward's vampire nature. Other themes include a bass-line, drum beat and distorted guitar sound for the nomadic vampires, and a melody for the Cullen family. Twilight: The Score was released digitally on November 25, 2008, and in stores on December 9.

=== The Twilight Saga: New Moon ===
The Twilight Saga: New Moon (Original Motion Picture Soundtrack) had, once again, Alexandra Patsavas as music supervisor; while The Twilight Saga: New Moon (The Score), was composed by Alexandre Desplat. The movie's director, Chris Weitz, has a working relationship with Desplat, who scored one of his previous films, The Golden Compass (2007). The Twilight Saga: New Moon: Original Motion Picture Soundtrack was released on October 16, 2009 by Patsavas' Chop Shop label, in conjunction with Atlantic Records. The album debuted at No. 2 on the Billboard 200, later jumped to No. 1 with 153,000 copies sold. The Twilight Saga: New Moon: The Score was released on November 24, 2009.

=== The Twilight Saga: Eclipse ===
The Twilight Saga: Eclipse (Original Motion Picture Soundtrack) had, once again, Alexandra Patsavas as music supervisor. It was released on June 8, 2010, by Patsavas' Chop Shop label, in conjunction with Atlantic Records. The lead single from the soundtrack, "Neutron Star Collision (Love Is Forever)", performed by the British band Muse, was released on May 17, 2010. The soundtrack debuted at number two on the U.S. Billboard 200 albums chart with estimated sales of 144,000 copies.

The film's score, The Twilight Saga: Eclipse (The Score), was composed by Howard Shore, who composed the scores for The Lord of the Rings trilogy (2001–2003).

=== The Twilight Saga: Breaking Dawn – Part 1 ===
The Twilight Saga: Breaking Dawn – Part 1: (Original Motion Picture Soundtrack) saw the release of two singles: "A Thousand Years" by Christina Perri and "It Will Rain" by Bruno Mars. The former reached number thirty one and the latter of the two number three on the Billboard Hot 100.

== Reception ==
=== Box office performance ===
Twilight grossed over $7 million in ticket sales from midnight showings alone on November 21, 2008. It grossed $35.7 million on its opening day. For its opening weekend in the United States and Canada, Twilight accumulated $69.6 million from 3,419 theaters at an average of $20,368 per theater.

The film has made $192.7 million in the United States and Canada, and a further $200.8 million in international territories for a total of $393.6 million worldwide.

The film was released on DVD in North America on March 21, 2009, through midnight release parties, and sold over 3 million units in its first day. It has continued to sell units, totaling as of July 2012, making $201,323,629.

The Twilight Saga: New Moon set records for advance ticket sales, causing some theaters to add additional showings. The film set records as the biggest midnight opening in domestic (United States and Canada) box office history, grossing an estimated $26.3 million in 3,514 theatres, before expanding to 4,024 theaters. The record was previously held by Harry Potter and the Half-Blood Prince, which grossed $22.2 million domestically during its midnight premiere. The film grossed $72.7 million on its opening day domestically, becoming the biggest single-day opening in domestic history, beating The Dark Knight's $67.2 million. This opening strongly contributed to another record: the first time that the top ten films at the domestic box office had a combined gross of over $100 million in a single day.

The opening weekend of The Twilight Saga: New Moon is the ninth-highest opening weekend in domestic history with $142,839,137. The film also has the sixth highest worldwide opening weekend with $274.9 million total.

Film	Release date	Budget	Box office revenue			Box office ranking	
Film	Release date	Budget	North America	Other territories	Worldwide	All time North America	All time worldwide
Twilight	November 21, 2008	$37,000,000	$192,769,854	$214,417,861	$407,187,715	#244 #400^{(A)}	#334
New Moon	November 20, 2009	$50,000,000	$296,623,634	$413,087,374	$709,711,008	#105 #207^{(A)}	#136
Twilight / New Moon (combo/one-night-only)	June 29, 2010		$2,385,237		$2,385,237	#7188	
Eclipse	June 30, 2010	$68,000,000	$300,531,751	$397,959,596	$698,491,347	#103 #208^{(A)}	#143
Breaking Dawn – Part 1	November 18, 2011	$110,000,000	$281,287,133	$430,918,723	$712,205,856	#120 #238^{(A)}	#135
Breaking Dawn – Part 2	November 16, 2012	$136,000,000	$292,324,737	$537,422,083	$829,746,820	#112 #236^{(A)}	#90
Total		$401,000,000	$1,365,922,346	$1,994,805,637	$3,359,727,983		
List indicator^{(A)} indicates the adjusted totals based on current ticket prices (calculated by Box Office Mojo).

=== Critical response ===
While The Twilight Saga has been successful at the box office, critical reception of the films was mixed.

New York Press critic Armond White called Twilight "a genuine pop classic", and praised Hardwicke for turning "Meyer's book series into a Brontë-esque vision". USA Today gave the film two out of four stars and Claudia Puig wrote: "Meyer is said to have been involved in the production of Twilight, but her novel was substantially more absorbing than the unintentionally funny and quickly forgettable film."

Robert Ignizio of the Cleveland Scene described The Twilight Saga: New Moon as an "entertaining fantasy", and noted that it "has a stronger visual look [than Twilight] and does a better job with its action scenes while still keeping the focus on the central love triangle." Michael O'Sullivan of The Washington Post gave the film two and half stars out of four, praised Kristen Stewart's performance in the film and wrote: "Despite melodrama that, at times, is enough to induce diabetes, there's enough wolf whistle in this sexy, scary romp to please anyone." The Seattle Post-Intelligencer gave the film a "B" grading and said, "the movie looks tremendous, the dialogue works, there are numerous well placed jokes, the acting is on point." Mick LaSalle from the San Francisco Chronicle responded with a more mixed review, stating, "[E]xpect this film to satisfy its fans. Everybody else, get ready for a bizarre soap opera/pageant, consisting of a succession of static scenes with characters loping into the frame to announce exactly what they're thinking." Roger Ebert gave the film one star out of four and said that it "takes the tepid achievement of Twilight, guts it, and leaves it for undead." The release of the movie has also inspired feminist criticism, with Owen Gleiberman of Entertainment Weekly making light of the claim that Edward Cullen is little better than a stalker. In any case, the influx of female viewers into the theaters indicates the increasing importance of the female demographic in dictating Hollywood's tastes.

The Hollywood Reporter posted a positive review of The Twilight Saga: Eclipse, saying the film "nails it". Variety reports that the film "finally feels more like the blockbuster this top-earning franchise deserves". One review stated the film was the best in The Twilight Saga so far, acknowledging that, "The person who should be worried is Bill Condon, the director tapped for the two-part finale, Breaking Dawn. He's got a real challenge to make movies as good as Eclipse." A.O. Scott of The New York Times praised David Slade's ability to make an entertaining film, calling it funny and better than its predecessors, but pointed out the acting hasn't improved much.

A more negative review said that while "Eclipse restores some of the energy New Moon zapped out of the franchise and has enough quality performances to keep it involving", the film "isn't quite the adrenaline-charged game-changer for love story haters that its marketing might lead you to believe. The majority of the 'action' remains protracted and not especially scintillating should-we-or-shouldn't-we conversations between the central triangle." Roger Ebert of the Chicago Sun Times gave the film a more positive review than for the first two films in the saga, but still felt the movie was a constant, unclever conversation between the three main characters. He criticized the "gazes" both Edward and Jacob give Bella throughout the movie, and noted that the mountain range that appears in the film looks "like landscapes painted by that guy on TV who shows you how to paint stuff like that." He also predicted that a lack of understanding for the film series in general would not bode well with the audience, stating: "I doubt anyone not intimately familiar with the earlier installments could make head or tails of the opening scenes." He gave the film two stars out of four.

Breaking Dawn – Part 1 received mostly negative reviews from critics. Review aggregator Rotten Tomatoes reports that 25% of critics (of the 207 counted reviews) gave the film a positive review, and the site's consensus reads: "Slow, joyless and loaded with unintentionally humorous moments, Breaking Dawn Part 1 may satisfy the Twilight faithful, but it's strictly for fans of the franchise". Part 2 had a mixed critical reception but was much more favorable than Part 1. Richard Roeper said that "The fifth and final entry in the historically successful Twilight franchise is the most self-aware and in some ways the most entertaining", giving it a grade C+.

Film	Rotten Tomatoes	Metacritic	CinemaScore
Twilight	49% (5.4/10 average rating) (200 reviews)	56 (38 reviews)	A−
The Twilight Saga: New Moon	29% (4.8/10 average rating) (231 reviews)	44 (32 reviews)	A−
The Twilight Saga: Eclipse	47% (5.5/10 average rating) (256 reviews)	58 (38 reviews)	A
The Twilight Saga: Breaking Dawn – Part 1	25% (4.4/10 average rating) (212 reviews)	45 (36 reviews)	B+
The Twilight Saga: Breaking Dawn – Part 2	49% (5.3/10 average rating) (200 reviews)	52 (31 reviews)	A

=== Home media sales ===
List indicator

- ^{(B)} indicates the yearly rank based on the number of DVDs sold during the year released (calculated by The Numbers).

Film	DVD release date	Revenue (millions)	Rank^{(B)}	Units sold	Reference
Twilight	March 21, 2009	$203	#1	13,921,700	
The Twilight Saga: New Moon	March 20, 2010	$222	#3	11,163,968	
The Twilight Saga: Eclipse	December 4, 2010	$214	#5	12,110,823	
The Twilight Saga: Breaking Dawn – Part 1	February 11, 2012	$144	#5	7,516,651	
The Twilight Saga: Breaking Dawn – Part 2	March 2, 2013	$103	#4	6,992,227	
Total		$886		51,705,369	

== Twilight in popular culture ==
In 2010, a parody film, Vampires Suck, starring Jenn Proske, Matt Lanter, and Chris Riggi, was released, its material largely based on Twilight and its sequel, The Twilight Saga: New Moon. Though the film was a critical failure, with Rotten Tomatoes critics giving it an approval rating of only 4%, it was a financial success, opening at number one in the United States and grossing more than $80,000,000 worldwide, against a $20,000,000 budget. In 2012, another parody film, Breaking Wind, featuring a cast of unknown actors, was released straight to DVD by Lionsgate Home Entertainment.

In 2010, the Teletoon original film My Babysitter's a Vampire parodied the first three Twilight films as the Dusk trilogy. There is a side plot that follows the main characters to a fan held premiere of Dusk III: Unbitten. There is a Dusk fan club and the fans are called Duskers. There are contentious references to the parodied franchise through its televised adaptation.

The successful animated film Hotel Transylvania briefly parodied the Twilight Saga, namely the scene in which Edward reveals his vampirism to Bella in the woods near Forks High School. The scene, which lasts only a few seconds, can be seen playing on an airplane TV as Count Dracula attempts to convince Jonathan to forgive him and come back to Hotel Transylvania.

In 2019, Russian figure skater Alena Kostornaia used music from the Twilight and New Moon soundtracks for her free program. With this program, she later became the European champion, and was the favourite for the world title before the championship's cancellation in March 2020 due to the COVID-19 pandemic.

A Lego set based on the Cullen house was released in February 2025. The set was designed as a part of Lego Ideas.

Following in September 2025, the original Twilight book celebrated its 20th anniversary. In honor of its birthday, Stephanie Meyer, came out with a collectors deluxe re-publish of the honorary series. Featuring a hard-cover single Twilight book as well as a whole hard-cover series featuring each book recreating an important moment within the series. Many book retailers such as Barnes and Noble carry both the single special edition book and the collectors series.
