= Bella Swan =

Fictional character in the Twilight series

- Twilight character
- Bella Swan as portrayed by Kristen Stewart in The Twilight Saga: New Moon
- First appearance: Twilight
- Last appearance: Midnight Sun
- Created by: Stephenie Meyer
- Portrayed by: Kristen Stewart

In-universe information
- Nicknames: Bella; Bells; Bell; Vampire girl (by Emily Young & Embry Call); Arizona (by Mike Newton in films)
- Species: Human (Twilight, New Moon, Eclipse, Breaking Dawn Parts 1 & 2) (formerly); Vampire (Breaking Dawn Part 2) (subsequently)
- Gender: Female
- Occupation: Student (Twilight to Eclipse); Employee at Newton's Olympic Outfitters (New Moon and Eclipse, books only)
- Family: Geoffrey Swan (paternal grandfather, deceased); Helen Swan (paternal grandmother, deceased); Beaufort Higginbotham (maternal grandfather, deceased); Marie Higginbotham (maternal grandmother, deceased); Charlie Swan (father); Renée Swan (mother); Phil Dwyer (stepfather; in her human form); Edward Masen, Sr. (father-in-law, deceased); Elizabeth Masen (mother-in-law, deceased); Carlisle Cullen (adoptive father-in-law); Esme Cullen (adoptive mother-in-law); Emmett Cullen and Jasper Hale (adoptive brothers-in-law); Alice Cullen and Rosalie Hale (adoptive sisters-in-law); Jacob Black (best friend and future son-in-law)
- Spouse: Edward Cullen
- Children: Renesmee Cullen
- Nationality: American

Isabella "Bella" Marie Cullen (née Swan) is the protagonist character of the Twilight book series by Stephenie Meyer. She is initially an ordinary teenage girl, but during the series, Bella falls in love and marries a vampire Edward Cullen, with whom she has a human-vampire hybrid daughter, Renesmee Cullen. The Twilight series, consisting of the novels Twilight, New Moon, Eclipse, and Breaking Dawn, is primarily narrated from Bella's point of view. In The Twilight Saga film series, Bella is portrayed by actress Kristen Stewart.

In Twilight, 17-year-old Bella moves to her father's home in Forks, Washington, meets the mysterious Cullen family, and falls in love with seemingly teenage Edward Cullen. However, she soon discovers that the Cullen family is a coven of "vegetarian" vampires, living on animal rather than human blood. Bella expresses a desire to become a vampire herself, but Edward refuses to turn her. In the second novel, New Moon, Edward and the other Cullens leave Forks in an effort to keep now-18-year-old human Bella safe from the vampire world. Jacob Black, a member of the Quileute tribe who is also a shape-shifter taking a werewolf form, comforts the distraught and severely depressed Bella. She comes to care deeply for Jacob, though less than she loves Edward. At the end of Eclipse, she becomes engaged to Edward, and they marry in Breaking Dawn, one month prior to her 19th birthday. On their honeymoon, she becomes pregnant after having sex with Edward, and, due to the peculiar nature of her half-vampire baby, Bella nearly dies giving birth to their daughter, Renesmee. Afraid of losing her again, Edward turns Bella into a vampire to save her.

== Concept and creation ==
The premise for both Bella and the Twilight series originated in a dream Stephenie Meyer had in which an "average girl" and a "fantastically beautiful, sparkly... vampire... were having an intense conversation in a meadow in the woods." In this dream, the pair "were discussing the difficulties inherent in the facts that... they were falling in love with each other while... the vampire was particularly attracted to the scent of her blood, and was having a difficult time restraining himself from killing her."

Meyer's original characters were unnamed; she took to calling the characters, who would later become Edward and Bella, "he" and "she" for the purpose of convenience as she "didn't want to lose the dream." Meyer explained that the name "Isabella" was decided upon because "after spending so much time with [the character], I loved her like a daughter. ... Inspired by that love, I gave her the name I was saving for my daughter,... Isabella."

Bella's positive reception at her new school in Forks, particularly her popularity with male characters, was modelled after Meyer's real life move from high school to college. Meyer has said that there are similarities between Bella and the title character of Charlotte Brontë's Jane Eyre, a novel which she has cited as an influence on the Twilight series.

== Appearances ==
=== Twilight ===
Bella, who first appears in Twilight, is a 17-year-old human girl who moves from her mother's home in Phoenix, Arizona, to live with her father, Charlie Swan, a police chief, in her birthplace of Forks, Washington. There, she is enrolled at Forks High School, where she becomes intrigued by a 17-year-old vampire student, Edward Cullen, and his siblings. When Edward saves her life, she is determined to find out what Edward Cullen is and how he saved her with his super-human qualities. Later, Bella learns from Jacob Black that Quileute legends say the Cullen family are Cold Ones, or vampires. Edward eventually admits that he is a vampire, though his family has what they call a "vegetarian" diet, only hunting animals. Edward constantly warns Bella against being with him, perceiving her life to be at constant risk because her blood's scent is more seductive to him than any other human he has ever met, due to her being his 'singer'. Cantante is the Italian expression that the Volturi use to describe a human whose blood particularly appeals to a certain vampire in an extreme sense. "Cantante" is the Italian word for "singer", denoting when the blood of the human sings for the vampire. Bella's love and confidence in Edward's restraint are such that his warnings go unheeded. While playing baseball with the Cullen family, she becomes the target of a sadistic vampire, James. Edward saves Bella from James' predation, though Edward is still unwilling to change Bella into a vampire himself.

=== New Moon ===
New Moon begins on Bella's 18th birthday. She has a dream where she looks like her late grandmother while her vampire boyfriend, Edward Cullen, is still young. During a birthday celebration at the Cullen residence, Bella gets a small paper cut while unwrapping a present. Edward's brother, Jasper, instinctively thirsting for her blood, lunges for Bella, but Edward and Emmett restrain him. In a misguided attempt to protect Bella, Edward moves away with his family. Edward's departure results in Bella falling into a deep depression and isolation lasting months.

Charlie, concerned about Bella, wants her to live with her mother in Jacksonville, hoping a new environment will help with her depression. In an effort to stay in Forks, Bella begins seeing her old friends and attends a frightening movie with Jessica. While there, she carelessly approaches a group of dangerous-looking bikers gathered outside a bar; she discovers she can hear Edward's voice when she gets into trouble. Desperate to hear his voice again, Bella continually seeks out danger and convinces her friend Jacob Black to repair two old motorcycles and teach her how to ride them. Their friendship gradually deepens and Jacob admits his romantic feelings for Bella, though she does not reciprocate them. This results in Jacob isolating himself from Bella. When the vampire Laurent returns to Forks, he tries to attack Bella. She is saved by a pack of giant wolves. Later, Bella learns that Jacob and other tribe members are shape-shifters who phase into wolf form to protect humans from vampires. Bella also discovers that Victoria has also returned to Forks, seeking to kill Edward's mate, Bella to avenge her vampire mate, James' death.

To hear Edward's voice again, Bella attempts cliff jumping and nearly drowns, but Jacob rescues her. Alice returns to Forks after having a vision that Bella jumped off a cliff and has died, only to discover that Bella is alive. After Harry Clearwater died from a heart attack, her vision misread his funeral for Bella's. Edward, believing Bella has committed suicide, travels to Volterra, Italy, to request the Volturi to destroy him, though they refuse his request.

Alice and Bella follow Edward to Italy, barely in time prevent him from showing himself in daylight to humans, an act that would result in his execution. The trio is taken to the Volturi. Because Bella knows about vampires, the Volturi would either kill her or have her become a vampire. Alice shows Aro, the main leader of the Volturi, a vision she had of Bella as a vampire, and they are free to leave and are given a strict warning that there will be consequences if Bella remains human.

Upon returning home, Edward tells Bella that he never stopped loving her and only left Forks to protect her. Edward promises never to leave Bella again. Edward still opposes Bella becoming a vampire and intends to fool the Volturi. Intent on becoming an immortal, Bella asks the Cullens to vote on her fate. Only Rosalie and Edward oppose it. Later, Jacob reminds Edward about the treaty, and biting any human will nullify it. Bella insists it is her choice. Edward later agrees he will change her if she marries him.

=== Eclipse ===
Eclipse continues the paranormality of 18-year-old human Bella and the vampire Edward's relationship. Edward is reluctant to change Bella into a vampire, believing that becoming a vampire will destroy her soul. Bella agrees to marry Edward on the condition that he will make love to her while she is still human and then turn her into a vampire. Edward initially declines, saying that he could easily lose control and unintentionally kill her. He reminds Bella that he is from another era, where relationships had fewer complications and couples remained celibate until marriage.

The plot is driven by the machinations of the vampire Victoria, who first encountered Bella and the Cullens during the first novel, Twilight. Victoria, seeking to avenge the death of her lover James, hunts Bella while building a new vampire army to wipe out the Cullen coven. To combat this threat, a reluctant truce is struck between the Cullens, and the shape-shifting wolf pack led by Sam Uley. Jacob Black pits himself against Edward as a love interest for Bella, but she considers him as a friend. Despite her love for Edward, she shares a kiss with Jacob and realizes she loves him, too, but loves Edward more. Bella acknowledges that Edward is the most important person in her life. After Victoria is killed and Edward has formally proposed, Bella must now tell her father, Charlie, knowing he will oppose her marrying Edward.

=== Breaking Dawn ===
==== Part 1 ====
Breaking Dawn begins with the wedding of human Bella and vampire, Edward, at the Cullen residence. They spend their honeymoon on Isle Esme, a small island off the coast of Rio de Janeiro, Brazil the Cullens own. Their lovemaking sparks a conflict between the newlyweds: Edward is horrified that he has bruised Bella, but she insists she is fine and wants Edward to make love to her again. Although he vows not to do so again while she is still human, he eventually helps her fulfill her wish for being a vampire.

Two weeks into their honeymoon, Bella thinks she may be pregnant, even though it is believed that a vampire cannot father a child. Edward and Bella return to Forks. Carlisle, a doctor, confirms that Bella is indeed pregnant. Her health quickly deteriorates as the baby's growth accelerates. Edward wants the pregnancy terminated to save Bella. Bella refuses, and asks her sister-in-law, Rosalie, to intervene as her advocate and protector. Edward comes to love the baby after hearing its thoughts and learns it loves Bella and does not mean to harm her.

Bella goes into labor and Edward performs an emergency cesarean to deliver their daughter, Renesmee. As Bella lies, presumably dying, Edward repeatedly injects his venom into Bella's body. During Bella's transformation into a vampire and recovery, Jacob imprints —an involuntary process in which a shape-shifter finds his soulmate— on Edward and Bella's baby, Renesmee.

==== Part 2 ====
When Bella completes her transformation into a vampire, she goes on a hunting trip with Edward. On the trip, she meets hunters. After mastering her self-control, Edward brings her to her daughter. Their happiness is cut short when the Cullens' vampire cousin, Irina, mistakes Renesmee for an immortal child (a forbidden creation in the vampire world), she reports it to the Volturi. Alice foresees the Volturi arriving to destroy the Cullen coven for the alleged transgression. The Cullens gather vampire witnesses to verify Renesmee's mortality, only to realize later the Volturi always intended to destroy their coven and recruit Alice for her foresight ability. Meanwhile, Bella learns that she is a "shield" and can block others' mental thoughts and senses. She can also project a protective barrier around others. Edward and Bella stand with the other Cullens and their allies to convince the Volturi that Renesmee is not an immortal child or poses a threat to their existence. Once the Volturi are impelled to leave or else face their own destruction as Alice has foreseen, Edward, Bella, Renesmee, and the other Cullens can finally live their lives in peace.

=== Midnight Sun ===
This is a retelling of the events of Twilight from Edward Cullen's perspective, which sheds more light on Bella's character. From Bella's perspective in Twilight, she is incredibly average. However, from Edward's perspective, all the things that make Bella unusual and different from her peers are made obvious. Bella is shown to possess uncanny intelligence and is able to piece together that the Cullens are vampires with little help from Jacob Black.

She is portrayed with courage in the face of absolute danger. With Edward, she trusts and loves him unconditionally, and does not harbor the fear that an average person normally should or would have. Instead, her deep compassion and love for Edward and her friends and family continue to take precedence in all her actions.

Bella also shows her courage, selflessness, and intelligence multiple times by outwitting Alice and Jasper and deciding to go alone to meet the vampire James in an attempt to save her mother. She is observed by Edward to repeatedly be almost motherly in the way that she cares for her parents and those around her, putting their feelings and needs before her own. This depth of compassion and sharp intuition seen by Edward is not as apparent in the original Twilight story, due to Bella's own perspective of herself being from a place of lower self-esteem. Bella tends to be quite hard on herself, unable to see the good nature, compassion, and actual physical beauty that Edward sees in her.

Bella also shows herself to be insatiably curious. She is always wanting to know more about anything that interests her and is an avid reader of fiction books. This fascination and intense curiosity are especially prevalent with Edward, much to his irritation as he is just as curious about her. Neither of them finds themselves particularly interesting, and continuously are trying to find out more about the other while sharing little unprompted about themselves, though Bella seems to win more in this regard as she is good at prying things out of Edward and stubbornly getting what she wants from him, just as he is continuously shown to give in to her demands and questions. In addition, while Edward is continuously boggled by the mind he can't read—and her reactions which are so unlike any other human he's known—Bella shows a natural intuition in stride with her curiosity to ask exactly what Edward doesn't want to share. In the aftermath, Renesmee admits that her parents have found each other but she tells Bella of how Edward proposed to her sometime after they graduate from high school and Bella told her daughter that Renesmee's maternal grandparents' early experience of marriage and divorce and remarriage by the time Renesmee reached 18, she will understand what early marriage looks like for her and Jacob just like Edward and Bella were as well as Charlie and Renée

== Characterization ==
=== Physical appearance ===
Bella is described as being petite, with a height of roughly 5'4", and a very translucent, pale complexion. She has thick, long, brown hair, with a wide forehead, and a widow's peak. Her eyes are described as being "chocolate brown" and widely spaced. She has a small, thin nose, prominent cheekbones, lips a bit too full for her slim jawline, and thin eyebrows that are straighter than they are arched. Her fingernails are described as stubby from being bitten down. There are several references to Bella's hair having a red tinge to it which is only very visible in the sunlight; in overcast and dimly lit conditions, it appears browner.

The scent of her O-positive blood is exceptionally appealing to vampires. In The Short Second Life of Bree Tanner, Bree describes it as "the sweetest scent she'd ever smelled.” though it is much stronger for Edward Cullen.

As for distinguishing features, Bella has a small crescent-shaped scar on her hand where she was bitten by James, a tracker vampire, in Twilight. The scar is described as being pale, always a few degrees colder than the rest of her body, and it shines like a vampire's skin when exposed to the sunlight. After Bella is changed into a vampire by Edward, she becomes extremely beautiful with even paler skin, straight waist-length hair, and crimson red eyes that eventually turn gold after months of drinking animal blood. Her features are also heightened and perfected by the transformation.

Bella wears plain shirts, jeans, and sneakers everywhere she goes, as she lacks care in her appearance during the beginning of The Twilight Saga. However, she is shown to take more care in looking better for Edward the more she falls in love with him. In Midnight Sun, Edward listens from a tree branch outside her window as Bella frantically searches through her wardrobe in search of something nice to wear for the day he plans on taking her to the meadow.

In the movie, Twilight, these changes are also shown gradually in the clothing she chooses from day to day. She wears plain clothes that look comfortable and easy to live in, with not much care for her appearance in earlier scenes. After beginning to have feelings for Edward Cullen, Bella is shown to dress in more stylish or eye-catching clothing, having a deeper V-neck shirt with embroidery in a cafeteria scene where she keeps sneaking glances at Edward.

== Personality ==
Bella is described as being warm, kind, compassionate, selfless, caring and good. She often views herself in a negative light, depicting herself as clumsy, having a weak constitution, and being undeserving of Edward or selfish and hazardous to those around her.

Bella is also described as reclusive, reticent, sensitive to the thoughts and feelings of others and considerate of how things affect them. She can therefore appear quiet or shy to those who do not know her well and will prefer to listen over talking.

Her love for the Cullen family is deep and devoted, as well as that for her husband, Edward, her daughter, Renesmee, her parents, Charlie and Renée, and her friend, Jacob Black. She has a tendency to underestimate the people around her mainly because of her concerns for their safety.

Bella had a strong protective instinct and often expresses a desire to place herself in front of others to face any oncoming danger. Such as when she offered her own life in place of Edward's to satisfy the Volturi, and again wishing to be present in the battle against the newborn army, even cutting herself to draw blood and distract vampires who were attacking Edward and Seth. Bella refused to condemn her unborn child Renesmee and fully intended to give her own life in order to sustain her daughter should it have come to it.

Having learned to take care of her mother over the years Bella developed into a more mature and responsible person, which made it difficult to fit in with her own age group. She mostly prefers to spend her free time reading classics from school.

When it comes to fashion, Bella is not traditionally feminine. She hates dressing up, saying that makeup "is a pain" and that she feels uncomfortable in impractical, elegant clothes; however, Alice does not care what Bella thinks and continues to persuade her to dress up and look glamorous. She is not materialistic and does not like spending money on luxurious items, telling Edward in New Moon "not to spend a dime on [her] birthday," and those fast cars are unnecessary, saying that Edward gave her himself and anything else he gives her would throw their relationship off balance. She hates being singled out and does not like her birthday being celebrated. She also has very negative views on teen marriage due to her parents' early experience but learns to overcome them later.

She is an extremely private person who keeps her thoughts and feelings to herself and hates when someone tries to understand her, which is thought to be why Edward is unable to hear her thoughts. This characteristic manifests itself in the form of her shield, a mental power that prevents any form of mental invasion or attack.

Bella tends to daydream, at times getting lost in her own thoughts, but contemplative and observant when the need calls for it. She is also known to be incredibly stubborn, especially regarding her determination to become a vampire in order to be with Edward forever. Bella is also said to possess poor acting skills. Ironically, she demonstrates good acting ability in Twilight when she makes her father believe that she has dumped Edward and is leaving Forks.

As a human Bella has a very reserved body language and a habit of biting her lip, which she shares with Kristen Stewart. She knits together her eyebrows when feeling strong emotions such as nervousness. As a human, Bella easily fainted at the sight of blood, though it changes after she became a vampire. Bella is also shown in Breaking Dawn, to have a good mood climate, and is able to run away from the smell of human blood when she goes on her first hunting trip as a vampire.

Bella has a sarcastic sense of humor, and is able to engage often in banter and verbal sparring with Edward, Jacob, Emmett, Quil or Embry especially when she is angered or frustrated at their behaviour. She is forgiving by nature and unable to hold a grudge.

Bella is shown to be courageous at times, as despite being human and therefore arguably one of the most physically fragile characters in the series, she is able to block painful thoughts and memories (hence her unique vampire ability), and tends to meet life threatening danger head on, even though she may find herself afraid later.

Her overpowering love for Edward causes her to place his welfare before herself and nearly everybody and everything else, several 'selfish' tendencies have been known to emerge (as when she asked Edward to stay with her instead of fighting vampires in Eclipse). Meyer has stated that Bella's "tragic flaw" in Eclipse is her lack of self-knowledge. This is most obviously illustrated in her consistent denial of any romantic feelings for Jacob Black, despite the fact that she later realizes that she is, indeed, in love with him.

Bella is also a very bad liar, except to herself. According to Eclipse, Jacob and Edward say that she's a terrible liar. Besides, she also admits this throughout the whole saga, though she seemingly manages to lie to herself about her romantic feelings for Jacob.

In contrary to her low profile demeanor, Bella, according to Edward in Midnight Sun, has no sense of fear when she finds out Edward is a vampire. Instead of running away, as she should have, she decides to ask many questions with extreme curiosity. This makes Edward believe that it is not bad luck that follows her around, but that she has no sense of self-preservation. Bella is book-smart but is lacking in common sense. She can be considered impractical at times.

She hates anything cold and wet, even snow, which is why she initially hated to live in Forks. However, after meeting Edward, she found the town much more comfortable, even calling it "home". As a vampire, she also dislikes the idea of feeding on humans, but is glad to have found the strength she needed to protect her loved ones.

Bella inherited her mother's high perceptiveness as she was able to guess Edward was a mind reader, the first human to do so. However, she was not able to guess that Edward was in love with her.

After being turned into a vampire, she describes having a much clearer view of the world. She is also very self-controlled, being able to ignore the scent of human blood on her first hunting trip. Bella's private mind that was able to repel some vampires' mental abilities while she was human evolved after she became a vampire; her skill strengthened, allowing her to shield herself and those around her from other vampires' mental gifts. By the end of Breaking Dawn, she is able to cast the shield away from herself. She is also described by Edward as "very graceful", even for a vampire, in comparison to her earlier clumsiness as a human.

=== Film portrayal ===
In the film adaptations, Bella is portrayed by actress Kristen Stewart. Meyer stated that she was "very excited" to see Stewart play the part and that she was "thrilled to have a Bella who has practice [in a vast array of film genres]", since, according to Meyer, Twilight has moments that fit into many genres. Stewart wears contact lenses in the films in order to achieve a chocolate brown eye color as described in the books.

== Reception ==
Bella has received a generally negative reception from critics. Publishers Weekly states that, after her transformation into a vampire, "it's almost impossible to identify with her" in Breaking Dawn. Lilah Lohr of the Chicago Tribune compares Bella's character to the story of the Quileute wolves and describes it as "less satisfying." During Twilight, Kirkus Reviews stated that "Bella's appeal is based on magic rather than character", but that her and Edward's "portrayal of dangerous lovers hits the spot". In the review of New Moon, Kirkus Reviews said that Bella's personality was "flat and obsessive". Laura Miller of salon.com said, in regards to Edward and Bella, "neither of them has much personality to speak of." Entertainment Weekly's Jennifer Reese, in her review of Breaking Dawn noted, in regard to Bella, "You may wish she had loftier goals and a mind of her own, but these are fairy tales, and as a steadfast lover in the Disney Princess mold, Bella has a certain saccharine appeal", and that during Bella's pregnancy "she is not only hard to identify with but positively horrifying, especially while guzzling human blood to nourish the infant." The Washington Post journalist Elizabeth Hand noted how Bella was often described as breakable and that "Edward's habit of constantly pulling her onto his lap or having her ride on his back further emphasize her childlike qualities", continuing to write that "the overall effect is a weird infantilization that has repellent overtones to an adult reader and hardly seems like an admirable model to foist upon our daughters (or sons)." Gina Dalfonzo, in an article posted on the National Review website, calls Bella "self-deprecating" before her transformation into a vampire, and afterwards she is "insufferably vain". Dalfonzo also states that Bella gets what she wants and discovers her worth "by giving up her identity and throwing away nearly everything in life that matters."
