= Twilight (novel series) =

Series of vampire romance novels by Stephenie Meyer

- The six covers for the Twilight novel series
- Twilight (2005); New Moon (2006); Eclipse (2007); Breaking Dawn (2008); Life and Death: Twilight Reimagined (2015); Midnight Sun (2020)
- Author: Stephenie Meyer
- Country: United States
- Language: English
- Genre: Fantasy romance, vampire literature, young adult fiction
- Publisher: Little, Brown and Company
- Published: 2005–2020
- Media type: Print
- No. of books: 4 (with 2 companions)

Twilight is a series of four vampiric-fantasy romance novels, two companion novels, and one novella written by American author Stephenie Meyer. Released annually from 2005 through 2008, the four novels chart the later teen years of Bella Swan, a girl who moves to Forks, Washington, and falls in love with a 104-year-old vampire named Edward Cullen. The series is told primarily from Bella's point of view, with the epilogue of Eclipse and the second part of Breaking Dawn being told from the viewpoint of character Jacob Black, a werewolf. A novella, The Short Second Life of Bree Tanner, which tells the story of a newborn vampire who appeared in Eclipse, was published in 2010. In 2015, Meyer published a new novel in honor of the 10th anniversary of the book series, Life and Death: Twilight Reimagined, with the genders of the original protagonists switched. Midnight Sun, a retelling of the first book, Twilight, from Edward Cullen's point of view, was published in 2020.

Since the release of the first novel, the books have gained immense popularity and commercial success around the world. The series is most popular among young adults; the four books have won multiple awards, most notably the 2008 British Book Award for Children's Book of the Year for Breaking Dawn, while the series as a whole won the 2009 Kids' Choice Award for Favorite Book.

As of August 2020, the series had sold over 160 million copies worldwide with translations into 49 different languages. The four Twilight books have consecutively set records as the biggest-selling novels of 2008 on the USA Today Best-Selling Books list and have spent over 235 weeks on the New York Times Best Seller list for Children's Series Books.

The novels have been adapted into The Twilight Saga film series by Summit Entertainment. The film adaptations of the first three novels were released in 2008, 2009, and 2010, respectively. The fourth novel was adapted into two films, the first film being released in 2011 and the second film in 2012. An animated television series based on Midnight Sun is in development at Netflix.

== Twilight Saga ==
=== Twilight ===
Bella Swan moves from Phoenix, Arizona to live with her father in Forks, Washington to allow her mother to travel with her new husband, a minor league baseball player. After moving to Forks, Bella finds herself involuntarily drawn to a mysterious, handsome boy, Edward Cullen and eventually learns that he is a member of a vampire family which drinks animal blood rather than human blood. Edward and Bella fall in love, while James, a sadistic vampire from another coven, is drawn to hunt down Bella. Edward and the other Cullens defend Bella. She escapes to Phoenix, where she is tricked into confronting James, who tries to kill her. She is seriously wounded, but Edward rescues her and they return to Forks.

=== New Moon ===
Edward and his family leave Forks because he believes he is endangering Bella's life. Bella goes into a depression until she develops a strong friendship with Jacob Black, who she discovers can shape-shift into a wolf. Jacob and the other wolves in his tribe must protect her from Victoria, a vampire seeking to avenge the death of her mate James. Due to a misunderstanding, Edward believes Bella is dead. Edward decides to commit suicide in Volterra, Italy, but is stopped by Bella, who is accompanied by Edward's sister, Alice. They meet with the Volturi, a powerful vampire coven, and are released only on the condition that Bella be turned into a vampire in the near future. Bella and Edward are reunited, and she and the Cullens return to Forks.

=== Eclipse ===
Victoria has created an army of "newborn" vampires to battle the Cullen family and murder Bella for revenge. Meanwhile, Bella is compelled to choose between her relationship with Edward and her friendship with Jacob. Edward's vampire family and Jacob's werewolf pack join forces to successfully destroy Victoria and her vampire army. In the end, Bella chooses Edward's love over Jacob's friendship and agrees to marry Edward.

=== Breaking Dawn ===
Bella and Edward are married, but their honeymoon is cut short when Bella discovers that she is pregnant. Her pregnancy progresses rapidly, severely weakening her. She nearly dies giving birth to her and Edward's daughter, Renesmee, a dhampir. Edward injects Bella with his venom to save her life and makes her a vampire. A vampire from another coven sees Renesmee and mistakes her for an "immortal child". She informs the Volturi, as the existence of such beings violates vampire law. The Cullens gather vampire witnesses who can verify that Renesmee is not an immortal child. After an intense confrontation, the Cullens and their witnesses convince the Volturi that the child poses no danger to vampires or their secret, and they are left in peace by the Volturi.

=== Life and Death ===
On October 6, 2015, Little, Brown and Company released the Twilight Tenth Anniversary/Life and Death Dual Edition, which includes a nearly-400 page reimagining of the novel with Edward and Bella gender-swapped as Edythe and Beau. The reimagined novel has a more conclusive ending, seemingly precluding its continuation through the remaining three Twilight novels.

=== Midnight Sun ===
Midnight Sun is a 2020 companion novel to the 2005 book Twilight by author Stephenie Meyer. The work retells the events of Twilight from the perspective of Edward Cullen instead of that of the series' usual narrating character Bella Swan. Meyer stated that Twilight was to be the only book from the series that she planned to rewrite from Edward's perspective. To give them a better feel of Edward's character, Meyer allowed Catherine Hardwicke, the director of the film adaptation of Twilight, and Robert Pattinson, the actor playing Edward, to read some completed chapters of the novel while they shot the film. It was released on August 4, 2020.

=== Future ===
In August 2020, Meyer revealed that she was working on two additional Twilight novels. The author intended to continue writing stories set in the universe, after completing an original novel first.

== Additional material ==
=== Graphic novels ===
On March 16, 2010, Yen Press released Twilight: The Graphic Novel, Vol. 1, by artist Young Kim based on the first book in the series. In February 2011, the graphic novel won the 2010 Gem Awards Best Manga of the Year. The sequel, Twilight: The Graphic Novel, Vol. 2 was released on October 11, 2011, and followed Volume 1 in topping The New York Times Best Seller list for Hardcover Graphic Books in its first week.

=== The Short Second Life of Bree Tanner ===
In March 2010, Meyer revealed on her official website that she will be releasing a new novella in the series, The Short Second Life of Bree Tanner, which tells the story of a newborn vampire who appeared in Eclipse, on June 5, 2010. An electronic version of the book was made available free from her web site, as well as in bookstores.

=== Illustrated Guide ===
In October 2010, Little, Brown and Company announced that The Twilight Saga: The Official Illustrated Guide, a definitive encyclopedic reference for the saga including character profiles, outtakes, a conversation with Meyer, genealogical charts, maps and extensive cross-references with nearly 100 full color illustrations, was to be released on April 12, 2011, after many publication delays since 2008. It debuted at No. 1 on The New York Times Best Seller list, where it stayed for three consecutive weeks, and at No. 4 on the USA Today Best Seller list.

== Main characters ==
- Bella Swan: The protagonist of the series, teenager Bella is a perpetually clumsy "danger magnet" with dark brown hair and brown eyes. She is often portrayed as having low self-esteem and unable to comprehend Edward's love for her. She has an immunity to supernatural abilities involving the mind, such as Edward's mind-reading ability. After her transformation into a vampire in the saga's fourth installment, Bella acquires the ability to shield both herself and others from "mental harm" from other vampires.
- Edward Cullen: Edward is a vampire who lives with a coven of like-minded vampires known as the Cullen family, who feed on animals rather than humans. Over the course of the Twilight series, Edward falls in love with, marries, and then has a child with Bella. At first, Edward feels a mutual hatred toward Jacob Black because of his love for Bella, but in Breaking Dawn, he comes to see Jacob as a brother and friend. Like some vampires, Edward has a supernatural ability: mind reading. It allows him to read anyone's thoughts within a few miles' radius. Bella is immune to his power as a human, but learns how to lower this "shield" after her transformation to a vampire.
- Jacob Black: A minor character in the first novel, Jacob is introduced as a member of the Quileute tribe. He resurfaces in New Moon with a larger role as Bella's best friend as she struggles through her depression over losing Edward. Although he is in love with Bella, she initially sees him as just her best friend. He and other tribe members can shape-shift into wolves. In Eclipse Bella realizes that while she does love Jacob, her feelings for Edward Cullen are stronger. In Breaking Dawn, Jacob imprinted on Bella and Edward's baby daughter, Renesmee, ridding him of his heartache for Bella.

== Setting ==
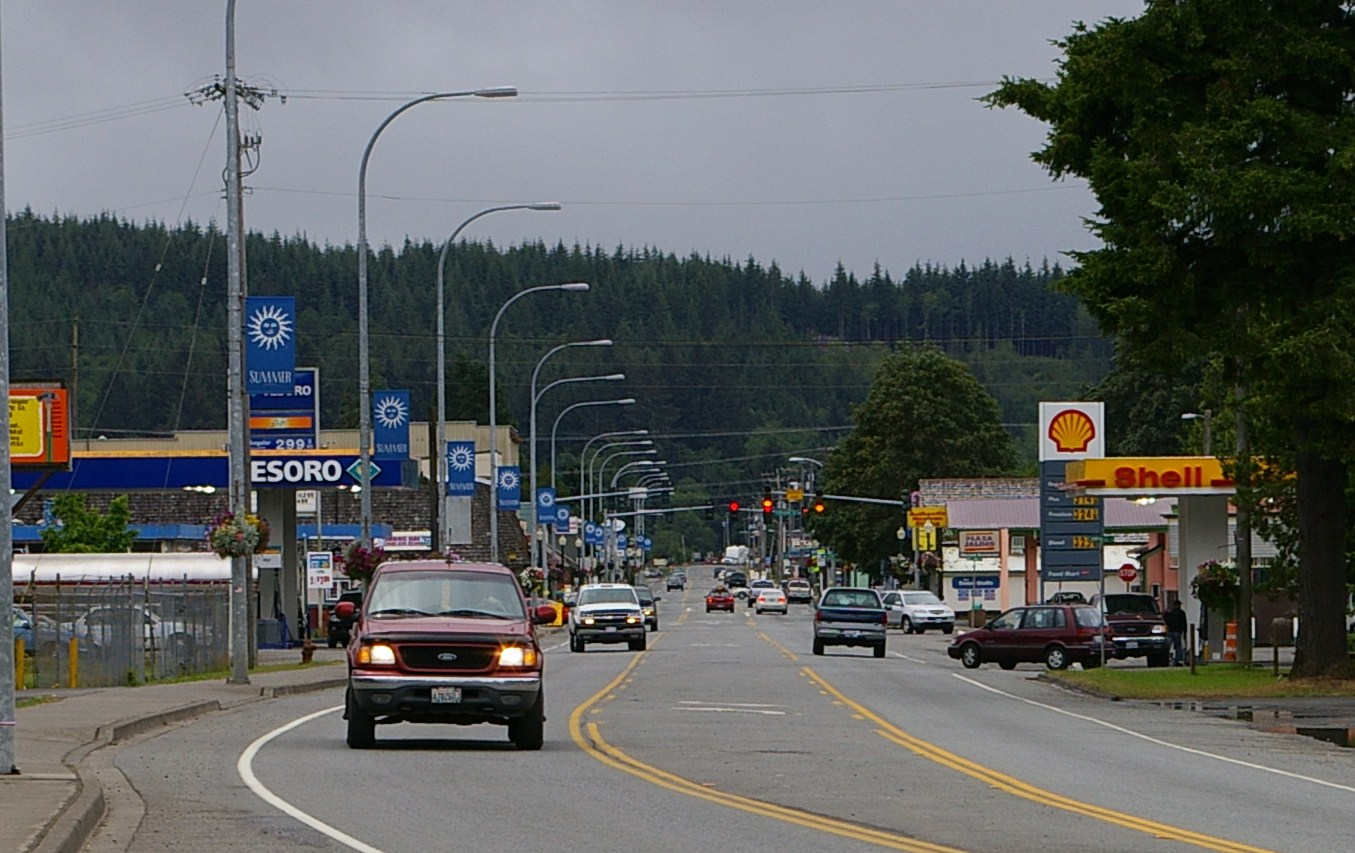
Forks, Washington

The story is set primarily in the town of Forks, Washington, where Bella and her father, Charlie Swan, live. Other cities in Washington briefly appear in the series or are mentioned, such as Port Angeles, Olympia, Seattle and La Push. Some events in Twilight take place in Phoenix, Arizona, where Bella was raised. Volterra, Italy, is featured in New Moon, when Edward travels there to commit suicide and Bella rushes to save him. Jacksonville, Florida, is mentioned first in Twilight and second in Eclipse, when Edward and Bella visit Bella's mother, who has moved there with her new husband. Seattle, Washington, is featured in Breaking Dawn when Jacob tries to escape his love for Bella, and when Bella tries to locate a man named J. Jenks. It is also the location of a series of murders committed by newborn vampires in Eclipse. In Breaking Dawn, Bella and Edward spend their honeymoon on a fictional "Isle Esme", purportedly off the coast of Brazil.

== Structure and genre ==
The Twilight series falls under the genre of young adult, fantasy, and romance, though Meyer categorized her first book, Twilight, as "suspense romance horror comedy". However, she states that she considers her books as "romance more than anything else". The series explores the unorthodox romance between human Bella and vampire Edward, as well as the love triangle between Bella, Edward, and Jacob, a werewolf. The books avoid delving into provocative sex, drugs, and harsh swearing because, according to Meyer, "I don't think teens need to read about gratuitous sex."

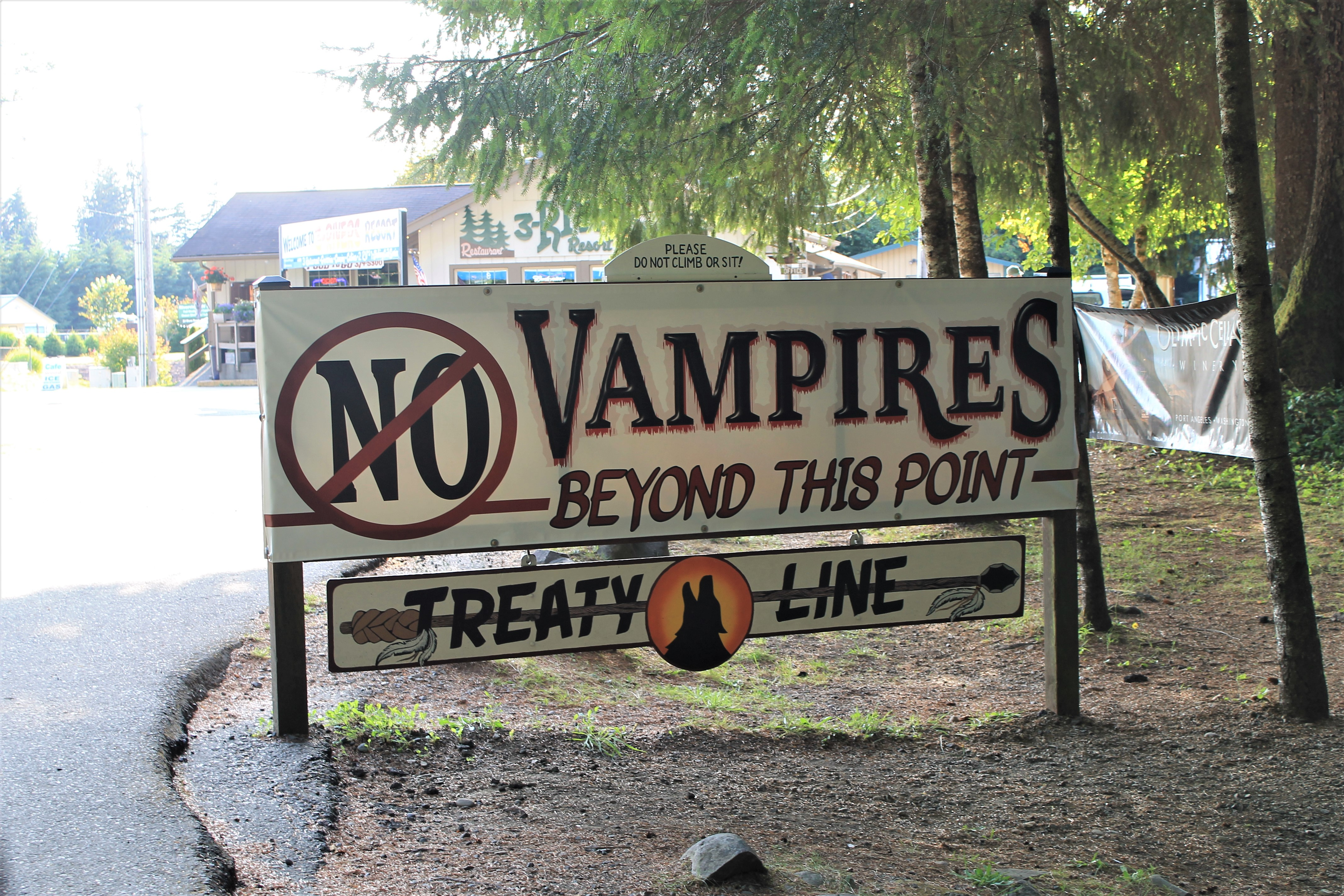
"No Vampires" sign in La Push, Washington

To some, Meyer's novels fall into the category of gothic literature as well. Meyer's use of monsters and the unsettling circumstances of Edward and Bella's relationship are key components to the gothic. Gothic literature allows readers to analyze abstract concepts through dark or disturbing analogies. The disturbing nature of the gothic is a result of "repressed familiarity," according to neurologist Sigmund Freud, and we are meant to see ourselves in Meyer's monsters. It is also interesting to note that dreams are an important theme in the gothic genre, and Meyer's main inspiration for Twilight came from a dream. Mary Shelley's Frankenstein, a classic in gothic literature, was also inspired by a dream. Twilight moves away from the classical gothic however, through Bella's sympathy toward Edward. Rather than feeling disgust for the vampire, the dangerous intrigue she takes in him moves the plot forward.

The books are written in first-person narrative, primarily through Bella's eyes with the epilogue of the third book and a part of the fourth book being from Jacob's point of view. When asked about the structure of the novel, Meyer described her difficulty in pinpointing the premise of the novels to any specific category. The novels involve vampires, but they are not the typical tragic or bloodthirsty kind. The main characters are high schoolers, but according to some, that description also unfairly stereotypes the series.

The books are based on the vampire myth, but Twilight vampires differ in a number of particulars from the general vampire lore. For instance, Twilight vampires have strong piercing teeth rather than fangs; they glitter in sunlight rather than burn; and they can drink animal as well as human blood. Meyer comments that her vampire mythology differs from that of other authors because she wasn't informed about the canon vampires. She did not consider the way her vampires differed from established literature until Twilight was close to being published. By that time, it was too late to make drastic changes and Meyer kept her vampires sans "fang and coffins and so forth" not as an act of separation from vampire canon, but as staying true to the way the characters appeared in her mind.

== Inspiration and themes ==
According to the author, her books are "about life, not death" and "love, not lust". Each book in the series was inspired by and loosely based on a different literary classic: Twilight on Jane Austen's 1813 novel Pride and Prejudice, New Moon on William Shakespeare's play Romeo and Juliet, Eclipse on Emily Brontë's 1847 novel Wuthering Heights, and Breaking Dawn on a second Shakespeare play, A Midsummer Night's Dream. Meyer also states that Orson Scott Card and L. M. Montgomery's Anne of Green Gables series are a big influence on her writing. The Cullens were inspired by Meyer's own family as well as characters from X-Men: The Animated Series. Other influences on the series which Meyer has acknowledged include the 1847 novel Jane Eyre by Charlotte Brontë, HGTV, and the films Iron Man (2008), Somewhere in Time (1980), Stranger than Fiction (2006), and Baby Mama (2008).

Other major themes of the series include choice and free will. Meyer says that the books are centered around Bella's choice to choose her life on her own, and the Cullens' choices to abstain from killing rather than follow their temptations: "I really think that's the underlying metaphor of my vampires. It doesn't matter where you're stuck in life or what you think you have to do; you can always choose something else. There's always a different path."

Meyer, a Mormon, acknowledges that her faith has influenced her work. In particular, she says that her characters "tend to think more about where they came from, and where they are going, than might be typical." The Twilight series analyzes the Christian moral dilemma of mortal temptation. As a vampire, Edward experiences strong carnal temptations that would result in the corruption of his sense of self. Overcoming these temptations illustrates a common Christian principles of "overcoming the natural man". Mormon tenets of immortality and eternal life are also explored in the series. The vampires have perfected, immortal bodies, but the Cullens long for satisfying relationships. Bella achieves both immortality and the Mormon concept of eternal life by becoming a vampire alongside her husband and daughter. Meyer also steers her work from subjects such as sex, despite the romantic nature of the novels. Meyer says that she does not consciously intend her novels to be Mormon-influenced, or to promote the virtues of sexual abstinence and spiritual purity, but admits that her writing is shaped by her values, saying, "I don't think my books are going to be really graphic or dark, because of who I am. There's always going to be a lot of light in my stories."

== Origins and publishing history ==
Stephenie Meyer says that the idea for Twilight came to her in a dream on June 2, 2003. The dream was about a human girl, and a vampire who was in love with her but thirsted for her blood. Based on this dream, Meyer wrote the transcript of what is now chapter 13 of the book. Despite having very little writing experience, in a matter of three months she had transformed that dream into a completed novel. After writing and editing the novel, she signed a three-book deal with Little, Brown and Company for $750,000, an unusually high amount for a first time author. Meyer's literary agent, Jodi Reamer of Writers House, discovered her only because the inexperienced assistant who received Meyer's original letter did not know that young adult books are supposed to be 40,000 to 60,000 words in length, not 130,000 words. Megan Tingley, the Little, Brown editor who signed Meyer, said that halfway through the reading of the Twilight manuscript, she realized that she had a future bestseller in her hands. The book was released in 2005.

Following the success of Twilight, Meyer expanded the story into a series with three more books: New Moon (2006), Eclipse (2007), and Breaking Dawn (2008). In its first week after publication, the first sequel, New Moon, debuted at No. 5 on the New York Times Best Seller List for Children's Chapter Books, and in its second week rose to the #1 position, where it remained for the next eleven weeks. In total, it spent over 50 weeks on the list. After the release of Eclipse, the first three "Twilight" books spent a combined 143 weeks on the New York Times Best Seller List. The fourth installment of the Twilight series, Breaking Dawn, was released with an initial print run of 3.7 million copies. Over 1.3 million copies were sold on the first day alone, setting a record in first-day sales performance for the Hachette Book Group USA. Upon the completion of the fourth entry in the series, Meyer indicated that Breaking Dawn would be the final novel to be told from Bella Swan's perspective. In 2008 and 2009, the four books of the series claimed the top four spots on USA Today's year-end bestseller list, making Meyer the first author to ever achieve this feat. The series then won the 2009 Kids' Choice Award for Favorite Book, where it competed against the Harry Potter series.

== Reception ==
The response to Twilight has been mixed. While the books have become immensely popular, they have also generated much controversy.

=== Positive reception ===
Twilight has gathered acclaim for its popularity with its target readers. The Times lauded it for capturing "perfectly the teenage feeling of sexual tension and alienation." Other reviews described Twilight as an "exquisite fantasy", and a "gripping blend of romance and horror". Lev Grossman of Time wrote that the books have a "pillowy quality distinctly reminiscent of Internet fan fiction", but still praised the series, comparing it to The Lord of the Rings and Harry Potter:

People do not want to just read Meyer's books; they want to climb inside them and live there... There's no literary term for the quality Twilight and Harry Potter (and The Lord of the Rings) share, but you know it when you see it: their worlds have a freestanding internal integrity that makes you feel as if you should be able to buy real estate there.

The Seattle Post-Intelligencer called the book a "hot new teen novel", Entertainment Weekly called Meyer "the world's most popular vampire novelist since Anne Rice", The New York Times described Twilight as a "literary phenomenon", and Matt Arado of Daily Herald noted that the Twilight books have become the "hottest publishing phenomenon since a certain bespectacled wizard cast his spell on the world." The large and diverse online fan community of the series are often noted, sometimes even being called "cult-like". Despite this, the series is often considered to have a wider appeal; Crystal Mack of Daily Herald said, "While teenage girls are the main audience, young boys and adults of both genders have also been swept up in the phenomenon."

The author and the series' popularity are often compared with J. K. Rowling and Harry Potter. Describing the fan following of the books, the Phoenix New Times wrote, "Meyer's fandom is reminiscent of Harry Potter mania." The Daily Telegraph described Twilight as the "spiritual successor to Harry Potter". Rebekah Bradford of The Post and Courier stated that the series has a "huge crossover appeal much like the Harry Potter books before them." According to the Daily Telegraph, "Stephenie Meyer, in particular, has achieved incredible success across all the English-speaking nations and Europe and many will say that her Twilight series has filled the hole left by Harry Potter." Meyer has responded to such comparisons, saying, "It's terribly flattering to be compared to her, but there's never going to be another J. K. Rowling; that's a phenomenon that's not gonna happen again", however noting that "you can compare my fans to her fans more easily [than me to her]. I do think that we both have people who are just really really enthusiastic, and will come miles to see you and be involved, and everybody really cares about our characters."

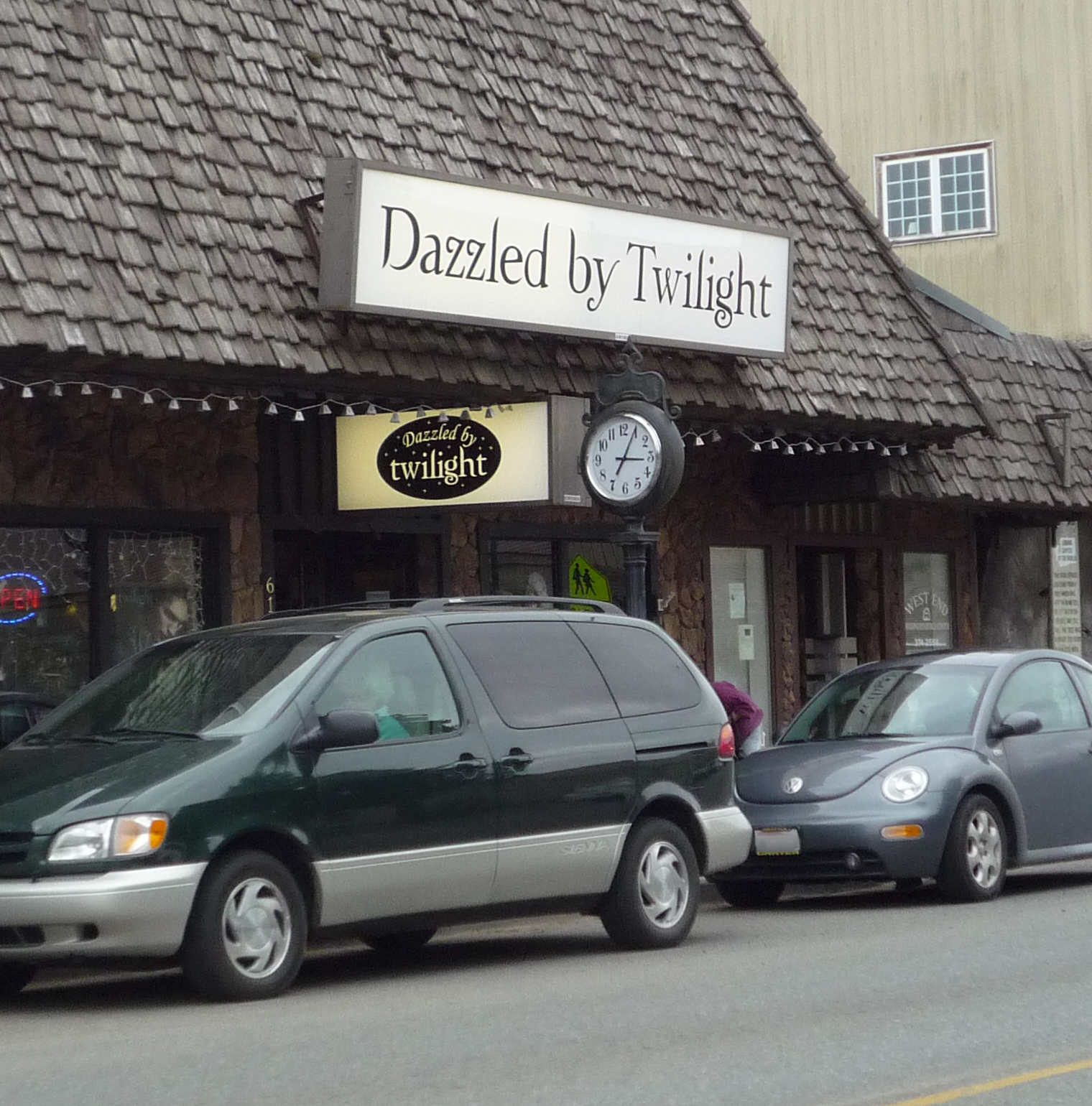
A store catering to tourists interested in the Twilight series in Forks, Washington

Economically, the town of Forks, Washington, the setting for the Twilight series, has improved due to tourism from fans of the books. Forks is visited by an average of 8,000 tourists per month, and has been described as a "mecca for Twilighters". In response to plans for the aging Forks High School to be renovated, Twilight fans have teamed up with Infinite Jewelry Co. and the West Olympic Peninsula Betterment Association to collect donations in an attempt to save the brick appearance or the building altogether.

On November 5, 2019, the BBC News listed The Twilight Series on its list of the 100 most influential novels.

In 2020, the series was shelved in the Library of Congress, which is secluded for novels of significance and for preservation.

=== Negative reception ===
The series has garnered some notoriety both over its literary substance and over the type of relationship portrayed in the books.

Many have derided the series as poor writing. While comparing Stephenie Meyer to J. K. Rowling, Stephen King said, "the real difference [between Rowling and Meyer] is that Jo Rowling is a terrific writer, and Stephenie Meyer can't write worth a darn. She's not very good." However, King understood the appeal of the series, adding, "People are attracted by the stories, by the pace and in the case of Stephenie Meyer, it's very clear that she's writing to a whole generation of girls and opening up kind of a safe joining of love and sex in those books. It's exciting and it's thrilling and it's not particularly threatening because it's not overtly sexual."

A quote from Robin Browne (though frequently misattributed to King or Andrew Futral) negatively compares the Twilight and Harry Potter book series: "Harry Potter is about confronting fears, finding inner strength and doing what is right in the face of adversity ... Twilight is about how important it is to have a boyfriend".

Laura Miller of Salon.com wrote that "the characters, such as they are, are stripped down to a minimum, lacking the texture and idiosyncrasies of actual people", and said that "Twilight would be a lot more persuasive as an argument that an 'amazing heart' counts for more than appearances if it didn't harp so incessantly on Edward's superficial splendors."

Elizabeth Hand of The Washington Post wrote, "Meyer's prose seldom rises above the serviceable, and the plotting is leaden." The article, featured on the Yahoo! website Shine, also criticized the books and the author's final word on the series was, "Good books deal with themes of longing and loneliness, sexual passion and human frailty, alienation and fear just as the Twilight books do. But they do so by engaging us with complexities of feeling and subtleties of character, expressed in language that rises above banal mediocrity. Their reward is something more than just an escape into banal mediocrity. We deserve something better to get hooked on."

==== Controversy ====
The books have also been widely critiqued as promoting, normalizing, and idealizing an emotionally and physically abusive relationship. Sci-fi website io9 noted that Bella and Edward's relationship meets all fifteen criteria set by the National Domestic Violence Hotline for being in an abusive relationship. L. Lee Butler of Young Adult Library Services Association commented how he was unusually hesitant to stock the Twilight books in his library because he felt the books were "robbing [teen girls] of agency and normalizing stalking and abusive behavior." Many female-oriented and feminist media outlets, like Jezebel, The Frisky, and Salon.com have decried Twilight as promoting an anti-woman message. Bitch magazine stated the novels "had created a new, popular genre of "abstinence porn", concluding that, "In reality, the abstinence message—wrapped in the genre of abstinence porn—objectifies Bella in the same ways that 'real' porn might. The Twilight books conflate Bella losing her virginity with the loss of other things, including her sense of self and her very life. Such a high-stakes treatment of abstinence reinforces the idea that Bella is powerless, an object, a fact that is highlighted when we get to the sex scenes in Breaking Dawn." Ms. declared that Twilight promotes a physically abusive relationship and an anti-abortion message. However, writer Angela Aleiss of Religion News Service said that contrary to popular opinion, Mormons do permit abortion when the mother's life is in danger. Bella's refusal to abort her fetus, along with her quick marriage and pregnancy, instead underscore the Mormon emphasis on family.

Various psychology experts have come out in agreement with the assessment of the relationship as abusive. Melissa Henson, Director of communication and public education for the Parents Television Council, stated:

To impressionable teens, domestic violence is almost romanticized. We've made great strides in recent years in clearly communicating the message that is never okay to hit a woman...Today, the hidden message in the entertainment consumed by many impressionable teens is that if he hits you, it is out of love – which is absolutely wrong.

Many entertainment and media outlets have made similar comments on the abusive nature of Bella and Edward's relationship, including Entertainment Weekly, Movieline, and Mediabistro.com.

Meyer has dismissed such criticisms, arguing both that the books center around Bella's choice, which she perceives as the foundation of modern feminism, and that Bella's damsel in distress persona is due only to her humanity. Meyer also added, "Just because [Bella] doesn't do kung fu and she cooks for her father doesn't make her worthy of that criticism". Shannon Simcox of The Daily Collegian has similarly dismissed the criticism surrounding Bella, commenting, "While Bella plays the perfect damsel in distress that gets herself into sticky situations, she is also very in control of herself. She chose to move to Forks and be in a new place; she constantly faces a bunch of people who want to suck the life right out of her, and she is constantly pleading to become a vampire, too, so she can take care of herself and Edward."

=== Legal issues ===
In December 2010, professional singer Matthew Smith, known as Matt Heart, sued Summit Entertainment in the case Smith v. Summit Entertainment LLC. Smith's song "Eternal Knight" was posted on several websites accompanied by cover art which Summit claimed used its "Twilight" typeface mark. Smith won four of the seven causes of action, including his right to continue distribution of his copyrighted song, under the terms that he remove any reference to "Twilight" or the "Twilight Saga".

=== Book challenges ===
The Twilight series made the number five spot on the American Library Association's (ALA) Top Ten List of the Most Frequently Challenged Books of 2009, for being "Sexually Explicit", "Unsuited to Age Group", and having a "Religious Viewpoint".

== Film adaptations ==
A screenplay for Twilight was written by Melissa Rosenberg and has been adapted into a film by Summit Entertainment. The film was directed by Catherine Hardwicke, with Kristen Stewart and Robert Pattinson in the leading roles of Isabella Swan and Edward Cullen, respectively. The movie was released in the United States on November 21, 2008. Twilight: The Complete Illustrated Movie Companion, written by Mark Cotta Vaz, was released October 28.

On November 22, 2008, following the box office success of Twilight, Summit Entertainment confirmed a sequel, called The Twilight Saga: New Moon, based on the second book in the series, New Moon. The film was released on November 20, 2009. The Twilight Saga: New Moon was released on DVD and Blu-ray on March 20, 2010, through midnight release parties. That same day, Summit Entertainment released Twilight in Forks, a documentary about the primary setting of the Twilight series, Forks, Washington. Topics Entertainment released its own documentary about Forks and the Twilight series on March 16, called Forks: Bitten by Twilight.

The third installment in the series, The Twilight Saga: Eclipse, was released on June 30, 2010. The fourth installment, The Twilight Saga: Breaking Dawn – Part 1 was released November 18, 2011. The fifth and last installment, The Twilight Saga: Breaking Dawn – Part 2 was released November 16, 2012.

== Impact ==
While the Twilight series has been a visible presence in many conventions such as ComicCon, there have also been many conventions whose main focus has been on the Twilight series (books and films). Some notable conventions have been TwiCon in 2009 and a series of "Official Twilight Conventions" that are being held by Creation Entertainment.

Forever Twilight in Forks Festival is a Twilight themed festival that has been held every year since 2007 in Forks, Washington. The dates of the festival coincide with Bella Swan's birthday, September 13. Originally called Stephenie Meyer's Day, the festival was eventually rebranded by the Forks Chamber of Commerce, and has led to an increase in tourism to the town. The festival attracts fans to visit famous sites from the movies, including Forks High School, Bella's house, the Cullens' house, Newton hardware store, and La Push Beach. Fans often dress up as their favorite book characters.

== See also ==
- The Host (2013 film)
- The Host (novel)
