= Edward Cullen =

Fictional character in the Twilight series

- Twilight character
- Edward Cullen as portrayed by Robert Pattinson in the Twilight film series
- First appearance: Twilight
- Last appearance: Midnight Sun
- Created by: Stephenie Meyer
- Portrayed by: Robert Pattinson

In-universe information
- Alias: Edward Anthony Masen (human name)
- Species: Vampire; Human (originally; formerly)
- Gender: Male
- Occupation: Student
- Family: Edward Masen, Sr. (biological father; deceased); Elizabeth Masen (biological mother; deceased); Carlisle Cullen (adoptive father); Esme Cullen (adoptive mother); Emmett Cullen and Jasper Hale (adoptive brothers); Alice Cullen and Rosalie Hale (adoptive sisters); Charlie Swan (father-in-law); Renée Dwyer (mother-in-law); Jacob Black (future son-in-law)
- Spouse: Bella Swan
- Children: Renesmee Cullen

Edward Cullen (né Edward Anthony Masen, Jr.) is a character in the Twilight book series by Stephenie Meyer. He is featured in the novels Twilight, New Moon, Eclipse and Breaking Dawn, and their corresponding film adaptations, and the novel Midnight Sun—a re-telling of the events of Twilight from Edward's perspective. Edward is a telepathic vampire who, over the course of the series, falls in love with, marries, and fathers a child with Bella Swan, a human teenager who later becomes a vampire as well. In the films, Edward is played by actor Robert Pattinson.

== Concept and creation ==
Stephenie Meyer stated that the original concept of Edward originated in a dream that she had, in which an "average girl" and a "fantastically beautiful, sparkly ... vampire ... were having an intense conversation in a meadow in the woods". In this dream, the pair "were discussing the difficulties inherent in the facts that ... they were falling in love with each other while ... the vampire was particularly attracted to the scent of her blood, and was having a difficult time restraining himself from killing her". She chose the name "Edward" because she thought it was "a name that had once been considered romantic, but had fallen out of popularity for decades". Meyer says that Edward is a combination of her three favorite leading men—Jane Eyre's Edward Rochester, Fitzwilliam Darcy from Pride and Prejudice, and Gilbert Blythe from Anne of Green Gables—particularly Edward Rochester, who, like Edward Cullen, sees himself as a "monster". A recurring theme in the series, especially in the first three books, is that Edward is constantly trying to avoid accidentally harming Bella, due to his vampire nature.

== Appearances ==
=== Twilight ===
In Twilight, Edward meets Bella Swan, a 17-year-old outcast whose thoughts he is unable to read, and whose blood smells overwhelmingly sweet to him. Edward builds a growing attraction to Bella, and after saving her life on several occasions, he succumbs and eventually falls in love with her. Edward admits to Bella that he is a vampire, and that although he retains the physical body of a seventeen-year-old, he was actually born on June 20, 1901. His adoptive father, Carlisle Cullen, transformed him into a vampire in 1918 to prevent him from dying in the Spanish influenza epidemic in Chicago, Illinois by the request of Edward's mother, who begged him to do whatever it took to save him. Carlisle instilled in him a sense of morality uncommon in most vampires, and central to his way of life is the refusal to consider humans as food.

However, Edward constantly warns Bella against being with him, perceiving her life to be at risk if she continues to associate with him. Bella's love and confidence in Edward's restraint cause her to ignore his warnings, even after she becomes the vampire James' target. Unlike the Cullen family, who are "vegetarian" vampires (committed to only feeding on animals), James regularly feeds on humans and will not stop until he drinks Bella's blood. With his family's help, Edward is able to save Bella from James' predations, but how to assure Bella's continued safety remains an open question.

=== New Moon ===
In New Moon, Edward's fears for Bella's safety intensify when she cuts her finger and is attacked by his brother Jasper. In an attempt to protect her, he convinces her that he no longer loves her, and moves away with his family, leaving Bella heartbroken and depressed for several months. Edward finds it difficult to live without Bella, and becomes severely depressed at the prospect of an infinitely long and meaningless life. After he mistakenly learns from his sister Rosalie that Bella has committed suicide, Edward attempts to convince a group of Italian vampires, the Volturi, to kill him. Together with his sister Alice, Bella rushes to Italy and stops Edward before the Volturi can destroy him.

Edward explains why he left and apologizes to Bella. She eventually forgives him entirely, and they continue with their relationship as though Edward had never left, with the exception that Bella has ties that cannot be broken with a werewolf named Jacob Black. Bella successfully seeks the support of Edward's family on turning her into a vampire. While Edward is furious at the prospect, he later agrees to change her himself if she agrees to marry him first.

=== Eclipse ===
In Eclipse, Bella agrees to marry Edward on the condition he will make love to her while she is still human. Edward eventually relents and agrees, on the stipulation it will only occur after they are married. The plot is driven by the machinations of the vampire Victoria, who, seeking revenge for the death of her mate James, is hunting Bella and creating new vampires to build an army. A grudging truce is made between the Cullens and the Native-American werewolf pack led by Sam Uley and Jacob Black, a friend of Bella's who was there for her when Edward broke her heart. However, the truce is endangered when Bella realizes Jacob means more to her than she thought. Ultimately, Edward accepts that Bella cares for Jacob and successfully destroys Victoria, and Bella acknowledges that Edward is the most important person in her life. Edward tells Bella that they may attempt making love before they get married, as he realizes that she spends too much of her life trying to please other people. However, she refuses his offer and agrees to doing things the way Edward initially wanted: marriage, making love, and then becoming a vampire.

=== Breaking Dawn ===
Breaking Dawn sees Edward and Bella marry. Bella becomes pregnant on their honeymoon, and the rapid growth of the half-human, half-vampire fetus swiftly impacts on Bella's health. Edward tries to coerce her into having an abortion in order to save her own life. However, Bella feels a bond with her unborn child and insists on giving birth. Edward comes to feel love for the baby as well, after he hears its thoughts and learns that the baby loves Bella in return. Bella nearly dies giving birth in an emergency c-section, but Edward successfully delivers his daughter and then injects Bella's heart with his venom, healing her wounds by turning her into an immortal vampire. During Bella's painful transformation, Jacob imprints on their baby daughter, Renesmee.

After a vampire named Irina mistakes Renesmee for an immortal vampire child—a creation forbidden in the vampire world—the Volturi arrive to destroy the Cullens. Edward stands with Bella and their allies to convince the Volturi that Renesmee is not an immortal child and poses no threat to their existence. Once the Volturi leave, Edward and Bella feel free to live their lives in peace with their daughter.

== Characterization ==
Edward is described in the book as being charming, polite, determined, and very stubborn. He is very protective over Bella and puts her safety, humanity and welfare before anything else. He often over-analyzes situations and has a tendency to overreact, especially in situations where Bella's safety is at risk. He retains some outdated speech from his human life in the early 20th century. Edward sees himself as a monster, and after falling in love with Bella, he desperately wishes that he were human instead of a vampire.

=== Physical appearance ===
Like all the vampires in the Twilight series, Edward is described as being impossibly beautiful. At various points in the series, Bella compares him to the mythical Greek god Adonis. His skin is "like marble"—very pale, rock hard, ice cold, and sparkles in the sunlight. She describes his facial features as being perfect and angular—high cheekbones, strong jawline, a straight nose, and full lips. His hair, which is always messy, retains the unusual bronze shade that he inherited in his human life from his biological mother. His eyes, once green, are now described as topaz. His appearance changes if he goes too long without feeding: his eyes darken, becoming almost black, and purple bruises appear beneath his eyes. Edward is 6'2", and has a slender but muscular body.

=== Vampiric abilities and personal interests ===
Edward, like all vampires in the Twilight series, possesses superhuman stamina, senses, mentality and agility, as well as a healing factor and night vision. His superhuman strength allows him to subdue his prey, uproot trees, throw cars and crush metal. His bodily tissue is stronger than granite, making him much more durable and tougher than humans, as well as contributing slightly to his body weight. He is described as being inhumanly beautiful with refined and perfected features. His scent and voice are enormously seductive to Bella, so much so that he occasionally sends her into a pliant daze entirely by accident. In Twilight, Edward explains that, like other vampires, he does not need to breathe, though he chooses to do so out of habit and because it is helpful to smell his environment. He cannot digest regular food, and compares its attractiveness for him to the prospect of eating dirt for a regular person. Like other vampires, Edward is not able to sleep.

In addition to the traits he shares with his fellow vampires, Edward has certain abilities that are his alone. He possesses superior superhuman speed compared to that of other vampires and is the fastest of the Cullens, able to outrun any of them. Edward is also telepathic, able to read the mind of anyone within a few miles of himself; Bella is the sole exception to this rule, which Meyer has stated is due to Bella having a very private mind. Edward also retains some of the traditional mindset and dated patterns of speech from his early 20th-century human life.

Edward is musical, able to play the piano like a virtuoso. He enjoys a wide range of music, including classical, jazz, progressive metal, alternative rock, and punk rock, but dislikes country. He prefers indie rock to mainstream, and appreciates rock and classical music equally. He mentions in Twilight that he likes music from the fifties better than the sixties, dislikes the seventies, and says the eighties were "bearable".

A hobby of Edward's is collecting cars. He owns a Volvo S60 R and an Aston Martin V12 Vanquish as a "special occasion" car. He also gave his sister Alice a Porsche 911 Turbo as a gift in Eclipse. He bought a motorcycle to ride alongside Bella, but gave it to Jasper after he realized that riding motorcycles was a hobby she enjoyed sharing with Jacob.

== Film portrayal ==
=== Casting ===
Prior to the role of Edward being cast for the 2008 Twilight film, Meyer opined that, although Edward was "Indisputably the most difficult character to cast, [he] is also the one that I'm most passionately decided upon. The only actor I've ever seen who I think could come close to pulling off Edward Cullen is....(drumroll)....Henry Cavill." When the film was optioned by Summit Entertainment in July 2007, Meyer stated that; "The most disappointing thing for me is losing my perfect Edward", as Cavill was by then 24 years old, and thus too old to realistically fill the role. Meyer reported on her website that the four most popular fan suggestions for actors to play Edward were Hayden Christensen, Robert Pattinson, Orlando Bloom and Gerard Way. On December 11, 2007, it was announced that Pattinson, known for his portrayal of Cedric Diggory in the Harry Potter films, had been cast in the role. Erik Feig, Summit Entertainment's President of Production, stated: "It is always a challenge to find the right actor for a part that has lived so vividly in the imaginations of readers but we took the responsibility seriously and are confident, with Rob Pattinson, that we have found the perfect Edward for our Bella in Twilight." Meyer stated that; "I am ecstatic with Summit's choice for Edward. There are very few actors who can look both dangerous and beautiful at the same time, and even fewer who I can picture in my head as Edward. Robert Pattinson is going to be amazing."

Twilight's director, Catherine Hardwicke, said of the casting process that "[e]verybody has such an idealized vision of Edward. They were rabid [about who I was going to cast]. Like, old ladies saying, 'You better get it right." She revealed that she was initially underwhelmed by a photo of Pattinson, but said of his audition, which was a love scene with co-star Kristen Stewart: "It was electric. The room shorted out, the sky opened up, and I was like, 'This is going to be good.'" Pattinson has admitted; "I had no idea how to play the part when I went in, and it was a good thing to find during the audition. I really wanted it after that, but I didn't really even know what it was. I hadn't really read any of the books. And just from that, 'I want this job.' It was pretty much because of Kristen." In early 2008, Pattinson spoke of a fan backlash against his casting, disclosing Entertainment Weekly that "I stopped reading [fansites and blogs] after I saw the signatures saying 'Please, anyone else.'" He revealed to the Evening Standard that; "The books have a huge following, and I've already got bags of letters from angry fans, telling me that I can't possibly play Edward, because I'm Diggory. I hope I can prove them wrong."

=== Development ===
Following an April 2008 set visit, Meyer opined that Pattinson and Stewart had developed chemistry so good it "may cause hyperventilation". Pattinson revealed that Meyer had given him an early copy of Midnight Sun—a re-telling of the events of Twilight, narrated from Edward's point of view. He explained that: "That is what I liked about [taking on] the job, because the guy doesn't really exist that much, so you can just create whatever you want. Then, when I found out there was another book from Edward's perspective, [I read it and it turned out] we had the same perspective!" In preparation for the role, Pattinson wrote journal entries as Edward and distanced from his friends and family, explaining that he "wanted to feel his isolation". Physically, he revealed that; "I was supposed to get a six-pack. But it didn't really work out." One scene in the story sees Edward, a gifted pianist, compose a lullaby for Bella. Pattinson was given the opportunity to submit a composition for consideration for this scene, with Hardwicke stating; "I told him he should write one, and let's see if we can make it work, because that would be really cool if it was Rob's song. He's a beautiful musician, a very creative soul, very similar to Edward. He just totally reads the most interesting stuff, and sees the most interesting movies, and is very introspective and diving into his existential self." Meyer approved; "If Robert could write a lullaby, that would definitely add to some of the mystique of the movie, wouldn't it?" While two of Pattinson's compositions do feature in the final film, the lullaby piece finally selected was composed by Carter Burwell.

In April 2008, Hardwicke, in a turnabout from her initial underwhelmed reaction upon first seeing a photograph of Pattinson, enthused; "The thing that's great about him is he really does [...] feel like he's otherworldly. I mean, he doesn't look like a normal guy. And when you read the book, you think, 'Who on the planet can live up to this description?' But I think he does. He's just got that chiseled face that photographs exactly like it's described in the book. When you read about the sculptured cheeks and chiseled jawbone and everything, it's like, 'Wow. Did she write this for Rob?" Pattinson, in a detailed interview on how he perceives the character, admitted to having incorporated aspects of Rebel Without a Cause into his portrayal of Edward, assessing; "I guess kind of the thing which I found interesting is that he is essentially the hero of this story but violently denies that he is the hero. Like at every point even when he does heroic things he still thinks that he's [...] the most ridiculously selfish evil creature around. [..] He refuses to accept Bella's love for him but at the same time can't help but just kind of needs it, which is kind of what the essential storyline is." Appearing at ComicCon in July 2008 while the film was in post-production, Pattinson surmised the Twilight experience as: "bizarre. You kind of know that it is essentially the book. The book has so many obsessive, obsessively loyal fans. It's strange because people just immediately relate you to the character right away rather than you as an actor." Pattinson reprised his role as Edward in all of the Twilight sequels.

In an interview, Pattinson admits that he never had formal training on how to do his American accent; "...I just grew up watching American movies... I kind of learned how to act, or whatever, from American films.

== Reception ==
Larry Carroll for MTV Movies deemed Edward and Bella "an iconic love story for a whole generation", while Kirkus cited Edward's portrayal in Twilight as being "overly Byronic". Edward Cullen was also ranked #5 on the Forbes list of Hollywood's 10 Most Powerful Vampires. Entertainment Weekly named him "one of the greatest characters of the last 20 years" and described him as a "literary influence and love of girls and women everywhere for a long time to come".

Since the release of the Twilight series, the character of Edward has developed somewhat of a cult following, with millions of devoted, mostly female, fans worldwide. However, while the character has been called the "obsession of teen girls", several criticisms of his character, in particular accusations of sexism, have emerged. Gina R. Dalfonzo of the National Review Online described Edward's character as mentally unstable and a "predator", using behavioral examples such as spying on Bella while she sleeps, eavesdropping on her conversations, dictating her choice of friends, and encouraging her to deceive her father as reasons why Dalfonzo believes he is "one of modern fiction's best candidates for a restraining order."
