= The Twilight Saga: The Official Illustrated Guide =

2011 reference book by Stephenie Meyer

- Author: Stephenie Meyer
- Original title: The Twilight Saga: The Official Guide
- Language: English
- Series: The Twilight Saga
- Genre: Fantasy
- Publisher: Little, Brown
- Publication date: April 12, 2011
- Publication place: United States
- Media type: Print (Hardcover, Paperback) e-Book (Kindle)
- Pages: 576
- ISBN: 978-0-316-04312-0

The Twilight Saga: The Official Illustrated Guide (previously titled The Official Guide) is a spin-off encyclopedic reference book for the Twilight Saga book series, written by Stephenie Meyer and was released on April 12, 2011. The Guide includes exclusive new material about the world Meyer created in Twilight, New Moon, Eclipse, Breaking Dawn and The Short Second Life of Bree Tanner, and nearly a hundred full-color illustrations by illustrator Young Kim, who previously illustrated Meyer's #1 New York Times Best Seller Twilight: The Graphic Novel, and several other artists.

== Pre-release history ==
=== Development ===
On September 11, 2010, Meyer announced in a fan junket with the fansite Twifans.com that she was still working on the Guide since 2008, and that it keeps evolving. She spoke of it saying that it was interesting because there were many unauthorized guides getting published containing a lot of misinformation, and she saw it as her mission to correct those wrong ideas and therefore write the guide.

In the press release of The Short Second Life of Bree Tanner, Meyer said that she started writing about Bree when editing Eclipse and intended to publish the story in The Guide. However, it turned out to be 192 pages in print which was too long to fit into The Guide, so her publisher suggested publishing it as a stand-alone novella.

The Guide includes character profiles, outtakes, a conversation with Meyer, genealogical charts, maps, extensive cross-references and nearly 100 illustrations and photographs by several artists, including Young Kim.

=== Publication date delays ===
Originally set for release on December 30, 2008, The Guide's release date was indefinitely postponed in 2008 due to Meyer not having enough time to write because she was immersed in the production of The Twilight Saga films. In 2009, some rumors circulated that The Guide would be released on December 30 of that year, while others said that it would be released on December 30, 2010; both of those rumors turned out to be false.

Finally, Little, Brown settled the matter in The Short Second Life of Bree Tanner press release by confirming that they would announce the release date of The Guide later in 2010.

== Promotion ==
On January 12, 2011, Little, Brown Books for Young Readers announced that it will host a special International Fan Event, featuring The Twilight Saga fans from around the world where ten fans would be chosen, by sweepstakes, to have an intimate meeting with Meyer and would receive an advance copy of The Guide. It also announced that the details about the event's location and photos from the event would be distributed upon the event's conclusion.

Promoting The Guide, on March 31, 2011, USA Today released a teaser of an article about Meyer's upcoming projects and her work as a producer on The Twilight Saga: Breaking Dawn that would be released the next day. On April 1, USA Today released the whole article with an interview that covered the international fan event that took place in Vancouver where Meyer was attending the sets of Breaking Dawn as a producer. The article quoted Meyer saying that her favorite part in The Guide "is the vampire histories. There's a lot there that's new. Alice's (Cullen) back story is one no one has known until now. And I think fans will be surprised at how much fun (Cullen nemesis) Victoria's story is."

On April 7, Entertainment Weekly magazine released a sneak peek including two pictures from The Guide, one of them featuring Bella as a vampire with golden eyes, and the other featuring her in her wedding dress. The following day, Little, Brown released another scan of James' character profile.
