= Renesmee =

Renesmee can refer to:

- Renesmee Carlie Cullen, a character in the novel Breaking Dawn by Stephenie Meyer.
- Renesmee (name), the given name invented for the character.
