= Renesmee (given name) =

Female given name

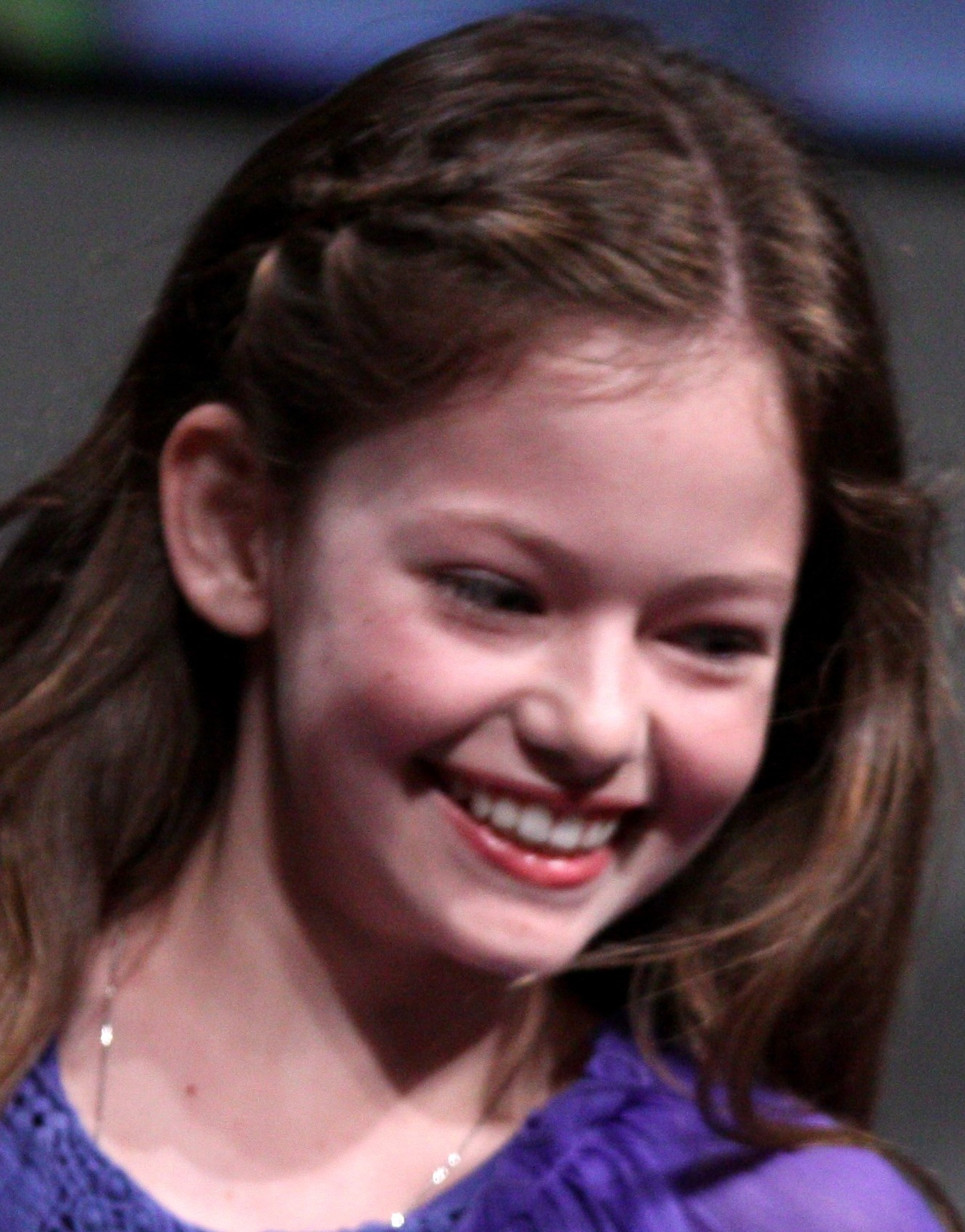
- Actress Mackenzie Foy portrayed Renesmee Cullen in the 2012 film Breaking Dawn – Part 2.
- Pronunciation: /rəˈnɛzmeɪ/ Ruh-NEZ-may
- Gender: female

Origin
- Meaning: created, literary name, derived from a combination of Renee and Esmé, meaning reborn and loved respectively.

Other names
- Related names: Renesme, Renée, Esmé

Renesmee (French: Renésmée) is a feminine given name created by Twilight author Stephenie Meyer for a character in Breaking Dawn, the 2008 fourth novel in the Twilight series, who also appeared in the films based on the novels. It is a portmanteau of the names Renee (French: Renée) and Esme (French: Esmé), which are French in origin. The name, along with others used in the series, came into occasional use as a given name due to the popularity of the books and movies. Alternate spellings of the name are also found.

== History ==
=== Background ===
In 2008, the fourth and final novel in the Twilight Saga series of paranormal romance novels, Breaking Dawn, introduced Renesmee Carlie Cullen, the half-human, half-vampire daughter of the series' two romantic leads, Bella Swan and Edward Cullen. After Bella and Edward marry, Renesmee is conceived during the couple's honeymoon. Discovering that she is miraculously pregnant with a half-vampire child, Bella decides to name the baby "Renesmee" if a girl, after her two grandmothers Renée Dwyer and Esme Cullen. (Note: She also gives the child the middle name Carlie after grandfathers Charlie Swan and Carlisle Cullen. If the child had been a boy she would have named it "Edward Jacob" ("E.J."), after her husband, Edward Cullen, and best friend, Jacob Black.)

=== Usage ===
While use of the name has sometimes proven controversial, it is in regular use in English-speaking countries. While the name has never ranked among the "Top 1,000" baby names used for newborn girls in the United States, the name has seen steady usage for American girls since 2009, the first year it was given to five or more newborn American girls. There were 165 newborn American girls given the name in 2022, 136 newborn American girls called Renesmee in 2023, 173 newborn American girls called Renesmee in 2024, and 138 newborn American girls given the name in 2025. Other spellings of the name in regular use in the United States include Ranezmae, Renesmae, Renesme, Renessmae, Renezmae, and Renezmay. It tripled in use in the United Kingdom between 2011, the year five newborn girls in England and Wales were given the name, and 2013, when 18 newborn girls there were given the name. The name continued to increase in usage and ranked among the top 1,000 names given to newborn girls in the United Kingdom between 2017 and 2020. It has also been in occasional use for newborn girls in Canada since at least 2013. Increased usage of the name in 2013 coincided with the 2012 release of the film Breaking Dawn – Part 2.

=== Meyer's reaction ===
In 2012, Stephenie Meyer stated in an interview with Entertainment Weekly, "I am someone who strongly believes in reality, and that you don't monkey around with people's names. Whether they become a stripper or a lawyer has a large part to do with the name you give them. I would never name a real child Renesmee. But in fantasy, you can name your characters anything you want. I couldn't have named [Bella and Edward's] child Lindsay. I couldn't have named her anything that already exists – it would have felt wrong. I had to pick a name that I felt was completely and totally unique, which opens you up to heckling. Which I've taken. I take all my heckling, and I totally get it!" When the interviewer pointed out that "someone is probably naming their real-life child 'Renesmee' even as we speak", Meyer said, "Well, that really disturbs me."

Meyer later explained on her website, "Well, I couldn't call her Jennifer or Ashley. What do you name the most unique baby in the world? I looked through a lot of baby name websites. Eventually I realized that there was no human name that was going to work for me, so I surrendered to necessity and made up my own. I don't approve of such shenanigans in real life, I don't even believe in getting creative with spellings for real kids! But this was fantasy, and no human name fit, so I did the best I could. I named Renesmee so long ago—Fall 2003—that the name now sounds really natural to me. It wasn't until people started mentioning it that I remembered, 'Oh, yeah, it is a weird name, isn't it?'"
