= Twilight (Meyer novel) =

First novel in the Twilight Saga by Stephenie Meyer

- Cover of Twilight
- Author: Stephenie Meyer
- Original title: Forks
- Cover artist: Gail Doobinin (design); Roger Hagadone (photograph)
- Language: English
- Series: Twilight series
- Genre: Young adult, fantasy, romance, vampire
- Publisher: Little, Brown and Company
- Publication date: October 5, 2005 (hardcover); September 6, 2006 (softcover); February 26, 2009 (kindle); May 1, 2009 (audible)
- Publication place: United States
- Media type: Print (Hardcover, Paperback); e-Book (Kindle); Audio Book (CD)
- Pages: 498 (Hardcover); 544 (Paperback)
- ISBN: 978-0-316-16017-9
- Followed by: New Moon

Twilight (stylized as twilight) is a 2005 young adult vampire-romance novel by author Stephenie Meyer. It is the first book in the Twilight series, and introduces seventeen-year-old Isabella "Bella" Swan, who moves from Phoenix, Arizona, to Forks, Washington. She is endangered after falling in love with Edward Cullen, a 103-year-old vampire frozen in his 17-year-old body. Additional novels in the series are New Moon, Eclipse, and Breaking Dawn.

Twilight reached number five on the New York Times bestseller list within a month of its release and eventually reached first place. The novel was named one of Publishers Weekly's Best Children's Books of 2005. The book was the biggest-selling of 2008; in 2009, it was the second-biggest selling, losing only to its sequel New Moon. As of 2008, Twilight had been translated into 37 different languages.

The film adaptation, released in 2008, was a commercial success, grossing more than $392 million worldwide and making an additional $157 million in North American DVD sales as of July 2009.

== Plot ==
Bella Swan, an introverted seventeen-year-old girl, moves from Phoenix, Arizona, to Forks, Washington, on the Olympic Peninsula to live with her father, the town's police chief, after her mother begins life on the road with her new husband, a minor-league baseball player. Bella is admitted to Forks High School, where she easily settles in with a group of friends. A somewhat inexperienced and shy girl, Bella is dismayed by several boys competing for her attention.

On the first day of school, Bella sits next to her classmate Edward Cullen during biology class, but he seems to be utterly repulsed by her, much to her bewilderment. He disappears for a week but when he returns, he is unexpectedly friendly to Bella. Their newfound relationship is interrupted after Bella is nearly struck by a van in the school parking lot. Edward saves Bella, narrowly stopping the van with his bare hands. Bella questions Edward about how he saved her life but he refuses to tell her anything.

During a visit to First Beach, Bella meets Jacob Black, a local boy from the Quileute tribe. She learns that Edward and the rest of the Cullen family are "cold ones" (vampires) who consume only animal blood. Disturbed by recurring nightmares, Bella researches vampires. She compares the characteristics of the vampires in mythology to the Cullens and becomes convinced that Edward is a vampire.

Bella is saved by Edward again in Port Angeles when she is almost attacked by a group of men. Furious, Edward drives Bella away and takes her to a restaurant for dinner and then back home. Edward confesses that he is able to read minds. Everyone's mind, that is, but Bella's. On the way, she tells him she knows that he is a vampire. Edward confirms her belief and confesses that Bella's blood is more desirable to him than anyone else's and he wanted to kill her on the first day of school. He tried to stay away from Bella to avoid hurting her, but over time, Edward and Bella fell in love.

Their relationship is affected when a nomadic vampire coven arrives in Forks. James, a tracker vampire, who is intrigued by Cullen's relationship with a human, wants to hunt Bella for sport. Bella and Edward are forced to separate as Bella escapes with Alice and Jasper (Edward's brother and sister) to hide in a hotel in Phoenix.

James calls Bella and claims to be holding her mother hostage. Bella sneaks out and hurries to save her mother. When she arrives, she finds that the hostage claim was a ruse. James attacks and bites her, but before he can kill her, she is rescued by Edward and the other Cullens, who kill James. Edward prevents Bella from becoming a vampire by sucking the venom out of her wound, and she is treated at a hospital, using the story that she fell out of a window as an excuse.

After they return to Forks, Edward takes her to the school prom, as Edward did not want Bella to miss any normal human experience because of him. Bella says that she wants to be transformed into a vampire, but Edward reiterates he is against this.

== Main characters ==
- Isabella "Bella" Swan - A 17-year-old girl who moves from Phoenix, Arizona, to Forks, Washington, to live with her father. Her mother moves to Florida with her second husband. Bella has a kind and awkward personality that is more mature than most girls her age. She is intelligent and observant, noticing and formulating theories about the Cullens' strange behaviors, physical features, and unusual abilities. Bella acts selfless by prioritizing the safety of her peers over herself.As the novel progresses, Bella unconsciously learns how to make difficult choices and accept their consequences. She enjoys reading traditional books of literature such as Romeo and Juliet and Wuthering Heights.
- Charlie Swan - Bella Swan's father who lives in Forks, Washington. He works as the head of police for the town. His parenting style can be described as authoritative. Charlie sets rules and expectations for Bella, but he allows some flexibility.
- Edward Cullen - A 103-year-old vampire who was transformed by Carlisle Cullen when he was near death with Spanish flu in 1918. He has a supernatural gift for reading people's minds. However, he cannot read Bella's thoughts. Since Edward's transformation into a vampire, he had never fallen in love nor believed that he needed to. He later realizes that his existence was completely pointless and without an aim. However, the day he meets Bella, his life changes. In Bella, he finds compassion, love, acceptance, and care. In Twilight, Edward has a pessimistic personality influenced by Meyer's naturally pessimistic character. Additionally, Edward acts very protective of Bella because he believes she is "a magnet for trouble". His character was also influenced by Mr. Rochester from Jane Eyre.
- Alice Cullen - A member of the Cullen vampire clan who remembers little about her human existence. Similar to Edward Cullen, Alice has supernatural power; she has the ability to predict the future. Her visions change as the people around her make decisions. Additionally, her insights can be limited when it comes to Bella. Alice claims Bella feels like a sister to her.
- Esme Cullen - A vampire and the wife of Carlisle Cullen who acts as a mother figure to Alice, Emmett, Rosalie, Jasper, and Edward. She has a caring and warm personality.
- Jasper Cullen - The youngest of the Cullen vampire clan who has the ability to feel and control the emotions of those around him. Throughout the book, Jasper uses this gift to help Bella remain calm.
- Mike Newton - He is one of Bella's first friends in Forks. A few chapters into the book, he reveals he has a crush on Bella. After Bella lets him down, he asks Jessica to attend the dance with him. He acts jealous when Bella begins dating Edward.
- Jessica Stanley - A girl who is friends with Mike and Angela. She becomes one of Bella's new friends. Jessica can be described as loquacious. When Bella shows interest in the Cullens, Jessica becomes jealous and passive-aggressive.
- James - A vampire with an unusual ability to track people. When the Cullens try to protect Bella, James figures she will be the biggest hunt of his life.
- Jacob Black - A non-vampire, Quileute who lives on the La Push reservation near Forks. Upon first meeting, Bella is charmed and impressed by Jacob in many ways. Jacob learns that he is similar to Bella in many ways. Her father Charlie sees that Jacob is safe boyfriend material, the kind of guy he would approve of her dating.
- Carlisle Cullen - A handsome, conscientious doctor. As the patriarch of the Cullen clan, Carlisle started the practice of a 'vegetarian' (no human) diet. As a human in the 17th century, Carlisle was the son of an anti-'evil-being' pastor.

== Development ==
Meyer has claimed that the idea for Twilight came to her on June 2, 2003 in a dream about a human girl who loved a vampire, who loved her but still wanted her blood. Meyer reports that she wrote the draft of what became Chapter 13 of the book inspired by the dream. The first drafts were titled Forks instead of Twilight; the publisher requested the title change. Meyer eventually named the main characters Edward, influenced by Edward Rochester from Charlotte Brontë's Jane Eyre and Edward Ferrars from Jane Austen's Sense and Sensibility, and Isabella, thinking she would have chosen that for a daughter. Rosalie and Jasper were originally named Carol and Ronald.

She reports that she completed the novel in three months. She finished the manuscript on August 29, 2003.

Her sister encouraged Meyer to send the manuscript to literary agencies. Meyer sent out letters to literary agents inquiring if they would be interested in a 130,000-word manuscript about teenage vampires. Of the 15 letters she wrote, five went unanswered, nine brought rejections, and the last was a positive response from Jodi Reamer of Writers House. An inexperienced assistant at Writers House responded to her inquiry, not knowing that young adult books are expected to be about 40,000 to 60,000 words in length. Due to that error, Reamer eventually read Meyer's manuscript and signed her up as a client. During the editing process, a chapter that used to be Chapter 20 was cut out of the manuscript along with Emmett's account of his bear attack and some parts of the epilogue.

== Cover ==
Stephenie Meyer has said the apple on the cover represents the forbidden fruit from the Book of Genesis and Bella and Edward's forbidden love. She uses a quote from Genesis 2:17 at the beginning of the book. It also represents Bella's knowledge of good and evil and the choices she makes. Meyer says, "It asks if you are going to bite in and discover the frightening possibilities around you or refuse and stay safe in the comfortable world you know." A later alternative cover features Kristen Stewart and Robert Pattinson, the actors who play the lead characters in the film adaptation.

== Awards and honors ==
- Among Publishers Weekly's "Best Children's Books of 2005"
- Among School Library Journal's "Best Books of 2005"

== Publication ==
Eight publishers competed for the rights to publish Twilight in the 2003 auction. Little, Brown and Company originally bid for $300,000, but Meyer's agent asked for $1 million; the publishers finally settled on $750,000 for three books. Twilight was published in 2005 with a print run of 75,000 copies. It debuted at #5 on the New York Times Best Seller list within a month of its release, and later peaked at #1. Foreign rights to the novel were sold to over 26 countries.

In October 2008, Twilight was ranked #26 in USA Today's list of "Bestselling Books of Last 15 Years". Later, the book went on to become the best-selling book of 2008. and the second biggest selling of 2009, only behind its sequel New Moon.

In October 2015, the tenth anniversary, Meyer announced a new gender-swapped version of the novel, entitled Life and Death: Twilight Reimagined, with characters Beau (a male human) and Edythe (a female vampire), in honor of the 10th anniversary of The Twilight Saga.

On August 4, 2020, Meyer released the Twilight companion piece Midnight Sun. Midnight Sun is the story of Twilight as told from Edward Cullen's perspective.

== Critical reception ==
The New York Times review stated, "The premise of Twilight is attractive and compelling — who hasn't fantasized about unearthly love with a beautiful stranger? — but the book suffers at times from overearnest, amateurish writing. A little more "showing" and a lot less "telling" might have been a good thing, especially some pruning to eliminate the constant references to Edward's shattering beauty and Bella's undying love."

The Kirkus review noted that, "[Twilight] is far from perfect: Edward's portrayal as monstrous tragic hero is overly Byronic, and Bella's appeal is based on magic rather than character. Nonetheless, the portrayal of dangerous lovers hits the spot; fans of dark romance will find it hard to resist."

Publishers Weekly's starred review described Bella's "infatuation with outsider Edward", their risky relationship, and "Edward's inner struggle" as a metaphor for sexual frustration accompanying adolescence.

Elizabeth Hand said in a review for the Washington Post, "Meyer's prose seldom rises above the serviceable, and the plotting is leaden".

The Times praised the book for capturing "perfectly the teenage feeling of sexual tension and alienation". Hillias J. Martin of School Library Journal addresses the appeal of the novel to be due to its clear and understandable nature, allowing readers to become fully engaged Norah Piehl of TeenReads also wrote, "Twilight is a gripping blend of romance and horror".

Booklist wrote, "There are some flaws here–a plot that could have been tightened, an over reliance on adjectives and adverbs to bolster dialogue–but this dark romance seeps into the soul."

Christopher Middleton of The Daily Telegraph called the book a "high school drama with a bloody twist ... no secret, of course, at whom this book is aimed, and no doubt, either, that it has hit its mark".

Although the Daily Telegraph later listed Twilight at number 32 on its list of "100 books that defined the noughties", it said that the novel was "Astonishing, mainly for the ineptitude of [Meyer's] prose".

Jennifer Hawes of The Post and Courier said, "Twilight, the first book in Stephenie Meyer's series, gripped me so fiercely that I called the nearest teenager I know and begged for her copy after I misplaced my own."

Roberta Goli of Suite101.com wrote that while "the first half of the novel lacks action", the writing is "fluid" and the story "interesting". She also praised the depth of emotion shown between the main characters for pinpointing "the angst of teenage love."

=== Book challenges ===
Twilight was on the American Library Association Top Ten List of the Most Frequently Challenged Books of 2010, for containing a "religious viewpoint" and "violence". The Twilight series was on the same list in 2009 for being "sexually explicit", "unsuited to age group", and having a "religious viewpoint". The Marshall University Libraries pinpoint specific reasons several schools have removed the novel from libraries, citing the hyper-sexual nature of the novel, as well as religious objections to the plot.

== Legacy ==
=== Sequels ===
The second book, New Moon, was originally published in the US on August 21, 2006. Eclipse was published on August 7, 2007. The fourth and final novel, Breaking Dawn, is the longest book in the original tetralogy at 756 pages in the US hardcover version, and 700 pages in the US paperback release. It was published worldwide on August 2, 2008, and sold over 1.3 million copies in the first 24 hours of its release in the US.

Furthermore, on June 5, 2010, Meyer published The Short Second Life of Bree Tanner.This book dives into Bree Tanner's experience as a new vampire. Then, on October 6, 2015, she released Life and Death, a retelling of Twilight with reversed gender roles. Most recently, Meyer released Midnight Sun on August 4, 2020, which retells Twilight from Edward Cullen's point of view.

=== Manga version ===
A manga-style Japanese language version of the Twilight saga was released in 13 installments. The books, which were primarily text, featured illustrated pages of art sprinkled throughout the book.

=== Film version ===
Twilight was adapted as a film by Summit Entertainment. The film was directed by Catherine Hardwicke and stars Kristen Stewart and Robert Pattinson as protagonists Bella and Edward. The screenplay was adapted by Melissa Rosenberg. The movie was released in theaters in the United States on November 21, 2008, and on DVD on March 21, 2009. The DVD was released in Australia on April 22, 2009.

=== Graphic novel version ===
On July 15, 2009, Entertainment Weekly confirmed rumors that a graphic novel adaptation of Twilight was in development. The book was drawn by Korean artist Young Kim and published by Yen Press. Stephenie Meyer reviewed every panel herself. According to EW, "it doesn't look simply like an artist's rendering of Kristen Stewart and Rob Pattinson. In fact, the characters seem to be an amalgam of Meyer's literary imagination and the actors' actual looks." EW magazine published finished illustrations of Edward, Bella, and Jacob in their July 17, 2009 issue. The first part of the graphic novel was released on March 16, 2010.
