= The Short Second Life of Bree Tanner =

2010 novella by Stephenie Meyer

- Author: Stephenie Meyer
- Series: Twilight series
- Genre: Young adult, fantasy
- Publisher: Little, Brown
- Publication date: 2 June 2010 (kindle) 5 June 2010 (hardcover) 1 July 2010 (CD) 29 August 2011 (paperback)
- Publication place: United States
- Media type: Print (Hardcover, Paperback) e-Book (Kindle); Audio Book (CD)
- Pages: 178 (Hardcover)
- ISBN: 1-907410-36-8

The Short Second Life of Bree Tanner is a novella in the Twilight series by author Stephenie Meyer. It tells the story of a newborn vampire, Bree Tanner, who is featured in the third book of the series, Eclipse (2007). The book is written from the viewpoint of Bree, as opposed to the rest of the series which is predominantly narrated by character Bella Swan. Meyer let director David Slade, screenwriter Melissa Rosenberg, and a few of the actors read a draft of the story during production of the 2010 film The Twilight Saga: Eclipse.

== Plot summary ==
The story begins with Bree and Diego hunting for human blood in Seattle, Washington. Bree has been a vampire for three months, and Diego has been one for eleven months. Together they kill a pimp and two prostitutes and drink their blood. Bree and Diego discuss "her" (Victoria, who turned them into vampires). They hide in a cave and discuss their human lives, and how Riley came to offer them a second life as vampires. Together they decide that Riley is using them as pawns, and that he might be lying to them. They also discover that sunlight does not kill a vampire, but makes their skin sparkle. They fall in love and hunt for Riley and the other vampires they live with.

They find that Riley had relocated everyone to a log cabin and Diego gets into a fight. That night Bree and Diego stalk Riley, suspicious that he is meeting with "her." They eavesdrop on Riley's conversation with Victoria.

Eventually the Volturi show up, threatening to punish Victoria for amassing a vampire army, but are willing to give her army a chance to destroy the Cullen clan. The Volturi say that if Victoria does not attack within five days, they will kill her.

Bree returns to the log cabin and resolves to run away, while Diego stays behind to talk to Riley and inform him about the fact that the sunlight doesn't hurt them. Riley returns to the cabin alone and tells his vampire army that there are older vampires in Seattle (the Cullens) who want to kill them. If the newborns want to survive, Riley explains, they will have to work together and learn how to fight. Riley spots Bree and tells her that Diego is doing surveillance work with "her" and will return to join them in the fight. After three nights of training, Bree and the other vampires attack a ferry boat filled with passengers and drink their blood to increase their strength for the battle against the elder vampires. Riley tells everyone that the vampires they will be fighting have yellow eyes and keep a human (Bella) as a pet. He then gives them Bella's scent to hunt, describing her as the dessert.

The newborn army heads off to fight the Cullens. Fred decides to run away to Vancouver before the battle and agrees to wait for Bree for a day before leaving. Bree decides to take part in the battle in order to find Diego. Before the battle, Riley retreats, claiming to have business elsewhere and telling Bree that Diego already started fighting. Bree arrives at the battle to find the newborn vampires being massacred by the Cullens and thinks Diego is already dead because she cannot see or smell him anywhere. She concludes Victoria and Riley killed Diego for disobedience the night he went missing.

Bree turns to flee, but is cornered by Carlisle Cullen. They are joined by Jasper and Esme Cullen, who debate whether or not to kill her - the former wanting to, the latter not. They decide to restrain her until the Volturi arrive. Jasper forces her to close her eyes and presses his hands over her ears in order to protect the secret of the werewolves ("howler vampires", as Bree calls them), because she can hear their howls.

Bree then spots Bella, and has trouble resisting the urge to drink her blood (a scene originally shown in Eclipse). The Volturi (dark-cloaks) then show up and Bree starts logically concluding facts about the Cullens from what she sees and the conversation she and Diego overheard. She correctly deduces that Edward Cullen is the mindreader and informs him of what Jane told Victoria to do. Jane is dissatisfied with their explanations and interrogates Bree, torturing her.

Bree pretends to be dumb, pleading that Riley lied to her and the other newborns, that they were ignorant and did as they were told, under fear of death. The Volturi decide to kill Bree. Carlisle and Edward attempt to save her by saying they will teach her the rules, but Bree sees this is futile. Jane refuses to give second chances, arguing it would adversely affect the Volturi reputation as law enforcers among the vampires. She also warns that Caius would be interested in learning that Bella is still human, as he sees her as a threat to vampire secrecy. Bree does not fully understand this argument and simply yearns for her life and torment to be over since Diego is dead. Jane then orders her death. Edward advises Bella to shut her eyes, but Bree believes this warning is meant for her instead. She shuts her eyes and is killed.

== Characters ==
- Bree Tanner: The narrator of the story. She was 15, almost 16, when she became a vampire. Bree was introduced as a three-month-old newborn vampire in Eclipse. Bree's father had been hitting her after her mother left them. She ran away from home and was living in the streets of Seattle when Riley found her. She was starving, and either ate out of garbage cans, or attempted to steal food. Riley asked, "Want a burger, kid?" and then took her to Victoria who turned her into a vampire. Bree, like other newborn vampires, believed in the urban vampire stories and was afraid of the sun and wooden stakes. Later when Diego showed her they were not true, she was relieved, but wasn't sure if they should tell Riley and the two fell in love with each other. She did not trust Riley that much. Bree is confused in Riley's true plans and tries to figure out the truth with Diego. She also doesn't know all the rules of the vampire world because Riley never explained to any of the newborns. She likes to read. Bree could have run away from the fight and left with Fred but she went back to look for Diego. Bree surrenders to the Cullens, but in the end the Volturi destroy her.
- Diego: Bree's friend, who eventually falls in love with her and is alluded to be her "mate." He was 18 when he was turned into a vampire. He was trapped in an alley when he killed the leader of a gang who killed his brother. He was rescued by Riley, who offered him a new life. Diego considers Riley, besides Bree, one of his best friends and trusts him, but he still doubts Riley's motives. Diego confronts Riley on the urban vampire stories about the sun burning them telling Riley it wasn't true. It is suggested that Riley and Victoria brutally killed Diego.
- Riley Biers: The leader of the newborns. He gets his orders from Victoria. He is responsible for finding troubled children and bringing them to Victoria so she can change them into vampires. He is described by Bree as beautiful, just like all vampires are. At first she likes him, but after she has been changed into a vampire, she becomes distrustful and suspicious of him. Riley is said to be very fond of Diego and in love with Victoria.
- 'Freaky' Fred: Develops friendship with Bree. Fred has the power to repel others by making them feel repulsed by him. This is an illusion and therefore would not affect Bella. He uses this to keep other newborns away from him. Because of this they call him Freaky Fred. Bree has a habit of hiding behind him to keep herself away from the attention of Raoul and Kristie and their gangs. Fred is also described as handsome, has blond hair, and looked like his age is of a college student. Among all the vampires who have decided to fight, he is the only one who decides to run away. He asks Bree to join him but she decides to first go back to find Diego.
- Raoul: One of the leaders of a gang of newborns. Bree strongly dislikes him. He seems to have the power to attract people, although this power only seems to work on people who are dimwitted. He is very competitive and definitely not the smartest. He and his gang have a rivalry with Kristie and her gang until Riley forces everyone to work together against the Cullens.
- Victoria: Victoria gives Riley orders to create an army to battle the Cullen clan plus Bella. She gives directions which includes telling lies to the newborns but she also lies to Riley which is exposed in Eclipse: Victoria pretends to love Riley when she truly loved James (the reason for creating the vampire army). During the battle, she and Riley are destroyed by Edward Cullen and Seth Clearwater, respectively. Bree and the rest of the newborns have never met Victoria, their creator. Riley tells the newborns it is to protect themselves and that their minds were not safe but it was not totally true. Though the newborns' thoughts were not safe, the newborns could not see Victoria for her safety, not theirs, due to Alice's ability to read the future. Alice was focused on Victoria's choices but was not 'tuned in' to the newborns. Victoria had known about Alice's power.

== Publication history ==
=== Development ===
According to Stephenie Meyer, she began writing the story while she was editing Eclipse. Later, she planned on including it in the upcoming The Twilight Saga: The Official Guide:

"This story was something that I worked on off and on for a while, just for fun, in between the times I was writing or editing other Twilight novels. Later, when the concept for The Twilight Saga: The Official Guide came up, I thought that might be a good place for Bree. Her story is a nice complement to Eclipse; it explains a lot of the things that Bella never knew. So I dusted it off and finished it up for placement in the Guide."

The resulting story became too long to be included in the Guide, and so it became a stand-alone book.

=== Release ===
The Short Second Life of Bree Tanner had an initial print run of 1.5 million copies. It was released in stores on June 5, 2010, and was available for free viewing from June 7 to July 5 on the book's official website. For every book sold, one dollar will be donated to the American Red Cross to support relief efforts in Haiti and Chile. For those who take advantage of the free viewing there would be an option for the individual to make a donation as well. The online version of the book was for viewing only and not offered as a download.

Two weeks after its release, The Short Second Life of Bree Tanner was on USA Today's best-seller list. Publisher Little, Brown estimated that 700,000 copies were sold in the United States, and 75,000 people read the entire book online for free. Bree Tanner also became one of the fastest selling books in the UK having sold 89,549 copies, at an average of 79 copies per minute, in less than nineteen hours. It is also the third fastest selling hardback title in the UK, behind Harry Potter and the Deathly Hallows and The Lost Symbol. In its first full week in the UK, it sold 136,995 copies and was described as an "incredible achievement for a book that has been free to view online" and making Meyer the second most successful young fiction author in the UK market, behind JK Rowling.

=== Tie-in with movie ===
In 2009, Summit Entertainment approached author Stephenie Meyer to ask for a draft of the book for The Twilight Saga: Eclipse. Meyer gave a draft to the cast and crew of the film to get to know more about Bree. Meyer also gave a copy to screenwriter Melissa Rosenberg. The book was subsequently made part of the Eclipse movie.

== Reception ==
Fox News described the book as a "riveting story" and commented, "In another irresistible combination of danger, mystery, and romance, Stephenie Meyer tells the devastating story of Bree and the newborn army as they prepare to close in on Bella Swan and the Cullens, following their encounter to its unforgettable conclusion." USA Today also responded with a positive review and noted, "Reading Bree's story enriches our reading of the Twilight saga and will enhance enjoyment of the Eclipse movie".
