= Breaking Dawn =

Fourth novel in the Twilight Saga by Stephenie Meyer

- Author: Stephenie Meyer
- Cover artist: Gail Doobinin (design); Roger Hagadone (photo)
- Language: English
- Series: Twilight series
- Genre: Paranormal romance, young adult fiction, vampire fiction
- Publisher: Little, Brown and Company
- Publication date: August 2, 2008 (US hardcover); August 4, 2008 (hardcover); February 26, 2009 (kindle)
- Publication place: United States
- Media type: Print (Hardcover, Paperback) e-Book (Kindle); Audio Book (CD)
- Pages: 756 (hardcover), 700 (paperback)
- ISBN: 0-316-06792-X
- Preceded by: Eclipse
- Followed by: Midnight Sun

Breaking Dawn (stylized as breaking dawn) is the 2008 fourth novel in The Twilight Saga by American author Stephenie Meyer. Divided into three parts, the first and third sections are written from Bella Swan's perspective, and the second is written from the perspective of Jacob Black. The novel directly follows the events of the previous novel, Eclipse, as Bella and Edward Cullen get married, leaving behind a heartbroken Jacob. When Bella faces unexpected and life-threatening situations, she willingly risks her human life and possible vampire immortality.

Meyer finished an outline of the book in 2003, but developed and changed it as she wrote New Moon and Eclipse, though the main and most significant storylines remained unchanged. Little, Brown and Company took certain measures to prevent the book's contents from leaking, such as closing forums and message boards on several fansites and providing a special e-mail address for fans to send in links to leaks and spoilers online.

Breaking Dawn was released on August 2, 2008 at midnight release parties in over 4,000 bookstores throughout the US. From its initial print run of 3.7 million copies, over 1.3 million were sold in the US and 20,000 in the UK in the first 24 hours of the book's release, setting a record in first-day sales performance for the Hachette Book Group USA. The book was highly successful, selling over 6 million copies in 2008, and was the third best-selling novel of 2008 behind Twilight and New Moon.

Unlike the series' previous three entries, Breaking Dawn received mixed reviews from critics. It is also the most controversial book of the series, as adult themes and concepts are explored more directly than in its predecessors. However, the novel was awarded the British Book Award for "Children's Book of the Year". It was translated in 38 languages with rights sold to over 50 countries. The book has been adapted into a two-part movie, with the first part released on November 18, 2011, and the second part released on November 16, 2012.

== Plot summary ==
After Bella's marriage with Edward, they spend their honeymoon on Isle Esme, a private island off the coast of Brazil that Carlisle owns. Two weeks into their honeymoon, Edward and Bella have sex for the first time, and Bella becomes pregnant. Because the fetus is part-vampire, her pregnancy progresses at an accelerated rate, causing Bella severe physical and emotional distress. Bella and Edward return home to Forks, Washington.

Knowing of Bella's wish to become a vampire, Jacob is suspicious when she returns from her honeymoon and the Cullens keep her father, Charlie, from seeing her. Believing the Cullens broke their treaty not to bite another human, he advances on their home intending to kill Edward. Jacob visits the Cullen residence and seeing the state Bella is in due to her pregnancy, begs Bella to abort the fetus to save her own life, as neither Carlisle, a doctor, nor Alice who can see the future, are optimistic about Bella's prognosis.

Despite concerns that her pregnancy will be fatal, Bella refuses to terminate it, believing she can survive long enough to give birth and then be transformed into a vampire. As the wolves are telepathic, they hear Jacob's thoughts about Bella. Fearing Bella will give birth to an uncontrollable, bloodthirsty child, they decide to kill her and the fetus. Jacob accepts his bloodline as the true pack leader to break free from the alpha, Sam's control. He goes to warn the Cullens that the wolf pack plans to kill Bella. En route, Seth Clearwater, a younger pack member, also breaks away and joins Jacob. Having formed their own pack, the two discover they can no longer hear the other wolves' thoughts. They begin patrolling the Cullens' property before Leah, Seth's older sister and the lone female wolf, joins them.

Bella goes into labor and the baby begins fighting its way out of her body, inflicting life threatening injuries on Bella. In an attempt to save Bella's life Edward performs an emergency cesarean section. As Bella is dying, Edward injects his venom into her heart. Jacob, believing Bella is dead, blames her baby, Renesmee. He goes to kill Renesmee but instead imprints (an involuntary response in which a shape-shifter finds his soul mate) on her.

After her painful transformation, Bella wakes to find herself changed into a vampire. Fully recovered, she enjoys her new life and vampire abilities. Renesmee grows rapidly into a toddler and is spotted at a distance by Irina, a vampire from the Alaskan coven. Misidentifying her as an "immortal child," a human child who is turned into an uncontrollable vampire, Irina presents her allegations to the Volturi who outlawed the creation of such creatures. As the largest and most powerful vampire coven, the Volturi see Renesmee and the Cullens as a threat and plot to destroy them. Foreseeing their arrival, the Cullens gather other vampire clans from around the world to stand as witnesses and prove that Renesmee is not an immortal child upon Alice's request. Jacob's imprinting on Renesmee forged an unbreakable bond and mutual protective pact between the Cullens and the Quileute, ending the hatred between them. As local and foreign vampires arrive, the Cullen house becomes the headquarters and training ground for the assorted vampires and the Quileute wolf packs. Bella learns that she is a 'shield', meaning the gifts of other vampires do not work on her, which is why Edward and Aro cannot read her mind. Bella works with the other vampires to improve her skill and shield people other than herself.

Upon confronting the gathered Cullen allies and witnesses, the Volturi discover that they were misinformed on Renesmee's identity. The Volturi execute Irina in an attempt to instigate a full battle but are unsuccessful. They bring up the Cullens' pact with the Quileute wolves and the uncertainty of Renesmee's future in an effort to further provoke hostilities, naming her as a threat to the secret existence of vampires. Alice and Jasper, who left prior to the gathering of the Cullen's allies, return with a Mapuche called Nahuel, a 150-year-old vampire-human hybrid like Renesmee. Alongside him is his biological aunt, Huilen, who explains that her sister fell in love with a vampire and became pregnant with his child, but died in childbirth. When Nahuel was born, he bit Huilen, turning her into a vampire. With Nahuel having proved that hybrids pose no threat to the existence of vampires, the Volturi agree to leave the Cullens alone. The Cullens and their allies leave in peace, realizing that the Volturi may one day return. While alone with Edward, Bella lowers her mental shield, allowing Edward to read her mind for the first time, sharing her thoughts and feelings for him.

== Background ==
=== Development ===
Originally, Meyer wrote a book titled Forever Dawn, which was a direct sequel to Twilight. While the basic storyline remained the same, Forever Dawn was narrated completely from Bella's point of view, the werewolves and Jacob were "only sketchily developed", Victoria and Laurent were both alive, and there was an epilogue. Meyer went on to say that she "may post some extras someday if I ever have time to go back through the Forever Dawn manuscript—it's just as long as Breaking Dawn."

The part that took Meyer the longest time to write in Breaking Dawn was the half-chapter describing the 3 months after Bella's transformation into a vampire because "the amount of time per word put into that section was probably ten times what it was in any other part of the book" and Meyer liked to write minute by minute, but didn't think it would be exciting.

Meyer decided to include the pregnancy in her story while she was researching vampires, early in 2003 and came across the legend of the incubus, a demon who could father children. Bella's insistence to not let her child die was inspired by Meyer's reaction when asked if she would let one of her children die so she could live, which was to deliver the child no matter what the consequences were. Meyer said in an interview with Shannon Hale, published in The Twilight Saga: The Official Illustrated Guide, that the birth scene published is a little less grotesque than the one she wrote before editing due to her editor, agent and publisher's requests to "tone down the violence a little". She stated that Bella's pregnancy and childbirth, for her, were "a way to kind of explore that concept of what childbirth used to be" in the past and acknowledged that they were "taking Bella in a new direction that wasn't [as] relatable for a lot of people." Concerning the subject of the relatability of Bella, Meyer admitted that she lost some of her relatability to the character when she became a vampire and said, "every point up until that point in the story [the transformation] I would say I could step into this story right here and I could do everything she could do which made it really fun." Meyer wanted to experience Bella's vampiric experiences and "enjoyed very much" writing about them and wanted to end the book from her perspective, but still thought it was "a little bit harder" as she couldn't step in into the story anymore.

In regard to Renesmee's unique name, Meyer wrote that she "couldn't call her Jennifer or Ashley. What do you name the most unique baby in the world? I looked through a lot of baby name websites. Eventually I realized that there was no human name that was going to work for me, so I surrendered to necessity and made up my own."

Meyer states in regard to ending the series:

The Twilight Saga is really Bella's story, and this was the natural place for her story to wind up. She overcame the major obstacles in her path and fought her way to the place she wanted to be. I suppose I could try to prolong her story unnaturally, but it wouldn't be interesting enough to keep me writing. Stories need conflict, and the conflicts that are Bella-centric are resolved.

=== Influences ===
The plays The Merchant of Venice and A Midsummer Night's Dream by William Shakespeare both influenced Breaking Dawn. Meyer decided that Alice would write her instruction to Bella on a page from The Merchant of Venice to give a clue that the final confrontation at the end of the book would be a mental one—not a physical battle—like the one at the end of the play. It also hints that the novel would have a happy ending for the couples, as in The Merchant of Venice. Originally it was the novel Jane Eyre by Charlotte Brontë that Alice tore a page from, but Jane Eyre had nothing to do with the story, so Meyer changed it.

The idea of imprinting, which existed in Forever Dawn, was inspired by A Midsummer Night's Dream. Meyer described it as "the magic of setting things right—which doesn't happen in the real world, which is absolutely fantasy", and decided to introduce it earlier–in Eclipse–so she wouldn't have to explain it later.

=== Cover art ===
Meyer described the cover as "extremely meaningful" and said that she was "really happy with how it turned out". The cover is a metaphor for Bella's progression throughout the entire series; she began as the physically weakest player on the board, the pawn, but at the end she becomes the strongest, the queen. The chessboard also hints at the conclusion of the novel "where the battle with the Volturi is one of wits and strategy, not physical violence."

=== Title ===
The title, Breaking Dawn, is a reference to the beginning of Bella's life as a newborn vampire. Wanting to add a "sense of disaster" to the title to match the novel's mood, she called it Breaking Dawn. Another reason for giving the book this particular title is that it matches the book's plot, which centers on "a new awakening and a new day and there's also a lot of problems inherent in it".

== Release ==
=== Marketing ===
Entertainment Weekly magazine released an excerpt of Breaking Dawn on May 30, 2008. Stephenie Meyer also revealed a 'Quote of the Day' from Breaking Dawn for about three weeks prior to its August 2, 2008 release. The first quote was released on Meyer's website on July 12, 2008. The first chapter of Breaking Dawn, "Engaged", was released in the special edition of Eclipse. Breaking Dawn was officially released on August 2, 2008 through midnight release parties in over 4,000 bookstores, most of which involved costume and trivia contests, crafts, and face painting.

Godiva also made a Twilight-themed chocolate bar, which was released in Barnes & Noble book stores at the release parties. A four-city Breaking Dawn Concert Series, featuring Stephenie Meyer and Blue October's Justin Furstenfeld, coincided with the novel's release. The concert series sold out three of its four locations on the day that tickets went on sale, selling out in under an hour in one city.

=== Publication ===
Prior to the novel's release, the first three Twilight books had already sold 8.5 million copies throughout the US and over 2 million copies in the UK. Breaking Dawn was one of the most anticipated books of 2008 with The Guardian noting, "Teenagers across the world are anxiously awaiting the next instalment of author Stephenie Meyer's vampiric series of novels." To meet the high demand, Little, Brown Books added a printing of 500,000 additional copies just prior to publication of the title, bringing the initial print run to 3.7 million.

The book sold 1.3 million copies in the US and 20,000 copies in the UK in its first 24 hours of release, as well as 100,000 copies in Canada during its first weekend. Breaking Dawn debuted at #1 on USA Today's top 150 best sellers list and has gone on to spend over 58 weeks on the list. It was also the biggest-selling children's book of 2008 with over 6 million copies sold.

A special edition of Breaking Dawn was released on August 4, 2009, containing a DVD of the Breaking Dawn Concert Series and an interview with Meyer.

== Reception ==
Critical reception of Breaking Dawn was mixed. Lev Grossman wrote, "First, since there's a lot of one-star reviews up on Amazon, let me say up front: I loved Breaking Dawn." Cara von Wrangel Kinsey of School Library Journal responded with a positive review, describing the book as "captivating" and noting, "While this novel is darker and more mature than the earlier titles, Meyer's twists and turns are not out of character." The Charlotte Observer agreed and called the book "pretty darned good", but criticized the book's length saying, "I wish [Stephenie Meyer] hadn't felt compelled to pack so much into one volume. It should have been two books." Mary Harris Russell of the Chicago Tribune also responded with a positive review and hailed the book as a "fun read", noting that Stephenie Meyer "continues to produce witty writing about families, teenagers and popular culture", while Time called the book "a wild but satisfying finish to the ballad of Bella and Edward" and gave it a rating of A−. An article in The Daily News Tribune said of Breaking Dawn, "Some of the dialog is a bit stilted,... but, if you stay close to Meyer's rich and prodigious narrative, you too might fall in love with its suspense and moving sensitivity".

Publishers Weekly stated that the main problem with Breaking Dawn was that, "Essentially, everyone gets everything they want, even if their desires necessitate an about-face in characterization or the messy introduction of some back story. Nobody has to renounce anything or suffer more than temporarily—in other words, grandeur is out." In an article by The Associated Press, journalist Sara Rose wrote on NewsOK.com that fans of the series would love "engaging characters, great humor, a distracting obsession with beauty, focus on the minutiae of emotions"; however "casual readers may be disappointed with a lot of build-up and little action." The Independent called the book, "shockingly, tackily, sick-makingly sexist" and said that "Bella Swan lives to serve men and suffer." Entertainment Weekly graded Breaking Dawn with a D, criticizing the birth scene and Bella's "unwavering passion for Edward" and having no other goals. The Washington Post also responded with a negative review, making comments such as, "Meyer has put a stake through the heart of her own beloved creation," and "Breaking Dawn has a childbirth sequence that may promote lifelong abstinence in sensitive types."

In an interview with Entertainment Weekly, Meyer responded to the negative response of many fans to the book and called it the "Rob Effect"; she said that the fans need time to accept the ending of Breaking Dawn, just as they needed time to accept Robert Pattinson playing the role of Edward in the Twilight movie.

=== Awards and honors ===
Breaking Dawn was the recipient of a British Book Award for "Children's Book of the Year". In the 2009 "Children's Choice Book Awards", the novel was chosen as "Teen Choice Book of the Year" and Meyer won the "Author of the Year" award.

== Film adaptations ==
Summit Entertainment announced in November 2008 that they had obtained the rights to the fourth book in Stephenie Meyer's series, Breaking Dawn. The studio greenlit an adaptation of The Twilight Saga: Breaking Dawn in April 2010. The film was split into two parts; the first part of the film was released on November 18, 2011, and the second part was released on November 16, 2012.

Bill Condon directed both parts; Stephenie Meyer co-produced the film along with Karen Rosenfelt and Wyck Godfrey. In July 2010, Summit announced that the film would be shot in Vancouver, Canada, and Baton Rouge, Louisiana. Maggie Grace plays the part of Irina in the film, while Mackenzie Foy plays Renesmee, Edward and Bella's half-vampire, half-human child. The infant Renesmee was portrayed by a robot. It was filmed at the Canadian Motion Picture Park Studios (CMPP).

The film did not follow the book strictly, as many of the scenes were created from scratch to add tension to the narrative.
