= Jacob Black =

Fictional character in the Twilight series

- Twilight character
- Jacob Black as portrayed by Taylor Lautner in New Moon.
- First appearance: Twilight
- Last appearance: Midnight Sun
- Created by: Stephenie Meyer
- Portrayed by: Taylor Lautner

In-universe information
- Nickname: Jake
- Species: Shape shifter/werewolf
- Gender: Male
- Title(s): Beta/Alpha's Second (New Moon and Eclipse), Alpha/Leader (Breaking Dawn)
- Occupation: Protector of La Push
- Family: Billy Black (father), Sarah Black (mother, deceased), Rachael and Rebecca (older twin sisters), Ephraim Black (great-grandfather, deceased), Quil Ateara V (second cousin)
- Significant other: Renesmee Cullen (imprinted)
- Nationality: Native American

Jacob Black is a character in the Twilight book series by Stephenie Meyer. He is described as an attractive Native American of the Quileute tribe in La Push, near Forks, Washington. In the second book of the series, New Moon, he discovers that he is a therianthrope who can shapeshift into a wolf. For the majority of the series, Jacob competes with Edward Cullen for Bella Swan's love. In The Twilight Saga film series, Jacob is played by Taylor Lautner.

== Concept and creation ==
According to Stephenie Meyer, Jacob was originally meant to be a device through which Bella could learn Edward's secret in Twilight, which was apparently because she could not see Edward actually admitting this to Bella. Meyer, her agent, and her editor all liked the character so much that they decided to give him a larger role in the following book, New Moon, with Meyer referring to the character as, "my favorite gift that New Moon gave to me."

Jacob was my first experience with a character taking over—a minor character developing such roundness and life that I couldn't keep him locked inside a tiny role. ... From the very beginning, even when Jacob only appeared in chapter six of Twilight, he was so alive. I liked him. More than I should for such a small part.

== Role in the books ==
=== Twilight ===
Jacob is given a small role in the first book of the series. He is introduced as the son of Billy Black, an old Swan family friend. When Bella uses him to get information on Edward Cullen and his family, Jacob tells her superstitious Quileute legends and introduces her to the idea that Edward is a vampire. Bella comes to like Jacob, and he develops a secret crush on her.

=== New Moon ===
In New Moon, Jacob's character is used as a device to help Bella emerge from her months-long depression, brought on by her distress over Edward's departure. The friendship between the two characters grows strong, but Jacob also develops romantic feelings for Bella that she does not reciprocate. It is revealed that, as a member of the Quileute tribe, Jacob is descended from an ancient line of "shapeshifters" that assume wolf form. In their backstory, the Quileutes and vampires are mortal enemies. When Jacob undergoes his first transformation into a wolf in front of Bella, it is in response to Paul, one of the wolf pack members who becomes enraged when he was slapped by Bella, causing him to phase and attempt to attack her. Jacob rushes outside to defend Bella, and he jumps high over her and phases in midair. Jacob rushes at Paul first and bites and pushes him. Jacob is shown in this scene to be very talented even when this was his first transformation at attacking and countering Paul as he is able to hit him before he has a chance to attack. A scene shows him tackling Paul causing him to crash into a boat rack. He and Paul later arrive at Emily Young's house and Paul apologizes to Bella. Soon, he becomes busy patrolling the forest with his pack, searching for vampires in the area. When Bella is caught by the vampire Laurent alone in a clearing, she is saved by Jacob and the wolf pack, who chase and kill Laurent. Sam first emerges from the woods, Laurent noticing more emerge runs away. Sam closes in on him but is struck back by Laurent just before he was about to tackle him. He later claims that Laurent was nothing but a simple kill. During the chase, Laurent is cornered by part of the pack while Jacob goes for the kill. Jacob and his friends are able to cover a range of 1.67 miles in just 1 minute meaning they are able to run at nearly or close to 100 mph at full run.

Jacob serves as a rescue for Bella and a foil to Edward on multiple occasions in the narrative. When Bella, who has taken increasingly dangerous risks to feel closer to Edward, impulsively jumps off a cliff and almost drowns, Jacob rescues her. After Edward mistakenly believes she has died and plans to kill himself, Bella and Alice Cullen, rush to Italy to prevent his suicide, leaving Jacob heartbroken. Jacob is disgusted by Edward's return and by Bella's willingness to take Edward back after he left her. Jacob reminds Edward of his tribe's treaty with the Cullen family, which states that the Cullens are not allowed to bite humans. Bella interrupts and points out to Jacob that she wants to become a vampire, and it's her own decision. This angers Jacob, and he attempts to start a fight with Edward. Edward decides to leave with Bella, but Jacob grabs him and says: "You don't speak for her." causing Edward to uppercut punch him into the air, causing him to transform. Edward and Jacob are stopped immediately by Bella as she says: "You can't harm each other without harming me." Jacob, now feeling full of guilt and knowing that he would not harm her due to his still having a tremendous crush on her and her being his best and closest friend, decides to accept her wish, but he is feeling hurt by her decision which causes him to run away.

=== Eclipse ===
In Eclipse, Jacob, enraged that Bella plans to become a vampire, attempts to distance himself by not returning her phone calls and refusing to see her. Later, during the scene when Jacob visits Bella and Edward to discuss the vampire Victoria's return, he tells Bella that he misses her and wishes that they could remain friends. With Edward's approval, Bella begins to visit Jacob on a regular basis. On one of these visits, Jacob tells Bella that he is in love with her and that he wants her to choose him over Edward. Bella is caught off guard by his confession and tells him she only thinks of him as a friend. He forcibly kisses her, and she reacts by punching him in the face. This breaks her hand, though it does not affect Jacob because he is a werewolf and doesn't get hurt easily. This act later enrages Edward, and the two get into a heated argument in front of Bella's house. They come extremely close to a physical fight, until Bella pushes Edward away and pleads for them to stop. Edward, still fuming with rage, tells Jacob that if Bella gives him the word, he will harm him. Bella's father comes outside at that moment, and demands to know what's going on. Jacob admits that he kissed Bella, and she broke her hand punching him. Jacob apologizes and leaves.

Later on, Jacob's shapeshifter wolf pack and the Cullen family join forces to defeat Victoria and the army of newborn vampires she has created. The wolf pack have agreed to meet at their house. They are in their wolf form as they don't trust the Cullen's enough to be in their human form as they possibly believe this to be a plot to destroy the pack. Carlisle greets them and tells how they should accurately and successfully attack a newborn. Sam telepathically asks what a newborn is and what the difference is between them and the newborn. He tells them that the newborns are a fresh breed of vampires that were humans forcibly turned with a combination of both human and vampire strength with most of their human element relying on intelligence. Carlisle tells them that they should never let a single one get their arms around them as they are strong enough to crush their bodies. He also says that they should never go for the "obvious" kill as they can get outnumbered easily and lose most of the pack. As the Cullen's demonstrate their tactics to the wolves on how they deal with newborns, Jacob also in his wolf form comes up to Bella. He nudges close to her as he still has a crush on her. She tells Jacob that if they join this attack many of them could get hurt or even killed. In response Jacob places his head in front of her and she pets him. Suddenly Edwards sees this and Jacob looks at him with a disgusted and annoyed look and walks off. The night before the battle, Edward and Jacob are alone with Bella on the top of a mountain. They are there, in a secluded spot, to protect her from Victoria and her blood-hungry army. It is night, and a blizzard beats at their tent. Bella is freezing to death, huddled in a blanket hold and shivering violently. Edward watches on with despair, as he can do nothing to help because his vampire skin is ice-cold. Jacob, being a werewolf, is never cold and has very a warm body. Because of his enhanced senses he can hear Bella's teeth chattering as he claims that he "can't sleep with all that teeth chattering going on." He moves forward to lay down with Bella, knowing his body heat would keep her warm. Edward shoves him away, outraged, and says he will not go near her. Jacob demands that Edward lets him go. Bella, hardly conscious, pleads for them not to fight. Jacob insists that Bella needs his warmth, and reluctantly Edward lets him crawl into the blankets with her. She cuddles into his warmth, still hardly conscious. Bella stops shaking and chattering. She falls asleep in his arms. While she is sleeping, Edward and Jacob begin to talk quietly. As the night wears on, their private conversation softens and the two become closer.

Right before the battle the next morning, Jacob overhears Edward and Bella discussing their engagement. He did not know about this, because Bella was trying to keep it a secret until the battle was over, for she knew he'd be reckless with his anger. Jacob is outraged, and refuses to believe that Bella truly loves Edward more than him. He threatens suicide by hoping he'd be killed in the battle. He is about to run off to join the soon-to-be-battle. Bella, in an attempt to stop him from getting killed, demands to be kissed by him. Jacob doesn't hesitate, and he kisses her passionately. Then, he leaves for the battle and Bella feels relieved to know that he no longer wants to be killed while fighting. After he is gone, she comes to the realization that she does love Jacob.

In the battle, Jacob fights ferociously and savagely. He is in his wolf form as is the rest of the pack. He kills many vampires and together, with the Cullens, they defeat Victoria's newborn army. The battle is over, but one newborn vampire who had remained hidden the whole time, emerges from hiding. Leah, one of the wolves, immediately attacks. The enemy vampire wraps his arms around her neck and tries to strangle her, but Jacob lunges forward and knocks him off. They engage in a brief but vicious fight. Jacob falls and the vampire crushes his body with violent force. At once the vampire is pulled off by the other wolves and killed. Jacob is now back in human form. He is writhing on the ground naked and in extreme agony. Carlisle, the doctor vampire, announces that the bones in the right half of his body are crushed. The other wolves, now back in their human form too, stare in horror as Carlisle continues to inspect him. He tells the others that Jacob is healing from but at an extremely low rate and says that he needs to re-align Jacob's bones in order to speed up his healing. Leah is full of guilt and shame, and insists that she "had him" [the vampire]. Sam tells her to be quiet. Sam suggested that they bring Jacob back to Billy's house so he start helping Jacob. Then, they haul Jacob off the ground and carry him off.

At Jacob's house, Bella overhears Jacob screaming in pain as Carlisle re-aligns him. One of the pack tells Bella that Carlisle is doing this to speed up Jacobs healing. He is in bed with a high fever. Bella is worried and apologizes to him, wishing he'll get better soon. She also admits that it was a mistake to kiss him, and tries to tell him that even if she does love him, he has to accept that it is Edward who truly lies in her heart. Then she leaves, and Jacob is angered and deeply hurt.

The epilogue is written from Jacob's point of view; angry and heartbroken at Bella's decision to become a vampire. He runs away in his wolf form to escape his pain.

=== Breaking Dawn ===
Jacob returns after an absence of several weeks to attend Bella and Edward's wedding in Breaking Dawn. Though described as being still visibly pained by her decision, he tells Bella that he wants her to be happy. Bella tells him that she and Edward plan to have a normal honeymoon before she becomes a vampire. Jacob becomes enraged, because he knows that Edward's vampire strength could kill her. Sam and the rest of the pack stop him before he phases into wolf form and gets into a fight with Edward.

When Bella and Edward return from their honeymoon, Jacob becomes the narrator of the story for several chapters, during which he learns that she is pregnant with Edward's half-human, half-vampire baby and is extremely ill. When Jacob informs the pack of Bella's pregnancy, their leader Sam Uley plans an attack on the Cullens in order to kill Bella and her unborn child because of the threat he believes the child presents. Jacob, who feels that the Cullens are innocent, fights back against Sam and leaves the pack. Fulfilling his birthright as Alpha wolf, he is joined in a new pack by Seth and Leah Clearwater, who aid Jacob in protecting the Cullens. After the birth of Renesmee Carlie Cullen, Edward and Bella's daughter, Jacob "imprints" - an involuntary response in which a wolf finds his soulmate - on her. Afterward, Jacob is completely over Bella, and they remain close friends. The relationship between Jacob and the Cullens is also dispelled, and he and Edward come to view each other as friends after Jacob emotionally bonds with Renesmee.

== Characterization ==
=== Physical appearance ===
In Twilight Jacob is described as having russet-colored skin, dark deep set eyes, and long black hair. When Bella Swan first sees Jacob, she describes him as having a "pretty face" and a "childish" round chin despite his tall stature. While he is initially described as having a lanky build, Jacob becomes toned and muscular after discovering his shape-shifting powers in New Moon. He also crops his long black hair short. He grows his hair to chin length in Eclipse in an attempt to appeal to Bella, however his hair is once again cut short in Breaking Dawn. When he shape shifts, Jacob is described as a large reddish brown wolf with "dark, nearly black" eyes.

=== Personality and abilities ===
Bella describes Jacob as a "happy person" who extends his happiness to the people around him. As Jacob's character emerges in New Moon, he is shown to be cheery, passionate, and adventurous, but hot-headed. Jacob is also able to shape-shift at will into a giant wolf, and sometimes when angered he will involuntarily phase. His body temperature is warmer than a human's body should be, reaching about 108.9 °F (42.7 °C), which allows him to withstand very cold weather. In human form, his body heals within seconds depending on the wound. He possesses superhuman strength and speed, has a high durability rate, sharp senses, and free running abilities. In wolf form he can communicate with his pack telepathically,. He has enhanced superhuman strength, speed, and a substantial size increase. While in wolf form, his teeth can cut through the "granite-hard" body of a vampire with ease. Members of the Quileute wolf-pack do age if they do not phase for a long time; Jacob's body has physically grown to the equivalent of a 25-year-old in Breaking Dawn but stops aging after that. Jacob is the second largest wolf, but has shown to be the strongest of the pack. Once they begin phasing, a Quileute shape-shifter may "imprint"—a method of finding one's soulmate—on someone, and will act as whatever that person wants or needs, whether it be an older brother, friend, protector, or lover. Jacob imprints on Edward and Bella's newborn daughter Renesmee in Breaking Dawn.

While treating Jacob in Eclipse, Carlisle takes a blood sample and runs some tests on it. Carlisle discovers that Jacob has 24 pairs of chromosomes, one more than a human. A distinction is made in Breaking Dawn between the "Old-World" Children of the Moon ("true werewolves") and the shape-shifting Quileute tribe. The former are held to be a more ferocious and territorial type, with a transformative venomous bite, who involuntarily phase as do traditional werewolves on the full moon. The wolves are implied to possess the supernatural ability to shapeshift into other giant animals or "spirits of nature". Also known in the quileute tribe legends as "spirit warriors ".

== Film portrayal ==
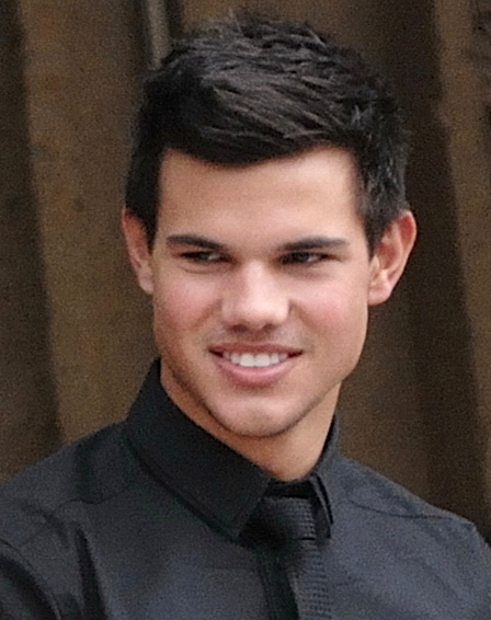
Taylor Lautner

Taylor Lautner played the part of Jacob Black in the film adaptation of Twilight. Due to major physical changes in the character of Jacob between Twilight and New Moon, director Chris Weitz considered replacing Lautner in the sequel with an actor who could more accurately portray "the new, larger Jacob Black." In an attempt to keep the role, Lautner stated, "I have been working out. I've been working out since the day we finished filming Twilight. I just weighed myself today; I've put on 19 pounds ... [and] I'm guaranteeing Weitz 11 more [pounds] by filming." Lautner continued to play the role of Jacob in New Moon and all the subsequent films. He also performed his own stunts.

== Team Jacob ==
Many fans of the Twilight franchise, particularly teenagers, have debated whether Edward or Jacob is the better match for Bella. Both sides of the debate have coalesced around informal "teams" of followers, whether "Team Jacob" or "Team Edward". In a poll done by Novel Novice Twilight and appearing on NNT News in 2008, Team Jacob got 2,641 votes and Team Edward got 5,130 votes. A poll done by Top 7 with over 43,000 votes had Jacob trailing Edward by around 3,000 votes.

Lautner portrayed a diehard Edward supporter in a December 12, 2009 sketch lampooning Twilight fans on Saturday Night Live.
