= List of Twilight characters =

The Cullens as portrayed in New Moon: (from left) Nikki Reed (Rosalie), Elizabeth Reaser (Esme), Peter Facinelli (Carlisle), Robert Pattinson (Edward), Kellan Lutz (Emmett), Ashley Greene (Alice), and Jackson Rathbone (Jasper).

The following is a list of characters in the Twilight novel series by Stephenie Meyer, comprising the books Twilight, New Moon, Eclipse and Breaking Dawn, as well as The Twilight Saga film series adaptations.

== Major characters ==
=== Bella Swan ===
Isabella Marie "Bella" Swan (later Bella Cullen) is the fictional protagonist of the Twilight series, written by Stephenie Meyer. The Twilight series is primarily narrated from Bella's point of view.

In Twilight, Bella moves to her father's home in Forks, Washington, meets the mysterious Cullen family, and falls in love with Edward Cullen. However, she soon discovers that the family is a coven of vampires. Bella expresses a desire to become a vampire herself, against Edward's wishes. In the second novel, New Moon, Edward and the other Cullens leave Forks in an effort to keep Bella safe from the vampire world. Jacob Black, a member of the Quileute tribe who is also a shape shifter taking a wolf form, comforts the distraught and severely depressed Bella. She comes to care for Jacob, though less than she loves Edward. In Eclipse, Bella becomes engaged to Edward, and they marry in Breaking Dawn. Edward then transforms Bella into a vampire after she nearly dies giving birth to their daughter, Renesmee. Bella has the ability to shield her mind (from mind reading, attacks, etc.), which she had as a human. Once she is transformed into a vampire, her ability is enhanced to the point she can also expand her shield to protect others from mind control.

Kristen Stewart plays Bella in the Twilight film series.

=== Edward Cullen ===
Edward Cullen (born Edward Anthony Masen) is Bella's primary love interest. As stated in the first and second novels, he was born on June 20, 1901, in Chicago, Illinois, and was frozen in his 17-year-old body while dying of Spanish influenza, when he was changed into a vampire by Dr. Carlisle Cullen. As shown in Twilight, Carlisle only did so because Edward's dying mother, Elizabeth, begged him to save Edward. A member of the Olympic Coven, Edward only drinks animal blood and has the special ability to read minds. He falls in love with Bella soon after she arrives in Forks. Edward knows that he could kill Bella easily, a fact that torments him so much that, in the book New Moon, he decided to leave Forks with his family so they wouldn't be able to hurt her. He returned because he realized he cannot live without her. Edward marries Bella in Breaking Dawn and they have a daughter, Renesmee.

Robert Pattinson plays Edward in the Twilight film series.

=== Jacob Black ===
Jacob Black is Bella's best friend. He is a Quileute Native American and a werewolf. In Twilight, Jacob plays the minor role of a forgotten childhood friend of Bella's, and he develops a crush on her. In an attempt to learn more about Cullens, Bella flirts with Jacob, and he tells her tribe legends about "the cold ones", or vampires. After Edward leaves Bella in New Moon, she spends much of her time with Jacob. Though she only considers him a friend, Jacob falls in love with Bella. Although he spends most of his time in Eclipse trying to win Bella, in Breaking Dawn he imprints— an involuntary process in which a werewolf finds their soul mate— on Bella and Edward's daughter, Renesmee.

Taylor Lautner plays Jacob in the Twilight film series.

=== Carlisle Cullen ===
Carlisle Cullen (also known as Stregoni Benefici) is Esme Cullen's husband and the adoptive father of Edward, Emmett, Alice, Rosalie, and Jasper. His first appearance was in Twilight. His physical age is 23, and he has blond hair. His natural compassion during his life as a human translated into his decision never to drink human blood or kill a human, which he has adhered to. Through the centuries, he has become a skilled doctor and surgeon, and he is completely indifferent to the scent of human blood.

Cullen was born at some point during the 1640s in London to an Anglican priest. His father and other pastors hunted witches, werewolves, and vampires. Following his father, he discovered a coven of vampires. After an ancient vampire attacked him, he fled and silently endured the transformation. He was horrified by what he had become, and he attempted suicide. He realized that he could sate his thirst on the blood of animals, and he dedicated himself to becoming a doctor and helping humans.

For a few decades, Carlisle lived with the Volturi in Italy, but he left because of their incompatible feeding styles. He traveled to the New World. Treating patients suffering with Spanish Influenza, he met an ill woman who begged him to save her dying son, Edward. He transformed Edward into a vampire, and he became Edward's father figure and companion. In 1921, Carlisle moved to Ashland, Wisconsin, and he met Esme after she attempted suicide. He transformed Esme into a vampire, fell in love with her, and married her. In Rochester, New York, he found Rosalie Hale after her drunken fiancé and his friends nearly killed her. While hunting, Rosalie found Emmett (who had been mauled by a bear) and she carried him to Carlisle. Rosalie feared that she would be unable to resist her bloodlust, so she carried Emmett to Carlisle to be transformed.

Carlisle and his family moved to Hoquiam, Washington and arranged a treaty with the Quileute Native American tribe. The Quileutes would not attack the Cullen family if they agreed not to attack any humans or trespass on Quileute land. The Cullens lived in relative peace until they needed to move on, so as not to lead to rumors about their stagnant ages. Alice and Jasper independently found Carlisle and joined his family. Throughout the Twilight saga, Carlisle works as a doctor, acts as the coven leader, and offers medical advice when Bella is pregnant in Breaking Dawn.

In its 2009 Fictional Top 15 wealthiest fictional characters, Forbes magazine placed Carlisle in 1st place. Using 370 years of compound interest, he amassed a fortune of $34.5 billion.

Peter Facinelli plays Carlisle in the Twilight film series.

=== Esme Cullen ===
Esme Cullen (born Esme Platt and later Esme Evenson) is Carlisle Cullen's wife and the adoptive mother of Edward, Emmett and Alice Cullen, as well as Rosalie and Jasper Hale. She enjoys restoring old houses and her physical age is 26. She has no special power, but has a strong ability to love passionately. Esme is described as having caramel-colored hair; she also has a heart-shaped face with dimples, and her figure is slender, but rounded and soft. Esme was born in 1895 in Columbus, Ohio, where she was treated at the age of 16 by Carlisle after breaking her leg when climbing a tree. She married Charles Evenson, but he abused her. After finding out she was pregnant, she ran away and gave birth to a son, who subsequently died a few days later. Grief-stricken by his death, Esme attempted to kill herself by jumping off a cliff. Presumed dead, she was brought to a morgue. Carlisle, who remembered treating her years before, was able to hear her faint heartbeat and transformed her into a vampire. Esme fell in love with and married Carlisle soon after. She loves her adoptive children, including Bella, as if they were her own and has the most affection for Edward, but she still grieves that she is unable to bear children.

Esme is present throughout the entire Twilight series, revealing her past to Bella during the Cullens' baseball game in Twilight. Esme treats Bella as her own daughter, comforting her after several traumatic events. In the film adaptation of Eclipse, Esme participated in a battle against the newborn vampires but in the book series, it is stated by Sam in Breaking Dawn that she is not a fighter. In Breaking Dawn, it is revealed that Esme owns a South American island named "Isle Esme" that Carlisle purchased for her, and where Edward and Bella spend their honeymoon.

Elizabeth Reaser plays Esme in the Twilight film series.

=== Alice Cullen ===
Alice Cullen (born Mary Alice Brandon) is the adopted daughter of Carlisle and Esme Cullen, adoptive sister of Edward and Emmett Cullen and Rosalie Hale, and the partner of Jasper Hale. Alice is petite and pixie-like, with a graceful gait and hair that is short, spiky, and black. Her special ability is to see the future, an enhanced version of her ability to have premonitions as a human. Her ability is limited; she is only able to see the outcome of a decision once it is made. Due to this, decisions made in the spur of the moment can not be foreseen. Alice can see futures involving humans and vampires, but is unable to see those involving half-breeds, such as Renesmee and the werewolves. Alice is bubbly and optimistic, and she loves and cares for Bella like a sister. She is also close to her brother Edward, and enjoys shopping, make-overs, and throwing parties. Alice's early history is vague, as she remembers nothing about her human life and woke up alone as a vampire. It is eventually revealed that she was born around 1901 in Biloxi, Mississippi, and was committed to an asylum because she had premonitions. Alice was transformed by an old vampire who worked at the asylum to protect her from James, a tracker vampire who was hunting her. After some research, Alice found her grave and discovered that the date on her tombstone matches the date of her admission to the asylum. Through her research she additionally discovered that she had a younger sister named Cynthia, and that Cynthia's daughter, Alice's niece, is still alive in Biloxi.

Alice enjoys playing "Newcomb's paradox-chess" against her telepathic brother Edward. Throughout Twilight, Alice uses her ability to see the future and help Bella when she is in danger. The two soon become friends, loving each other like sisters. In New Moon, Alice foresees Bella jumping off a cliff and assumes she is trying to commit suicide, though Bella actually was cliff diving. After discovering the truth, Alice accompanies Bella to Italy to prevent Edward from killing himself. They are successful, but are taken to see the Volturi, who police the vampire world. Through Alice's premonitions, Aro is able to see that Bella will eventually become a vampire and invites her, Alice, and Edward to stay with them; it is later mentioned that Aro especially covets Alice's gift. In Eclipse, Alice, who proves to be an adept fighter, joins the fight to destroy a group of rampaging newborn vampires, created by Victoria in an effort to take revenge on Edward. Alice acts as Bella's maid of honor at her wedding in Breaking Dawn and helps care for Renesmee until leaving to search out a crossbreed after the Volturi plan to destroy Renesmee, believing her to be an immortal child. Alice is successful and the Volturi, convinced there is no threat, leave.

Ashley Greene plays Alice in the Twilight film series.

Paloma Kwiatkowski plays the young Mary Alice Brandon in the short film The Mary Alice Brandon File.

=== Emmett Cullen ===
Emmett Cullen (born Emmett Dale McCarty) is Rosalie Hale's husband, Carlisle and Esme Cullen's adopted son, and Edward, Alice, and Jasper's adopted brother. He is tall and muscular. He has dark curly hair and dimpled cheeks. Despite his intimidating appearance, he is light-hearted and carefree. He enjoys fights and pranks. He is Edward's favorite brother, and he is in a loving, committed relationship with Rosalie.

In 1935, Emmett was a 20-year-old in Gatlinburg, Tennessee. A bear attacked him, and he nearly died from his injuries. Rosalie was hunting in the area, and she was attracted to Emmett's dark curls, dimples, and innocent aura. She carried him over a hundred miles through Appalachia, and she asked Carlisle to transform Emmett into a vampire. Emmett joined Carlisle's coven, but he struggled to resist his desire for human blood and subsist only on animal blood.

Emmett treats Bella as a younger sister. He teases her for her clumsiness and constant blushing, and votes in favor of her becoming a vampire and joining their family in New Moon. In Breaking Dawn Emmett helps train Bella to fight in the oncoming battle with the Volturi.

Kellan Lutz plays Emmett in the Twilight film series.

=== Rosalie Hale ===
Rosalie Hale is the adopted daughter of Carlisle and Esme Cullen, adoptive sister of Jasper Hale as well as Edward and Alice Cullen, and the wife of Emmett Cullen. She and Jasper are the only ones who don't take the surname of Cullen as they pass off as being biological siblings. Her physical age is 18, and she was born in 1915 in Rochester, New York. Rosalie is described as exceptionally beautiful, even for a vampire; she is tall, statuesque, and has long, wavy blonde hair. While she was human, she was said to be a woman with elegance, class, and eyes the color of violets. In Eclipse, she describes her human self as vain, self-centered, and shallow, pleased with her physical beauty and forever desiring attention. A wealthy young man named Royce King II took an interest in her and soon the two became engaged, with Rosalie eager to have a fancy wedding, live in a big, expensive house, and have children of her own. While visiting her friend Vera, she one day noticed that she did not share the same loving relationship with Royce as her friend Vera did with her husband. Dismissing it, Rosalie later walked home and met an intoxicated Royce and his friends, leading to her being beaten, gang-raped, and left to die in the streets. She is found by Carlisle, who had smelled the blood, and he pitied her and changed her into a vampire with the secret hope that she would become Edward's mate, though the two of them are never more than brother and sister. After her transformation, she tortured and killed those who had attacked her, including Royce, but did not drink their blood, a fact that she is proud of. She found Emmett two years after becoming a vampire, and begged Carlisle to change him since she was afraid of doing it herself. They have been together ever since. Apart from Carlisle and Edward, she has the most self-control and appreciation for human life, and has never tasted human blood. Rosalie is bitter that her life as a vampire prevents her from having children and experiencing the normal changes of life, and her desire to be human is so strong that she would give up her immortality and beauty for it.

When Rosalie first appears in Twilight she is hostile toward Bella and jealous of her humanity; she is also irritated that Edward could be attracted to Bella, a mere human, when he had never shown the slightest interest in Rosalie, who has always been desired by men. In New Moon, she mistakenly reports to Edward that Bella is dead after supposedly committing suicide. She is guilty and apologetic upon Bella and Edward's return from Italy, and is the only one next to Edward who opposes Bella becoming a vampire. In Eclipse, Rosalie reveals her past to Bella with the hope that Bella will choose to stay human and she later joins in the fight against Victoria's army of newborn vampires. In Breaking Dawn, Bella contacts Rosalie after finding out she is pregnant, knowing that Rosalie has always wanted children. She stays by Bella's side throughout the pregnancy, defending Bella's choice to keep the baby; this ultimately brings the two of them closer together, and by the end of the novel they have become friends. Rosalie later helps care for the child, Renesmee, while Bella is undergoing transformation into a vampire.

Nikki Reed plays Rosalie in the Twilight film series.

=== Jasper Hale ===
Jasper Hale (born Jasper Whitlock) is the adopted son of Carlisle and Esme Cullen, adoptive brother of Rosalie, Edward, and Emmett, and husband of Alice Cullen. He and Rosalie are not related, but they can pass for biological siblings and share the surname "Hale." He has honey-blond hair, and he is lean. His face and body are covered with crescent-shaped scars, after his years of fighting and training newborn vampires.

He was born about 1844 in what is now the state of Texas. In 1861, he joined the Confederate States Army to serve in the American Civil War. He was extremely charismatic and ascended through the ranks. In 1863, Maria transformed the 19-year-old Jasper to help her claim territory in Monterrey. As a vampire, he gained the ability to sense and manipulate the emotions of those around him. In Maria's army, he trained young vampires and killed them when they were no longer useful. After a century, he wearied of the lifestyle and joined his friend Peter and his mate Charlotte.

Despite feeling his prey's fear and horror as they died, Jasper couldn't stop himself from feeding on humans. In the Cullen family, he is least able to control his bloodlust and struggles to maintain his "vegetarian" lifestyle. He isn't as emotionally attached to the other members of the Cullen family, but he stays because he is devoted to Alice.

Alice foresaw that she and Jasper would fall in love, and she found him out in a diner in Philadelphia. Together, they joined the Cullen family.

In Twilight, Jasper struggles to prevent himself from attacking Bella. He accompanies Alice and Bella when they are hiding from James, using his ability to calm Bella when she is stressed or afraid. In New Moon, he loses control and tries to attack Bella after smelling her blood when she gets a papercut, prompting Edward to leave Forks in order to protect her. When the Cullens return, Jasper votes for Bella to become a vampire, stating that it would be a nice change from him wanting to attack her. In Eclipse, Jasper teaches the werewolves and vampires fighting techniques to defend themselves against newborn vampires. In Breaking Dawn, he leaves with Alice to find a vampire-human hybrid, and returns with her to defend Renesmee and the rest of the family against the Volturi.

Jackson Rathbone plays Jasper in the Twilight film series.

=== Renesmee Cullen ===
Renesmee Carlie "Nessie" Cullen (/rəˈnɛzmeɪ/ rə-NEZ-may) is the dhampir daughter of Edward Cullen and Bella Swan, born on September 11, two days before Bella's nineteenth birthday in Breaking Dawn. Her name is derived from the amalgamation of the names of Bella's mother, Renée, and Edward's adoptive mother, Esme. Her middle name, Carlie, is a portmanteau of the names Carlisle, Edward's adoptive father, and Charlie, Bella's father. She has the same facial features and hair color as Edward, but has curly hair inherited from her grandfather, Charlie Swan, and brown eyes like Bella. Her heart pumps blood, giving her a blush, and her pale skin slightly glows in sunlight. Her skin is warm and soft to the touch, but it is as strong as a vampire's. Only minutes after she is born, she is imprinted upon by Jacob Black, who becomes her soul mate and acts as an older brother figure to her. Renesmee can survive on either blood or human food, though she prefers blood, and she does not produce venom. Her special abilities are transmitting thoughts to others by touching their skin and penetrating mental shields, the opposite abilities of each of her parents. She rapidly grows both mentally and physically, is able to speak only seven days after her birth, and by the end of the novel can read, run, hunt, and perform other tasks at advanced levels for her young age. Her intelligence stuns everyone, and she is able to understand what is happening around her when the Volturi arrive. Jacob nicknames her "Nessie" because he considers her full name to be a mouthful, though Bella strongly dislikes her child being nicknamed "after the Loch Ness Monster". By the book's end, however, all of the characters have adopted this shortened version. Nessie will reach physical maturity after about seven years, when her appearance will be around 17, and then stop aging.

Weeks after Renesmee is born, Irina, a vampire from the Denali coven, sees Renesmee and incorrectly believes she is an "immortal child", a young human child who has been changed into a vampire. She informs the Volturi, as immortal children are not permitted to exist due to their unpredictable nature. Intent on killing Renesmee and the other Cullens, the Volturi travel to Forks. The Cullens gather witnesses from around the world to testify that they have seen her mature and grow, and so she is therefore not an immortal child. Alice brings another half-breed, 150-year-old Nahuel, who explains that half-breeds pose no danger to the vampires. Convinced that Renesmee is not a threat, the Volturi leave, and Renesmee and her family are left in peace.

Mackenzie Foy plays Renesmee in the film adaptation of Breaking Dawn.

Stephenie Meyer, when asked about whether or not Jacob could father children with Renesmee, responded: "That is a question I'm reserving the right not to answer, because there is a chance I'll go back to their story."

== Vampires ==
In Twilight, vampires deviate from traditional myth in many ways, a fact often alluded to in the series, usually for humor. Meyer has said she did not research vampire mythology before writing the series. For example, they are unharmed by garlic, holy items, or wooden stakes; they have reflections and shadows, and are able to be out during daylight, but the crystalline properties of their cells will cause them to have a sparkling effect. Vampires are also capable of eating human food, though their bodies are unable to digest it and they must cough it up later. They do not have to breathe, but typically find it uncomfortable to be without a sense of smell.

All vampires possess refined and perfected physical features (including their voice and scent), allowing them to lure in prey. Their skin is flawless, has the texture and feel of marble due to being stronger than granite, and sparkles in direct sunlight because of the crystalline properties of their cells. Newborn vampires have bright red eyes; for vampires who choose to drink human blood, the most revitalizing kind of blood for a vampire, eye color fades to a deep crimson over the course of a year. If they feed on animal blood, like the Cullens, their eyes fade to a deep gold color. Regardless of meal preference, all vampires' eyes grow darker with thirst, eventually fading to black; vampires tire only from lack of blood. All vampires possess superhuman physical and mental attributes. Their superhuman strength gives them the ability to subdue their prey, uproot trees, throw cars, and crush metal. Newborn vampires are known to be exceptionally strong during their first year because of the excessive amount of human blood still in their systems. Vampires have very keen senses and are able to see and hear clearly for miles in total darkness and move with such speed that they become a blur to human eyes. They are effectively immortal and nearly impossible to destroy, only permanently killed when dismembered and then burned, as their body parts continue to move even after being detached. Vampires also do not have to sleep; they do not feel physical fatigue, and mental fatigue passes very quickly. After transformation, a vampire's certain ability becomes enhanced, sometimes resulting in a specialized, supernatural skill. While not definite, the theory behind these special abilities is that the power is reminiscent of the individual's original personality. Some vampires have no special abilities, and instead have a prominent personality or physical trait from their human life magnified.

=== The Volturi ===
The Volturi, from left to right: Alec, Marcus, Aro, Caius, and Jane, from The Twilight Saga: New Moon.

The vampire coven known as the Volturi live in Volterra, Tuscany (Italy), which they have secretly controlled since the time of the Etruscans. They are regarded as "royalty" by other vampires because they have lived for well over 3000 years and ensure that vampires remain a secret from humans. They often send emissaries or enforcers from Volterra to prevent overzealous covens and renegade vampires from exposing their kind. They are guarded by several powerful vampires who have been recruited for their powers and skills. Carlisle once stayed with the coven as a guest, but left due to his desire to avoid harming humans and established his own coven in the United States. At the end of New Moon, the Volturi discover that Bella, a human, has learned that vampires exist and demand that she become a vampire or else be killed. In Eclipse, they arrive in Forks under the pretense of eliminating Victoria and her newborn army for violating Volturi law; their true intentions, however, were to allow Victoria's army to destroy the Cullen clan, whom Aro envies for its large size and for its members' supernatural talents. In Breaking Dawn, the vampire Irina goes to the Volturi and informs them that the Cullens have created what she believes to be an immortal child. The Volturi travel to Forks to destroy Renesmee and the Cullens, but leave when Aro not only sees the vision of his covens fate but meets another human with vampire traits of 150 years of age. It is noted at the end of the novel that the Volturi may one day attempt to destroy the Cullen family again.

The Volturi leaders include Aro, an ambitious vampire who can read every thought a person has ever had once he has made physical contact and is known to be steadfast in his decision, Marcus, who senses the strength and nature of relationships and willingly embraces death, and Caius, an arrogant vampire who is strict about the laws in place and has no known ability. Aro's wife Sulpicia, Caius' wife Athenodora, and Marcus' late wife Didyme, who had the power to make others happy, also act as leaders. The Volturi guard consists of 32 members, including Jane, who creates sensations of pain; her twin brother Alec, who is able to block others' senses; Demetri, who can track anyone once he has the tenor of their mind; Felix, who possesses exceptional physical strength and speed; Chelsea, who can change emotional bonds and causes members of the Volturi to be loyal to the coven; Chelsea's mate, Afton, who can cast mental invisibility to cover himself; Corin, who is able to invest addictive contentment and is primarily charged to please the leaders' wives; Heidi, who is extremely beautiful and hard to resist and serves as the "fisher" for outside humans to come to Volterra for the Volturi to feast, since the Volturi must maintain their secrecy in Volterra by not feeding on the local humans; Renata, who can make anyone feel distracted and wandering when they are near her (classified as a "shield"); and Santiago, who possesses heightened strength similar to Felix. The majority of the Volturi guard remain nameless throughout the series. There is also a human secretary named Gianna, who appears in New Moon and is killed by the Volturi by the events of Breaking Dawn, despite her hope that they would turn her into a vampire. Aro, coveting their talents, invites Carlisle, Edward, Alice, Kate, Benjamin, Zafrina, and Bella to join the Volturi, but all of them refuse.

In The Twilight Saga: New Moon, the cast of the Volturi includes Michael Sheen as Aro; Jamie Campbell Bower as Caius; Christopher Heyerdahl as Marcus; Dakota Fanning as Jane; Cameron Bright as Alec; Charlie Bewley as Demetri; Daniel Cudmore as Felix; and Noot Seear as Heidi;. Fanning, Bright, Bewley, and Cudmore all reprised their roles in The Twilight Saga: Eclipse. They all returned, joined by Lateef Crowder dos Santos as Santiago, for The Twilight Saga: Breaking Dawn.

=== Nomads ===
==== James ====
All three of the nomads shown together in Twilight. From left to right: Laurent, James, and Victoria.

James is the main antagonist of the first novel. He is a merciless, sadistic "tracker" vampire who hunts human beings and other vampires for sport. Fellow coven member Laurent says that James is unusually gifted at what he does and always gets what he wants, though it is later revealed that then-human Alice Cullen escaped him years ago by being turned into a vampire before James could attack her. Unlike the Cullen family, he drinks human blood. Towards the end of Twilight, James is destroyed by the Cullen siblings Emmett, Jasper, and Alice after he lures Bella to an empty ballet studio and nearly kills her. The shimmery scar left by his venomous bite still remains on Bella's hand as a symbol of his unsuccessful attempt on her life. James is described as having light brown hair and being quite average-looking.

James is portrayed by Cam Gigandet in the Twilight film. In the film, he is given the surname "Witherdale".

==== Victoria ====
A red-haired, catlike vampire, Victoria is originally a member of James' coven. She plays a small role in the first book assisting James, her lover and coven leader, in hunting Bella Swan. After James is killed, she decides to exact revenge on Edward Cullen by plotting to kill the woman he loves, Bella. Bella is sufficiently protected from her wrath by the Quileute shape-shifting wolves. Months later in Eclipse, Victoria creates an army of bloodthirsty newborn vampires in Seattle to rise up against the combined forces of the werewolves and Cullen family. During this battle, both she and her new fighting partner, Riley, are destroyed by Edward and the young wolf Seth Clearwater. Her supernatural talent is self-preservation; she can sense if others are planning to harm or kill her, and her voice is said to sound high and girlish.

Victoria is portrayed by Rachelle Lefevre in the films Twilight and The Twilight Saga: New Moon. Bryce Dallas Howard replaces Lefevre in the role for the third film, The Twilight Saga: Eclipse.

==== Laurent ====
A dark-haired, olive-toned vampire, Laurent is the leader of a trio of vampires wreaking havoc in the Olympic Peninsula in Twilight. When James and Victoria choose to track and murder Bella, despite her being under the Cullens protection, Laurent leaves them, warns the Cullens about James, and travels to Denali, Alaska, hoping to find solace among a coven of "vegetarian" vampires. He never adopts their strict diet of drinking animal blood, and "cheats" by occasionally feeding on humans. During this stay he takes a special liking to a vampire named Irina, though the infatuation is not strong enough to keep him there, as he later returns to Forks in New Moon as a favor to Victoria. During this visit, he stumbles across Bella and tries to kill her, before being ambushed by the Quileute wolves and subsequently destroyed. Laurent is described as power-hungry in The Official Illustrated Guide, but decides to help Carlisle save Bella from James.

Laurent is portrayed by Edi Gathegi in Twilight, The Twilight Saga: New Moon and in a flashback seen In The Twilight Saga: Breaking Dawn – Part 1. In the films, he is given the surname "Da Revin".

=== Newborn army ===
==== Riley Biers ====
Riley Biers as portrayed in The Twilight Saga: Eclipse

As a vampire, Riley Biers is tall and muscular with bright red eyes and blond hair. Victoria bites and changes Riley when he is approximately Bella's age in Eclipse. Once Riley ages and gains some control, he helps to lead Victoria's army of newborn vampires. He performs his work faithfully because of his love for Victoria, which she pretends to return. In a battle between the army of newborns and the Cullens at the end of Eclipse, Edward voices Riley's concern that Victoria has been lying to him. Edward tries to convince Riley to stop fighting by explaining Victoria's true motives, but in the end Victoria bolsters Riley's faith in her and he is destroyed by Edward and Seth Clearwater.

In the film The Twilight Saga: Eclipse, Riley is described as a "good-looking college student" and is portrayed by Australian actor Xavier Samuel.

==== Bree Tanner ====
Bree Tanner was a young vampire created by Victoria as a part of the newborn army that attacks the Cullens in Eclipse. While she was human, Riley found her and brought her to Victoria, who bit and changed her. Her age is said to be 15 or 16, and she is described as petite with chin-length black hair. Because of her youth and her willingness to surrender, the Cullens spare her life during the newborn attack, and Carlisle even offers to make her part of the family. When the Volturi arrive, however, Jane orders her destroyed by Felix despite her innocence.

Stephenie Meyer's novella The Short Second Life of Bree Tanner, which is written from Bree's perspective, tells of Bree's life as a newborn vampire and her interactions with Riley, the Cullens, and other members of the newborn army.

In the film The Twilight Saga: Eclipse, she is portrayed by Canadian actress Jodelle Ferland.

=== Mexican coven ===
Maria is the only permanent member of the Mexican coven centered in Monterrey, Mexico. She was formerly a member of the Monterrey coven, which was eventually wiped out and left Maria as the only survivor. Together with Lucy and Nettie, the only surviving members of the Northern Texas and Arkansas covens, respectively, the coven became known, as with other covens in Mexico, for their tact in using newborns as soldiers, whom they dispose of after they cease to be newborns. Maria also bit and recruited Jasper Hale as her second-in-command for his ability to influence other people's emotions, and also Peter on Jasper's request. After discovering that Lucy and Nettie were plotting to overthrow her, Maria killed them with Jasper's help. However, Maria has to lead the coven alone when Peter fell in love with a newborn, Charlotte, and ran away with her to become nomads, while Jasper eventually followed them due to his increasing disapproval over the coven's way of life.

In the film The Twilight Saga: Eclipse, Maria is portrayed by Catalina Sandino Moreno, Lucy by Kirsten Zien, and Nettie by Leah Gibson.

=== Amazonian coven ===
Zafrina, Senna, and Kachiri are female vampires who comprise the Amazonian coven in Breaking Dawn. They are described as tall and intimidating, with dark skin, long hair, and clothes made of animal fur. Most vampires have never heard of them, not even the Volturi, as they prefer to have a reclusive life in the Pantanal against humans and vampires alike, only occasionally going out to feed on humans. The Cullens only discovered them when they happened to cross paths with them while they were hunting during their trip to South America. Zafrina's special ability is to create illusions; her illusions do not affect Bella or anyone who is under her protective shield, and she assists Bella in improving her shield. Zafrina develops a friendship with Renesmee, who is said to like Zafrina and her "pretty pictures", and at the end of the novel she has Bella promise to bring Renesmee to visit her in the future.

In the film The Twilight Saga: Breaking Dawn - part 2, Judi Shekoni portrays Zafrina and Tracey Heggins portrays Senna, as Kachiri never appears.

=== American nomads ===
Peter, his mate Charlotte, Mary, and Randall are American nomads. Peter is Jasper's good friend, and helped Jasper escape his previous life as a general of newborn vampires. Though he feeds on human blood, he does not agree with the execution of newborns after they have outlived their usefulness. In the past, Jasper lived with Peter and Charlotte, but chose to leave because of his ability to sense his human prey's emotions. All four of these nomads join the Cullens as witnesses in Breaking Dawn.

In The Twilight Saga: Breaking Dawn - Part II, Peter is portrayed by Erik Odom, Charlotte by Valorie Curry, Mary by Toni Trucks and Randall by Bill Tangradi.

=== Denali coven ===
Eleazar and his mate Carmen, Tanya, Kate, and later Kate's mate, Garrett, are members of the Denali coven. They originally resided in Slovakia, but after Sasha and Vasilii's executions, they moved to Denali, Alaska. Like the Cullens, the Denali coven practices a diet of drinking animal instead of human blood. They are considered to be cousins of the Cullen family, though the relationship is put under strain in Eclipse when they refuse to fight Victoria and her army because of Irina's vendetta against the werewolves. Tanya, their leader, has strawberry blonde hair and once expressed an interest in Edward Cullen, though he turned her down. Carmen speaks fluent Spanish and was the first to listen to and not fear Renesmee for being a half-breed. Eleazar, a former member of the Volturi guard, speaks fluent Spanish as well and has the ability to vaguely identify the gifts of other vampires. Garrett, a tall, rangy vampire with ruby eyes and long sandy hair, is an adventurer, and is a veteran of the American Revolutionary War, fighting alongside his fellow Patriots, and for the liberty of his Newborn Nation. He joins the Denali coven in Breaking Dawn and becomes Kate's mate. Kate's special ability is the production of an electric current over her skin that can shock and incapacitate attackers. She assists Bella in learning to use her new ability to mentally shield those around her.

Sasha, Vasilii, and Irina were former members of the Denali coven. Sasha, who created Tanya, Kate, Irina, and Vasilii, was executed by the Volturi for creating an immortal child, Vasilii. Volturi law prohibits creating an immortal child, as they are unpredictable and have no self-control. For this reason, both Sasha and Vasilii were destroyed, and since then the Denalis have maintained respect for Volturi law. Laurent was Irina's mate, and she holds a grudge against the Quileute wolves for destroying him. She arrives to make peace with the Cullens in Breaking Dawn, but before speaking with them, she sees Renesmee, mistakenly assumes she is an immortal child, and notifies the Volturi. After determining that Renesmee is not an immortal child, the Volturi summarily executed Irina in order to provoke her sisters into attacking them, thus giving them an excuse to destroy them along with the Cullens and their allies.

In both parts of The Twilight Saga: Breaking Dawn, the Denalis are portrayed by MyAnna Buring as Tanya, Christian Camargo as Eleazar, Maggie Grace as Irina, Mía Maestro as Carmen, Casey LaBow as Kate, and Lee Pace as Garrett. Sasha is portrayed by Andrea Powell.

=== Egyptian coven ===
Tia, Amun, Benjamin, and Kebi are members of the Egyptian coven. The coven is said to be the oldest vampire coven in existence, predating even the Romanian coven. They were once rivals with the Romanian coven until the Volturi's rise in power, after which the Volturi decimated both groups while taking away any gifted vampires the Egyptians had, including Demetri, who was created by the coven's leader, Amun. Amun, the mate of Kebi, is shown to be very unhappy to stand witness for the Cullens in Breaking Dawn, and he and Kebi later flee in fear of the Volturi. Benjamin, the mate of Tia, has a high awareness of what is right and wrong, and his special ability is to control the elements of nature, air, earth, fire, and water. Benjamin's ability is unique in that it involves physical manipulation, as opposed to illusions of the mind. This fact is what made Amun very protective of him, in fear of losing him to the Volturi.

In The Twilight Saga: Breaking Dawn - Part II, the members of the Egyptian coven are portrayed by Rami Malek as Benjamin, Omar Metwally as Amun, Angela Sarafyan as Tia, and Andrea Gabriel as Kebi.

=== European nomads ===
Alistair, Charles, and Makenna are European nomads. Alistair considers Carlisle to be his oldest friend, though he does not visit him often and is highly standoffish. His special ability is tracking. When he is called to be a witness for the Cullens in Breaking Dawn, he leaves out of fear of the Volturi. Charles is the mate of Makenna, and his special ability is to sense if a statement is true.

Alistair is portrayed by British actor Joe Anderson.

=== Irish coven ===
Siobhan, Liam, and Maggie are members of the Irish coven. Liam is Siobhan's mate. Siobhan's suspected special ability is to alter the course of a situation through willpower. Maggie, a redhead, has the ability to sense if someone is lying. They were called upon to witness for the Cullen clan in face of the Volturi in Breaking Dawn.

In The Twilight Saga: Breaking Dawn - Part II, the members of the Irish coven are portrayed by Marlane Barnes (as Maggie), Lisa Howard (as Siobhan), and Patrick Brennan (as Liam).

=== Romanian coven ===
Vladimir and Stefan used to rule the vampire world along with other Romanian vampires about 1500 years ago. The Volturi overthrew them and destroyed their castle. After the rebellion, it became apparent that Vladimir and Stefan were the only survivors of their coven. They hold a grudge against the Volturi and are willing to do anything for revenge, and so they eagerly serve as witnesses in Breaking Dawn, hoping to watch the Volturi fall.

In The Twilight Saga: Breaking Dawn - Part II, the Romanian coven are portrayed by Noel Fisher (as Vladimir) and Guri Weinberg (as Stefan).

=== Ticuna coven ===
Nahuel is a Mapuche vampire/human hybrid conceived by human Pire and vampire Joham about 150 years ago. From his father, Nahuel has three half-sisters: the Norwegian Serena, the Algerian Maysun, and the American Jennifer, all of whom are also vampire/human hybrids. His mother died giving birth to him, and when he was born, he bit his aunt, Huilen, who hated him for causing her sister's death, causing her transformation into a vampire. He is thus the only known hybrid who produces venom, in contrast to his half-sisters and Renesmee. He refused to join his father's family, and stayed with Huilen. Knowing that he was the one who killed his mother, Nahuel blamed himself for this. He was found by Kachiri, Alice Cullen and Jasper Hale in Chile to seek his aid in protecting their family. By finding the other hybrid, Renesmee Cullen, and meeting her family, he begins to realize that he himself may not be as evil as he had always thought and learned to forgive himself for his mother's death.

Nahuel is portrayed by J. D. Pardo in The Twilight Saga: Breaking Dawn – Part 2.

Huilen is a Mapuche vampire and the older sister of Pire. She was turned by her nephew, Nahuel, who is a half-human, half-vampire. Huilen and Nahuel came to Forks with Alice Cullen and Jasper Hale to witness against the Volturi that Renesmee, another half-human, half-vampire hybrid, wasn't a threat to the vampires' secret world. After the Volturi left, she stayed behind with her nephew during celebration and was one of the last to leave. Bella assumed that she and Nahuel would have gone with the Amazon Coven, but they departed earlier.

In the film The Twilight Saga: Breaking Dawn – Part 2, Huilen is portrayed by actress Marisa Quinn.

=== Unknown Coven ===
Toshiro is a Japanese vampire. He was tracked down and surrounded by the Volturi in London. He denied siding with Carlisle but Aro saw elsewise upon reading Toshiro's mind and had him executed.

In the film The Twilight Saga: Breaking Dawn – Part 2, Toshiro is portrayed by actor Masami Kosaka.

== Werewolves ==
The werewolf pack in The Twilight Saga: Eclipse. From left to right: Paul, Embry, Jacob, Sam, Jared, Quil, and Leah.

According to the Twilight series, the Quileute tribe legends hold that chiefs could leave their bodies and wander as spirits, communicate with nature, command nature (weather, trees, insects, animals) and hear each other's thoughts; however, apart from the latter, many of these techniques appear to have been forgotten. In Twilight, members of this tribe can still phase in and out of their shape-shifting forms, transforming independently of the lunar cycles. Members are able to regenerate, talk to one another telepathically, and possess superhuman strength, speed and endurance with the ability to cover 1.67 miles (2.7 km) in just 1 minute, outrunning vampires. Werewolves' skins are durable and their regenerative abilities allow them to heal within seconds. They are also immune to vampirism, though the venom does act as a mild irritant and inhibits their healing abilities to some degree. As long as they phase, they do not age. Their body temperature is around 108 °F (42 °C), which Bella as a vampire in Breaking Dawn describes as "touching an open fire". Jacob is an Alpha male thus possesses the unique ability to command the clan telepathically and forcibly, regardless of individual resistance. They possess immunity to vampire bites and some vampire special abilities, such as Alice's premonitions. In human form shape-shifters can use the style of free running to get to hard-to-reach places.

In the Twilight universe, werewolves' claws and teeth can tear through the "marble hard skin" of a vampire at ease. Each werewolf has a different look and different specific quality, whether size, speed, agility, stamina, durability or strength, Jacob being the strongest of the pack. All shapeshifters' senses are very sharp (including ophthalmoception, audioception, olfacoception, and equilibrioception). Within the series, they can also imprint, which channels all of a werewolf's affections towards a single person. A shapeshifter in human form retains many enhanced abilities and in human form is described as lifting Bella like an "empty box". The shapeshifting werewolves of the Quileute tribe are typically dark-haired, dark-skinned, and dark-eyed, and they also prefer to eat animal meat. Genetically, Carlisle discovers that werewolves have 24 pairs of chromosomes, the same as vampire hybrids like Renesmee, sparking speculation on Jacob and Renesmee having children, given that both had human maternal parents. At the end of the fourth book, it is revealed that they are indeed shape-shifters. Aro claims shape-shifters can take other mega-animal forms and Edward says that Caius is terrified of true werewolves because of an encounter with one centuries ago, leaving him almost obliterated. These true werewolves are called the "Children of the Moon" and these involuntarily phase in the full moon.

=== Sam Uley ===
Sam Uley is the Alpha, or leader, and oldest member of the La Push pack. He is first introduced in Twilight, where his aversion toward the Cullens eventually leads Bella to discover that they are vampires, but is given a larger role in New Moon. His father, Joshua Uley, abandoned him and his mother when he was young, and Sam was thus forced to assume much adult responsibility at an early age. He is 19 when he first appears in the series, was the first wolf to phase, and is described as the calmest and most mature of his pack brothers. Before transforming, he dated Leah Clearwater, whom he is said to have loved. But because he was forbidden to tell her what he had become, their relationship fell apart and ended when he imprinted on Leah's cousin, Emily Young, and broke every promise he had made to Leah. According to Jacob, Sam feels guilty for betraying Leah and responsible for the bitter person she has become; he is also pained that his lack of control over his phasing one day led to the deep scars on Emily's face. All of this causes him to hate the Cullens, whom he blames for both his transformation and for causing him to break Leah's heart. The oncoming army of newborn vampires in Eclipse, however, forces him to work together with the Cullens, and at the end of the novel it is suggested that he has begun to trust Carlisle.

His fur is pure black when he phases, and he was the largest wolf until Breaking Dawn, in which it is noted that Jacob has grown taller than him. He is not Alpha by blood; that role belongs to Jacob, who initially refused the position although Sam willingly offered it to him. Sam's status as pack Alpha technically makes him, as Jacob explains in Eclipse, the chief of the whole tribe. It also makes his pack brothers subject to any direct commands he gives them, though he dislikes taking their free will away from them and does so only when necessary, such as for coordination during fights. He proves to be highly protective of not only the tribe, but of all humans, and even goes so far as to plan an attack on the Cullens in Breaking Dawn because of the threat he believes Bella's unborn, half-vampire child presents. This sparks a conflict between him and Jacob, causing the latter to split from the pack. At the end of the series, Quil, Embry, and the Clearwaters join Jacob's pack, leaving Sam to lead the remaining wolves.

Solomon Trimble was credited as "Jacob's friend" in the Twilight film, but was widely recognized as playing the role of Sam. In The Twilight Saga: New Moon and The Twilight Saga: Eclipse, Sam is portrayed by Chaske Spencer.

=== Quil Ateara V ===
Quil Ateara V has chocolate-brown fur in wolf form and is Jacob's best friend and second cousin. He is 16, and is described as muscular and loud. Upon meeting her, he takes an instant liking to Bella, who notes that he has a mischievous grin, and flirts with her. He first appears in New Moon but does not become a wolf until Eclipse. In New Moon Bella notes his depression over being abandoned by Embry and Jacob, who joined the pack and were not allowed to tell him what was going on. Unlike most of the other pack members, he was happy about becoming a wolf because it allowed him to join his friends. Near the end of Breaking Dawn Quil, along with Embry, joins Jacob's pack.

In Eclipse, Quil imprints on Emily Young's two-year-old niece, Claire. Although this appears to cause a scandal, Jacob explains that there is currently nothing romantic about his feelings, and that Quil will be whatever Claire needs him to be at each point in her life, whether it be a brother, friend, protector, or lover.

Quil is portrayed by Tyson Houseman in The Twilight Saga: New Moon and The Twilight Saga: Eclipse.

=== Embry Call ===
Embry Call is a wolf with gray fur and dark spots on his back, and is another one of Jacob's best friends. He is described as tall, thin, and shy, and is 16 when he first appears in New Moon. He calls Bella "vampire girl" because of her relationship with the Cullens. His mother is of the Makah tribe, not the Quileute, and she moved to the Quileute reservation while she was pregnant with him; until he joined the pack, it was assumed that she had left his father behind. However, the shape-shifting trait is present only in the Black, Ateara, and Uley bloodlines, with other families being included through marriage; by carrying the trait, Embry is therefore the half-brother of either Quil Ateara V, Jacob Black, or Sam Uley. This causes some stress within the pack, since all three of those boys' fathers were married before and at the time of Embry's birth. Near the end of Breaking Dawn, Embry, along with Quil, joins Jacob's pack.

Embry is portrayed by Kiowa Gordon in The Twilight Saga: New Moon and The Twilight Saga: Eclipse.

=== Paul Lahote ===
Paul Lahote is a dark gray wolf who is prone to angry outbursts that cause him to burst into his wolf form. At 16, he was the third wolf to phase. He is the most volatile pack member, and becomes so enraged when he learns that Jacob has told Bella about the pack that he bursts into his wolf form and tries to attack her. He later seems to have no ill feelings toward Bella or Jacob, though Jacob, Leah, and some of the other wolves find him annoying. In Breaking Dawn, it is revealed that Paul has imprinted on Jacob's older sister, Rachel. This irritates Billy and Jacob because he is always at their house eating their food, but Billy is happy that Rachel visits home more often because of Paul.

Paul is portrayed by Alex Meraz in The Twilight Saga: New Moon and The Twilight Saga: Eclipse.

=== Jared Cameron ===
Jared Cameron was the first wolf to phase after Sam. In Eclipse, it's revealed that he imprinted on Kim, a girl he sat next to in school who had always had a crush on him. Before he was a wolf he never paid attention to her, but after his transformation he looked at her once and imprinted.

Bronson Pelletier portrays Jared in The Twilight Saga: New Moon and The Twilight Saga: Eclipse. Though Jared's personality is never really explored in the novels and he remains somewhat of a background character, it has been noted that Jared's portrayal in the films reflects Pelletier's own joking, light-hearted personality.

=== Leah Clearwater ===
Leah Clearwater is the only known female shape-shifting wolf in the history of the Quileute tribe. She is the smallest wolf, has light gray fur, and is the fastest in the pack. At the age of 19, she transforms into a wolf during the events of New Moon, around the same time as her younger brother, Seth. This transformation is believed to be what caused the heart attack and subsequent death of their father, Harry. She dated Sam Uley for years until her second cousin Emily came to visit and Sam imprinted on her. Sam thus left her for Emily, leaving Leah broken-hearted. She puts up a brave face, though, and in Eclipse it is suggested that she intends to serve as bridesmaid at Sam and Emily's wedding. Despite this, she is disliked by her pack brothers for her very bitter and cynical attitude. She constantly antagonizes the pack by thinking about things that make the others uncomfortable, such as Embry's paternity.

In Breaking Dawn, Leah joins Jacob's pack with the intention of breaking free of Sam, since she is still heartbroken. She helps to protect Bella and the Cullens, despite her extreme hatred for vampires and her open dislike for Bella. She shares her insecurities with Jacob, such as the reasons for Sam's imprinting on Emily, her regrets that she might be menopausal due to her transformation, and her inability to rise higher in pack rank due to her gender. As she spends more time in Jacob's pack, she becomes happier, makes notable changes in her attitude, and is less negative. Later in the book, Jacob and Leah's feelings toward each other become a trusted comradeship, though they conceal their fondness for each other by constantly bickering. She displays quite a bit of loyalty to him, and even angrily confronts Bella about her unfair treatment of Jacob and the pain she has caused him. By the end of the novel, Leah has replaced Seth as Jacob's second-in-command.

In The Twilight Saga: Eclipse, Leah is portrayed by Julia Jones.

=== Seth Clearwater ===
Seth Clearwater is Leah's younger brother. He transformed into a wolf during the events of New Moon, around the same time as his sister, Leah. He has sandy-colored fur, and at 15 he is among the youngest of the pack. In New Moon and Eclipse, he is shown to idolize Jacob Black and is said to remind Bella of a younger Jacob. Like Quil, he is excited by his ability to transform into a wolf and not unhappy with it, as his other pack brothers are. During the newborn attack in Eclipse, Seth stays with Bella and Edward due to his youth and acts as a connection to the pack because of the wolves' telepathic ability. When Victoria and Riley appear, Seth fights and destroys Riley with Edward's help. In Breaking Dawn he is shown to have developed an unlikely friendship with Edward, and attends his and Bella's wedding. When Jacob splits from the pack, Seth quickly joined him because he opposes Sam's plan to attack the Cullens, whom he has become fond of. For most of Breaking Dawn, Seth is Jacob's second-in-command, until he is replaced by Leah at the end of the novel. He is initially the only wolf to feel completely comfortable being around the Cullen family, and becomes friendly with them by the end of the series.

Although young, Seth appears to have sharp mind and quick thinking as he was the first to oppose the assault towards the Cullens because the pack refused to consult with the Elders (which they were supposed to do and initially aborted the mission due to lack of offensive force) and he was the first to recognize that Jacob isn't thinking properly when he wanted to attack the Cullens after Bella's arrival from Brazil due to the treaty without proper investigation. Seth was also the first one to discover that different pack has their own mental link and convinced both Jacob and the Cullens that Sam's pack will not launch an assault due to lack members because it will be a suicide mission for Sam if he did. He also has, according to Edward, very honest and pure thoughts, something that endears him to the Cullens, and Edward in particular.

In The Twilight Saga: Eclipse, Seth is played by Booboo Stewart.

=== Collin Littlesea and Brady Fuller ===
Collin Littlesea and Brady Fuller are two of the youngest wolves in the pack. Collin is Jacob's first cousin, while Brady is distantly related to the Clearwater siblings. In Eclipse, they are said to have phased at the age of thirteen without their parents' knowledge, and they later make an appearance in Breaking Dawn as part of Sam's pack.

Collin and Brady are portrayed by Brayden Jimmie and Swo-wo Gabriel, respectively, in The Twilight Saga: Breaking Dawn - Part 1.

=== Others ===
There are seven additional wolves present at the end of Breaking Dawn. These unknown wolves are believed to be very young because of their oversized paws. The reason for their transformations is the presence of many visiting vampires at the Cullen residence.

=== Ephraim Black ===
Ephraim Black, great-grandfather to Jacob Black, was the last chief of the Quileute tribe. He was a shape-shifter himself, and the Alpha of a pack of three which included Levi Uley and Quil Ateara Sr., the great-grandfathers of Sam Uley and Quil Ateara, respectively. He created a treaty with the Cullen family which maintained that the wolves would not expose the Cullens as vampires as long as they did not bite any humans.

== Humans ==
=== Charlie Swan ===
Charlie Swan is Bella Swan's father and works as police chief in Forks. His hobbies include fishing with Harry Clearwater and Billy Black, as well as watching various sports on TV. Charlie married Bella's mother, Renée, just after they both graduated from high school, and they soon had Bella. Renée divorced Charlie not long after and moved to Phoenix, Arizona with Bella. Bella later mentions that Charlie still has not quite gotten over her mother. He became accustomed to living alone, except when Bella visited him in the summer. When Bella is seventeen, she moves to Forks to live with him after her mother remarries. Initially, Charlie accepts Edward as his daughter's boyfriend, but after the events of New Moon he blames Edward for Bella's deep depression after he left her. Charlie grounded Bella when she left without talking to him in New Moon. Charlie is grateful to Jacob Black for his friendship with Bella during that difficult time, and he makes it clear that he'd rather Bella choose Jacob over Edward. Charlie ungrounds Bella in Eclipse and wants her to spend some time with Jacob. At the end of Eclipse, Bella and Edward agree to tell Charlie about their engagement, and he is shown to have reluctantly agreed to the marriage at the beginning of Breaking Dawn. Charlie stays in Bella's life after her transformation; though he comes to suspect that Bella and the Cullens are not quite human, he is never informed that they are vampires though he is informed that Jacob is a werewolf. Nevertheless, he is introduced to his granddaughter, Renesmee, and is shown to be very fond of her. At the end of Breaking Dawn, he and Sue Clearwater have developed a romantic relationship.

Charlie is portrayed by Billy Burke in the Twilight film series.

=== Renée Dwyer ===
Renée Dwyer (formerly Renée Swan) married Charlie Swan right after high school, but left with their baby, Bella, and divorced him soon after. Renée is an eccentric, silly person who tends to brave new, risky things and then come to her senses later. Bella always felt herself to be the mother in their relationship, having to guide Renée away from doing ridiculous things, and Renée considered Bella her "middle-aged" child. After Renée remarries a much younger baseball player, Phil Dwyer, Bella sends herself to live with her father in Forks so that Renée and Phil can travel together. Edward describes Renée's mind as being insightful and almost childlike. In Breaking Dawn, Bella is scared to tell her mother about her engagement to Edward because of Renée's strong opposition to young people marrying early, but Renée gives them her blessing. It is said that Bella resembles her mother, but that Renée has shorter hair and laugh lines. In Twilight she lives in Phoenix, Arizona, and in Jacksonville, Florida throughout the rest of the series. After Bella becomes a vampire she does not visit her mother, knowing Renée would never adapt to her change as Charlie did.

Renée is portrayed by Sarah Clarke in Twilight, The Twilight Saga: Eclipse, and The Twilight Saga: Breaking Dawn - Part 1.

=== Harry Clearwater ===
Harry Clearwater was an elder of the Quileute tribe who died of a heart attack in New Moon. He left behind a wife, Sue, a daughter Leah, and a son, Seth. After Bella learns that Jacob is a werewolf, it is Harry and Billy Black who keep Charlie Swan occupied in La Push to protect him from Victoria and her army of newborn vampires.

Harry is portrayed by Graham Greene in The Twilight Saga: New Moon.

=== Billy Black ===
Billy Black is Jacob Black's father, born and raised in La Push, and an elder of the Quileute tribe. He is described as being heavyset, having a wrinkled face and russet skin, and having black hair and black eyes. His other family members include his two daughters, Rachel and Rebecca, and his deceased wife, Sarah. Billy Black is directly descended from the last chief of the Quileute tribe, Ephraim Black, who was his father. Among Billy's best friends in Forks is Bella Swan's father, Charlie Swan. Billy, who has diabetes and uses a wheelchair, sells his truck to Charlie to give to Bella. At the end of Twilight, he employed Jacob to persuade Bella to break up with Edward Cullen. He becomes a semi-regular character throughout the remaining series.

Billy Black is portrayed by Gil Birmingham in Twilight, The Twilight Saga: New Moon, and The Twilight Saga: Eclipse.

=== Tyler Crowley ===
Tyler Crowley is one of Bella's classmates. In Twilight he nearly hits Bella with his van, but she is saved by Edward. Afterward, Tyler is desperate to make it up to her, bombarding her with constant apologies and asking her to a school dance, to which she refuses. He mistakenly assumes she will go to their prom with him and tells the rest of the school, only to hear from Edward that Bella will be unavailable to anyone but himself. His constant attention toward Bella causes Lauren, who is interested in him, to resent Bella.

Tyler is portrayed by Gregory Tyree Boyce in the Twilight film.

=== Lauren Mallory ===
Lauren Mallory is a silver blonde, fishy-eyed student at Bella's high school. Despite being popular herself, she becomes jealous over the attention Bella receives after she moves to Forks and remains hostile toward her throughout the series. She is particularly jealous when Tyler Crowley, on whom Lauren has a crush, pays attention to Bella. She also tends to speak in a rather sneering tone, which Bella notices when she overhears Lauren talking about her.

In the films, Lauren's character was combined with that of Jessica Stanley, who is played by Anna Kendrick.

=== Mike Newton ===
Mike Newton is a friendly boy who initially has a crush on Bella, though Bella does not return his affections. In Twilight, he is described as a "cute, baby-faced boy" with "carefully" spiked "pale blond" hair. He crushes on Bella throughout the series and often asks her to accompany him on dates, though she always declines; he is also shown to be quite bitter and jealous over Bella and Edward's relationship. In New Moon, Mike goes to the movies with Jacob and Bella and tries hard to compete with Jacob for Bella's attention. Mike's family owns a local sporting goods store, which serves as Bella's only job in the series. Mike and Jessica date in Twilight and are together again in Breaking Dawn at Bella and Edward's wedding, where Edward irritatedly comments that "Mike's having difficulty with improper thoughts about a married woman", suggesting that Mike is still attracted to Bella.

Mike is portrayed by Michael Welch in Twilight, The Twilight Saga: New Moon and The Twilight Saga: Eclipse.

=== Jessica Stanley ===
Jessica Stanley is Bella's classmate and her first friend in Forks. She informs Bella about the Cullen family on her first day at school. She tends to be more interested in Bella's popularity than Bella's actual character, and is sometimes jealous of Mike's attention toward Bella. In Midnight Sun, Edward hears that Jessica's thoughts toward Bella are actually quite rude, and that she only befriended Bella to share in her attention. Jessica is described as a petite "chatterbox" with curly dark hair. She and Bella have a falling out in New Moon because of Bella's social withdrawal, depression, and increasingly reckless behavior due to Edward's departure, but their friendship ends on a good note at graduation during Eclipse. Jessica appears briefly in Breaking Dawn as a guest at Bella and Edward's wedding, which she attends with Mike. Jessica is valedictorian of her graduating class in the film version of Eclipse.

Jessica is portrayed by Anna Kendrick in Twilight, The Twilight Saga: New Moon, The Twilight Saga: Eclipse and The Twilight Saga: Breaking Dawn – Part 1.

=== Angela Weber ===
Angela Weber is a friend and classmate of Bella's who is described as a tall, shy, quiet, and very kind girl. In an excerpt from Midnight Sun, she is revealed to be among the few of Bella's newly acquired "friends" who do not exploit Bella's popularity to their own advantage. She has light brown hair and soft brown eyes. She respects other people's space, a characteristic much appreciated by Bella, and has a gentle disposition. Angela plays a minor role in the series but soon becomes Bella's best human friend. She has a strong relationship with her boyfriend, Ben Cheney. In Breaking Dawn her role is limited; her father reads Bella and Edward's vows at their wedding, and she catches Bella's bouquet.

Angela is portrayed by Christian Serratos in Twilight, The Twilight Saga: New Moon and The Twilight Saga: Eclipse.

=== Eric Yorkie ===
Eric Yorkie is a classmate of Bella's who immediately became interested in her when she moved to Forks. He is described as an "overly helpful" chess-club type, is very tall, has a poor complexion, and has "hair as black as an oil slick". He resents Mike's similar interest in Bella, and, later in Twilight, is seen walking away after Mike is hit with a snowball. He invites Bella to a school dance, but she declines, and he goes with Angela Weber instead. Eric is valedictorian of his graduating class in the book Eclipse.

Eric is portrayed by Justin Chon in Twilight, The Twilight Saga: New Moon and The Twilight Saga: Eclipse.

=== Emily Young ===
Emily Young is Sam Uley's fiancée and second cousin to Leah and Seth Clearwater. She is described as having copper skin, raven black hair, and three long disfiguring scars running down the right side of her face and down her arms as the result of Sam's accidental loss of control in phasing when standing close to her. Emily is from the Makah tribe and lived there for most of her life, only visiting La Push for special occasions until her imprinting by Sam, after which she moved permanently to a cottage in La Push. Though she and Leah are only second cousins, it is said that they were like sisters when they were young. While dating Leah, Sam imprinted upon Emily when she was visiting in La Push and began pursuing her. She was initially furious with him and rejected his advances; however, the adoration and loyalty that result from imprinting are difficult for the one who was imprinted on to resist, and the accident eventually brought them together.

Emily, who is described as a cheerful, friendly person, befriends Bella in New Moon. The left side of her face is extremely beautiful, as she was before the scars, which pull one of her eyes down and tug on the side of her mouth, causing her to have a scowl on one side of her face. Despite this, Emily bears no resentment towards Sam or any other members of the pack, and it is noted that the pack members have become her family. She often cooks for them and they appear to feel very comfortable and open in her house.

Emily is portrayed by Tinsel Korey in The Twilight Saga: New Moon and The Twilight Saga: Eclipse.

=== Sue Clearwater ===
Sue Clearwater (born Sue Uley) is the widow of Harry Clearwater, who died in New Moon of a heart attack. Sue has two children, Seth and Leah, who are both werewolves. In Breaking Dawn, Sue starts spending a lot of time with Charlie and occasionally cooks him meals after Bella moves out of his house. Near the end of Breaking Dawn, Bella hints that Sue and Charlie are romantically involved.

Sue is portrayed by Alex Rice in The Twilight Saga: Eclipse and both of The Twilight Saga: Breaking Dawn films.

=== Quil Ateara III ===
Quil Ateara III is the paternal grandfather of Quil Ateara V, one of the members of the current werewolf pack. He is married to Molly Swan (a distant relative of Charlie Swan) and raised his grandson after the death of his son, Quil Ateara IV. He also advised Sam Uley when the latter was about to phase for the first time, having waited for his and Quil's destinies for a long time. In Eclipse, elder Quil and Billy recite to the Quileute tribe the legend about the "Cold Ones", which Bella listens to.

Elder Quil appears uncredited in The Twilight Saga: Eclipse film.

=== Rachel and Rebecca Black ===
Rachel and Rebecca Black are the twin daughters of Billy and Sarah Black and the older sisters of Jacob by four years. Bella is already acquainted with them before her permanent relocation to Forks, though not to the same extent as she does with Jacob. The two dislike living in Forks as they are unable to completely cope with Sarah's death and had moved out of the town at the start of the series: Rachel to attend the Washington State University in Pullman, and Rebecca to marry a Samoan surfer, Solomon Finau and move to Hawaii. In Breaking Dawn, Rachel returns to Forks following her graduation, initially for a brief visit that turns into something permanent when Paul Lahote, Jacob's fellow werewolf member, imprints on her. While she reciprocates this affection, Jacob is annoyed as this means that Paul can visit the Black residence frequently, mostly to raid their food, though Billy is glad that Rachel visits home more often because of Paul.

Rachel is portrayed by Tanaya Beatty in The Twilight Saga: Breaking Dawn – Part 1 film.

=== J. Jenks ===
Jason Jenks (alias Jason Scott) is a middle aged, balding attorney and forger of legal documents. Alice sends Bella to him when it seems likely that Renesmee and Jacob will need to go on the run to escape the Volturi. Jenks, having previously worked with Jasper several times, has a great fear of the Cullen family due to Jasper's belief that "some kinds of working relationships are better motivated by fear than by monetary gain". Bella employs Jenks to forge birth certificates, passports, and a driver's license for Jacob and Renesmee, and over the course of their relationship he starts to become more comfortable around her than he is with Jasper. An honorable man, he initially expresses reservations about giving Bella the documents she requests, under the belief that she intends to use them to kidnap Renesmee from her father, despite his fear that this might earn him the Cullen family's retribution. Bella assures him that this is not the case, and she decides afterwards to take over all relations with Jenks in order to spare him any further stress that Jasper might cause him.

J. Jenks is played by Wendell Pierce in The Twilight Saga: Breaking Dawn – Part 2.
