= New Moon (novel) =

Second novel in the Twilight Saga by Stephenie Meyer

- First edition cover
- Author: Stephenie Meyer
- Cover artist: Gail Doobinin (design); John Grant (photograph)
- Language: English
- Series: Twilight series
- Genre: Young adult, romance novel, vampire fiction
- Publisher: Little, Brown
- Publication date: August 21, 2006 (US hardcover); September 6, 2006 (hardcover); February 26, 2009 (kindle)
- Publication place: United States
- Media type: Print (Hardcover, Paperback) e-Book (Kindle); Audio Book (CD)
- Pages: 563
- ISBN: 0-316-16019-9
- OCLC: 69104227
- LC Class: PZ7.M5717515 New 2006
- Preceded by: Twilight
- Followed by: Eclipse

New Moon (stylized as new moon) is a 2006 romantic fantasy novel by author Stephenie Meyer. The second installment in the Twilight series, the novel continues the story of Bella Swan and her relationship with vampire Edward Cullen as she enters her senior year of high school. Everything changes for Bella when Edward’s brother Jasper almost attacks her on her eighteenth birthday, leading to Edward and his family moving away to protect Bella. Bella sinks into a depression in the months following Edward’s departure, but she begins to heal as she grows closer to her friend Jacob Black. However, her life twists once more when Jacob’s nature reveals itself, prompting a surprise visit from Edward’s sister Alice and a harrowing, spur-of-the-moment trip to Italy as Bella and Edward’s fate hangs in the balance.

The book was originally released in hardcover on September 6, 2006, with an initial print run of 100,000 copies. Upon its publication in the United States, New Moon was highly successful and moved quickly to the top of bestseller lists, becoming one of the most anticipated books of the year. It peaked at #1 on both the New York Times Best Seller list and USA Today's Top 150 Bestsellers, and was the biggest selling children's paperback of 2008 with over 5.3 million copies sold. Moreover, New Moon was the best-selling book of 2009 and has been translated into 38 languages. A film adaptation of the book was released on November 20, 2009.

Reception for New Moon was more positive than that for its predecessor. Some criticized the middle section's pacing; critics generally, however, argued the novel was more mature in tone, praising the character development and its depiction of human emotion.

== Plot ==
On Bella Swan's eighteenth birthday, Edward Cullen, the vampire she loves, and his family throw her a birthday party at their residence. While unwrapping a gift, Bella receives a paper cut. Edward's adopted brother, Jasper, is overwhelmed by the scent of her blood and attempts to attack her. Trying to protect her, Edward and the Cullens move away from Forks, but in an attempt to encourage Bella to move on, Edward tells her it is because he no longer loves her. With Edward's departure, Bella suffers severe memory loss and depression for several months.

In the months that follow, Bella learns that thrill-seeking activities, such as motorcycle riding and cliff-diving, allow her to "hear" Edward's voice in her head through her subconscious mind. She also seeks comfort in her deepening friendship with Jacob Black, a cheerful companion who eases her pain over losing Edward. Sometime after losing Edward, Bella starts to enjoy Jacob's company and friendship. After spending some time with Bella, Jacob starts experiencing some unexpected and drastic changes in his mood swings, body, and personality. Jacob disappears while he undergoes a very long, painful, and life-altering transformation, causing Bella and Charlie to become concerned when he stops returning Bella’s calls. When Bella and Jacob reconnect a few weeks later, Bella senses that Jacob isn't as happy-go-lucky as he once was. She is uncomfortable with Jacob’s recent changes, noting that he has become more aloof and secretive. Shortly thereafter, she discovers that Jacob has unwillingly become a werewolf and that other Quileute tribe members can transform into werewolves too. Jacob and his pack protect Bella from the vampire, Laurent, who was a part of James' coven, and also Victoria, who seeks revenge for her dead mate, James, whom the Cullens had killed in the previous installment. Jacob forms romantic feelings for Bella, but she doesn't feel the same, having not gotten over her breakup with Edward. This only fuels Jacob's dislike of Edward. Jacob then saves Bella from drowning after the latter jumps off a cliff into the ocean and almost kisses her in the events following.

Meanwhile, a series of miscommunications leads Edward to believe that Bella has committed suicide by jumping off a cliff. Distraught over her suspected suicide, Edward flees to Volterra, Italy to provoke the Volturi, vampire royalty who are capable of killing him, though they refuse, deeming his mind-reading ability to be too valuable. In contrast to Edward's rash reaction to the news of Bella's death, Alice Cullen cleverly makes a surprise visit to Bella's house, which overwhelms Bella. Bella asks a series of questions, and Alice tells her that she saw Bella trying to kill herself in one of her visions. Bella insists that she was not attempting suicide and was only seeking a thrilling experience. Alice becomes confused, yet quickly realizes that the werewolves create blind spots in her visions, which is why she does not see Jacob rescuing Bella from the ocean. As Alice's visions about Edward change rapidly, Alice and Bella are unable to clearly understand whether Edward is or will be safe. They rush to Italy to prevent Edward from revealing himself to humans so the Volturi are forced to kill him, arriving just in time to stop him. Before leaving Italy, the Volturi tell Edward that Bella, a human who knows that vampires exist, must either be killed or transformed into a vampire to protect the secret. When they return to Forks, Edward tells Bella that he has always loved her and only left Forks to protect her. She forgives him, and the Cullens vote in favor of Bella being transformed into a vampire, to Rosalie and Edward's dismay. However, Jacob sternly reminds Edward about an important part of their treaty: if the Cullens bite a human for any reason, the treaty is over and the wolves will attack. When Bella reminds him that it is none of his concern as being a vampire is what she wants, Jacob reveals it is his business as she doesn't understand what's going to be at stake for her and the Cullens. Before he can continue warning her, they hear an angry Charlie asking Bella to get inside the house at once. Jacob apologizes to Bella once more before leaving, and the story concludes with Charlie grounding Bella for running off to Italy.

== Differences between film and novel ==
- In the book, Bella has a job at the local sporting goods store that is owned by Mike Newton's family. After Edward leaves town, Bella continues to go to school and work to keep up appearances, hoping that Charlie won’t send her to live with her mother. In the movie, Bella is not employed and is shown sitting at her bedroom window for months while she grieves Edward’s disappearance.
- Bella never confronts Sam in his werewolf form in the novel, but rather in his human form, and his fiancée Emily later explains everything to her. The film has her confronting him in his wolf form.
- In the book, Jacob confronts Bella and Edward outside her house. The confrontation happens in the woods in the film.
- Unlike in the film where Charlie grounds Bella after she runs off to Italy, Charlie grounds her after he sees her with Edward at their house in the novel's conclusion.
- In the novel's end, Edward never proposes to Bella, but rather walks her in the house to explain what happened to Charlie. The film omits this.
- In the novel, Edward doesn't try to stop Jane when she attempts, and fails, to use her pain-inducing abilities on Bella. In the film, he does try to intervene and gets hurt mentally.
- In the novel Bella realizes that when she puts herself in danger, she unintentionally hears Edward's voice in her mind. In the film, she hears his voice yet can also see his ghostly figure.
- In the book, readers are introduced to the members of the wolf pack and other Quileute tribal members. The novel reveals that Harry Clearwater has a heart attack caused by his daughter, Leah's, first phase into a wolf. In the film it shows that Harry dies because Victoria attacks him in the woods.

== Development ==
After Meyer finished writing Twilight, she found herself writing multiple hundred-page epilogues and has said, "I quickly realized I wasn't ready to stop writing about Bella and Edward." She began writing a sequel, which was entitled Forever Dawn and skipped over Bella's final year of high school. While Meyer was still writing Forever Dawn, she learned that Twilight was going to be published and marketed as a young-adult novel. Wanting the next book to be aimed at a similar audience, she decided to write a new sequel, New Moon, which took place during Bella's senior year of high school. Therefore, Meyer started writing the outline of the book and thinking of what her characters would do, and claims that she "swiftly regretted asking them for the story." She didn't like the idea of Edward leaving at first and tried to think of other plot options, but, in the end, she said that "she accepted the inevitability of it."

According to Meyer, the book is about losing true love. The title refers to the darkest phase of the lunar cycle, indicating that New Moon is about the darkest time of protagonist Bella Swan's life. Meyer wrote the book before Twilight was published. Writing the book was difficult for Meyer as she feared the readers' reaction to the emotional pain Bella's goes through, what could be described as grief and feeling lost.

Meyer wrote New Moon in five months. She found the editing process "much longer and more difficult than the same process with Twilight." Also, unlike Twilight, which Meyer intended not to publish at first, she recognized that New Moon was going to be published and had what she described as a "horrible feeling much like stage fright" while writing. However, Meyer considers Jacob to be her favorite gift the book gave, as she liked the character a lot and wanted to expand his role and presence.

The confrontation with the Volturi in the clock tower at the end of the book was the first scene Meyer wrote. She did not want to use a real city as the location for the Volturi's residence, as she did with Forks. She decided to name her city "Volturin" and chose a location in Tuscany, Italy because it matched her vision of the city being "very old and relatively remote." However, when consulting a map, she found that there was a city called Volterra in the area where she had planned to place her imaginary city. Therefore, she chose Volterra and called it "a pretty creepy coincidence."

The first draft of New Moon differed significantly from the manuscript published. Originally, Bella never found out that Jacob was a werewolf, and as a result, the seventy pages following Bella's discovery of Jacob's nature were missing. The epilogue was also different in title and content. Meyer found it difficult to write Bella's pain over Edward's departure and often cried while writing those parts. She mentioned that she never suffered a heartbreak like Bella's, so she couldn't draw inspiration for her pain from personal experiences, but based it on how she thought she would feel if she lost a child, while insisting that it came from her character, who is "much more open—to both pain and joy." She claims that "the way she chose to cope with it" was unexpected.

According to Meyer, the story was inspired by Shakespeare's Romeo and Juliet.

== Cover and title ==
The cover art of New Moon was designed by Gail Doobinin and photographed by John Grant. Meyer has expressed on numerous occasions that she had no hand in choosing the cover, and said that she does not like it. She described it as "a very lovely ruffled tulip that means nothing at all". It could also mean love and loss with the red representing blood but keeping the innocence of the title to look fluffy and nice. Originally, Meyer suggested a clock image for the cover as she saw "time" as one of the most important themes of the novel. However, the artwork team that designed the cover chose the image of a tulip losing one of its petals, aiming to represent Bella losing a drop of blood.

When Meyer finished writing the book, she wanted a title that referred to a time of day to match Twilight. As it reflected the mood of the sequel, she titled the novel New Moon, "the darkest kind of night, a night with no moon", to refer to the darkest period of Bella's life it being the next cycle in her life of change just like the lunar phases in the moon.

== Publication and reception ==
=== Sales ===
New Moon was published by Little, Brown in the USA on September 6, 2006, with an initial print run of 100,000 copies. Demand for the book was so high that advance reading copies were being sold on eBay for as high as $380. New Moon immediately rose to the #1 position on the New York Times Best Seller list for Children's Chapter Books in its second week on the list, displacing popular children's authors such as Christopher Paolini and Markus Zusak, and remained in that spot for eleven weeks. It spent over 47 weeks in total on the list. New Moon also remained on the USA Today Best Seller list for over 150 weeks after entering the list two weeks after its release, later peaking at #1. USA Today ranked it at #29 on its 2007 top-selling books list.

By 2008, Publishers Weekly reported that New Moon had sold 1.5 million copies throughout the U.S. In October 2008, the book was ranked #37 on USA Today's "Bestselling Books of Last 15 Years". According to USA Today, the book was also the second biggest-selling book of 2008 behind its prequel, Twilight, and the biggest-selling of 2009, giving the saga the top four positions on the list for two consecutive years. It was also ranked at #27 on the list of biggest-selling books of 2010.

=== Critical reception ===
The novel received mostly positive reviews with some critics feeling that it dragged in the middle. Hillias J. Martin of School Library Journal praised the book, saying, "Less streamlined than Twilight yet just as exciting, New Moon will more than feed the bloodthirsty hankerings of fans of the first volume and leave them breathless for the third". Kirkus Reviews praised the novel, describing it as "an exciting page turner...This tale of tortured demon lovers entices." Moreover, Cindy Dobrez of Booklist gave New Moon a positive review, stating that Bella's dismay at being ordinary "will strike a chord even among girls who have no desire to be immortal, and like the vampires who watch Bella bleed with "fevered eyes," teens will relish this new adventure and hunger for more". Furthermore, Norah Piehl of Teenreads.com thought that in the middle "the story sometimes drags, and readers may long for the vampires' return", though she believed that "New Moon will leave Meyer's many fans breathless for the sequel, as Bella finally understands everything that will be at stake if she makes the ultimate choice to give up her humanity and live, like the vampires, forever." Anna Limber of About.com echoed Piehl, saying that "the middle section is a little slow" and some aspects of the story were "predictable". However, she gave the book 3.5 stars out of 5 and said that the novel as a whole "has a brooding and melancholy feel to it, capturing well the angst of its teenage characters."

Feedback from readers has been as divided as the reactions to the first installment in the series. Many readers echo what critics have to say about the novel’s pacing and character development. There has also been discussion since the novel’s publication regarding the portrayal of Native American characters in the series, who are featured prominently in the sequel. Many Quileute people feel positively about their culture being included in the book, yet other tribal members criticize the Twilight franchise for appropriating their culture and origin stories, also noting that none of the franchise’s profits made its way into Quileute hands. To date, the tribe has received no compensation for the representation of their history and culture in the books and films.

New Moon won the Senior Young Reader's Choice Award in 2009.

== Adaptations ==
A film adaptation of New Moon was released on November 20, 2009. It is the sequel to 2008's Twilight, which is based on the previous novel written by Meyer. The film starred Kristen Stewart, Robert Pattinson, and Taylor Lautner, reprising their roles as Bella Swan, Edward Cullen, and Jacob Black, respectively. In late November 2008, Summit Entertainment greenlit the sequel, which was directed by Chris Weitz with Melissa Rosenberg returning as the screenwriter. The majority of the film was shot in Vancouver, British Columbia.

New Moon was also released as a graphic novel, illustrated by Korean artist Young Kim and published by Yen Press.. Volume 1 was released on April 23, 2013. A second volume was planned, but has been indefinitely delayed as of 2015.
