= Eclipse (Meyer novel) =

Third novel in the Twilight Saga by Stephenie Meyer

- First edition cover of Eclipse
- Author: Stephenie Meyer
- Language: English
- Series: Twilight series
- Genre: Young adult, Fantasy, Romance
- Publisher: Little, Brown
- Publication date: August 7, 2007 (hardcover); February 26, 2009 (kindle); August 4, 2009 (US paperback); August 13, 2009 (paperback)
- Publication place: United States
- Media type: Print (Hardcover, Paperback) e-Book (Kindle); Audio Book (CD)
- Pages: 629
- ISBN: 978-0-316-16020-9
- OCLC: 124031725
- LC Class: PZ7.M5717515 Ec 2007
- Preceded by: New Moon
- Followed by: Breaking Dawn

Eclipse (stylized as eclipse) is the third novel in the Twilight Saga by Stephenie Meyer. It continues the story of Bella Swan and her vampire love, Edward Cullen. The novel explores Bella's compromise between her love for Edward and her friendship with shape-shifter Jacob Black, along with her dilemma of leaving her mortality behind in a terrorized atmosphere, a result of mysterious vampire attacks in Seattle.

Eclipse is preceded by New Moon and followed by Breaking Dawn. The book was released on August 7, 2007, with an initial print run of one million copies, and sold more than 150,000 copies in the first 24 hours alone. Eclipse was the fourth bestselling book of 2008, only behind Twilight, New Moon, and Breaking Dawn. A film adaptation of the novel was released on June 30, 2010.

Eclipse received generally positive reviews. Critics noted its exploration of more mature themes than those of its predecessors while praising the novel's love triangle and plotting.

== Plot summary ==
The story begins with Seattle being plagued by a string of unsolved murders, which Edward Cullen suspects is caused by a newborn vampire with an uncontrollable thirst for human blood. As Edward and Bella apply to colleges, Bella tells Edward she wants to visit her friend, Jacob Black, a Quileute Native American who, like some other tribe members, can shape shift into a wolf. Edward worries for Bella's safety, but she assures him that neither Jacob nor the wolf pack would harm her. During one visit, Jacob tells Bella that he is in love with her; he wants her to choose him over Edward. Bella tells Jacob she only considers him a friend.

Meanwhile, Alice Cullen has a vision that the vampire Victoria has returned to Forks. Victoria seeks to kill Bella to avenge the death of her mate, James. Alice takes Bella to the Cullen house for a sleepover. Bella learns about Rosalie's past that led to her eventual transformation to a vampire and why she treasures humanity. Bella is determined to become a vampire but eventually agrees to reconsider her decision. A few days later, Edward proposes to Bella. Despite harboring an aversion to marriage, Bella accepts on the condition that Edward will have sex with her while she is still human.

The Cullens soon realize that the Seattle murders are being committed by an "army" of newborn vampires controlled by Victoria. The Cullens join forces with the wolf pack to combat this threat, after their longtime allies, the Denali Coven, refuse to help them. As everyone prepares for battle, Edward, Bella, and Jacob camp in the mountains to stay hidden during the battle. Seth Clearwater, a young wolf pack member, later joins them to wait out the fight.

Jacob overhears Edward and Bella discussing their engagement. Upset, he threatens to join the fight and get himself killed. Bella stops Jacob by kissing him and realizes she also loves him. During the battle, Victoria tracks Edward's scent to Bella's hiding place. Edward fights and kills Victoria. The Cullens and their allies defeat her vampire army. Afterward, Bella tells Jacob that she loves him, but her love for Edward is greater. The book ends with Bella proceeding to tell Charlie that she intends to marry Edward.

The epilogue reveals that a heartbroken Jacob has run away in his wolf form. Leah is sympathetic, having gone through a similar heartbreak with Sam. She reveals her own disgust and hatred for Bella.

== Development, inspirations and influences ==
Meyer finished the rough draft of Eclipse before the release of Twilight in October 2005; however, she said that the final manuscript did not differ much from the rough draft. Originally, the book had a different ending when Eclipse was intended to be the final book in the series, as Meyer was signed to a three-book deal with Little, Brown and Company. Meyer stated that the events of Eclipse are centered on Bella's choice to become a vampire and fully comprehending the price she has to pay to undergo the transformation, which she didn't understand in Twilight and New Moon. She said that "every aspect of the novel revolves around this point, every back story, every relationship, every moment of action."

According to Meyer, the book was inspired and influenced by Wuthering Heights by Emily Brontë, although she does not like the book. She said that the characters of the book fascinate her and she enjoys reading certain parts but does not enjoy the book as a whole because she finds it very depressing—an opinion expressed by Edward in Eclipse. When comparing Edward and Jacob to Heathcliff and Edgar Linton of Wuthering Heights, she said, "You could look at Edward and Jacob from one perspective and say: Okay, this one is Heathcliff and this one is Edgar. And someone else might say: No, wait a second. Because of this reason and that reason, that one is Heathcliff and the other one is Edgar...I like that confusion, because that's how life is." In August 2009, The Telegraph reported that HarperCollins' Wuthering Heights edition—which has a "gothic" cover similar to the Twilight covers—has sold more than 10,000 copies since May of that year, more than twice as many as the traditional Penguin Classics edition, and topped the newspaper's classic books chart for the first time due to Meyer referencing the novel.

== Cover ==
The book jacket features a torn red ribbon. Although it was supposed to be disclosed to the public in May 2007 at the Eclipse Prom, Barnes & Noble and Meyer's official website premiered the newly released cover in March 2007, along with a preview summary of the book's plot. The broken ribbon represents choice, as in the book Bella must choose between her love for the vampire Edward Cullen and her friendship with the werewolf Jacob Black. Meyer also stated that the ribbon represents the idea that Bella is unable to completely break away from her human life. Movie tie-in covers featuring Kristen Stewart, Robert Pattinson, and Taylor Lautner who portray Bella, Edward, and Jacob, in the feature film, were released in May 2010.

== Release ==
=== Marketing campaigns ===
A few months prior to the release of Eclipse, Meyer hosted an "Eclipse Prom" event at Arizona State University with the help of a local bookstore and ASU's English department. The tickets sold out in seven hours, resulting in Meyer holding a second prom on the same day for which tickets sold out within four hours. At the event, Meyer read the first chapter of Eclipse, which was released in the special edition of New Moon that same day. In addition, Meyer embarked on a 15-city tour to promote the book. She also released the first chapter on her website and posted a "Quote of the Day" from the novel on each of the 37 days leading up to its release.

Prior to the book's release, Meyer also made an appearance on Good Morning America.

=== Early release ===
On July 25, an incident similar to the early release of the seventh Harry Potter book occurred with shipments of Eclipse. Barnes & Noble Booksellers accidentally shipped advance copies of Eclipse to some of the customers who had pre-ordered.

To prevent any spoilers from popping up online, many fansite forums for the Twilight series were shut down. Stephenie Meyer also locked her MySpace comments in an attempt to avoid spoilers. In an open letter to the fansite the Twilight Lexicon, Meyer pleaded with these "lucky readers" to keep the ending to themselves until the rest of the Twilight fans had the chance to read and enjoy Eclipse as well.

== Publication and reception ==
=== Sales ===
Eclipse was published with an initial run of one million copies and sold 150,000 copies in its first day of release. The book knocked J.K. Rowling's Harry Potter and the Deathly Hallows off the top of bestseller lists around the globe, including The New York Times Best Seller list, even though Deathly Hallows had been released only two and a half weeks earlier. Eclipse peaked at #1 on USA Today's top 150 best sellers list and went on to spend over 100 weeks on the list, and was later ranked #45 on their list of the best-selling books of the last 15 years in October 2008. Eclipse was the fourth bestselling book of 2008, only behind Twilight, New Moon, and Breaking Dawn, and the second bestselling of 2009 behind New Moon. It also ranked #1 on Publishers Weekly's list of "Bestselling Hardcover Backlist Children's Books" in 2008 with over 4.5 million copies sold.

=== Critical reception ===
Eclipse received mostly positive reviews. Anne Rouyer of School Library Journal gave the novel a positive review and said that, "Meyer knows what her fans want: thrills, chills, and a lot of romance, and she delivers on all counts." Rouyer also thought that as in the two previous installments, "it is Meyer's effective and intense portrayal of first love in all its urgency, passion, and confusion that drives the story along with the supernatural elements coming in a close second", and said that the "injection of heightened sexual tension and sensuality that hasn't been present in the series before" contributed well to the emotional atmosphere of the novel. However, she found that the werewolves' and vampires' histories slowed the book's pace and called the newborn army's story a "convoluted add-in", while noting that they "contribute in some way to Bella's epiphanies about her future." Katie Trattner of Blogcritics praised the characters and their development throughout the novel, particularly the histories of Rosalie and Jasper—contradicting Rouyer—stating, "The history that formed them and their reactions towards Bella become clear and the characters much more solid because of this knowledge. I think that is part of the appeal of these books—the fact that you do become so wrapped up in the characters, that they touch places deep inside yourself." She commended Meyer for painting a good emotional image, as well as Bella's emotional growth, and went on to say that she "writes so fluidly and propels the reader forward so effortlessly." Selby Gibson-Boyce of Tulsa World wrote, "I read without stopping until I finished. Meyer's book would not detach itself from my hand. Exactly the same thing happened with Twilight and New Moon." Publishers Weekly wrote, "The legions of readers who are hooked on the romantic struggles of Bella and the vampire Edward will ecstatically devour this third installment of the story", while noting that, "it's unlikely to win over any newcomers." Kirkus Reviews concluded its review stating that the book's "unsettling racially charged characterizations are offset by messages of overcoming difference and working together. Fans of Bella's angst-drenched love triangle will gobble this entry up, and the open-ended conclusion paves the way for Jake's story to come."

Laura Buhl of About.com gave the novel a more mixed review, giving it 3.5 stars out of 5. She found "the first several chapters stifled by issues of jealousy which are slow to develop", and said "Meyer's new sources of conflict feel heavy-handed at some points and over-the-top at others." Despite praising Meyer for uncannily understanding and writing the workings of the teenage mind, she noted that Bella is slow on the uptake of some obvious aspects of the plot. However, she went on to praise the final climactic battle for bringing plenty of thrills and excitement. Novelist Elizabeth Hand wrote a negative review of the book for The Washington Post, calling it a "disappointment" and criticizing it for "never delivering an epic werewolf-bloodsucker smackdown", as well as for Bella remaining "an insufferable bore".

The New York Times picked the book as an Editor's Choice.

== Film adaptation ==
A film adaptation of Eclipse was released on June 30, 2010. It is the third installment of the Twilight film series, following 2008's Twilight and 2009's New Moon. Summit Entertainment greenlit the film in February 2009. Since New Moon director Chris Weitz was in post-production for New Moon when Eclipse began shooting, he did not direct the third film. Instead, Eclipse was helmed by director David Slade, with Melissa Rosenberg returning as screenwriter. Filming ran between August 17 and October 29, 2009, at Vancouver Film Studios. It was the first and only Twilight film to be converted in IMAX.
