= The Oogieloves in the Big Balloon Adventure =

- Theatrical release poster
- Directed by: Matthew Diamond
- Written by: Scott Stabile
- Based on: My Bedbugs by Alex Greene and Carol Sweeney
- Produced by: Kenn Viselman; Gayle Dickie
- Starring: Toni Braxton; Cloris Leachman; Christopher Lloyd; Chazz Palminteri; Cary Elwes; Jaime Pressly
- Cinematography: Peter Klein
- Edited by: Girish Bhargava
- Music by: Joseph Alfuso; Robert Rettberg
- Production company: Kenn Viselman Presents
- Distributed by: Freestyle Releasing
- Release date: August 29, 2012
- Running time: 88 minutes
- Country: United States
- Language: English
- Budget: $20 million
- Box office: $1.1 million

The Oogieloves in the Big Balloon Adventure (also referred to as The Oogieloves) is a 2012 American interactive educational children's musical adventure fantasy comedy film loosely based on the children's television series My Bedbugs by Alex Greene and Carol Sweeney. It features the voice talents of Malerie Grady, Stephanie Renz and Misty Miller as the three Oogieloves and also stars Toni Braxton, Cloris Leachman, Christopher Lloyd, Chazz Palminteri, Cary Elwes and Jaime Pressly.

Marketed as an "interactive film", The Oogieloves encourages the viewers to sing and dance along. The film was theatrically released on August 29, 2012 by Kenn Viselman Presents and Freestyle Releasing and received mostly negative reviews from critics. It earned $1,065,907 on a budget of $20 million, making it a critical and commercial failure. The film was nominated for Worst Picture and Worst Screen Ensemble at the 33rd Golden Raspberry Awards, but lost both to The Twilight Saga: Breaking Dawn – Part 2. The film was released on DVD on February 5, 2013.

== Plot ==
The film begins with an introduction that highlights its interactive aspect and introduces the Oogieloves: Goobie, Zoozie, and Toofie. The Oogieloves wake to prepare a surprise birthday party for their living pillow Schluufy, with the aid of magical window Windy Window, vacuum cleaner J. Edgar and grumpy pet fish Ruffy. However, J. Edgar accidentally releases the five magical balloons they bought for the party, so the Oogieloves set out to retrieve them with Ruffy.

The first balloon is found at the treehouse home of Dotty Rounder, who is obsessed with circles and polka dots, and her granddaughter Jubilee, who is obsessed with squares. The second is found at the milkshake cafe of Milky Marvin, who is holding a milkshake-drinking contest to win the second balloon in which the Oogieloves and their fish participate. The third balloon is found in possession of Rosalie Rosebud, a pop singer who likes roses but is allergic to them. The fourth balloon is tied to the truck of Bobby Wobbly, a bubble-selling cowboy with an unusual walk. The last balloon is found on top of a windmill, where the Oogieloves retrieve it with the help of Lola and Lero Sombrero, who ride a giant flying sombrero.

Just before they reach home with all the balloons, the Oogieloves accidentally release them again but blow kisses to persuade them to return. They then hold the surprise party for Schluufy, who did not wake until just before their return.

== Cast ==
- Malerie Grady as the voice of Toofie
- Stephanie Renz as the voice of Zoozie
- Misty Miller as the voice of Goobie
- Toni Braxton as Rosalie Rosebud
- Cloris Leachman as Dotty Rounder
- Christopher Lloyd as Lero Sombrero
- Chazz Palminteri as Milky Marvin
- Cary Elwes as Bobby Wobbly
- Jaime Pressly as Lola Sombrero
- Maya Stange as Windy Window
- Nick Drago as J. Edgar
- Alecia Jai Fears as Rochelle Rosebud
- Kylie Dakota as Jubilee Rounder
- Taras Los as Schluufy The Pillow
- Randy Carfagno as Ruffy
- Guistina Chirco as Marna

== Production ==
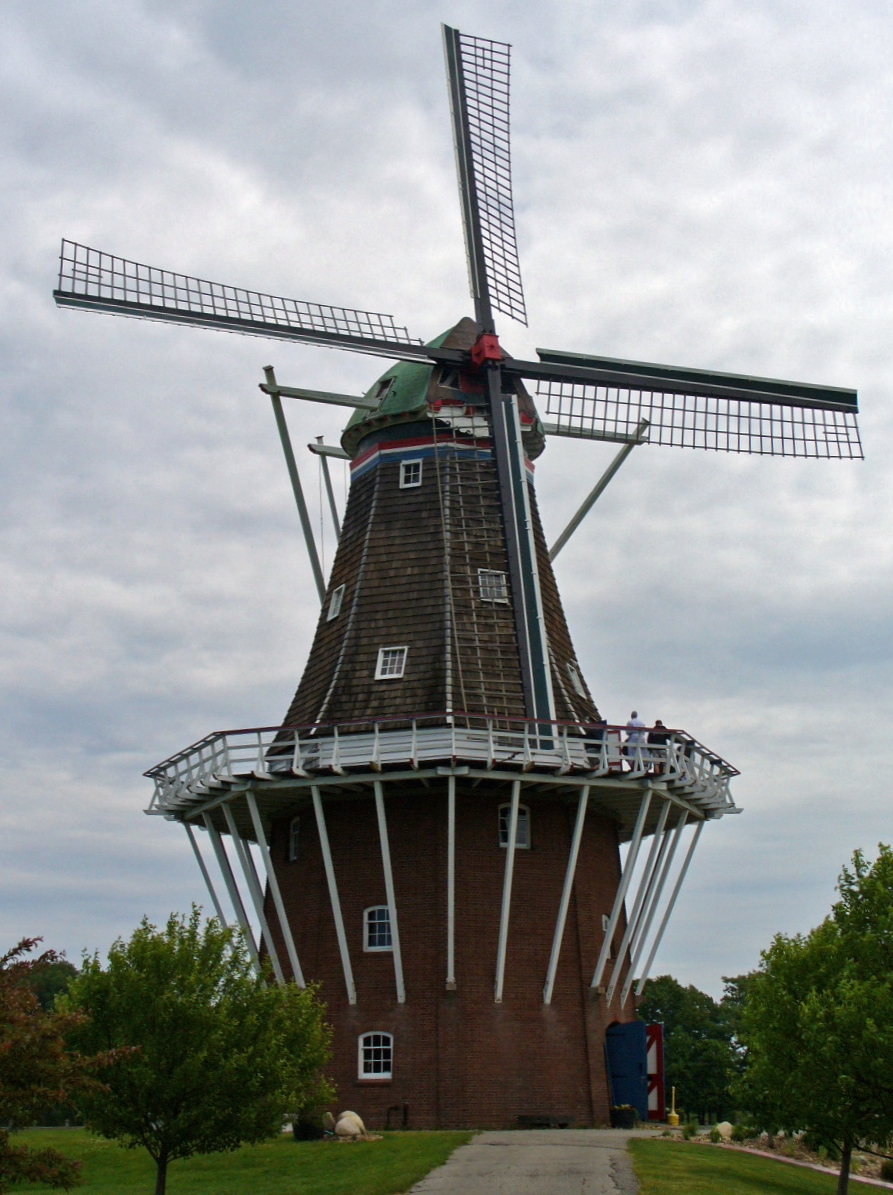
The De Zwaan windmill on Windmill Island in Holland, MI, featured in the film

The film was written by Scott Stabile and produced by Kenn Viselman, who was the producing partner of the Teletubbies in the Western Hemisphere as well as the American marketing executive for Thomas & Friends. Viselman claims that he and Teletubbies creator Anne Wood had multiple disputes with each other, because Wood refused to let Viselman pursue a film adaptation of the show. The film is loosely based on the characters from the children's TV show My Bedbugs, which aired on Detroit area PBS station WTVS. After seeing Madea Goes to Jail in a theater, where he saw how the audience members would shout out advice to the characters on screen, Viselman was partially inspired to create a children's film in the vein of Teletubbies with the interactive aspect, allowing the children to sing, dance, and respond to the characters on screen. He felt that "The idea of interactivity isn't new, but the idea of interactivity in a theater is." He also wanted to add something new to the Pixar and DreamWorks-dominated children's film market: "Why can't we have something that's all love, where we don't even have the color black? Pixar always has the triumph of good over evil. But why does there have to be evil in the first place?"

The film was shot over 4 days in 2009 in various places of Michigan, such as Canton, Farmington Hills, Shelby Township, Waterford, and Windmill Island in the city of Holland.

Being a fan of children's entertainment and having a past experience in it through an appearance on Blue's Clues, Braxton joined the project after learning that Viselman produced Thomas the Tank Engine, her son's favorite show. She did no preparation for the role, reasoning that she "just went into the little kid that I am, that we all are, some times. I just said I'm going to have fun with her." Braxton did actually have a severe cold when recording the singing voice for "Ode to Adelaide (The Scratchy Sneezy Cough Cough Song)", and the sneezes she performed were real. Due to her cold making her voice "deep" and "not-kid-friendly", it was pitch-shifted higher for the song. The 86-year-old Leachman explained that she did the movements for her song through perseverance, and that the dancing influenced her to get back into exercising after fifteen years of not doing so.

== Soundtrack ==
- The Oogieloves theme song – the Oogieloves and company
- The Wonky Wake Up song – the Oogieloves and company
- Pineapple Upsidedown Flapjacks – the Oogieloves and company
- March and Moo – Chazz Palminteri, the Oogieloves and company
- Polkadotty Shake your Body – Cloris Leachman and Kylie O'Brien
- Ode to Adelaide (Scratchy Sneezy Cough Cough) – Toni Braxton
- Wobble with your Wiggle – Cary Elwes
- Jump, Step, Clap – Christopher Lloyd and Jaime Pressly

== Release ==
Several investors, including a Michigan real estate investor named Michael Chirco, spent much of its marketing money on billboards, television ads, and bidding with mommyblogs to cover the film.

Originally scheduled for a November 2010 release, the film was ultimately released on August 29, 2012. The film had its world premiere on August 13, 2012 at the Emagine Theater in Royal Oak, Michigan. On its opening weekend, the film became one of the biggest box office bombs of all time especially for films released in at least 2,000 theaters. To alleviate the problem, the number of screens showing the film was reduced, and it would be shown in early mornings ("kind of like The Rocky Horror Picture Show, but in the morning instead of midnight", explained Viselman).

The film was released on Amazon Prime on February 5, 2013, with the DVD issued exclusively at Walmart the same day by Lionsgate Home Entertainment. On July 16, the DVD began selling at other retailers.

== Reception ==
=== Box office ===
In its debut weekend, Oogieloves proved to be one of the least successful films ever released in at least 2,000 theaters. Its production budget was $20 million, in addition to another $40 million in marketing costs. On August 29, 2012, the film opened at #17 at the box office to $102,564 in 2,160 theaters, with a per-theater average of $47. Box Office Mojo said the film needed "at least $5 million to avoid being dubbed a legendary flop, and it's not going to come anywhere close". It grossed only $445,000 in its opening weekend, surpassing another film released by Freestyle Releasing, Delgo, for the lowest opening weekend of a film in 2,000 or more theaters. Delgo also played in the same number of theaters as Oogieloves. The film has the second-worst opening weekend per-theater average for a widely released film at $206. "To put that in perspective, if each location played Oogieloves five times a day on one screen at an average ticket price of $7, that would translate to fewer than two people per showing", according to Box Office Mojo. The film's theatrical run ultimately grossed $1,065,907. Only Delgo had a worse total theatrical gross; however, The Oogieloves played for 23 days, while Delgo played for only seven.

Following the film's opening weekend, Viselman attributed the poor box office to the film's marketing, suggesting it would have been more successful if its television spots aired earlier. He was, however, appreciative of the press covering the film's poor opening weekend, suggesting it would help in marketing its home media releases and possible sequels to the film (which never materialized).

=== Critical reception ===
The film received generally negative reviews from critics. On Rotten Tomatoes, the film has a 32% "Rotten" approval rating on Rotten Tomatoes based on 22 reviews and a score of 32% on Metacritic based on 11 reviews. Rotten Tomatoes' critical consensus says, "Although it may serve as a passing diversion for very young viewers, The Oogieloves fails to offer much more than several brightly colored examples of the worst stereotypes of modern children's entertainment."

Nick Schager of Slant Magazine gave the film 0.5 stars out of 4 calling the film "brainless and insufferable" with "pitiful visuals" and "cornball" numbers that lacked any educational value. Loren King of the Boston Globe considered The Oogieloves to be a "dumbed-down mash-up of the least creative parts of Teletubbies, Barney & Friends and Pee-wee's Playhouse" which preschoolers would enjoy due to its interactivity, but would be a waste of time for parents "in a world where Sesame Street is on TV every day... even in a world where Sesame Street didn't exist." King also questioned whether the intent of the film was to set the stage for future merchandising of its characters. Mark Olsen of the Los Angeles Times criticized The Oogieloves as a "prefab construction meant to appear like a beloved set of characters" that was "ineffectual and disengaging". A. O. Scott of the New York Times reviewed the film from the perspective of the seven-year-old daughter of a family friend. She stated that she "thought it was for babies" and observed, among other things, that none of the children in the audience were paying attention to the film, and that the toddler whose family she saw it with fell asleep partway through the movie. Common Sense Media gave the film 2 stars out of 5 stating that the film could enthrall very young viewers despite it boring adults.

In a 2023 retrospective, Matt Singer of ScreenCrush called it the worst movie of 2012.

=== Accolades ===
The film was nominated for Worst Picture and Worst Screen Ensemble (as the entire cast of the film) at the 33rd Golden Raspberry Awards, but lost in both categories to The Twilight Saga: Breaking Dawn – Part 2.

== Future ==
=== Planned sequels ===
In March 2010, two years before the film's release, it was announced that a sequel entitled The Oogieloves in the BIG Family Adventure was in development with screenwriter Scott Stabile returning to write with production beginning later that year. In September 2012, Kenn Viselman that they plan to shoot this film and another sequel entitled The Oogieloves in the BIG Holiday Adventure back-to-back later that year with location scouting underway in Michigan. By early 2013, Viselman confirmed that the scripts for both films have been completed and that funding has been secured from overseas backers. As of 2026, no further announcements have been made since.
