= Tulip Time =

Tulip Time may refer to:

- Tulip Time Festival in Holland, Michigan, U.S.
- other Tulip festivals
- Tulip Time: The Rise and Fall of the Trio Lescano, a 2008 documentary film

== See also ==
- Tulip mania, a period during the Dutch Golden Age
