= A Thousand Words (film) =

2012 American film by Brian Robbins

- Theatrical release poster
- Directed by: Brian Robbins
- Written by: Steve Koren
- Produced by: Alain Chabat; Stephanie Danan; Nicolas Cage; Norman Golightly; Brian Robbins; Sharla Sumpter Bridgett
- Starring: Eddie Murphy; Kerry Washington; Cliff Curtis; Clark Duke; Allison Janney
- Cinematography: Clark Mathis
- Edited by: Ned Bastille
- Music by: John Debney
- Production companies: DreamWorks Pictures; Saturn Films; Varsity Pictures; Work After Midnight Films
- Distributed by: Paramount Pictures
- Release date: March 9, 2012
- Running time: 91 minutes
- Country: United States
- Language: English
- Budget: $40 million
- Box office: $22 million

A Thousand Words is a 2012 American fantasy comedy-drama film directed and produced by Brian Robbins, written by Steve Koren, produced by Nicolas Cage, and starring Eddie Murphy. It was produced by DreamWorks Pictures, Saturn Films, Varsity Pictures and Work After Midnight Films released in theaters by Paramount Pictures on March 9, 2012, four years after it was filmed.

Critics panned the film as formulaic and outdated, and for miscasting Murphy in a mostly silent role. It is currently one of a small number of films with a 0% rating on review aggregator Rotten Tomatoes. It was also a box office bomb, grossing just $22 million worldwide on a $40 million budget. As of 2025, it is the last film directed by Robbins, who would move on into a career as a media executive, and was Murphy's last film appearance for four years until Mr. Church (2016).

== Plot ==
Literary agent Jack McCall uses his "gift of gab" to get various book deals, and he is not afraid to stretch the truth to get them. He pushes hard to get a deal from New Age self-help guru Dr. Sinja, who sees through Jack's deceit but agrees to the deal.

That next morning, a Bodhi Tree appears in Jack's backyard, so he assumes it's a gift from Dr. Sinja. The next day, Jack discovers that Sinja has written a five-page book and goes to confront him.

After Jack mentions the bodhi tree, Dr. Sinja visits his house and they discover that for every word Jack speaks, a leaf falls off. When it runs out of leaves, it will die, as will Jack. He finds that even written words and gestured words count towards his limit; plus anything that happens to the tree also affects him. When Jack tries to cut it down with an axe, a wound appears on him. When squirrels climb the tree, it tickles him. When a gardener tries to poison it with DDT, Jack gets high on the fumes and when the gardener tries to water it, Jack starts to sweat and perspire profusely.

With Jack forced to choose his words carefully, communication becomes difficult and full of misunderstandings. These cost him two book deals, his job, his wife, Caroline, and his son, Tyler. She walks out on him when she thinks his sudden silence is due to him not loving her anymore. She doesn't believe him when he tries to explain the tree to her.

Only Jack's assistant Aaron Weisberger realizes he is telling the truth, and goes to his house to keep track of how many leaves remain. Jack tries to break the curse by being a better person, giving food to the homeless and donating some of his money to charity, but that plan fails.

An intoxicated Jack spends the night singing loudly, causing the tree to lose many of its leaves. Only when Aaron confronts him and tackles him to the ground does he stop speaking and fall asleep.

With his life falling apart and the tree running out of leaves, Jack confronts Dr. Sinja and asks how to end the curse. The guru tells him to make peace in all of his relationships. With just one branch of leaves left, Jack tries to reconcile with his wife, but she remains hesitant. He visits his mother Annie, who lives in an assisted-living center and has dementia.

Annie tells Jack, who she thinks is his late father Raymond, that she wishes Jack would stop being angry at his father for walking out on them when he was a kid. Realizing this is the relationship that needs the most mending, he visits his father's grave. Jack expends the last three leaves of the tree with the words "I forgive you".

With no leaves remaining, Jack suffers a heart attack in a storm. Aaron then calls him on his cell phone. Still alive, Jack answers his phone. Aaron tells him the tree's leaves have magically reappeared, so he can now talk freely again.

Jack writes a book about his experience, called A Thousand Words, and gets Aaron, who was promoted to Jack's old position, to make the deal. Unfortunately for him, the promotion causes him to be like Jack was, thus he gets his own smaller office Bodhi Tree (though it's implied to be a prank since no leaves are shown falling off as Aaron speaks). Jack and Caroline get back together, buying the family-friendly house she had asked for, with the bodhi tree in their front yard.

== Cast ==
- Eddie Murphy as Jack McCall
  - Eshaya Draper as Young Jack
- Kerry Washington as Caroline McCall
- Clark Duke as Aaron Wiseberger
- Cliff Curtis as Dr. Sinja
- Allison Janney as Samantha Davis
- Ruby Dee as Annie McCall (Jack's Mother)
  - Sarah Scott Davis as Young Annie
- Jack McBrayer as Starbucks coffee employee
- Steve Little as Co-worker
- John Witherspoon as Blind old man
- Kayla Blake as Emily
- Lennie Loftin as Robert Gilmore
- Alain Chabat as Christian Léger de la Touffe
- Ted Kennedy as Homeless Man
- Emanuel Ragsdale as Tyler McCall

== Production ==
A Thousand Words was filmed in August 2008 in Los Angeles, California, and was supposed to be released in 2009, but was repeatedly delayed after being caught up in the separation of DreamWorks Pictures from Paramount Pictures and Viacom. During an interview for Fred: The Movie, director Brian Robbins stated that the film would be released in 2011. Reshoots were done on the film early in 2011.

The film was then scheduled for a January 2012 release, but after Murphy was announced as the host of the 2012 Oscar ceremony (he later stepped down), the film was given a date of March 23, 2012; this was later pushed to April 20, 2012, before being pushed up to its eventual release date of March 9, 2012.

Plans for a British release date of June 8, 2012, were cancelled due to the film's failure in the United States, and the film was instead released direct-to-DVD in the United Kingdom on July 16, 2012.

== Release ==
=== Box office ===
A Thousand Words grossed $18,450,127 in North America, along with $3,594,150 in other countries, for a worldwide total of $22,044,277, against an estimated production budget of $40 million.

In the United States. The film along with John Carter and Silent House was expected to gross $5 million on its opening weekend. The film made $1.9 million on Friday and it ended up debuting at sixth with a $6.1 million on its opening weekend.

== Reception ==
On Rotten Tomatoes, A Thousand Words has an approval rating of 0% based on 57 reviews, with an average rating of 3.2/10. The site's critical consensus reads, "Dated jokes (A Thousand Words was shot in 2008) and removing Eddie Murphy's voice – his greatest comedic asset – dooms this painful mess from the start." The site also gave the film their "Moldy Tomato" award for the worst-reviewed film of 2012. On Metacritic, the film has a score of 26 out of 100, based on 18 critics, indicating "generally unfavorable" reviews. Audiences polled by CinemaScore gave the film an average grade of "B−" on an A+ to F scale.

Frank Scheck of The Hollywood Reporter calls the film another example of "how the talented performer's poor choice of material continually undercuts him". Although Scheck praises Murphy's efforts, he concludes, "The formulaic script by Steve Koren doesn't manage to exploit the absurd premise with any discernible wit or invention, and the star is left floundering." Roger Ebert of the Chicago Sun-Times gave the film one and a half out of four stars and wrote: "The poster art for A Thousand Words shows Eddie Murphy with duct tape over his mouth, which as a promotional idea ranks right up there with Fred Astaire in leg irons." Ebert was also critical of the plot because it "never explains the rules".

Justin Chang of Variety wrote: "Alas, even Murphy's largely wordless, physically adroit performance can't redeem this tortured exercise in high-concept spiritualist hokum." Andrew Pulver of The Guardian commented, "Everyone, it seems, is united by A Thousand Words' awfulness."

=== Accolades ===
A Thousand Words was nominated for three Golden Raspberry Awards, but received none of them.

33rd Golden Raspberry Awards

- Worst Picture (lost to The Twilight Saga: Breaking Dawn – Part 2)
- Worst Actor (Eddie Murphy) (lost to Adam Sandler for That's My Boy)
- Worst Screenplay (Steve Koren) (lost to David Caspe for That's My Boy)

== See also ==
- List of films with a 0% rating on Rotten Tomatoes
