= Amadou Ly =

Senegalese actor

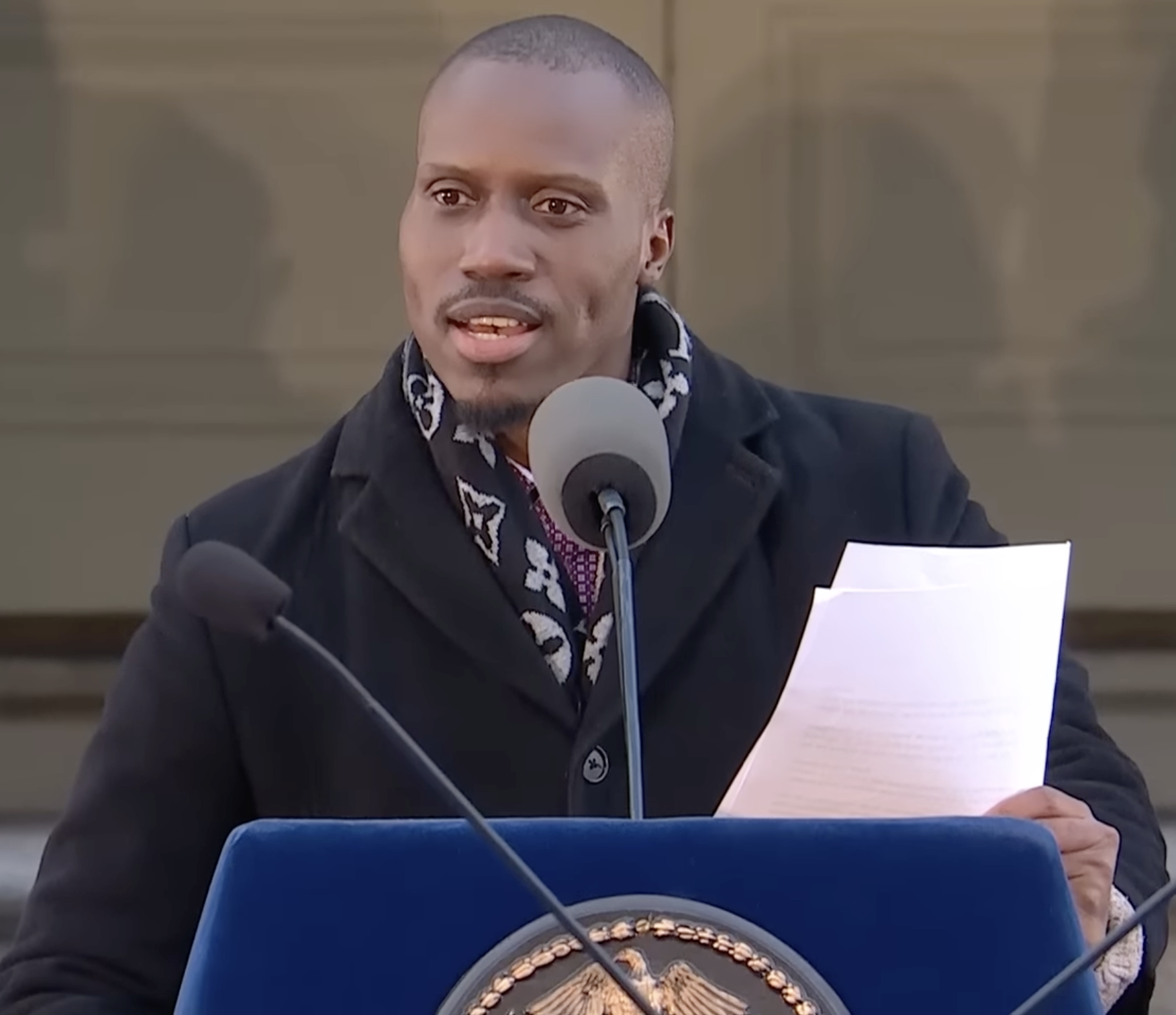
- Amadou Ly at the inauguration of Jumaane Williams
- Born: Amadou Heinz Ly; 02/02/1988; Senegal
- Citizenship: Senegal, United States
- Occupations: nonprofit executive, community advocate, immigrant-justice leader, and actor
- Organization: Amadou Ly Foundation
- Notable work: The Twilight Saga: Breaking Dawn – Part 2
- Website: www.AmadouLyFoundation.org

Amadou Ly (born Amadou Heinz Ly) is a Senegalese-American nonprofit executive, community advocate, immigrant-justice leader, and actor. He is the founder and executive director of the New York City based Amadou Ly Foundation, an organization providing legal, workforce, and social-support services to immigrants and asylum seekers in the United States.

Ly first captured national attention as a high school student when, despite facing imminent deportation, he led his East Harlem robotics team to win the New York Regional Robotics Championship. Competing against elite institutions, his team's victory became a symbol of perseverance and promise. His story, featured on the front page of The New York Times and covered by CNN, CBS, PBS, and international media, inspired extraordinary bipartisan intervention. Congressman Charles Rangel led the congressional effort on his behalf by introducing a private bill to halt his deportation, joined by President George W. Bush, Senators Hillary Clinton, Ted Kennedy, Chuck Schumer, Mayor Michael Bloomberg, and more than twenty-three Members of Congress.

In addition to his advocacy work, Ly is an actor. He appeared in The Twilight Saga: Breaking Dawn – Part 2, portraying the character Henri.

== Career ==
Ly later founded the Amadou Ly Foundation, which operates as a nonprofit immigrant support and advocacy organization without direct government funding. The foundation provides legal referrals, employment pathways, ESL instruction, healthcare enrollment assistance, food distribution, transportation support, housing navigation, and multilingual advocacy in English, Wolof, and French. The organization reports serving more than 10,000 immigrants and asylum seekers, with members across approximately 15 states.

Under Ly's leadership, the foundation has worked in coordination with municipal agencies including the New York City Mayor's Office, NYC Small Business Services, Workforce1 Career Centers, and the NYC Taxi and Limousine Commission. He has collaborated with U.S. Representative Adriano Espaillat on community "Know Your Rights" events focused on immigration law and due-process protections.

After meeting immigration detainees in Louisiana who reported food shortages and mistreatment, Ly established the "Immigrant Detainee Commissary Fund", a humanitarian initiative supporting individuals held in federal immigration detention. He also co-leads an Immigration Legal and Medical Consultation initiative in Harlem in partnership with Columbia University School of Law.

== Legal actions and detainee advocacy ==
In December 2025, the Amadou Ly Foundation gained public attention for spearheading efforts to secure the release of detained Canal Street vendors in New York City. One such case involved Abdou Tall, an immigrant detainee whom the foundation argued had been unlawfully detained. After learning of Tall's case, ALF filed a federal habeas corpus petition challenging the legality of his arrest. On December 24, Judge Arun Subramanian, a federal judge ruled in favor of the petition and ordered Tall's release.

== Public appearances and testimony ==
On December 8, 2024, Ly testified before the New York City Council, where he addressed what he described as a lack of institutional support for African immigrant communities. During his testimony, he advocated in favor of "Intro. 431", legislation related to immigrant services and protections. During the hearing, Alexa Avilés, Chair of the City Council's Immigration Committee, publicly acknowledged Ly's work, stating, "Your work gives me great hope... I just want to personally thank you for doing the work."

On Thursday, January 1, 2025, Ly appeared at the inauguration ceremony of the New York City mayor, where he delivered remarks while introducing Jumaane Williams prior to Williams's swearing-in. According to CNN, his introduction received a strong response from members of the public in attendance.

== Legacy and views ==
Ly has stated that his early experiences as an immigrant facing deportation shaped his commitment to public service and immigrant advocacy. His work focuses on expanding access to legal representation, developing workforce pathways that recognize immigrants' existing skills, and reforming minor-offense penalties that disproportionately affect immigrant communities.

== Acting ==
In addition to his advocacy work, Ly is an actor. He appeared in The Twilight Saga: Breaking Dawn – Part 2 (2012), portraying the character Henri.

== Recognition ==
Ly received the Immigrant Youth Achievement Award from the American Immigration Council after being recommended by Congressman Jim Clyburn.

== Personal life ==
On 27 August 2014, Ly became a U.S. citizen, reciting the Oath of Allegiance at a judicial naturalization ceremony in Los Angeles. Residing in Los Angeles, he is still acting.

== Filmography ==
- The Twilight Saga: Breaking Dawn – Part 2 ....Henri (2012)
- The Tested ....James Luke (2010)
- L'embrasement .... (2007)
