= Holland (film) =

2025 film by Mimi Cave

- Release poster
- Directed by: Mimi Cave
- Written by: Andrew Sodroski
- Produced by: Kate Churchill; Peter Dealbert; Nicole Kidman; Per Saari
- Starring: Nicole Kidman; Matthew Macfadyen; Gael García Bernal
- Cinematography: Pawel Pogorzelski
- Edited by: Martin Pensa
- Music by: Alex Somers
- Production companies: Amazon MGM Studios; Blossom Films; Big Indie Pictures; 42
- Distributed by: Amazon Prime Video
- Release dates: March 9, 2025 (SXSW); March 27, 2025 (United States)
- Running time: 108 minutes
- Country: United States
- Language: English

Holland is a 2025 American psychological thriller film directed by Mimi Cave, written by Andrew Sodroski and starring Nicole Kidman, Matthew Macfadyen, and Gael García Bernal. The story follows a woman (Kidman) who thought she had the perfect family life, but things change after she sets out to find out if her husband (Macfadyen) is cheating on her, leading to unexpected consequences.

The film premiered at the South by Southwest Festival on March 9, 2025, and was released on Amazon Prime Video on March 27, 2025. It received mixed-to-negative reviews from critics.

== Plot ==
In 2000, Nancy, a teacher in the small Midwestern town of Holland, Michigan, lives a stereotypical middle-class existence with her husband Fred, an optometrist, and 13-year-old son Harry. Due to frequent absences, Nancy suspects Fred of living a double life. She notes Fred keeps Polaroid photos when they do not own a Polaroid camera, and he has been going to more out-of-town conferences than would be expected for an optometrist.

Dave, a fellow teacher, helps Nancy discover what Fred has been doing when he is supposedly attending these conferences. Romantic feelings develop between Nancy and Dave. Nancy later realizes the train model Fred has been building in their home depicts details of several past murders of women. Trying to find evidence of Fred's infidelity, Dave follows Fred to a lake home, discovering that Fred is a serial killer. He stabs Fred, thinking he has killed him. Dave falsely tells Nancy he merely confronted Fred, who decided to abandon his family. Fred returns to town during the tulip festival. Nancy and Harry hide at a motel where Dave finally discloses the truth about his encounter with Fred. Dave tries to call the police over Nancy’s objection and is injured in their scuffle. Nancy finds Harry outside the motel with Fred, who chides Nancy but wants the family to return to their status quo. While in the family car, Nancy creates a distraction by commenting that Harry's seat belt is not fastened and asks Fred to stop the vehicle. Harry escapes from the car, and Nancy kills Fred in the ensuing scuffle.

== Cast ==
- Nicole Kidman as Nancy "Nance" Vandergroot, Fred's teacher wife and Harry's mother
- Gael García Bernal as Dave Delgado, a shop teacher who befriends Nancy
- Matthew Macfadyen as Fred Vandergroot, Nancy's optometrist husband and Harry's father
- Jude Hill as Harry Vandergroot, Nancy and Fred's son
- Jeff Pope as Squiggs Graumann
- Isaac Krasner as Shawn Graumann, Squiggs's son
- Lennon Parham as Gwen, Nancy's friend
- Rachel Sennott as Candy Deboer, Harry's nanny
- Jacob Moran as Matt, Gwen's son
- Chris Witaske as a Holland cop

== Production ==
=== Development ===
In 2013, Naomi Watts and Bryan Cranston were attached to star. Errol Morris was originally announced as the director. Le Grisbi Productions' John Lesher and Adam Kassan were reported as producers while Sean Murphy would be co-producer. Production was expected to start in April. The plans were abandoned by 2015, allowing Amazon Studios to secure the film rights in 2016, ultimately leading to its production with a new cast and crew in 2022.

It was announced in June 2022 that Kidman would star in and produce the project with Per Saari for Blossom Films and Peter Dealbert for Pacific View Management & Productions. Mimi Cave was onboard as director for Amazon Studios with a script by Andrew Sodroski which had topped the 2013 Blacklist survey of the "most liked" as yet unfilmed screenplays. It was later reported that Kate Churchill of Churchill Films would be the producer, rather than the previously mentioned executive producer.

Although the film was initially announced as Holland, Michigan, the title was changed to Holland when the film's release was revealed. Although the script was originally written in 2013 and set in the present day, Cave shifted the timeline to 2000. She felt that themes like Dave's alienation resonated more strongly with that era. Additionally, Cave personally connected to the early 2000s, having left the Midwest around 2002, adding authenticity and relatability to the story.

=== Casting ===
On February 1, 2023, Gael Garcia Bernal was confirmed as added to the cast. On February 6, Matthew Macfadyen was added to the cast, and a few days later so too was child actor Jude Hill. On February 16, 2023, Rachel Sennott, Lennon Parham, Isaac Krasner and Jeff Pope were added to the cast.

=== Filming ===
As well as filming in Holland, Michigan, including at the Windmill Island Gardens, principal photography also took place in Nashville and Clarksville, Tennessee, with Sennott having to travel from Tennessee to SXSW in Austin, Texas, for premieres of her next releases, in March 2023.

Principal photography took place from early March to May 7, 2023.

== Release ==
Holland premiered at the 32nd South by Southwest (SXSW) Conference and Festivals on March 9, 2025. It was released on Amazon Prime Video on March 27, 2025.

== Reception ==
=== Critical response ===
On the review aggregator website Rotten Tomatoes, 21% of 92 critics' reviews are positive, with an average rating of 4.5/10. The website's consensus reads: "Overloaded with quirk and recycled twists, Holland's impressive style can't paper over a hollow script." Metacritic, which uses a weighted average, assigned the film a score of 42 out of 100, based on 20 critics, indicating "mixed or average" reviews.

Peter Debruge of Variety described Holland as a film that immerses viewers primarily in its protagonist's perspective, which, while not entirely believable, offers an entertaining experience for audiences who enjoy the tension of questioning whether the character is unstable or the sole voice of reason. Chase Hutchinson of The Wrap praised Kidman's performance by noting that she is one of the most versatile and daring performers in modern cinema, often underappreciated despite her immense talent.

Glenn Garner of Deadline Hollywood praised the cast's performance. He said Kidman delivers a sharp, manic performance in the film, evoking the darkly comedic tone of Gus Van Sant's To Die For, complete with biting humor and a gripping mystery in a portrayal that, he said, reminds audiences why she has remained a captivating force in cinema for decades. William Hosie of London Evening Standard admired the cast's performance, especially Kidman, saying this role not only showcases Kidman's remarkable range but also reaffirms her ability to breathe life into uniquely compelling characters, further solidifying her status as one of the most versatile actresses of her generation.

Lovia Gyarkye of The Hollywood Reporter said that the true standout of Holland is Cave's distinctive style, which masterfully crafts an unsettling vision of suburban discomfort. In a similar view, Adrian Horton of The Guardian said that while Holland excels in its striking visuals and the eerie, unsettling atmosphere crafted by Cave, there's a noticeable disconnect between these strengths and the film's narrative, which feels as fragile and insubstantial as one of Nancy's delicate Dutch hats.

=== Viewership ===
On March 29, 2025, the film ranked first in Amazon Prime Video's most-watched filmlist worldwide.
