= Windmill Island =

Island in Michigan, United States of America

Windmill Island Gardens
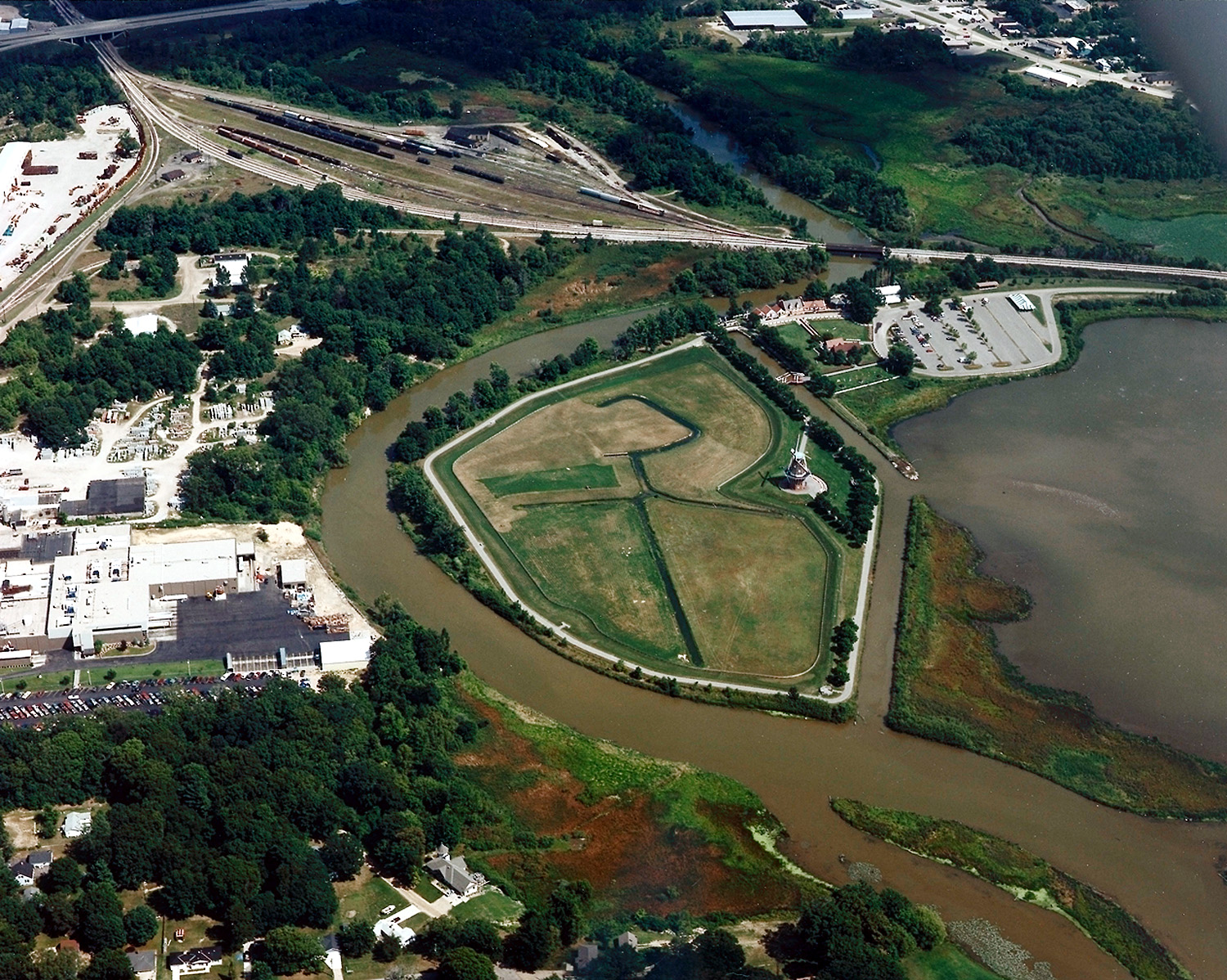
- Aerial view of Windmill Island Gardens

- Location within Michigan

Geography
- Location: Lake Macatawa
- Coordinates: 42°47′58″N 86°05′45″W
- Area: 36 acres (15 ha)

Administration
- United States
- State: Michigan
- County: Ottawa County
- City: Holland

Demographics
- Population: Uninhabited

Windmill Island Gardens is a municipal park located in the city of Holland, Michigan. It is home to the 251-year-old windmill De Zwaan, the only authentic, working Dutch windmill in the United States.

== History ==
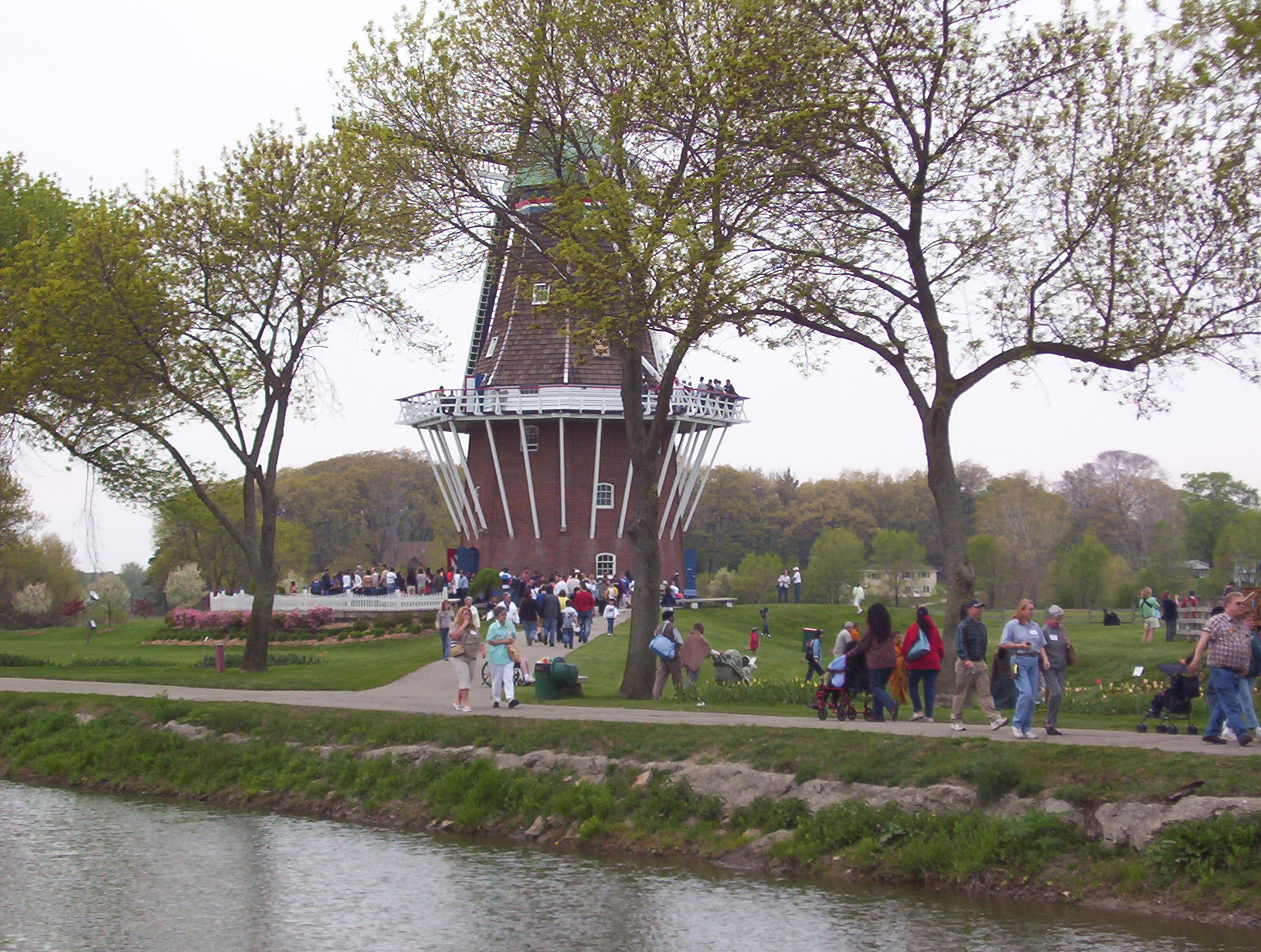
Windmill Island during Tulip Time 2005.

In 1964, the City of Holland purchased the windmill De Zwaan from a retired miller in the town of Vinkel in the province of North Brabant, the Netherlands. The windmill was shipped from the Netherlands to the port of Muskegon, Michigan on the ship Prins Willem van Oranje. It was brought by truck from Muskegon to its present location on Windmill Island. Reconstruction of the mill began in 1964 and the park opened in April 1965. The island, formerly farmed by Henry F. Koop, was chosen because of the favorable wind conditions there. Although originally a peninsula, a manmade canal turned the land into an artificial island. Before the arrival of De Zwaan, it was known as Hyma Island.

On April 10, 1965, Prince Bernhard of the Netherlands became the first visitor to the park and presided over the grand opening. His ticket and the ten guilder bill he used to purchase it are still on display in the park today.

== Windmill Island Gardens today ==
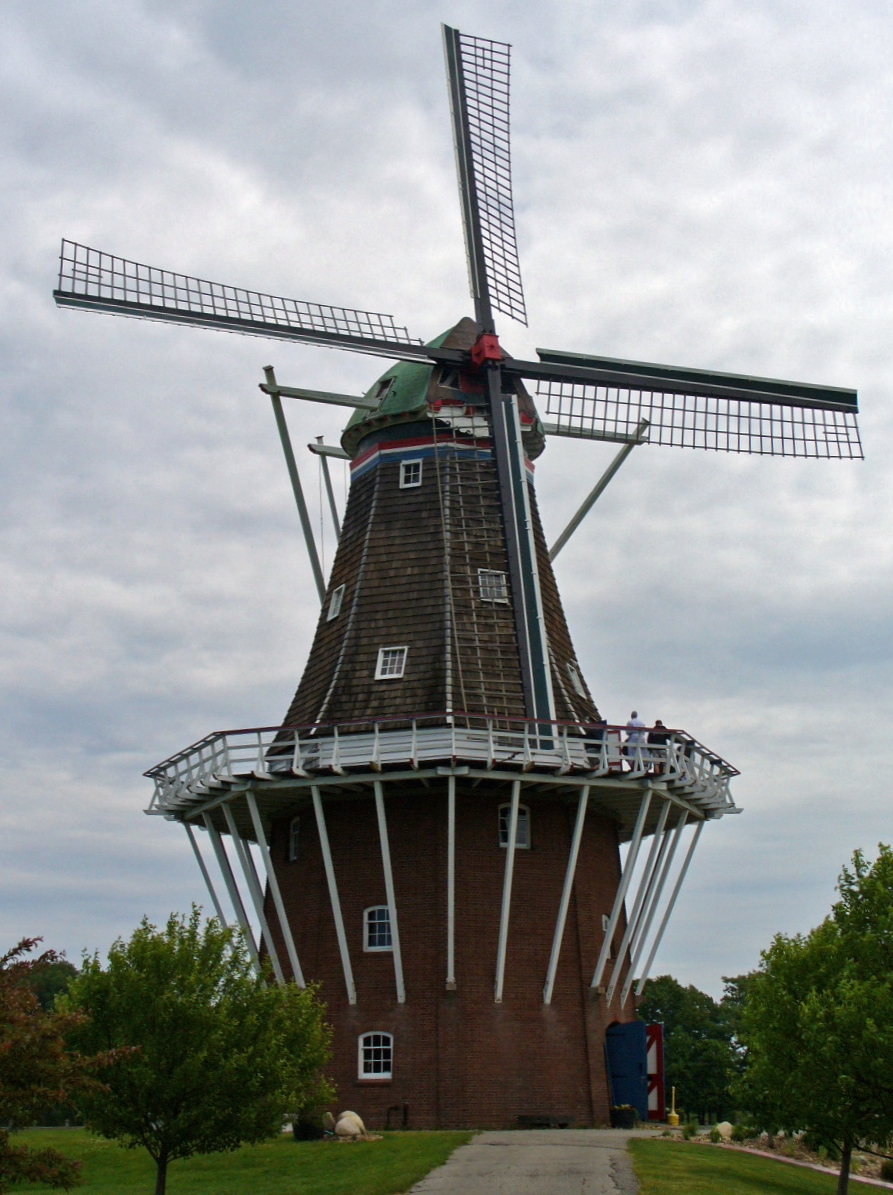
De Zwaan windmill

The park includes approximately 36 acres (15 ha) of land along the Macatawa River and the swamp leading into Lake Macatawa.

Each year Windmill Island Gardens hosts approximately 55,000 tourists. The park is open daily from late April until early October, with the most visitors in early May during the Tulip Time Festival. Over 100,000 tulips are planted on the island each year in beautiful gardens filled with flowers summer through autumn. In addition to the windmill, the park includes replicas of several historic buildings in the Netherlands. In the summer months, visitors may also see the klompen dance, traditionally performed by local high school students during the annual Tulip Time Festival.

After Tulip Time season, tourists continue to enjoy the Island's attractions, and the park frequently hosts weddings and events. The Island's celebration pavilion can seat up to 300 people. Wedding ceremonies are typically held outside the park or in the Island's gardens, with receptions and banquets taking place in the pavilion.

The Mimi Cave thriller film Holland starring Nicole Kidman, Gael García Bernal, and Matthew Macfadyen, which was released on March 27, 2025, was filmed in Holland, Michigan, the same town in which the film takes place, at Windmill Island Gardens, specifically scenes including the windmill as well as being filmed in Nashville and Clarksville, Tennessee during the spring of 2023.

The film The Oogieloves in the Big Balloon Adventure was also shot in part on the island and features the De Zwaan windmill prominently.
