= 33rd Golden Raspberry Awards =

Award ceremony presented by the Golden Raspberry Award Foundation in 2012

- Date: February 23, 2013
- Site: Magicopolis, Santa Monica, California

Highlights
- Worst Picture: The Twilight Saga: Breaking Dawn – Part 2
- Most awards: The Twilight Saga: Breaking Dawn – Part 2 (7)
- Most nominations: The Twilight Saga: Breaking Dawn – Part 2 (11)

The 33rd Golden Raspberry Awards, or Razzies, was a parodic award ceremony that identified the worst films the film industry had to offer in 2012, according to votes from members of the Golden Raspberry Foundation. Razzies co-founder John J. B. Wilson has stated that the intent of the awards is "to be annoying and agenda-driven." Nominations were revealed on January 8, 2013. Unlike the previous year, when the winners were announced on April Fools' Day, the winners were announced on February 23, one day before the Academy Awards ceremony, reverting to Razzie tradition. The nominees of worst remake/sequel were selected by the general public via Rotten Tomatoes.

== Winners and nominees ==
Winner (in bold)

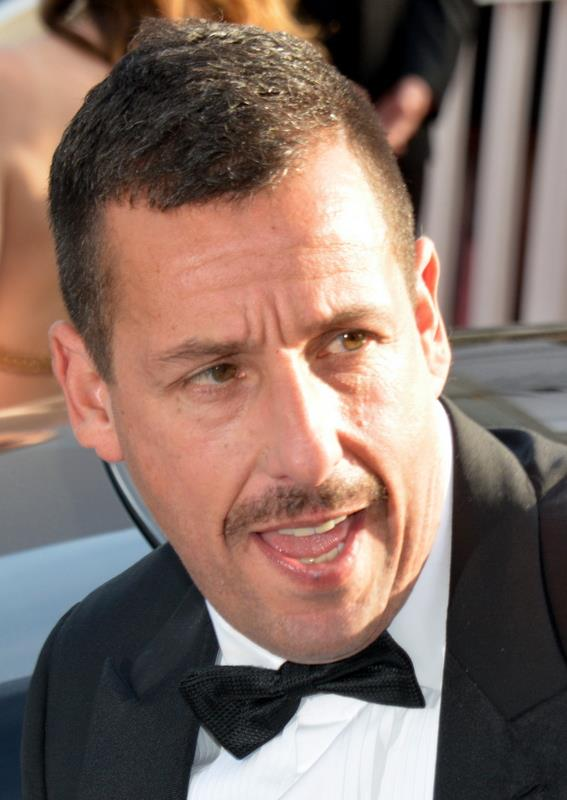
Adam Sandler, Worst Actor winner

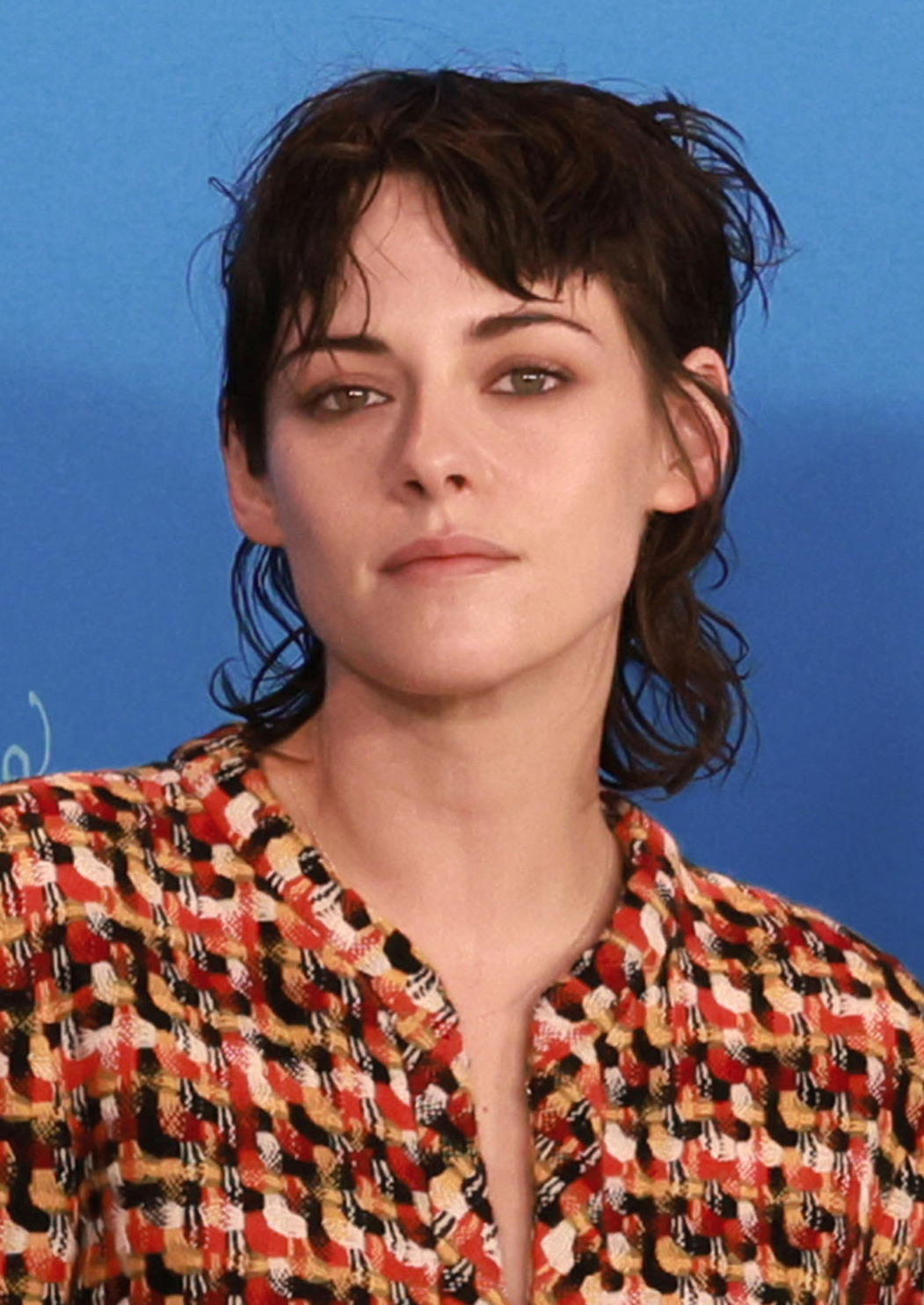
Kristen Stewart, Worst Actress winner

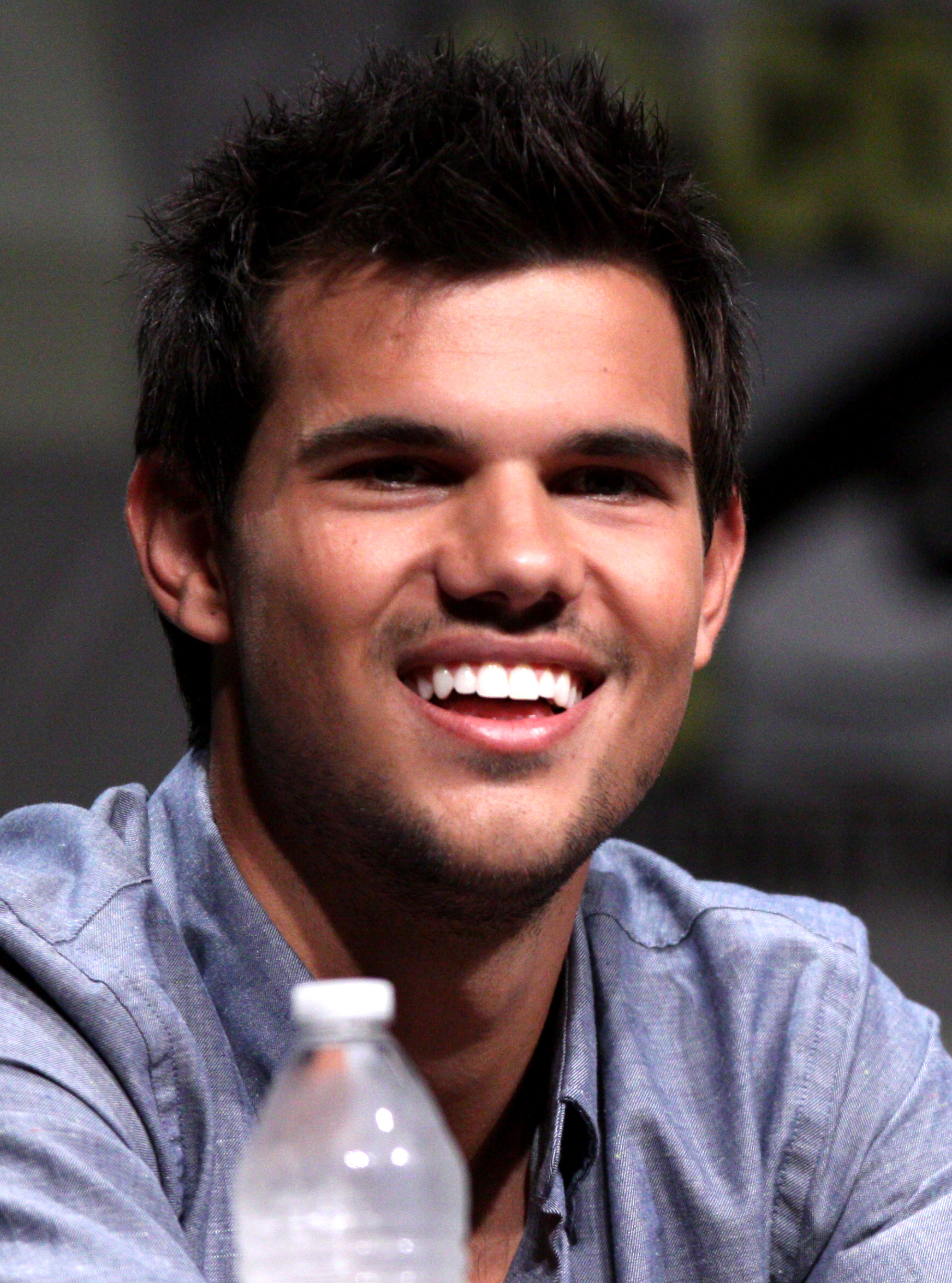
Taylor Lautner, Worst Supporting Actor winner and Worst Screen Couple co-winner

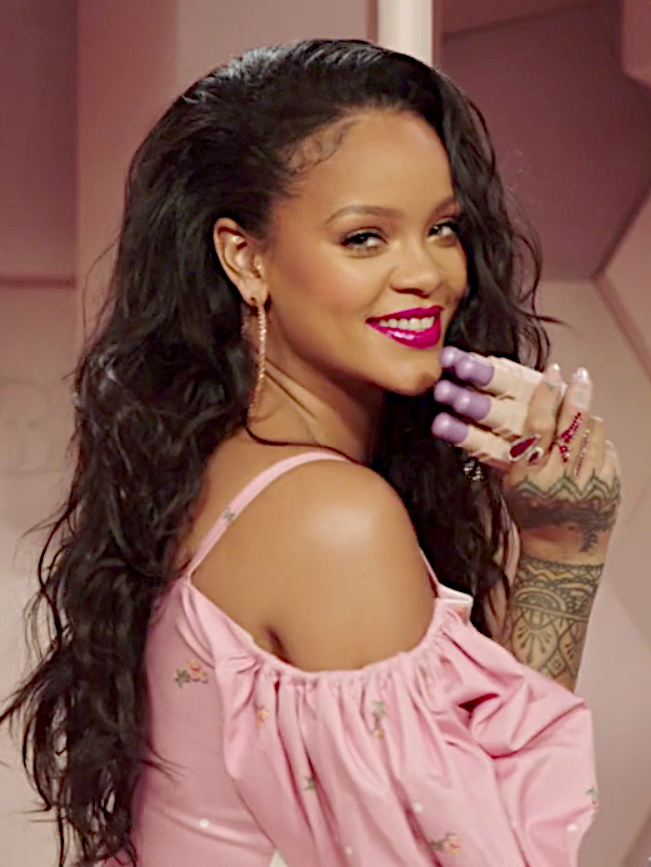
Rihanna, Worst Supporting Actress winner

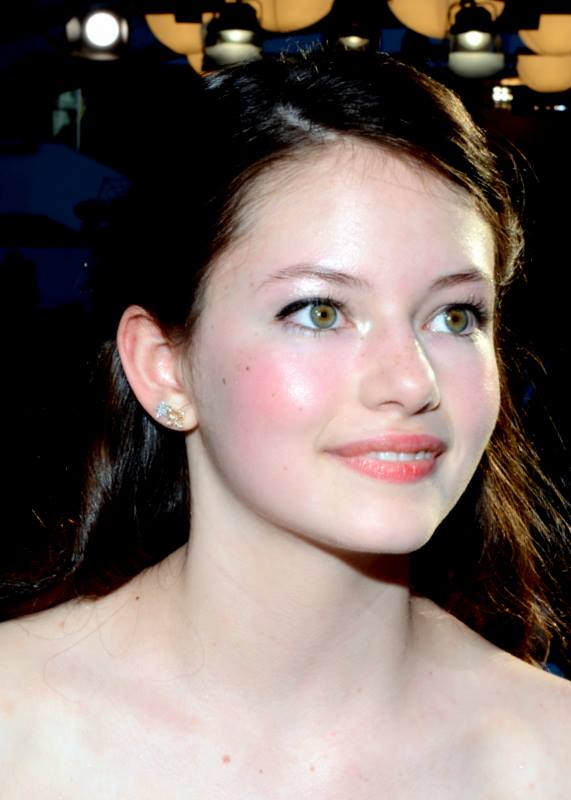
Mackenzie Foy, Worst Screen Couple co-winner

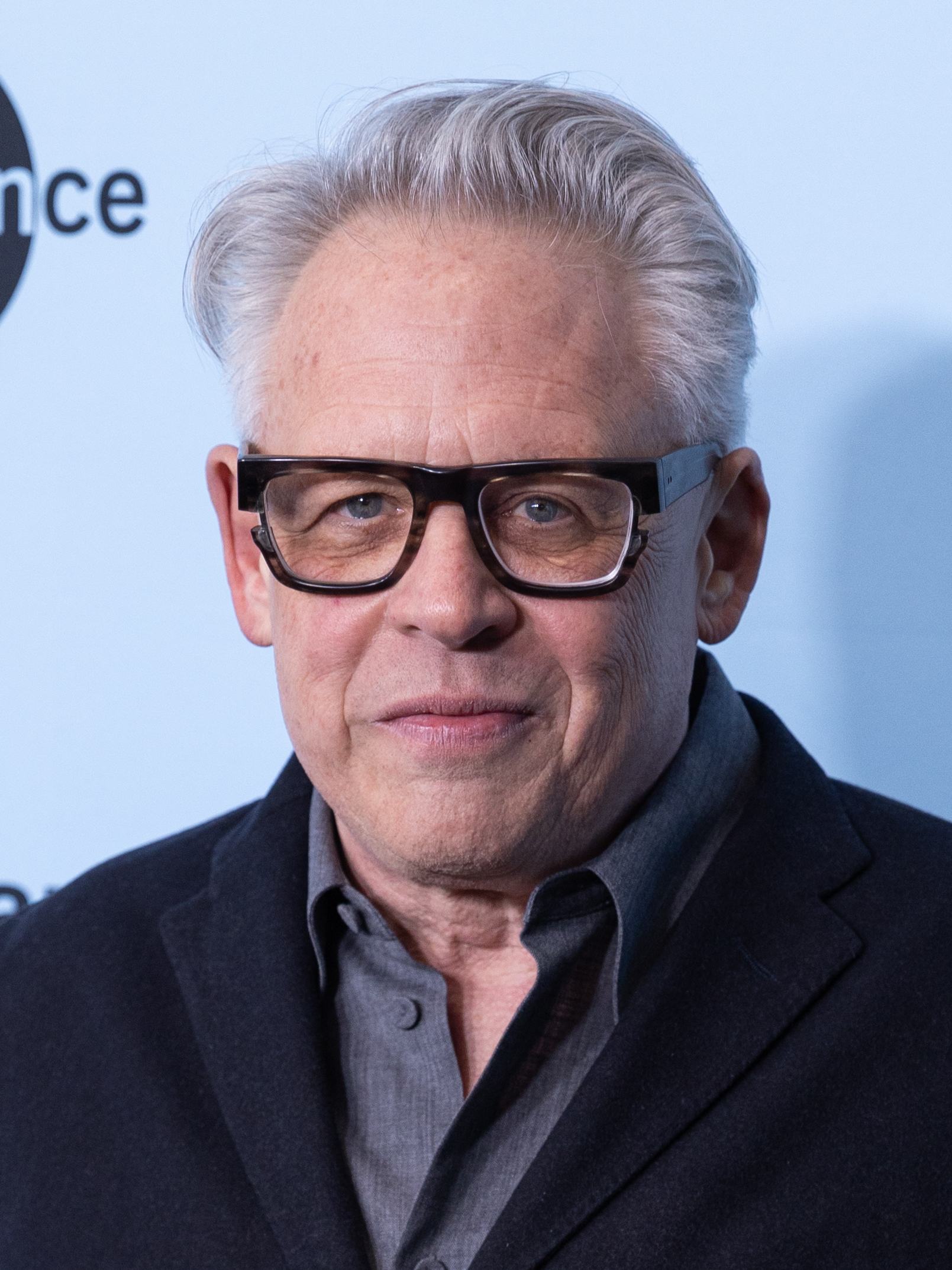
Bill Condon, Worst Director winner

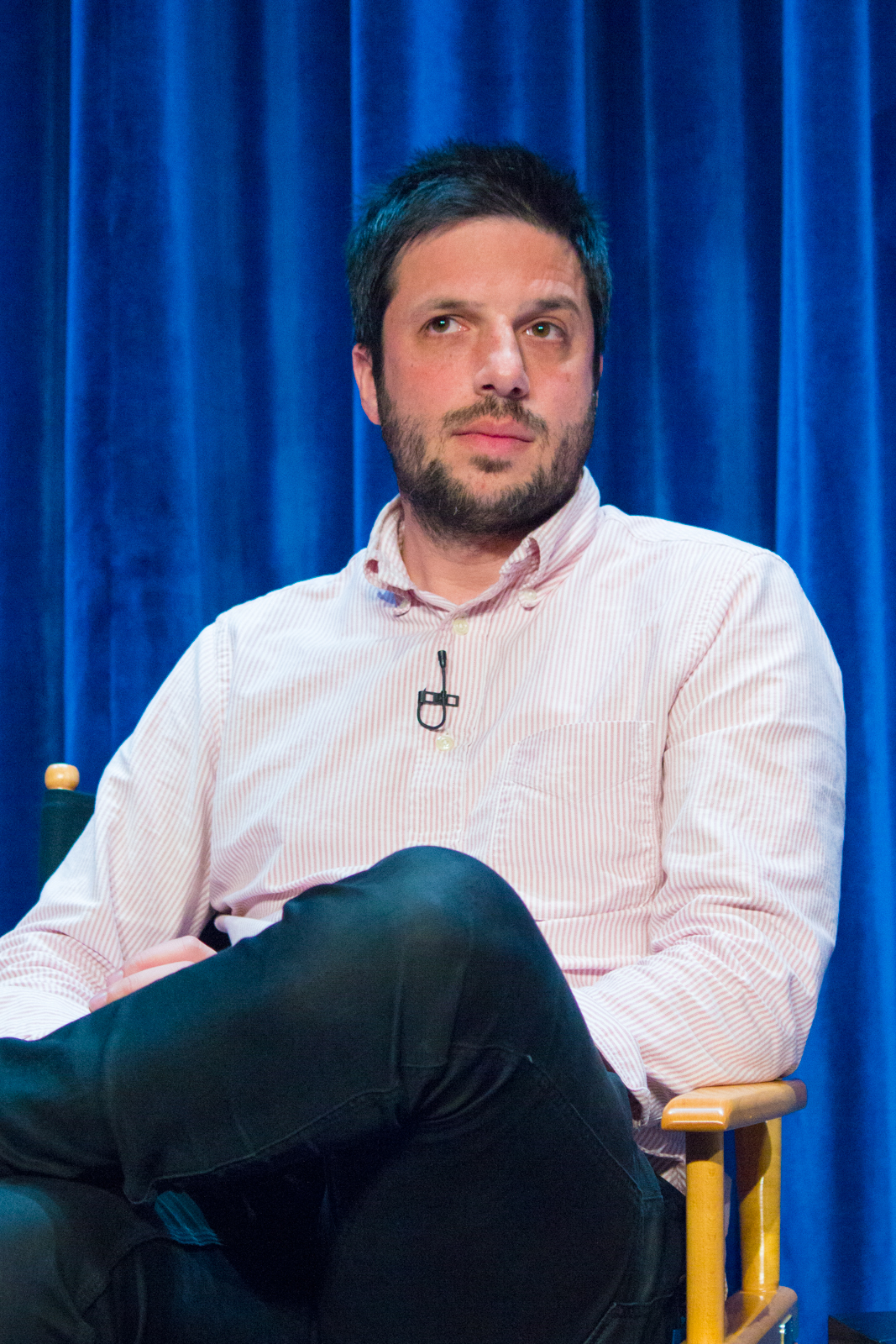
David Caspe, Worst Screenplay winner

Category	Recipient
Worst Picture	**The Twilight Saga: Breaking Dawn – Part 2 (Summit)**
Worst Picture	Battleship (Universal)
Worst Picture	The Oogieloves in the Big Balloon Adventure (Freestyle Releasing/Kenn Viselman Presents)
Worst Picture	That's My Boy (Columbia)
Worst Picture	A Thousand Words (Paramount / DreamWorks)
Worst Actor	**Adam Sandler in That's My Boy as Donny Berger**
Worst Actor	Nicolas Cage in Ghost Rider: Spirit of Vengeance and Seeking Justice as Johnny Blaze / Ghost Rider and Will Gerard (respectively)
Worst Actor	Eddie Murphy in A Thousand Words as Jack McCall
Worst Actor	Robert Pattinson in The Twilight Saga: Breaking Dawn – Part 2 as Edward Cullen
Worst Actor	Tyler Perry in Alex Cross and Good Deeds as Alex Cross and Wesley Deeds (respectively)
Worst Actress	**Kristen Stewart in Snow White and the Huntsman and The Twilight Saga: Breaking Dawn – Part 2 as Snow White and Bella Swan** (respectively)
Worst Actress	Katherine Heigl in One for the Money as Stephanie Plum
Worst Actress	Milla Jovovich in Resident Evil: Retribution as Alice
Worst Actress	Tyler Perry in Madea's Witness Protection as Madea
Worst Actress	Barbra Streisand in The Guilt Trip as Joyce Brewster
Worst Supporting Actor	**Taylor Lautner in The Twilight Saga: Breaking Dawn – Part 2 as Jacob Black**
Worst Supporting Actor	David Hasselhoff (as himself) in Piranha 3DD
Worst Supporting Actor	Liam Neeson in Battleship and Wrath of the Titans as Admiral Terrence Shane and Zeus (respectively)
Worst Supporting Actor	Nick Swardson in That's My Boy as Kenny
Worst Supporting Actor	Vanilla Ice (as himself) in That's My Boy
Worst Supporting Actress	**Rihanna in Battleship as Cora Raikes**
Worst Supporting Actress	Jessica Biel in Playing for Keeps and Total Recall as Stacie Dryer and Melina (respectively)
Worst Supporting Actress	Brooklyn Decker in Battleship and What to Expect When You're Expecting as Samantha Shane and Skyler Cooper (respectively)
Worst Supporting Actress	Ashley Greene in The Twilight Saga: Breaking Dawn – Part 2 as Alice Cullen
Worst Supporting Actress	Jennifer Lopez in What to Expect When You're Expecting as Holly
Worst Screen Couple	**Mackenzie Foy and Taylor Lautner in The Twilight Saga: Breaking Dawn – Part 2**
Worst Screen Couple	Any two cast members from Jersey Shore in The Three Stooges
Worst Screen Couple	Robert Pattinson and Kristen Stewart in The Twilight Saga: Breaking Dawn – Part 2
Worst Screen Couple	Tyler Perry and his drag get-up in Madea's Witness Protection
Worst Screen Couple	Adam Sandler and either Leighton Meester, Andy Samberg or Susan Sarandon in That's My Boy
Worst Remake, Rip-off or Sequel	**The Twilight Saga: Breaking Dawn – Part 2 (Summit)**
Worst Remake, Rip-off or Sequel	Ghost Rider: Spirit of Vengeance (Columbia)
Worst Remake, Rip-off or Sequel	Madea's Witness Protection (Lionsgate)
Worst Remake, Rip-off or Sequel	Piranha 3DD (Dimension)
Worst Remake, Rip-off or Sequel	Red Dawn (FilmDistrict)
Worst Director	**Bill Condon for The Twilight Saga: Breaking Dawn – Part 2**
Worst Director	Sean Anders for That's My Boy
Worst Director	Peter Berg for Battleship
Worst Director	Tyler Perry for Good Deeds and Madea's Witness Protection
Worst Director	John Putch for Atlas Shrugged: Part II
Worst Screenplay	**That's My Boy (written by David Caspe)**
Worst Screenplay	Atlas Shrugged: Part II (screenplay by Duke Sandefur, Brian Patrick O'Toole, & Duncan Scott, based on the novel by Ayn Rand)
Worst Screenplay	Battleship (written by Jon Hoeber and Erich Hoeber, based on the boardgame by Hasbro)
Worst Screenplay	A Thousand Words (written by Steve Koren)
Worst Screenplay	The Twilight Saga: Breaking Dawn – Part 2 (screenplay by Melissa Rosenberg, based on the novel by Stephenie Meyer)
Worst Screen Ensemble	**The entire cast of The Twilight Saga: Breaking Dawn – Part 2**
Worst Screen Ensemble	The entire cast of Battleship
Worst Screen Ensemble	The entire cast of Madea's Witness Protection
Worst Screen Ensemble	The entire cast of The Oogieloves in the Big Balloon Adventure
Worst Screen Ensemble	The entire cast of That's My Boy

== Films with multiple nominations ==
The following films received multiple nominations:

Nominations	Film
11	The Twilight Saga: Breaking Dawn – Part 2
8	That's My Boy
7	Battleship
5	Madea's Witness Protection
3	A Thousand Words
2	Atlas Shrugged: Part II
2	Ghost Rider: Spirit of Vengeance
2	Good Deeds
2	The Oogieloves in the Big Balloon Adventure
2	Piranha 3DD
2	What to Expect When You're Expecting
