= My Bedbugs =

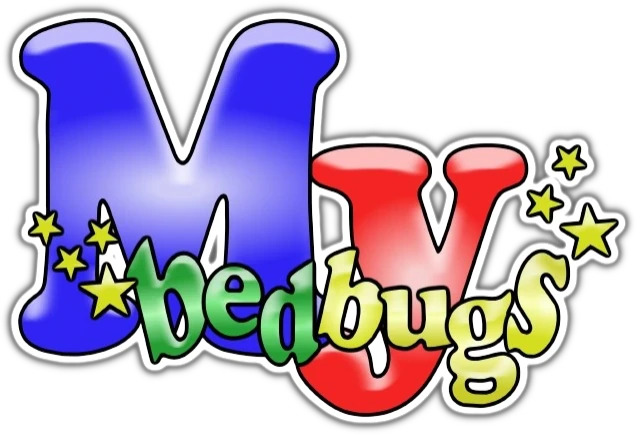
- Created by: Alex J. Greene
- Developed by: Alex J. Greene Carol Sweeney Carol Bartholomew
- Directed by: Curt Massof Brian Ochab Russell Tyrell
- Creative director: Chris Nierhaus
- Starring: Gooby, Toofy, Woozy. Snoozy, J. Edgar and Ruffy
- Opening theme: "Bedbug Party"
- Ending theme: "See You Tomorrow"
- Composer: Furman L. Jones Rusty Arnold
- Country of origin: United States
- Original language: English
- No. of seasons: 2
- No. of episodes: 47

Production
- Executive producer: Alex Greene
- Producer: Peter Tocco
- Running time: 27 minutes
- Production company: Greenestuff Inc.

Original release
- Network: WTVS/Detroit; Public television syndication American Public Television
- Release: June 6, 2004 – August 30, 2008

My Bedbugs is an American musical comedy children's television series created by Alex Greene and produced by GreeneStuff Inc. Production for the series began in October 2003 and made its premiere on WTVS on June 6, 2004 and was later distributed nationally by APT (American Public Television.)

Following the Federal Communications Commission (FCC) implementation of new rules regarding children's educational and informational programming obligations for digital television (DTV) broadcasters. GreeneStuff strategically distributed My Bedbugs to 71% of digital stations throughout the United States.

The producers signed distribution deals with Sky Angel in March 2007, Trinity Broadcasting Network in May 2007, and LATV in June 2007. These deals expanded their coverage to over 100 million homes across the United States and Canada. With the addition of TBN and several international distributors, the series was made available in more than 30 countries.

Another milestone was achieved in May 2007 when the show secured a deal with TVN, the largest independent Video-on-Demand provider. This agreement made "My Bedbugs" available on cable networks such as AT&T, Comcast, Cox, WOW, and TiVo. In Detroit, "My Bedbugs" became a favorite, ranking as the second most viewed/downloaded VOD children's program. However, due to economic downturns, the program ended on August 30, 2008.

The 2012 film The Oogieloves in the Big Balloon Adventure is loosely based on the series.

== Cast ==
=== Voices ===
- Henry Birdseye as J. Edgar
- Lee D. as Gooby
- Eve Gregson as Toofy
- Tonia Sharpe as Woozy
- Maryann Sweeney as Ruffy
- Chris Nierhaus as Snoozy

=== Character actors ===
- Lee D. (voice actor) and Scott Lauzon (costume performer) as Gooby
- Eve Gregson (voice actor) and Frank Bautista (costume performer) as Toofy
- Tonia Sharpe (voice actor) and Jaclyn Wells (costume performer) as Woozy

== Episodes ==
=== Series overview ===
Season	Episodes	Originally released	
Season	Episodes	First released	Last released
1	28	October 8, 2003	June 20, 2005
2	19	September 12, 2005	June 1, 2008

=== Season 1 (2004) ===
No. overall	No. in season	Title	Original release date
1	1	"Lost Sock Adventure"	August 1, 2004
The Bedbugs turn cleaning their room into an adventure of discovery.
2	2	"Gooby Loses a Tooth"	July 2, 2004
When Gooby's tooth finally falls out, the Bedbugs all imagine what the Tooth Fairy looks like.
3	3	"Happy Halloween"	October 31, 2007
Ghosts, goblins, and witches join the Bedbugs as they celebrate Halloween with a silly adventure.
4	4	"J. Edgar Goes to the Doctor"	August 4, 2004
The Bedbugs learn that even J. Edgar needs to go to the doctor sometimes. Once he gets over his stubbornness.
5	5	"Toofy's Trip to the Dentist"	October 4, 2004
Toofy discovers that going to the dentist can be fun.
6	6	"Snoozy Sneaks Up"	March 5, 2007
J. Edgar teaches Snoozy the importance of sneaking up.
7	7	"Woozy Plays Bugball"	November 5, 2006
Goofy and Toofy are surprised when Woozy turns out to be a great bugball player.
8	8	"World of Food"	April 8, 2005
Gooby, Toofy, and Woozy discover delicious food and silly songs from around the world.
9	9	"Pirates of the Bugabean"	September 8, 2004
Gooby, Toofy and Woozy go on a pirate adventure and find more than hidden treasure.
10	10	"Gooby Gets Upset"	October 9, 2004
When Gooby has trouble with his homework, his friends help by finding ways to make school fun.
11	11	"Rock Stars"	May 12, 2007
Bugville welcomes its latest rock 'n' roll band as Gooby, Toofy, and Woozy learn to make music.
12	12	"J. Edgar's Special Birthday"	March 10, 2006
The Bedbugs work together to make J. Edgar's birthday fun and exciting.
13	13	"Rainy Day"	September 10, 2004
The Bedbugs discover some great games to play inside on a rainy day.
14	14	"Woozy Gets Sick"	May 11, 2005
Gooby and Toofy learn that sometimes a bug hug is the best medicine.
15	15	"Gooby's Friend"	December 11, 2006
The Bedbugs discover that having a pet is quite an adventure.
16	16	"The Story of Little Flower"	February 12, 2007
The Bedbugs take a hike through the forest, and Woozy imagines herself to be a Native American princess.
17	17	"Dinosaur Egg"	July 12, 2006
Gooby discovers a dinosaur egg from the past.
18	18	"Healthy Food, Healthy You"	June 7, 2007
J. Edgar shows how much fun eating healthy foods can be.
19	19	"Help Your Neighbor"	June 7, 2006
Gooby, Toofy, and Woozy rally their neighbors in Bugville to help a friend in need.
20	20	"When I Grow Up"	June 8, 2004
The Bedbugs imagine what growing up will be like.
21	21	"Great Day for a Parade"	June 8, 2005
The Bedbugs hold a parade in their room.
22	22	"Gooby's Video Game"	June 9, 2005
The Bedbugs learn a valuable lesson when Gooby stays up all night playing video games.
23	23	"Gold Rush Mountain"	June 9, 2007
The Bedbugs look for gold in the Old West.
24	24	"Bugville Olympics"	June 10, 2006
The Bedbugs shape up by making exercise fun.
25	25	"Be Patient Woozy"	June 10, 2007
J. Edgar helps Woozy learn a lesson in patience.
26	26	"Bedbug Memories"	November 10, 2007
The Bedbugs remember good times past and lessons learned.
27	27	"Gooby's Glasses"	June 14, 2005
Gooby finds out that getting glasses isn't so bad after all.
28	28	"Always Tell the Truth"	June 14, 2005
The Bedbugs learn that being truthful is always best.

=== Season 2 (2005) ===
No. overall	No. in season	Title	Original release date
29	1	"Bugville County Fair"	September 21, 2005
The Bedbugs participate in pie-eating and pig-calling contests at the Bugville Fair.
30	2	"Going to Grandma's"	December 19, 2004
Woozy and Snoozy get ready to go to Grandma's.
31	3	"Bedbug Rodeo"	July 18, 2006
The Bedbugs go to a rodeo, discover why rules are important.
32	4	"Gooby for President"	November 3, 2006
The Bedbugs learn about American government.
33	5	"Story of Time"	March 27, 2008
The Bedbugs learn about telling time by going back to the era when Cavebugs walked the earth and first "watched" it.
34	6	"Telling Time"	July 23, 2007
The Bedbugs explore what they can do in a minute.
35	7	"Space Adventure"	February 14, 2006
The Bedbugs journey through space to find out whether the moon is really made out of cheese.
36	8	"Sunny Side Up"	June 24, 2006
The Bedbugs explain how the planets go around the sun.
37	9	"Alphabet Day"	April 25, 2005
Gooby, Woozy, and Toofy learn their ABCs.
38	10	"A Trip to the Toy Store"	February 17, 2006
Gooby, Woozy and Toofy find a fun way to earn money to buy new toys.
39	11	"Free Ruffy"	July 7, 2006
The Bedbugs work together to figure out how to get Ruffy out of his tank to play.
40	12	"Beethoven Gooby"	April 7, 2007
The Bedbugs learn about music.
41	13	"Trees, Trees, Trees"	January 8, 2008
The Bedbugs learn about trees while having a picnic in the Bugville forest.
42	14	"Four Seasons"	August 8, 2006
The Bedbugs plant a tree and watch it grow through all four seasons.
43	15	"Count Your Cookies"	December 9, 2007
When Gooby has problems in math class, the entire family learns how to have fun with arithmetic.
44	16	"Mind Your Manners"	February 15, 2008
J. Edgar offers a lesson in manners.
45	17	"Future Bugs"	March 1, 2008
Goofy, Toofy and Woozy have fun imagining what the future will look like in Bugville.
46	18	"Explore Your Senses"	March 10, 2008
Gooby, Toofy and Woozy use their sense of touch to explore different textures and shapes.
47	19	"The Vic the Vac Show"	May 11, 2008
The Bedbugs imagine that they are superstars on The Vic the Vac Show.
