= Tulip Time Festival =

Annual festival in Holland, Michigan

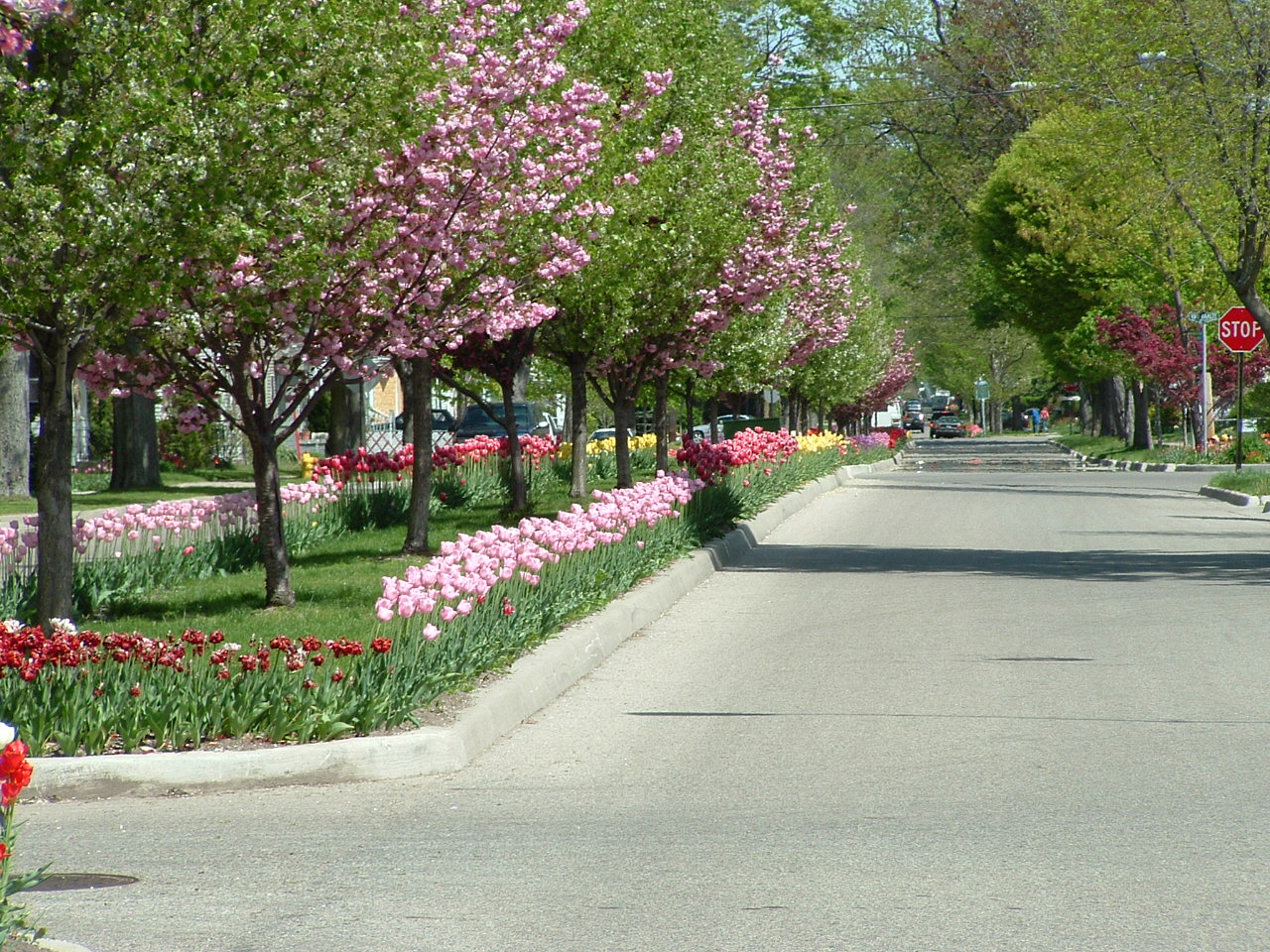
- Tulips line the streets
- Status: active
- Genre: Tulip festival
- Begins: May 3, 2025
- Ends: May 11, 2025
- Frequency: Annually
- Location: Holland, Michigan
- Coordinates: 42°47′N 86°6′W
- Country: US
- Years active: 96–97
- Inaugurated: 1929
- Website: tuliptime.com

Tulip Time Festival is an annual festival held in Holland, Michigan. Tulip festivals are held in many cities around the United States of America that were founded or largely inhabited by Dutch settlers. It has been held every year (except 2020) in mid-May since 1929 and is currently the longest running tulip festival in the United States. The festival currently runs from the first Saturday in May through the second Sunday.

Activities at the celebration include three parades, fireworks, a Dutch Market, various shows and concerts, a craft fair, klompen dancing, and street scrubbing. The city of Holland has millions of tulips lining the streets and in special tulip gardens throughout the city.

== History ==
Tulip Time's roots can be traced to a 1927 community beautification project. Lida Rogers, a biology teacher at Holland High School, suggested Holland adopt the tulip as its flower due to the city's close ties to The Netherlands.

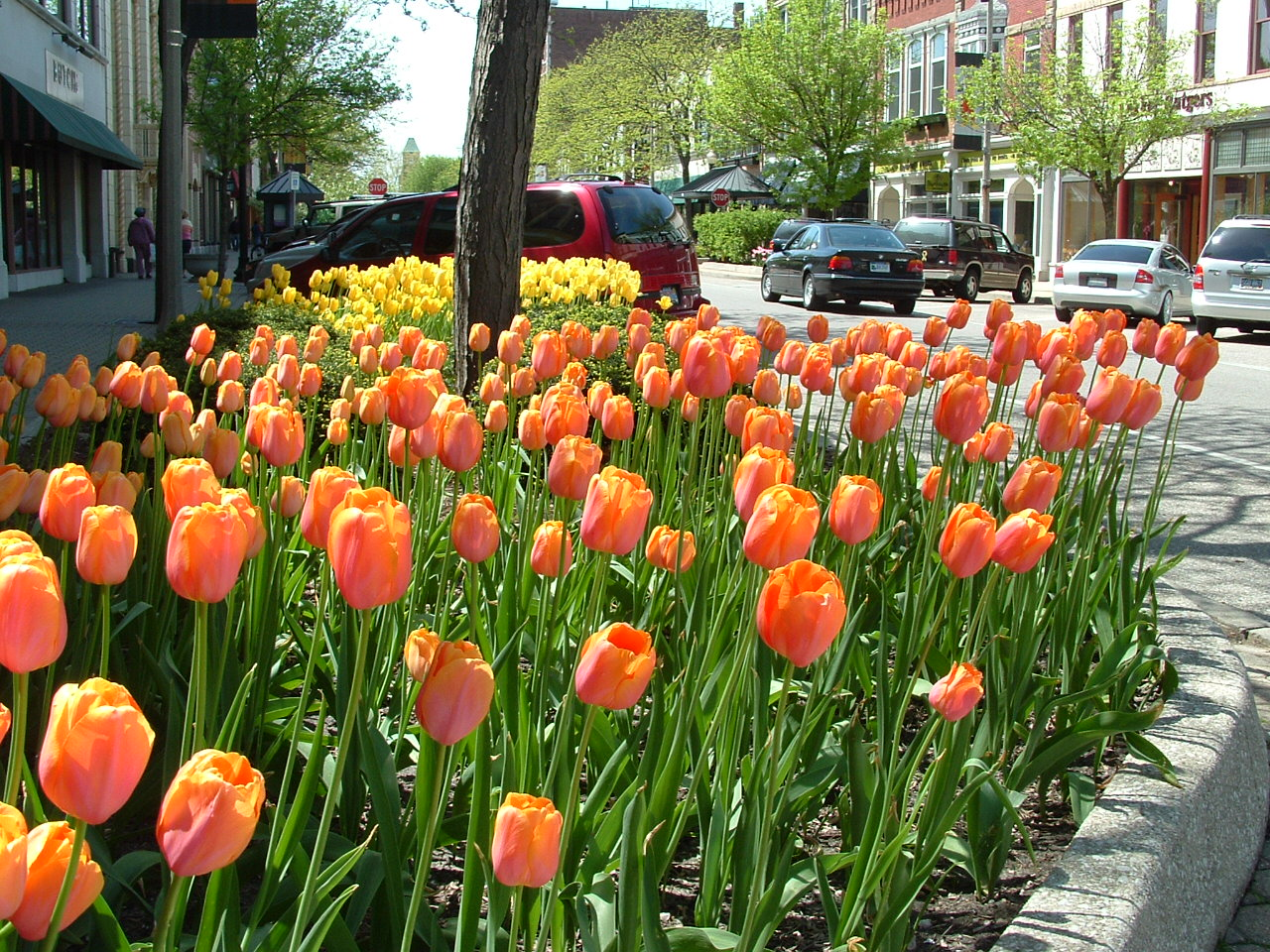
Tulip bed in downtown Holland

In 1928, City council approved funding to import 100,000 tulip bulbs from the Netherlands and plant them in city parks. The next year, the city invited visitors to come during the week including May 15. The success prompted an annual event to be born. During World War II, Tulip Time was scaled back, returning with a four-day festival in 1946.

The 1947 festival was geared towards celebrating Holland, Michigan's centennial. A tradition was started that year when Michigan's governor, Kim Sigler, donned a Dutch costume and took part in the festivities. As America celebrated its bicentennial in 1976, Tulip Time was honored with the presence of President Gerald R. Ford, a Michigander who had formerly represented nearby Grand Rapids in the United States Congress.

The reconstruction of the authentic 200-year-old "De Zwaan" windmill on Windmill Island in 1965 added another tourist attraction.

In 1991, Tulip Time expanded from four to ten days. In 2001, the festival was shortened to eight days and moved up a week to better coincide with when the tulips were in bloom. A carnival was added in 2003.

In 2008, the outdoor concert series, renamed Tulipalooza, was moved to the Sixth Street Stage at 6th street and College Ave.

The 2020 festival was canceled for the first time due to the COVID-19 crisis. In 2021 the festival was resumed virtually, and in 2022 the festival returned to in-person activities.

== Performances and appearances ==
The Tulip Time festival has hosted performances and appearances by many well known artists and public figures.

1977 featured Johnny Cash

2000 featured a concert by pop star Christina Aguilera.

2001 featured O-Town.

2006 featured performances by Frankie Avalon, The Oak Ridge Boys, Jars of Clay and AG Silver.

2007 featured Bruce Hornsby.

2008 featured entertainment included Jonny Lang, Tony Orlando, and Ronnie Milsap.

2009 featured Jan Mulder, 1964 The Tribute, Bobby Vinton, and The Oak Ridge Boys.

2010 featured The Coasters, The Drifters, & The Platters, Starship featuring Mickey Thomas (singer), and a seminar by former Blackwater Worldwide CEO and Holland native Erik Prince.

2014 featured comedian Bill Cosby.

== In popular culture ==
The festival is mentioned in The Simpsons episode "Mobile Homer" as one of the places that Homer wishes he could take his RV.

It was also featured in the 1942 film "Seven Sweethearts".

The tulip festival is featured in the 2025 movie “Holland”, featuring Nicole Kidman.
