= De Zwaan (windmill) =

- De Zwaan Windmill
- U.S. National Register of Historic Places
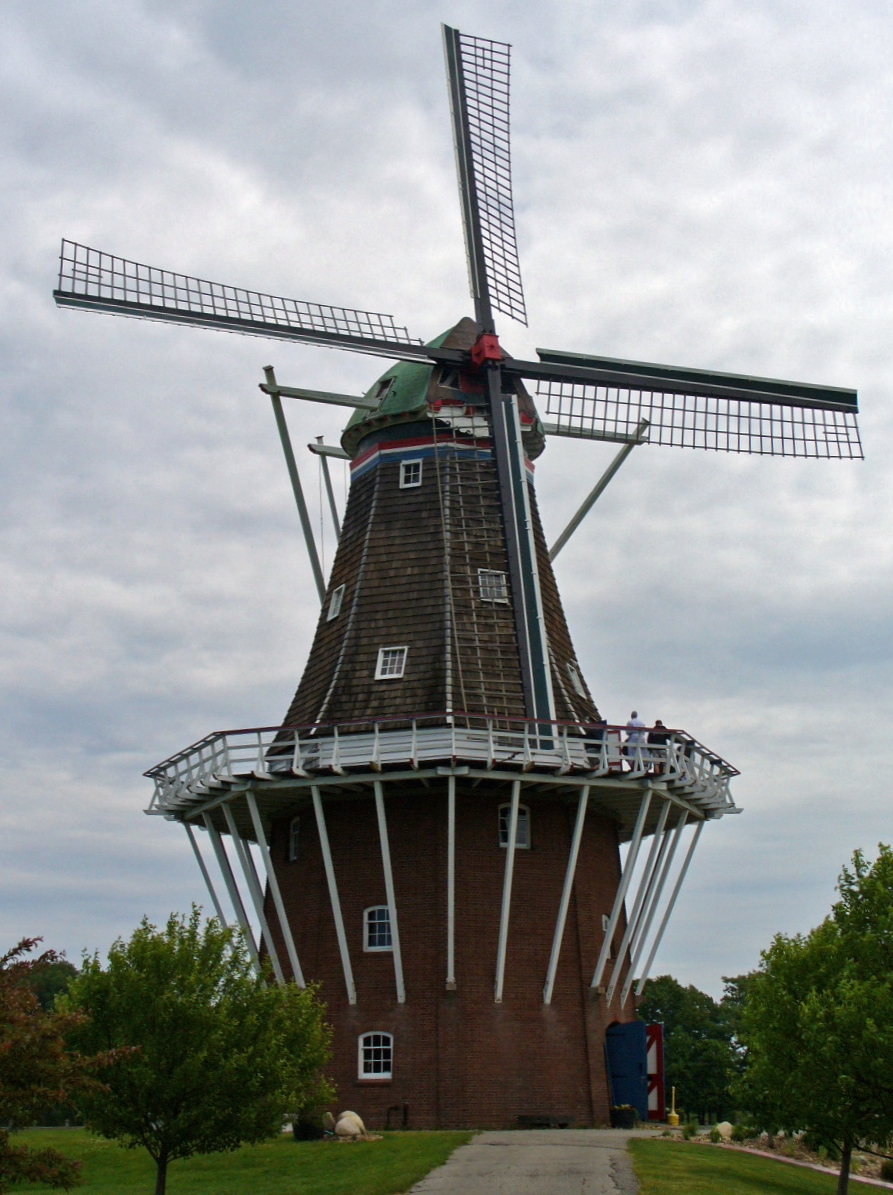

- Location within Michigan Location within the United States
- Interactive map
- Location: Windmill Island Gardens, 1 Lincoln Ave., Holland, Michigan
- Coordinates: 42°47′58″N 86°5′45″W
- Built: 1761
- NRHP reference No.: 100002333
- Added to NRHP: April 17, 2018

De Zwaan is an authentic Dutch windmill in the city of Holland, Michigan. The windmill's name is Dutch for The Swan. It is the oldest authentic, working Dutch windmill in the United States. De Zwaan is located in Windmill Island municipal park.

== History ==
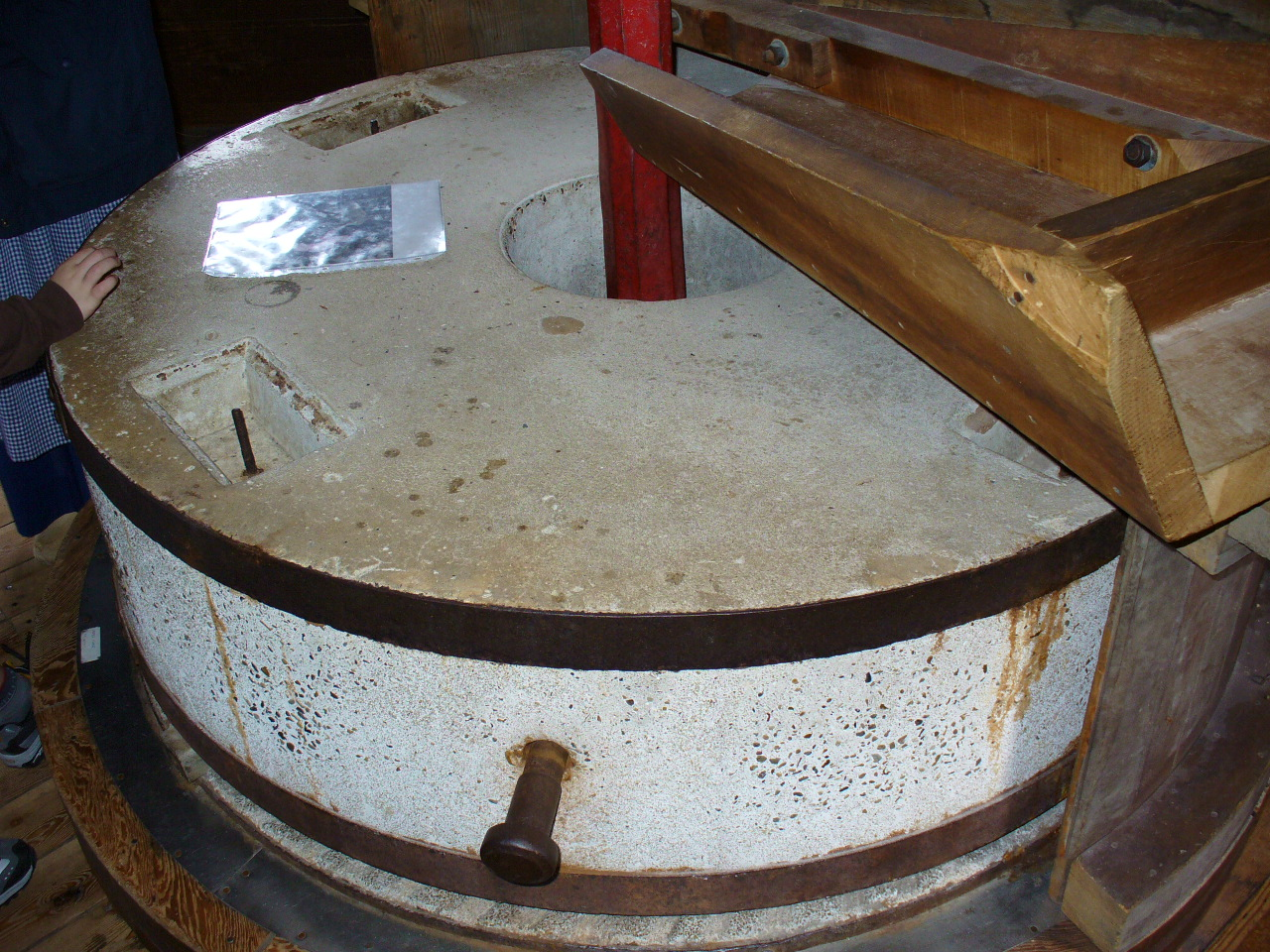
One of the two millstones from De Zwaan

When Holland, Michigan residents Willard Wichers and Carter Brown were looking for a way to pay homage to the city's Dutch heritage, they set up a project to bring a Dutch windmill over to the United States. However, many of these listed structures had suffered serious damage in World War II. As a result, the Dutch government had imposed a ban on the sale of windmills outside the Netherlands. Wichers and his group were able to obtain an exemption by selecting a severely-damaged mill known as De Zwaan, that had been in operation in Vinkel (the Netherlands) since being moved there in 1884 by a family named Van Schayk. De Zwaan was at the center of a controversy, with three local agencies unable to determine the future of the damaged windmill. The Dutch government decided to sell it to Wichers for $2800, making De Zwaan the last windmill to leave the Netherlands. Windmill authorities in the Netherlands provided the City of Holland with the history of De Zwaan, noting that it had been built in Krommenie, Netherlands, in 1761 as a grain mill set on a raised base in order to enhance wind capture.

In October, 1964, De Zwaan arrived aboard the Prins Willem van Oranje. It was unloaded at the Muskegon harbor and transported by truck to Windmill Island in Holland. It took approximately six months to reconstruct the mill. The city erected a raised base rather than the mound of earth it had been set on in Vinkel, so as to restore it to its original design when it stood in Krommenie. Once erected, the City of Holland celebrated it as having been over 200 years old at the time.

In April 1965, the 125-foot (38 m) windmill was formally declared open on Windmill Island, a 36-acre (150,000 m^{2}) site reclaimed from a swamp on the eastern end of Lake Macatawa. It is open from late April through early October.

When winds are favorable (15 to 20 mph (7 to 9 m/s) from the west), De Zwaan's 80-foot (24 m) diameter blades are usually in motion.

In 2015, the City of Holland celebrated the 50th anniversary of De Zwaan being in Holland. In preparation for the celebrations, De Zwaan's resident Miller and historian, Alisa Crawford, started compiling the only definitive book ever written about De Zwaan. She holds a master's degree in museum studies and is the only Dutch certified miller in the United States, an accreditation she earned after years of independent study while working for the City of Holland at De Zwaan. While researching data about De Zwaan's original construction, Crawford learned that De Zwaan in Krommenie had been taken down in 1887, which was three years after De Zwaan had been relocated to Vinkel. She realized that there had, in fact, been at least two windmills in the Netherlands named De Zwaan.

Ultimately, Crawford was able to prove that the De Zwaan windmill which was relocated to Holland, Michigan, had originally been erected in Dordrecht, Zuid-Holland as a zaagmolen (sawmill) in 1833. The mill was converted to steam power in 1884 and its eight-sided body, cap, and blades become superfluous. At that point the Van Schayk family purchased it for relocation to Vinkel. They also purchased parts from a different mill, probably the Nooitgedacht ('who'd have thought it', or literally 'never thought') that had been built in 1800 in 's-Hertogenbosch (abbreviated to 'Den Bosch'), and dismantled in 1883.

This information revealed that De Zwaan was actually about 70 years younger than the City of Holland had been led to believe when it acquired the windmill in 1964, and was a hybrid mill built from the structure and components of two or three other mills. Crawford notes "that lineage is what makes De Zwaan unequivocally authentic. Windmills were (and still are) working machines. When they break, they are repaired. When the parts wear out, they are replaced. When they became outmoded, they are repurposed."

== National Register of Historic Places ==
After the publication of her book, De Zwaan: The True Story of America's Authentic Dutch Windmill Alisa Crawford wrote the nomination of De Zwaan to the National Register of Historic Places on behalf of the City of Holland. The mill was listed on the register in 2018.

The City of Holland erected a State Historic Marker at De Zwaan in 2019. The text on one side reads:

In 1961 Castle Park resort owner Carter P. Brown proposed the idea of creating a public park with "an authentic Dutch windmill," a symbol of Holland's Dutch heritage. To do so, city officials needed permission from the Dutch government, which protects windmills as national monuments. Willard C. Wichers, Midwest director for the Netherlands Information Service, led negotiations with the Dutch over a three-year period. In June 1964 he travelled to the Netherlands to find a suitable mill and finalize arrangements to buy and move it. In Vinkel, Noord-Brabant, stood a mill that had been built in 1884 using pieces from older mills. Named De Zwaan (the Swan), it had been damaged during World War II and had deteriorated. Dutch officials allowed its sale but required that Dutch millwright Jan D. Medendorp supervise its relocation and restoration.

== See also ==
- Tulip Time
