= The Twilight Saga: Breaking Dawn – Part 2 =

2012 film by Bill Condon

- Theatrical release poster
- Directed by: Bill Condon
- Screenplay by: Melissa Rosenberg
- Based on: Breaking Dawn by Stephenie Meyer
- Produced by: Wyck Godfrey; Karen Rosenfelt; Stephenie Meyer
- Starring: Kristen Stewart; Robert Pattinson; Taylor Lautner; Billy Burke; Peter Facinelli; Elizabeth Reaser; Kellan Lutz; Nikki Reed; Jackson Rathbone; Ashley Greene; Michael Sheen; Dakota Fanning
- Cinematography: Guillermo Navarro
- Edited by: Virginia Katz; Ian Slater
- Music by: Carter Burwell
- Production companies: Temple Hill Entertainment; Sunswept Entertainment
- Distributed by: Summit Entertainment
- Release dates: November 12, 2012 (Nokia Theatre); November 16, 2012; (United States)
- Running time: 115 minutes
- Country: United States
- Language: English
- Budget: $136 million
- Box office: $868 million

The Twilight Saga: Breaking Dawn – Part 2 is a 2012 American romantic fantasy film directed by Bill Condon and written by Melissa Rosenberg, The second of two cinematic parts based on the 2008 novel by Stephenie Meyer, It is the fifth and final installment of The Twilight Saga film series. The film features Kristen Stewart, Robert Pattinson, and Taylor Lautner reprising their roles from the previous films, with the ensemble cast also including Billy Burke, Peter Facinelli, Elizabeth Reaser, Kellan Lutz, Nikki Reed, Jackson Rathbone, Ashley Greene, Michael Sheen, and Dakota Fanning. In the film, Bella, now a vampire, aligns with the Cullens, the werewolves, and other allies to face the Volturi, who view her half-human, half-vampire child as a possible threat.

Summit Entertainment announced that Breaking Dawn would be adapted into a two-part film on June 10, 2010. Principal photography for both parts began on November 1, 2010, and wrapped on April 22, 2011. The second part was shot in Baton Rouge, New Orleans and Vancouver.

The Twilight Saga: Breaking Dawn – Part 2 premiered at the Nokia Theatre in Los Angeles on November 12, 2012, and was theatrically released in the United States on November 16, by Summit Entertainment. The film received mixed reviews from critics and grossed $868 million, becoming the sixth-highest-grossing film of 2012 and the highest-grossing of the series. The film received eleven nominations at the 33rd Golden Raspberry Awards and won seven, including Worst Picture.

== Plot ==
The film continues from the events of the previous film, as Bella, who has just given birth, awakens from her human-to-vampire transformation. After her vampire husband Edward Cullen helps her tame her initial thirst for blood, Bella is introduced to their daughter Renesmee. The rest of the Cullens and Bella's werewolf friend Jacob stay nearby, and when Jacob acts possessively towards Renesmee, Bella learns he has "imprinted" on her, a werewolf phenomenon that makes Jacob and Renesmee soul-mates.

Meanwhile, Bella's father, Charlie, has been trying to contact the Cullens for updates on Bella's health. Carlisle, the Cullen patriarch and a medical doctor, announces that they have to leave Forks, Washington, to protect their identities.

Jacob, desperate not to lose Renesmee, visits Charlie and tells him that Bella is alive and vaguely describes that she has transformed, revealing his wolf form to Charlie to persuade him to stop asking further questions. Charlie goes to the Cullen house to see Bella and meet Renesmee. He accepts that Bella is now recovered but somehow different, though he does not know what has changed or where Renesmee came from, instead accepting she is "adopted".

Several months pass with Carlisle monitoring Renesmee's rapid growth. The vampire Irina spots Renesmee in the forest and mistakenly assumes she is an "immortal child": a type of vampire transformed in childhood who, because it cannot be reasoned with or trained, sucks the blood out of humans uncontrollably. The creation of such children is outlawed by the vampire leadership, the Volturi, and anyone caught with one is executed on the spot. Irina reports the supposed crime to the Volturi.

After Edward's sister Alice, who can see glimpses of the future, experiences a vision of the Volturi and Irina coming to kill the Cullens, she instructs the others to gather as many witnesses as they can to testify that Renesmee is not an immortal child.

As the Volturi serve punishments swiftly, the Cullens and their werewolf allies prepare for a possible battle. Bella soon realizes she has a special ability: a powerful mental shield that had protected her from Edward's mind-reading even when she was human, which she is taught to extend to protect others from vampire superpowers.

The army of the Volturi arrives in Forks, led by Aro, who can read people's minds by touching them. Seeing the Cullens alongside their witnesses and allies, the Volturi hesitate. The Cullens are able to prove to Aro that Renesmee is not an immortal child.

However, the Volturi are eager to subdue the Cullens to forcibly enlist their talented members, so they summarily execute Irina for her mistake to provoke the Cullens into battle. But before an all-out fight breaks out, Alice appears in time to give Aro her vision of the future if fighting ensues.

In Alice's vision, Carlisle, Jasper, Aro, and several others on all sides are killed in a violent battle while Jacob and Renesmee escape. Aro, despite being afraid of the vision, still wants to execute Renesmee as she might be a threat to the vampires' secrecy.

Alice reveals their final witness, a Mapuche man from South America, who is a half-human half-vampire, just like Renesmee. He proves that he is not a threat, supporting the notion that Renesmee is not one either. The Volturi unhappily leave, Aro concluding that there will be no battle today.

Back at the Cullen home, Alice glimpses the future, seeing Edward and Bella greeting Jacob and a fully matured Renesmee, also a couple, on a sun-dappled beach. Edward reads Alice's mind and feels relieved that Renesmee has Jacob to protect her.

Alone in their favorite meadow, Bella pushes her mental shield away and finally allows Edward to see into her mind, showing him every moment they have shared together in a montage. They kiss after Bella tells him, "nobody has ever loved anybody as much as I love you", and he romantically responds "There’s one exception".

== Cast ==
- Kristen Stewart as Bella Cullen (née Swan)
- Robert Pattinson as Edward Cullen
- Taylor Lautner as Jacob Black
- Mackenzie Foy as Renesmee Cullen
- Ashley Greene as Alice Cullen
- Jackson Rathbone as Jasper Hale
- Peter Facinelli as Carlisle Cullen
- Elizabeth Reaser as Esme Cullen
- Kellan Lutz as Emmett Cullen
- Nikki Reed as Rosalie Hale
- Billy Burke as Charlie Swan
- Michael Sheen as Aro
- Jamie Campbell Bower as Caius
- Dakota Fanning as Jane
- Christopher Heyerdahl as Marcus
- Cameron Bright as Alec
- Casey LaBow as Kate
- MyAnna Buring as Tanya
- Maggie Grace as Irina
- Lee Pace as Garrett
- Christian Camargo as Eleazar
- Mía Maestro as Carmen
- Noel Fisher as Vladimir
- Guri Weinberg as Stefan
- Joe Anderson as Alistair
- Angela Sarafyan as Tia
- Rami Malek as Benjamin
- Daniel Cudmore as Felix
- Judith Shekoni as Zafrina
- Tracey Heggins as Senna
- Charlie Bewley as Demetri
- J. D. Pardo as Nahuel
- Marisa Quinn as Huilen
- Booboo Stewart as Seth Clearwater
- Julia Jones as Leah Clearwater
- Alex Rice as Sue Clearwater
- Wendell Pierce as J. Jenks
- Lateef Crowder as Santiago
- Andrea Powell as Sasha
- Billy Wagenseller as Vasilii
- Toni Trucks as Mary
- Andrea Gabriel as Kebi
- Chaske Spencer as Sam Uley
- Omar Metwally as Amun
- Valorie Curry as Charlotte
- Marlane Barnes as Maggie
- Erik Odom as Peter
- Lisa Howard as Siobhan
- Bill Tangradi as Randall
- Patrick Brennan as Liam
- Amadou Ly as Henri
- Janelle Froehlich as Yvette
- Masami Kosaka as Toshiro
- Grazi Nunes as Wolf Grazi

Gil Birmingham, Sarah Clarke, Michael Welch, Anna Kendrick, Christian Serratos, Justin Chon, Cam Gigandet, Edi Gathegi, Rachelle Lefevre, Kiowa Gordon, Tyson Houseman, Alex Meraz, Bronson Pelletier, Graham Greene, Tinsel Korey, Alex Rice, Xavier Samuel, Jodelle Ferland, Bryce Dallas Howard, and Carolina Virguez appear through archive footage during the credits, accompanied by a duet version of Christina Perri's "A Thousand Years" with Steve Kazee providing additional vocals.

== Production ==
=== Development ===
On June 10, 2010, Summit Entertainment announced that a two-part adaptation of the novel Breaking Dawn would start filming in November and made clear that all major actors would return for both parts.

=== Pre-production ===
By August 2010, screenwriter Melissa Rosenberg said that the scripts for Part 1 and 2 were 75 to 85 percent completed. She found the greatest challenge in writing the scripts to be the final sequence of Part 2, explaining, "The final battle sequence is a big challenge because it lasts 25 pages. It's almost an entire three-act story in and of itself. You have to track [keep it all in one setting] hundreds of characters. It's an enormous challenge to choreograph on the page and for Bill [Condon] to choreograph on the stage." She had written various drafts of the scene but, at the time, hadn't revised or discussed them with Condon yet. She said, "That's the next big hurdle to sit down with the stunt coordinator and create the ballet. It's a lot of work. I'm exhausted, but we're intent on making them the best scripts yet." Producer Wyck Godfrey called Part 2 "an action film in terms of life-and-death stakes" and said that in Part 1 "there are the pangs of newlywed tension that occur that are relatable even in a fantasy film. Marriage is not quite the experience that they thought it was."

Godfrey considered releasing the second film in 3D to differentiate between the time before and after Bella becomes a vampire, an idea originally proposed for The Twilight Saga: Eclipse, but said that the decision was up to Condon. However, he said that if the second film were to be released in 3D, he would like to shoot it with the proper equipment in "real" 3D as was done with Avatar (2009), not convert it into 3D in post-production as was done with Clash of the Titans (2010).

=== Filming ===
Principal photography started on November 1, 2010, and wrapped on April 22, 2011, ending the franchise's three years of production since March 2008. Filming was shot on location in Baton Rouge and New Orleans, Louisiana; and Vancouver, Canada. Filming also occurred at Raleigh Studios in Baton Rouge.

On the subject of the final day and her final moment as Bella, Stewart stated, "After that scene, my true final scene, I felt like I could shoot up into the night sky and every pore of my body would shoot light. I felt lighter than I've ever felt in my life."

In April 2012, the crew and some of the cast, including Pattinson and Stewart, returned for reshoots to pick up some additional shots for technical work. These re-shoots did not include any new scenes or dialogue.

=== Special effects ===
Tippett Studio first began working on the CGI (computer-generated imagery) wolves in February 2009 for The Twilight Saga: New Moon, and the look of the creatures has evolved, becoming more photo-real over the course of the saga, with the input of three different directors. "It's a subtle balance of just how anthropomorphic these wolves are," says Eric Leven. "Bill [Condon] wanted to make sure that we had a sense of the human or the shapeshifter in there. Finding that balance of how much of a human performance versus an animal performance was important for Bill."

Leven adds, "Bill has always treated the wolves as characters and never as computer-generated things, and directs them in the same way he'd direct any actor. He would always give us direction like Sam should be angrier. It's the best way to work. His treating these creatures as characters, instead of just computer bits, was really great."

"Because we've been working on this franchise for such a prolonged period of time, we've been able to improve the look from show to show," comments Phil Tippett. "Wolves generally are pretty darn clean and since Bill wanted the wolves rangier, that means a lot more fur matting and clumping, like they've lived out in the woods. We edged towards something a bit more feral."

"However, there is also a balance between look and technology," adds Tippett. "The body count of the wolves escalates and because we're adding a great deal more hair to get the right texture, that fur really ups the rendering time. We've gone from four wolves to eight to twelve, to sixteen in Part 2. So we have to be very careful about that balance because it takes hundreds of hours to render each wolf."

== Music ==
It was revealed in January 2012 that the soundtrack for Part 2 had already started production. Confirmed for the soundtrack in advance were "Heart of Stone" by Iko, which plays when Edward and Bella are talking in the cottage after finding Alice's note and "Where I Come From" by Passion Pit, which will play when Bella wakes up from her transformation. The lead single from the soundtrack is "The Forgotten", performed by the American rock band Green Day. "A Thousand Years, Pt. 2" by the American singer Christina Perri is also featured on the soundtrack album.

Carter Burwell, the composer of Twilight and Breaking Dawn: Part 1, returned to score the final installment of the series.

== Release ==
Fans registered online for a chance and circa 1,500 people spent the weekend at a temporary tent city on Friday ahead of Monday's premiere screening, in the street in front of Staples Center and across L.A. Live plaza, outside of Nokia Theatre L.A. Live, now Peacock Theater in Los Angeles.

=== Box office ===
The Twilight Saga: Breaking Dawn – Part 2 earned $293 million in North America and $575 million in other territories, for a worldwide total of $868 million. The film is the sixth-highest-grossing film of 2012, and the highest-grossing film of the Twilight series. It had a $340.9 million worldwide opening, which was the eighth-largest ever, the largest for the Twilight franchise, and the largest for a film released outside the summer period.

In North America, the film grossed $30.4 million in Thursday night and midnight showings, achieving the third-highest midnight gross and the highest midnight gross of the franchise. Breaking Dawn – Part 2 made $71.2 million on its opening day, which is the sixth-highest opening- and single-day gross as well as the third-highest of the franchise. For its opening weekend, the movie earned $141.1 million, which is the 13th-highest-grossing opening weekend of all time, the second-highest-grossing of the franchise, the third-largest November opening, and the fourth-largest opening of 2012. It retained first place in its second weekend by dropping 69.1% with a gross of $43.6 million over the three-day weekend and made a total of $64.4 million over the five-day Thanksgiving holiday weekend. In its third weekend, Breaking Dawn Part – 2 held onto the number one spot again by dropping 60.1% and grossing $17.4 million. It became the third-highest-grossing film of the franchise behind Eclipse and New Moon.

Outside North America, the film opened on Wednesday, November 14, 2012, in six countries earning $13.8 million. By Thursday, it had opened in 37 territories, earning $38.8 million. In all territories, it opened with similar or higher earnings than its immediate predecessor. Through its first Friday, it earned $91.0 million, after expanding to 61 territories. By the end of its opening weekend (Wednesday–Sunday), it scored a series-best $199.5 million opening from 61 territories on 12,812 screens. This is the eighth-largest opening outside North America and the largest 2012 opening. IMAX showings generated $3 million from 82 locations. The film's largest openings were recorded in the UK, Ireland, and Malta ($25.2 million), Russia and the CIS ($22.0 million), and France and the Maghreb region ($17.9 million). In Spain, it set a three-day opening-weekend record with $11.9 million. In total earnings, its three highest-grossing markets after North America are the UK, Ireland, and Malta ($57.9 million), Brazil ($54.2 million), and Russia and the CIS ($42.8 million).

== Reception ==
On Rotten Tomatoes, the film has a 49% approval rating and an average score of 5.3/10 based on 197 reviews. The consensus states: "It's the most entertaining Twilight, but that's not enough to make Breaking Dawn Part 2 worth watching for filmgoers who don't already count themselves among the franchise converts." On Metacritic, it has a weighted average score of 52 out of 100 based on reviews from 31 critics. Audiences polled by CinemaScore gave it an average rating of "A".

Todd McCarthy of The Hollywood Reporter wrote, "The final installment of the immortal Bella/Edward romance will give its breathlessly awaiting international audience just what it wants". Owen Gleiberman of Entertainment Weekly said, "Breaking Dawn: Part 2 starts off slow but gathers momentum, and that's because, with Bella and Edward united against the Volturi, the picture has a real threat". Sara Stewart of the New York Post wrote, "Finally, someone took the source material at its terribly written word and stopped treating the whole affair so seriously". Justin Chang of Variety praised the performance of Stewart by saying, "No longer a mopey, lower-lip-biting emo girl, this Bella is twitchy, feral, formidable and fully energized, a goddess even among her exalted bloodsucker brethren". Manohla Dargis of The New York Times said, "Despite the slow start Mr. Condon closes the series in fine, smooth style. He gives fans all the lovely flowers, conditioned hair and lightly erotic, dreamy kisses they deserve".

Roger Ebert of the Chicago Sun-Times gave the film two-and-a-half stars out of four, saying "its audience, which takes these films very seriously indeed, will drink deeply of its blood. The sensational closing sequence cannot be accused of leaving a single loophole, not even some of those we didn't know were there". He concluded by saying, "Breaking Dawn, Part 2 must be one of the more serious entries in any major movie franchise... it bit the bullet, and I imagine fans will be pleased." Helen O'Hara of Empire gave the film a mixed review and said, "Fans will be left on a high; other viewers will be confused but generally entertained by a saga whose romance is matched only by its weirdness".

== Home media ==
The Twilight Saga: Breaking Dawn – Part 2 was released on DVD and Blu-ray on March 2, 2013. As of June 1, 2014, Breaking Dawn: Part 2 has sold 4,810,249 DVDs along with 1,224,869 Blu-ray Discs for $71,418,469 and $24,472,107, respectively, totaling $99,195,325.

== Possible spin-offs ==
In September 2016, Lionsgate co-chairman Patrick Wachsberger stated that a sequel was "a possibility", but would only go ahead if Stephenie Meyer wanted to do one. On August 8, 2017, Variety reported that Lionsgate CEO Jon Feltheimer has interest in having spinoffs made for The Twilight Saga, and wants to create a writers' room to explore the idea.

== Accolades ==
Year	Award	Category	Recipients	Result	Ref.
2013	Empire Cinemas Alternative Movie Awards	Best On-Screen Couple	Edward Cullen (Robert Pattinson) and Bella Swan (Kristen Stewart)	Won	
2013	Empire Cinemas Alternative Movie Awards	Best On-Screen Kiss	Edward Cullen (Robert Pattinson) and Bella Swan (Kristen Stewart)	Won	
2013	Empire Cinemas Alternative Movie Awards	Best Fight Scenes	Breaking Dawn – Part 2	Won	
2013	Empire Cinemas Alternative Movie Awards	Best Film Villain	Aro (Michael Sheen)	Won	
2013	Empire Cinemas Alternative Movie Awards	Best Male Body	Jacob Black (Taylor Lautner)	Won	
2013	Golden Raspberry Awards	Worst Picture	Breaking Dawn – Part 2	Won	
2013	Golden Raspberry Awards	Worst Actor	Robert Pattinson	Nominated	
2013	Golden Raspberry Awards	Worst Actress	Kristen Stewart (for Breaking Dawn – Pt. 2 and Snow White and the Huntsman)	Won	
2013	Golden Raspberry Awards	Worst Supporting Actor	Taylor Lautner	Won	
2013	Golden Raspberry Awards	Worst Supporting Actress	Ashley Greene	Nominated	
2013	Golden Raspberry Awards	Worst Screen Couple	Mackenzie Foy and Taylor Lautner	Won	
2013	Golden Raspberry Awards	Worst Screen Couple	Robert Pattinson and Kristen Stewart	Nominated	
2013	Golden Raspberry Awards	Worst Prequel, Remake, Rip-off or Sequel	Breaking Dawn – Part 2	Won	
2013	Golden Raspberry Awards	Worst Director	Bill Condon	Won	
2013	Golden Raspberry Awards	Worst Screenplay	Melissa Rosenberg and Stephenie Meyer	Nominated	
2013	Golden Raspberry Awards	Worst Screen Ensemble	Entire cast of Breaking Dawn – Part 2	Won	
2013	MTV Movie Awards	Best Shirtless Performance	Taylor Lautner	Won	
2013	Moviefone Fonie Award	Most Extreme Role Adjustment	Kristen Stewart (for Breaking Dawn – Pt. 2 and On the Road)	Won	
2013	Nickelodeon Kids' Choice Awards	Favorite Movie Actress	Kristen Stewart	Won	
2013	Nickelodeon UK Kids' Choice Awards	Favourite UK Actor	Robert Pattinson	Won	
2013	People's Choice Awards	Favorite Movie Fan Following	Twihards	Won	
2013	Richard Attenborough Film Award	British Performer of the Year	Robert Pattinson	Won	
2013	Virgin Media Award	Hottest Movie Actor	Robert Pattinson	Won	
2013	Virgin Media Award	Hottest Movie Actress	Kristen Stewart	Won	
2013	Young Artist Award	Best Performance in a Feature Film – Supporting Young Actress	Mackenzie Foy	Nominated	
2013	Teen Choice Awards	Choice Movie: Romance Actress	Kristen Stewart	Won	
2013	Teen Choice Awards	Choice Movie: Scene Stealer	Kellan Lutz	Won	
2013	Teen Choice Awards	Choice Movie: Sci-Fi/Fantasy Actor	Taylor Lautner	Won	
2013	Teen Choice Awards	Choice Movie: Sci-Fi/Fantasy Actor	Robert Pattinson	Nominated	
2013	Teen Choice Awards	Choice Movie: Sci-Fi/Fantasy Actress	Kristen Stewart	Won	
2013	Teen Choice Awards	Choice Movie: Sci-Fi/Fantasy	Breaking Dawn – Part 2	Won	
2013	Teen Choice Awards	Choice Movie: Romance Actor	Robert Pattinson	Won	
2013	Teen Choice Awards	Choice Movie: Romance	Breaking Dawn – Part 2	Won	

== See also ==
- Vampire films
