= List of The Host characters =

The Host is a 2008 novel by Stephenie Meyer which was adapted into a 2013 film directed by Andrew Niccol.

== Main characters ==
Wanderer "Wanda" — Wanderer is the main character, a parasitic alien "Soul" inserted into Melanie Stryder's body in the first scene. She received her name due to the number of planets she has lived on and having never lived more than one host's life on them. She is later nicknamed "Wanda" by Mel's Uncle Jeb and her brother, Jamie. On the Mists Planet she was known as Lives in the Stars and then briefly as "Rides the Beast" due to her riding a claw beast that had been implanted with a Soul, but she disliked the latter name. Initially only interested in enjoying her new life, Melanie's refusal to fade away as expected forces her to make choices she otherwise would not have, and she slowly develops sympathy for the human characters, eventually acknowledging that they have a right to their own lives, and attempting to sacrifice herself so that Melanie can have her life back. She is uncomfortable with violence, and enjoys being a storyteller, a role she indicates having held in previous hosts. Her physical capabilities are determined by her host. She is initially oblivious to Ian's growing affection for her, and so is surprised when she overhears Ian O'Shea and Jared Howe arguing about it just outside her door. Even though Wanda comes to dearly love Ian, she is limited because Melanie's body loves Jared. She hates upsetting people and so suffers endlessly trying to be as little of a burden as possible. At the end of The Host she is placed in Pet's body, allowing Wanda and Ian to finally be together. In the film she is portrayed by Saoirse Ronan (Melanie) and Emily Browning (Pet).

Melanie "Mel" Stryder — Melanie is a 21-year-old human (she was 17 when she met Jared) who was captured and implanted with a Soul after years of evading the Seekers. Melanie survives Wanderer's implantation into her body, and resists the Soul's control as best she can. She likes the feeling of being physically strong and berates Wanderer for neglecting to keep her that way. She has a temper and may be considered volatile compared to docile Wanderer. Melanie is passionately in love with another human, Jared Howe, and shares a strong bond with her brother, Jamie. It is clear from their relationship and previous interactions that their years on the run made her extremely protective of him. Despite initial anger at Wanderer for stealing her life, they gradually become unwilling allies, and finally develop a friendship and a sister-like bond. Melanie, despite wanting her body back, sides with Ian when Wanda decides to give Melanie her body back by telling Doc how to take out a Soul. Wanda did not intend to go on living after she was removed from her head, and wanted to be buried next to Walter and Wes. Melanie ensured Doc had not done that part of his promise, and eventually Melanie found a suitable body for Wanda. Melanie is described as having hazel eyes, dark hair, and sun-browned skin.

Ian O'Shea – Wanderer calls Ian "as kind as a Soul, but strong as only a human could be." He has a strong dislike of the Souls in the beginning, but quickly abandons it once he begins to empathize with Wanderer. Other characters seem to view him as mostly level-headed. However he does have a temper; he shows violent and aggressive reactions when Wanderer is at risk, particularly when it is his brother attacking her. Ian befriends Wanderer and gradually falls in love with her, telling her that "[she] is beautiful", not just the body she wears. He doesn't help Melanie find a new body for Wanda, which surprises Melanie. Ian said he didn't care what she looked like; he loved Wanda for her personality. At the end of the book, he is in a relationship with Wanderer, who has been put into a new host body. He is described as being tall and muscular, with black hair, sapphire blue eyes, and fair skin. In the film he is portrayed by Jake Abel.

Jared Howe — Melanie's lover. Jared is 26 years old when he and Melanie first meet (in most of the story, he is 29). Loving, aggressive, and somewhat excitable in Melanie's memories, by the time Wanderer meets him he has become quite bitter. He bears a grudge against Wanderer, and is unable to empathize with her for most of the book. He starts to change his views on the Soul, however, when he sees her comforting a dying friend. He is somewhat of a rival to Ian O'Shea, who sees him as competition for Wanderer's affections. He also has a parental relationship with Jamie, whom he continued to care for after Melanie's capture. He is described as being muscular and tall, with tan skin, sienna-colored eyes and naturally dark, but sun-bleached hair. His survival skills are an asset to the group, and he is considered responsible and capable by most other characters, but his rational thinking sometimes becomes a bother to the more sentimental humans. In the film he is portrayed by Max Irons.

Jamie Stryder – Jamie is Melanie's brother and is 14 years old when he first meets Wanderer. His behavior and emotions are generally childish, representing an idealized innocence; unlike most characters, he holds no animosity towards Wanderer for stealing his sister's body or life. He quickly comes to view Wanderer as a substitute sibling, and draws her into the group with his interest in her stories and opinions. Despite his apparent innocence and naivete, Jamie wants to be treated like an adult; he yearns to go on raids with the others, and is uncomfortable with the coddling he receives when he is injured. He describes the medicine Wanda brings to save him as 'magic' and gets to choose Wanda's body in the end. Jamie is portrayed by Chandler Canterbury in the film.

Uncle Jeb – Jebediah "Jeb" is Melanie's eccentric uncle. He was one of the first humans to suspect an alien invasion, and thus constructed an elaborate hide-out in caves beneath the Arizona desert. He maintains strict control over the hideout by virtue of having the only firearm. He believes Wanderer can fit in with the humans, and pushes for this to the point of creating great strain within the group. He is calm and deliberate in his decision-making, and despite being one of the most welcoming towards Wanderer, nonetheless does not hesitate to explain and justify the humans' perspective to her. William Hurt portrays Jeb in the film.

Terra The Seeker — The Soul responsible for finding Melanie's family. Mutual spite towards Terra is the basis of Melanie and Wanderer's early relationship. She is described as unusually irritable and edgy for her species. She mocks Wanda for not being able to completely drive out Melanie's spirit. This is later revealed to be due to her insecurity at having failed to subdue her own host, who remembers her name and recovers most of her personality when Terra is finally removed. Both the Soul and the host are extremely unlikeable. She is portrayed by Diane Kruger in the film.

Kyle O'Shea — Kyle, Ian's brother, is a fiery character with a strong dislike of Souls. This is implied to spring from the loss of his girlfriend, Jodi, who was caught and implanted early in the war. He is impulsive, and tends to take precipitous action without considering the group's opinion, which can lead to danger for himself. Due to this quality, he is not trusted to lead raiding missions. His hatred for Souls disappears when he realizes that his girlfriend cannot be saved, and he begins a relationship with Sunny, the Soul inside Jodi. Before finding Jodi's body, Kyle despised Wanda and caused a cave-in in the bathroom trying to kill her. Boyd Holbrook portrays Kyle in the film.

Doc — A tall, slim human rebel who was a surgeon and serves as the rebels' doctor. He is shown as deeply affected by his patient's suffering, which in combination with the conditions, places him under great strain; this drives him to alcoholism, such as they can afford. He is very interested in finding out how the Souls invaded, and their surgical practices, attempting to rescue the victims of the invasion. His real name is Eustace. He is a man of his word, and is only stopped from killing Wanda like she wanted by Jared's hunting knife at his neck. Some of his characteristics were influenced by Meyer's younger brother, Seth. Scott Lawrence portrays Doc in the film.

== Other humans ==
Magnolia "Maggie" — Jeb's sister, Sharon's mother, and Melanie and Jamie's aunt. She shows great dislike towards Wanderer and never accepts her, though her attitude softens when Wanderer is moved into Pet's body. She is extremely tough and stubborn.

Sharon — Maggie's daughter, Jeb's niece, and Melanie and Jamie's cousin. Melanie is captured on a trip to Chicago to find Sharon. Melanie remembers Sharon as a fun and vibrant girl in their childhood but the years have been hard on her and she is now cold and bitter. Like her mother, Sharon hates Wanderer and obsesses about the threat she poses, sometimes to the point of risking other priorities. Her dislike weakens when Wanderer is placed in Pet's body. She is in a relationship with Doc. However, the relationship is strained due to Doc's acceptance of Wanderer and Sharon's own prejudice, though she apparently reconciles with him at the end of the book.

Candy — Candy is a human who held the Soul of a Healer, until Doc removed the Soul and placed it in a cryotank. At first, she shows signs of having lost most of her human memories, but she eventually manages to recall her name. Her more vivid memories of her Soul's healing activities allow her to help Doc.

Walter — One of the older humans in the cave, he is slowly dying of cancer. He is very fond of Wanderer and defends her. When he nears his last leg, he grows disoriented and believes that Wanderer is his beloved wife Gladys. Wanderer stays at his bedside until it is time for him to die. Doc euthanizes him and the group holds a funeral for him. It is then that Wanderer comes to believe that the Souls coming to Earth was wrong. Wanderer's caring attitude with Walter helps endear her to the other humans, especially Jared.

Wes — A young human in the caves, he is around 19 years old. He has a crush on Lily despite her being older than him. Lily is initially oblivious of his feelings but eventually enters a relationship with him. When the Seeker attacks the caves, she shoots Wes and kills him. Lily is devastated and his death is the catalyst for Wanderer to reveal her secret of getting a Soul out of a body and leave Melanie's body. When asking Wanda questions in her 'informal class', he is more interested in the way the Souls run the Earth than the Planets to which Wanda has been.

Lacey — The Seeker's host. Lacey is described as an obnoxious whiner and is suspected to be the reason for the Seeker's intemperate attitude. Wanderer removes the Seeker and Lacey is fully restored. Lacey annoys almost everyone with her complaining about life in the caves but is immediately accepted, which slightly upsets the still sometimes shunned Wanderer.

Lucina — A dark-skinned woman who has two young children, Isiah and Freedom. She tries to discourage her children from being around Wanda, though is less resistant after Wanda is placed in Pet's body.

Freedom — Lucina's youngest child, who was delivered by Doc in the caves. He and his brother avoid Melanie even after Wanda is no longer in her body due to their mother's earlier urgings and begin following Wanda affectionately after she is in Pet's body.

Nate — Member of another group of humans that show up at the end of the novel as Wanda is going on her first raid in her new body. He tells Jared about other groups of humans they have encountered.

== Other Souls ==
Pet (Petals Open to the Moon) — She is originally from the Flowers Planet. After Wanda is removed from Melanie, Pet's host body was chosen by Melanie, Jared, and Jamie, to be used for Wanda, believing the body would have no human remnant. Petals Open to the Moon is eventually removed and placed in cryogenic storage to be shipped to another planet. When it appears that Pet's host body has indeed lost all traces of any human mind it had they use the body as a host for Wanderer. Her body is nearly 17 years old at the time she is caught and is small and weak, with pale skin, gray eyes, and wavy blonde hair. Her host body had a mother whose occupying Soul was named Cloud Spinner and Wanda feels remorse about being separated from Cloud due to Pet's lingering memories.

Sunny (Sunlight Passing Through the Ice) — The Soul who inhabits Kyle's girlfriend Jodi's body. Sunny used to be a Bear from the Mist Planet before coming to Earth. She was put in Jodi's body six years previous and began dreaming about Kyle. Upon learning that Wanderer could remove souls, Kyle recklessly raced out to find her and brought her back to the caves. Kyle grows fond of her and when Jodi is not revived, he reinserts Sunny and begins a relationship with her. Sunny is still looking for Jodi inside her head at the end of the book.

Kathy — Wanderer's Comforter in San Diego, who tries to help Wanda cope with Melanie's resistance and powerful emotions. She took the name of her host body and is partners with the Soul occupying her host's human companion. The Seeker interrogates her about Wanda's sessions.

Curt — Wanderer's employer in San Diego and the partner of Kathy. Like Kathy he took the name of his human host. Together they were two of the first Souls to settle on Earth.

Harness Light — A Soul Wanda saved during her time on the Mists Planet. Wanda was going with Harness and another Soul to one of the crystal cities when a claw beast attacked them, cutting the Bear host that Harness was using in two. Harness was placed into the body of the claw beast to save him. When Wanda rode his host body to a facility to be placed in a permanent host it led to her being known by some there as Rides the Beast.

Faces Sunward — One of Wanderer's students in San Diego, who was originally from the planet of the Flowers. He is upset by the stories of the Fire Planet, where similar flower-like creatures are eaten by the Fire Tasters that Souls used on the planet. Wanda later gives his name as that of a Healer as part of a ruse to take medicine from a Healing facility in Tucson.

Burns Living Flowers — A "native" Soul who appears at the end of the novel. Burns has joined a group of humans, like Wanda, and helps other groups of humans they encounter. His host body is described as being that of a large red-haired male. His name indicated that he was once a Fire Taster from the Fire planet, to Wanda's surprise.
