= Mary Brandon =

Mary Brandon may refer to:

- Mary Brandon, Baroness Monteagle (1510 – c.1540), English noblewoman
- Mary Tudor, Queen of France (1496–1533), wife of Charles Brandon
- Mary Brandon, "chorus girl", see Algonquin Round Table
- Mary Martin (née Brandon), founder of Lower Brandon Plantation

== Fictional characters ==
- Mary Alice Brandon, birth name of Alice Cullen, in Twilight
  - The Mary Alice Brandon File, a short film

== See also ==
- Maryann Brandon, American film editor
