= Bad Kitty =

Bad Kitty may refer to:

- Bad Kitty (comics), an American comic book
- Bad Kitty (novel), a 2006 young adult novel by Michele Jaffe
- Bad Kitty (series), a series of American children's books by Nick Bruel
