= Prom Nights from Hell =

2009 horror romance anthology

- First edition
- Author: Meg Cabot, Kim Harrison, Michele Jaffe, Stephenie Meyer and Lauren Myracle
- Genre: Horror/romance
- Publisher: HarperCollins
- Publication date: 2007

Prom Nights from Hell is a 2007 anthology, featuring five young adult horror/romance short stories. The novellas were written respectively by Meg Cabot, Kim Harrison, Michele Jaffe, Stephenie Meyer and Lauren Myracle.

== Stories ==
- "Hell on Earth", by Stephenie Meyer
- "The Exterminator's Daughter", by Meg Cabot
- "The Corsage" (an adaptation of "The Monkey's Paw", by W. W. Jacobs), by Lauren Myracle
- "Madison Avery and the Dim Reaper" (an introduction to the Madison Avery trilogy), by Kim Harrison
- "Kiss and Tell", by Michele Jaffe
