= The Mary Alice Brandon File =

- Directed by: Kailey Spear & Sam Spear
- Screenplay by: Kailey Spear & Sam Spear
- Based on: Twilight by Stephenie Meyer
- Starring: Paloma Kwiatkowski; Eileen Pedde; Michael Hogan
- Cinematography: Graham Talbot; Nelson Talbot
- Music by: Rose Hastreiter
- Release date: July 14, 2015
- Running time: 12 minutes
- Country: United States
- Language: English
- Budget: $50,000

The Mary Alice Brandon File is a 2015 short film created as part of The Storytellers: New Voices of the Twilight Saga short film competition, which it went on to win. It depicts the early life of Alice Cullen, adoptive sister of Edward Cullen.

== Plot ==
In a mental asylum, 19 year-old Mary Alice Brandon is subjected to torturous Electroshock therapy after she was locked up for having visions of the future. While being tortured memories of her family continue to flash through her mind.

== Production ==
Officially produced by Lionsgate, the entire short was filmed in British Columbia, Canada, where most of the actual The Twilight Saga was shot. The Riverview Hospital, Roedde House Museum, and The Segal Building, (500 Granville St, Vancouver) were all used in the film. The special effects were completed by Goldtooth Creative.

== Cast ==
- Paloma Kwiatkowski as Mary Alice Brandon
- Eileen Pedde as The Nurse
- Michael Hogan as The Doctor
- John Emmet Tracy as Edgar John Brandon
- Barbara Beall as Lillian Brandon
- Emma Tremblay as Young Mary Alice Brandon
- Erin Boyes as Anna Marie
- Audrey Smallman as Cynthia Brandon
- Jade Hudema as Strange Man
- Taylor Hickson as Townsfolk #1
- Melita Fawcett as Townsfolk #2
- Jason Stevens as Townsfolk #3
- Jodi Pongratz as Roommate
- Roger Haskett as Town Marshal
- Will Williams as The Groundskeeper
