= Michele Jaffe =

American writer (born 1970)

- Born: Michele Sharon Jaffe; Los Angeles, California, U.S.
- Education: Harvard University (BA, PhD)
- Occupation: Novelist
- Writing career
- Period: 1999–present
- Genres: historical romance, suspense, young adult
- Notable work: Bad Kitty
- Website: www.michelejaffe.com

Michele Sharon Jaffe (born March 20, 1970) is an American writer. She has authored novels in several genres, including historical romance, suspense thrillers, and novels for young adults.

== Early life and education ==
Jaffe was born in Los Angeles, California. She is a 1991 graduate of Harvard University, where she earned a B.A. degree. Jaffe worked at the Huntington Library, an educational and research institution in San Marino, California. She returned to Harvard and in 1998 earned a Ph.D. in comparative literature.

== Writing career ==
After writing a book on the Renaissance, she decided to foray into fiction, starting with a romance novel set in the Renaissance. The debut novel, The Stargazer, was published in 1999, initiating a four-book saga of historical fiction.

Soon afterward, she left the historical sphere, moving to suspense thrillers such as Lover Boy and Bad Girl in 2003.

She then wrote her first Young Adult book, Bad Kitty, published in January 2006, and the following month, it was named Book of the Month in the Meg Cabot Book Club. The next year, she published Kiss and Tell which was included in the anthology Prom Nights from Hell. In 2008, she wrote Kitty Kitty, the sequel of Bad Kitty, and the same year was published its graphic novel, Catnipped. Her latest YA novel is "Rosebush," which was published on December 7, 2010.

Jaffe is friends with bestselling Young Adult author Meg Cabot; they occasionally blogged advice columns together on Cabot's website. Thus persisted until Jaffe got her own Young Adult website. Now, she writes advice blogs on her own site more frequently.

== Personal life ==
Jaffe is divorced, and living in NYC.

== Bibliography ==
=== Historical Novels ===
==== Arboretti Family Saga Series (Romance) ====
1. The Stargazer - 1999
2. The Water Nymph - 2000
3. Lady Killer/Secret Admirer - 2002

=== Contemporary Thrillers of suspense ===
- Lover Boy - 2004
- Bad Girl - 2003

=== Young adult novels ===
==== Bad Kitty Series ====
1. Bad Kitty - 2006
2. Kitty Kitty - 2008

==== Single Novels ====
1. Rosebush - 2010
2. Ghost Flower - 2012
3. Minders - 2014

==== Omnibus in Collaboration ====
- Prom Nights from Hell - 2007 (Exterminator's Daughter by Meg Cabot, Madison Avery and the Dim Reaper by Kim Harrison, Kiss and Tell by Michele Jaffe, Hell on Earth by Stephenie Meyer and The Corsage by Lauren Myracle)

=== Graphic novels ===
==== Bad Kitty Series ====
1. Catnipped - 2008

=== Nonfiction ===
Story of O: Prostitutes and Other Good For Nothings in the Renaissance - 1999
