= Twilight: The Graphic Novel =

Comic book adaptation by Young Kim of the Twilight novel by Stephenie Meyer

- Date: March 16, 2010
- Series: Twilight series
- Page count: Vol-1 224 & Vol-2 240 pages
- Publisher: Yen Press

Creative team
- Writers: Stephenie Meyer, Young Kim
- Artists: Young Kim

Original publication
- Language: English
- ISBN: 9780759529434

Chronology
- Followed by: New Moon: The Graphic Novel

Twilight: The Graphic Novel is a two-part comic book miniseries by Young Kim, an adaptation of the first thirteen chapters of the 2005 novel Twilight by Stephenie Meyer. Volume 2 was released on October 11, 2011. In October 2012 Volume 1 and Volume 2 were put into one book for a collectors edition that included extras in the back of the book about 5 of the characters (Carlisle Cullen, Edward Cullen, Bella Swan, Jacob Black, and Esme Cullen). On April 23, 2013, volume one of the New Moon: The Graphic Novel (the second book in the Twilight series) came out.

== Plot summary ==
The story of Twilight begins with an Isabella "Bella" Swan moving to live with her father Charlie Swan, the Chief of Police, in Forks, Washington.

When Bella was seated next to Edward Cullen in class on her first day of school, Edward seemed repulsed by her. He disappeared for a few days, but warmed up to Bella upon his return. A few days later, Bella was nearly run over by a classmate's van in the school car-park due to ice, but was saved by Edward when he instantaneously appeared next to her and stops the van with his bare hands.

Suspicious, Bella becomes determined to find out how Edward saved her life. After a family friend, Jacob Black, told her the local tribal legends at a party, Bella concluded that Edward and his family are vampires who drink animal blood rather than human. Edward confessed that he initially avoided Bella because the scent of her blood was too desirable to him. However, he admitted his true nature and when Bella was undeterred, they began a relationship.

They began questioning each other about their lives, and Edward decided to show Bella why he and his family couldn't be in the sun. They went hiking, where Edward tried once more to show how dangerous he was as a vampire, but it turned out that neither could stay away from each other, culminating in a kiss. This first part of the novelization ends with Edward taking Bella home.

=== Volume 2 ===
Part 2 begins when Edward Cullen takes Bella Swan home from visiting his family at their house. All of the Cullens are very welcoming to Bella except for Rosalie, who is concerned that the relationship between Edward and Bella may end badly, implicating the entire family and forcing them to move again. However, Edward is very careful not to lose control when he is around Bella, and their relationship continues to grow. The relationship is disturbed when another vampire coven arrives in Forks. James, a tracker vampire who is intrigued by the Cullens' relationship with a human, wants to hunt Bella for sport. The Cullens attempt to distract the tracker by splitting up Bella and Edward, and Bella is sent to hide in a hotel in Phoenix. There, she receives a phone call from James, who claims to be holding her mother captive. When Bella surrenders herself, James attacks her. Before James can kill her, Edward, along with the other Cullens, rescues her and defeats James. Once they realize that James has bitten Bella's hand, Edward successfully sucks the poison from her bloodstream and prevents her from becoming a vampire, after which she is brought to a hospital. Upon returning to Forks, Bella and Edward attend their school prom and Bella expresses her desire to become a vampire, but Edward refuses.

== Reception ==
The comic's first printing was reported to be of 350,000 copies, according to USA Today, was believed to be the largest first printing for a graphic novel in the U.S. market. A typical first printing for a graphic novel is between 20,000 and 25,000 copies. Yen Press announced that the book sold 66,000 copies in its first week, which it claimed was a record for U.S. sales of a graphic novel in its first week.

As of June 10, 2010, the Twilight graphic novel was at #1 on the New York Times best-seller list for hardcover graphic books in its 12th week on the chart.

Nick Smith of ICv2 gave the book a rating of 5 out of 5 stars, writing, "The romantic nature of the story is emphasized, and the artistic style used will be very attractive to the same audience which devoured the novel." Ronald S. Lim of the Manila Bulletin wrote, "While the graphic novel isn't lacking any visual flair, it does struggle to tell a fascinating enough story when it comes to the plot. ... This isn't exactly Kim's fault, but more of Meyer's. Twilight, as a novel, is not replete with action." Chris Sims of ComicsAlliance wrote that "Kim does a fantastic job" with the art, but the lettering "hits new lows. It is garbage. Even if you can get past the fact that they lettered an entire graphic novel in Times New Roman — which I assume was a choice meant to make it look more like a novel and less like a comic — they still managed to get everything wrong."
