= The Host (2013 film) =

2013 film by Andrew Niccol

- Theatrical release poster
- Directed by: Andrew Niccol
- Screenplay by: Andrew Niccol
- Based on: The Host by Stephenie Meyer
- Produced by: Nick Wechsler; Steve Schwartz; Paula Mae Schwartz; Stephenie Meyer
- Starring: Saoirse Ronan; Jake Abel; Max Irons; Frances Fisher; Chandler Canterbury; Diane Kruger; William Hurt
- Cinematography: Roberto Schaefer
- Edited by: Thomas J. Nordberg
- Music by: Antonio Pinto
- Production companies: IAV International; Silver Reel; Nick Wechsler Productions; Chockstone Pictures
- Distributed by: Open Road Films
- Release date: March 29, 2013
- Running time: 125 minutes
- Country: United States
- Language: English
- Budget: $40 million
- Box office: $63.3 million

The Host is a 2013 American romantic science fiction thriller film written for the screen and directed by Andrew Niccol, based on the 2008 novel by Stephenie Meyer. The film stars Saoirse Ronan, Jake Abel, Max Irons, Frances Fisher, Chandler Canterbury, Diane Kruger, and William Hurt. It tells the story of a young woman, Melanie, who is captured after the human race has been taken over by parasitic aliens called "Souls". After Melanie is infused with a "Soul" called "Wanderer", Melanie and the alien "Soul" vie for control of her body.

The Host was released theatrically in the United States on March 29, 2013, by Open Road Films. The film underperformed at the box office, grossing a worldwide total of $63.3 million against a $40 million production budget, and received unfavorable reviews from critics.

== Plot ==
Small parasitic aliens called "Souls", who travel to planets inserting themselves into a host body of that planet's dominant species while suppressing the host's consciousness, have taken over the human race. Deeming humans too violent to deserve the planet, they have now almost successfully conquered Earth. The original owner's consciousness is erased, but the Souls can access the host's memories, and occupied hosts are identifiable by silver rings in their eyes.

A human on the run, Melanie Stryder, is captured and infused with a Soul called "Wanderer", whom a "Seeker" soul has asked to access Melanie's memories and learn the location of a pocket of unassimilated humans. Melanie's consciousness has not been eliminated; she and Wanderer carry out an internal conversation and debate with each other, eventually becoming friends.

Wanderer tells Seeker that Melanie was traveling with her brother, Jamie, and her boyfriend, Jared Howe, to find Melanie's uncle Jeb in the desert. Wanderer admits that Melanie is still present, so Seeker decides to be transferred into Melanie's body to get the information herself and will subsequently terminate Melanie. With Melanie’s guidance, Wanderer escapes to the desert, where Jeb finds her and takes her to a series of caves inside a mountain where the humans (including Jared and Jamie) are hiding.

Wanderer's presence is met with hostility by all but Jeb and Jamie. Melanie instructs Wanderer not to tell anyone she is still alive, since it would provoke them, though she later allows her to tell Jamie. Wanderer begins interacting with the humans and slowly starts gaining their trust, bonding with Ian O'Shea.

Seeker leads a search party into the desert. They intercept one of the shelter's supply teams, and in the ensuing chase, Aaron and Brandt commit suicide to avoid capture. During the chase, Seeker accidentally kills another Soul, leading her superiors to call off the search.

Jared and Kyle move to kill Wanderer, causing Jamie to reveal that Melanie's consciousness is alive. Jeb and Ian accept this, but Jared refuses to believe it until he strategically kisses Wanderer, provoking Melanie to take back control and slap him, proving to Jared that she is still alive. Kyle tries to kill Wanderer but endangers his own life, and Wanderer ends up saving him. Ian believes that Kyle attacked Wanderer and tells her he has feelings for her. Wanderer admits that Melanie's body is compelled to love Jared, but she has feelings of her own, and the two kiss.

Wanderer enters the community's medical facility and is shocked to discover that Doc has been experimenting with ways to remove Souls and allow the host's mind to regain control, resulting in the deaths of many Souls and hosts. After isolating herself for several days, Wanderer learns that Jamie is critically ill with an infection in his leg. She infiltrates a Soul medical facility to steal some alien medicine, saving Jamie's life.

Seeker has continued looking for Wanderer on her own, but Jeb captures her. Wanderer offers to show Doc how to properly remove Souls, on the condition that he later remove her from Melanie's body. Doc uses the technique to remove Seeker from her host, with both host and Soul surviving. Wanderer takes Seeker’s tiny alien form to a Soul space-travel site, where she sends it so far from Earth that it can not return for numerous generations.

Tired of the many lives she's lived and finding it too painful to leave everyone behind, Wanderer makes Doc promise to let her die when she is removed and not tell anyone. The others in the shelter intervene with Doc, who inserts Wanderer into a brain-dead human body, after the Soul inside her was removed. Now with a body of her own, Wanderer is able to be with Ian, while Melanie reunites with Jared.

A few months later, while on a supply run, Wanderer, Melanie, Ian and Jared are captured. They discover that their captors are humans, who reveal that there are several other human groups as well. They also learn that a Soul with this group has sided with the human resistance, as Wanderer has, and they may not be the last Souls to do so.

== Cast ==
- Saoirse Ronan as Melanie "Mel" Stryder / Wanderer "Wanda"
- Jake Abel as Ian O'Shea
- Max Irons as Jared Howe
- Frances Fisher as Magnolia "Maggie"
- Chandler Canterbury as Jamie Stryder
- Diane Kruger as Seeker / Lacey
- William Hurt as Jebediah
- Boyd Holbrook as Kyle
- Scott Lawrence as Doc
- Rachel Roberts as Soul Fleur
- Shawn Carter Peterson as Wes
- Lee Hardee as Aaron
- Phil Austin as Seeker Waverly
- Raeden Greer as Lily
- J. D. Evermore as Trevor Stryder
- Emily Browning as Pet / Wanderer "Wanda" (uncredited)
- Mustafa Harris as Brandt
- Bokeem Woodbine as Nate
- Alex Russell as Seeker Burns

== Production ==
Producers Nick Wechsler, Steve Schwartz, and Paula Mae Schwartz acquired the film rights to The Host in September 2009, but Open Road Films later acquired the film rights, and made Stephenie Meyer, Nick Wechsler, Steve Schwartz, and Paula Mae Schwartz the main producers. Andrew Niccol was hired to write the screenplay and to direct the film. In February 2011, Susanna White was hired to replace Niccol as director, but he later resumed the role in May 2011.

Saoirse Ronan was also cast in May as Melanie Stryder and Wanderer. On June 27, the release date was set for the film for March 29, 2013, and it was also announced that principal photography would begin in February 2012, in Louisiana and New Mexico.

== Music ==
A soundtrack album titled "The Host: Choose to Listen" was released by Interscope records, it featured ten tracks, including The Dirty Tees’ remix of Imagine Dragons’ song "Radioactive" (which was used in the trailer and end-credits) as well as music from Ellie Goulding, Skylar Grey, and X Ambassadors. A score album featuring the music of Antonio Pinto was also released.

== Release ==
Distributed by Open Road Films, the film was released theatrically on March 29, 2013. The Host was released on DVD and Blu-ray on July 9, 2013.

== Reception ==
=== Box office ===
The film grossed $63.3 million worldwide, of which $26.6 million was from North America, and $36.7 million from other territories. It opened at #6 at the US box office, and for its opening weekend grossed $10,600,112; screened at 3,202 theaters it averaged $3,310 per theater.

=== Critical response ===
On the review aggregator website Rotten Tomatoes, 10% of 134 critics' reviews are positive, with an average rating of 3.60/10. The website's consensus reads: "Poorly scripted and dramatically ineffective, The Host is mostly stale and tedious, with moments of unintentional hilarity." On Metacritic, the film has a weighted average score of 35 out of 100, based on 28 critics, indicating "generally unfavorable reviews". Audiences polled by CinemaScore gave the film a grade of "B−" on a scale of A+ to F.

Manohla Dargis of The New York Times gave the film an unfavorable review, calling it "a brazen combination of unoriginal science-fiction themes, young-adult pandering and bottom-line calculation". Todd McCarthy of The Hollywood Reporter felt that "it's cloaked in yawningly familiar teen-romance terms and cries out for even a little seasoning of wit, irreverence, political smarts and genre twists that, given the well-trod terrain, seem like requisites when presenting visions of the near future." Noah Berlatsky of The Atlantic wrote: "The acting, as well as Andrew Niccol's writing and direction, are all awful; I can't in good conscience recommend that anyone see this film."

Roth Cornet of IGN gave it a "mediocre" score of 5 out of 10, stating that the film is "unintentionally laughable" and "frustratingly absurd". Cornet said that it could have made an interesting story but that the contradictions of the peaceful but parasitic Souls were not fully explained, in the case of the character Seeker only given a shallow unsatisfying explanation. She praised Ronan for her performance and blamed a "fundamentally flawed" script. Ben Kenigsberg of Time Out magazine blamed the source material, crediting Niccol for making the best of it, but primarily blaming the high-definition video cinematography, saying it makes "what once would have been a lush, grand-scale blockbuster appear cheap and televisual."

The Host was the penultimate film to be reviewed by film critic Roger Ebert before his death on April 4, 2013, and the last major film review to be published in his lifetime. He rated the film 2.5 out of 4 stars, saying "The Host is top-heavy with profound, sonorous conversations, all tending to sound like farewells. The movie is so consistently pitched at the same note, indeed, that the structure robs it of possibilities for dramatic tension."

=== Accolades ===
Saoirse Ronan was nominated for a Teen Choice Award for her performance in The Host, under the category "Choice Movie Actress: Sci-fi/Fantasy", but lost to Kristen Stewart for her performance in The Twilight Saga: Breaking Dawn – Part 2.

== See also ==
- Invasion of the Body Snatchers
- Twilight (series)
- Parasyte
- Animorphs
