= Jake Abel =

American actor

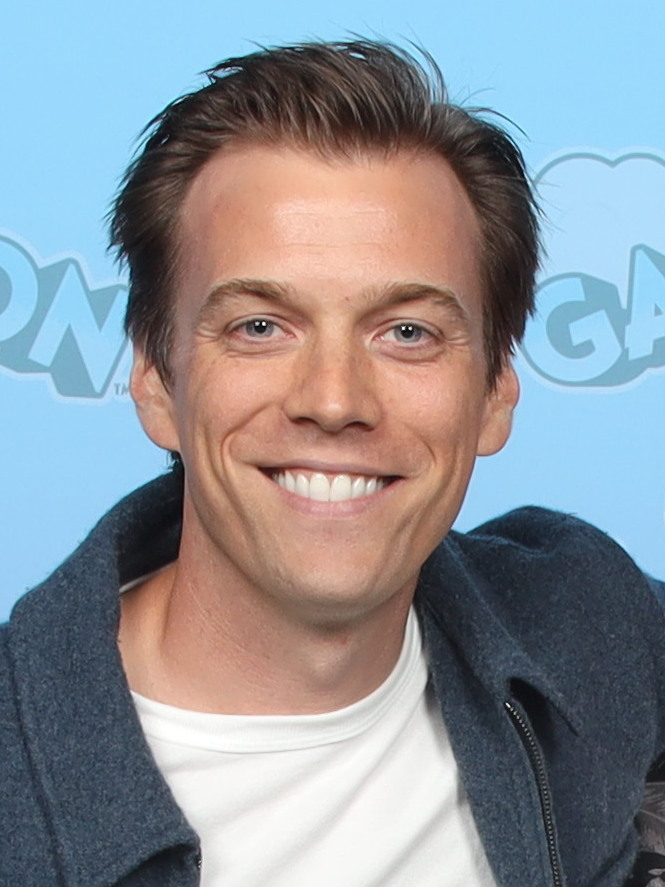
- Abel at GalaxyCon Oklahoma City in 2024
- Born: Jacob Allen Abel; November 18, 1987 (age 38); Canton, Ohio, U.S.
- Occupation: Actor
- Years active: 2005–present
- Spouse: Allie Wood (m. 2013)
- Children: 2

Jacob Allen Abel (born November 18, 1987) is an American actor. He has appeared in the film adaptations of the young adult novels Percy Jackson (2010–2013), I Am Number Four (2011), and The Host (2013), along with portraying musician Mike Love in the biographical drama Love & Mercy (2014). Outside of film, he appeared in the recurring role of Adam Milligan on the CW series Supernatural (2009–2010; 2019–2020). Abel was also a series regular in the first season of the Netflix science fiction drama Another Life (2019).

== Career ==
His first credited role was in the Disney Channel Original Movie Go Figure, playing Spencer. He later had a recurring guest role on CBS's short lived science fiction series, Threshold. He had numerous guest starring roles including Cold Case and ER. He was honored with a Rising Star award at the 16th Hamptons International Film Festival in October 2008 for his work in the film Flash of Genius. In 2009, Abel shortly appeared in the Peter Jackson film The Lovely Bones based on Alice Sebold's novel. He also had a regular role in the web series Angel of Death which ran for 10 episodes.

In February 2009, Abel was cast in The CW hit series Supernatural playing Adam Milligan, half-brother to series protagonists Dean and Sam Winchester; and appearing in three episodes as both Adam and the Archangel Michael possessing Adam. In 2010, Abel had a role in the film adaptation of Percy Jackson & the Olympians: The Lightning Thief playing Luke Castellan which released on February 12, 2010 (later returning in the sequel, Percy Jackson & the Olympians: The Sea of Monsters, which was released on August 7, 2013). Afterward in 2011, Abel starred in the live-action film I Am Number Four playing Mark James. Abel starred on the social thriller film Inside co-starred by Emmy Rossum which release on July 25, 2011. He also appeared on ABC's medical drama Grey's Anatomy in the episode "Poker Face", playing Tyler Moser.

In 2012, Abel was chosen to play Ian O'Shea in the film adaptation of The Host (2013), based on Stephenie Meyer's eponymous novel.

Abel reprised his role on Supernatural on the eighth and nineteenth episodes of the fifteenth and final season.

Abel was cast as the audiobook voice narrator for Midnight Sun, published by Stephenie Meyer on August 4, 2020.

In November 2022 it was confirmed that Abel would be joining the cast of Walker, reuniting with Jared Padalecki. His character, Kevin, made his first appearance in episode 6 of season 3.

== Personal life ==
On November 9, 2013, Abel married writer Allie Wood. They released an album together, Black Magic, in March 2013. They suffered a stillbirth in November 2019. They have two sons, born in 2021 and 2023.

== Filmography ==
=== Film ===
Year	Title	Role	Notes
2008	Strange Wilderness	Conservationist	
2008	Tru Loved	Trevor	
2008	Flash of Genius	Dennis (21 Years)	
2009	The Lovely Bones	Brian Nelson	
2010	Percy Jackson & the Olympians: The Lightning Thief	Luke Castellan	Nominated — MTV Movie Award for Best Fight; Nominated — Teen Choice Award for Best Fight
2011	I Am Number Four	Mark James	
2011	Inside	Kirk Francis	
2013	The Host	Ian O'Shea	
2013	Percy Jackson: Sea of Monsters	Luke Castellan	
2014	Against the Sun	Gene Aldrich	
2014	Good Kill	M.I.C. Joseph Zimmer	
2014	Love & Mercy	Mike Love	
2016	Almost Friends	Jack	
2018	Shrimp	Daniel	Short film
2019	An Affair to Die For	Everett	
2020	Son of the South	Doc	
2021	Malignant	Derek Mitchell	
2025	Fog of War	Gene Lewis	
TBA	Unspoken		

=== Television ===
Year	Title	Role	Notes
2005–2006	Threshold	Brian Janklow	3 episodes
2005	Go Figure	Spencer	TV movie
2006	The Suite Life of Zack & Cody	Kirk	Episode: Twins at the Tipton
2006	Cold Case	Doug Sommer	Episode: Saving Sammy
2007	CSI: Miami	Charlie Sheridan	Episode: Stand Your Ground
2008	Life	Tate McNeil	Episode: Not for Nothing
2009	CSI: NY	Kyle Sheridan	Episode: Rush to Judgement
2009	ER	Dylan	Episode: A Long, Strange Trip
2009–2020	Supernatural	Adam Milligan/Michael	5 episodes
2011	Grey's Anatomy	Tyler Moser	Episode: Poker Face
2018	Dirty John	Trey Newell	3 episodes
2019	Another Life	Sasha Harrison	Main role
2022–2023	Walker	Kevin Golden	8 episodes

=== Web series ===
Year	Title	Role	Notes
2009	Angel of Death	Cameron Downes	

=== Audiobook narration/Voice talent ===
Year	Title	Role	Notes
2020	Midnight Sun by Stephenie Meyer (audiobook)	Edward Cullen	
