= The Storytellers: New Voices of the Twilight Saga =

2015 American film

- Based on: Twilight series by Stephenie Meyer
- Produced by: Stephenie Meyer (1–7)
- Distributed by: Facebook (1–7)
- Release date: July 14, 2015
- Running time: 75 minutes (1–7, combined cuts)
- Country: United States
- Language: English

The Storytellers: New Voices of the Twilight Saga is a series of seven romance-fantasy short films from Lionsgate and Stephenie Meyer inspired by the vampiric world established in Meyer's four novels. It began as a competition to bring more attention to Women in Film.

== Competition ==
On October 1, 2014, Stephenie Meyer, Lionsgate, Tongal, Facebook, Volvo, and Women in Film, announced a new competition designed to get women involved in the entertainment industry, and give them "the attention they deserve". Fans of the series were invited to vote on which characters they would like to see explored in the series of shorts. Contestants were to pick characters from the universe, and write 5-10 minute long screenplay outlines centered around the character(s) they chose. A board of unbiased judges then were to review the outlines and choose their top 20. The outlines were judged on their central character, originality, ability to translate to a 5-10 minute film, and the number of votes each outline received in the voting period for the judges. These writers would than each receive a $500 prize, and were to complete their screenplays for the next phase of the competition.

The top 20 finalists moved on to phase 3 of the competition where they all had to write 4-15 page screenplays based on their outlines, and the judges would determine the top 5 screenplays. The top five finalists would were each awarded $3,000. The screenplays were judged on their central character, quality of dialogue, and ability to evoke an emotional response. The fourth phase of the competition was the directorial pitch, female filmmakers were to submit a pitch convincing the judges why they should be chosen to direct one of the scripts that were picked. They were judged on their originality, potential to create a short film worthy of conversation and number of votes obtained during the Director Voting Period. The chosen directors were given $50,000 in production funding, after their budget was approved, once cleared production began.

Other contestants were still welcome to enter as a wildcard. They were to choose one of the characters voted on in phase one, and independently make a short to submit. The wildcard winner, along with the five winning short films were evaluated by the judges in consideration for the grand prize $100,000, a chance to shadow a director, and an all new 2015 Volvo XC90. Each runner up was awarded $5,000, in addition to other prizes.

== Films ==
=== The Mary Alice Brandon File ===
The Mary Alice Brandon File was written and directed by Kailey and Sam Spear. The film follows Alice Cullen as a human, while she was locked up and tortured in a mental asylum. The short was the grand prize winner for the competition.

=== Consumed ===
Consumed was directed by Maja Fernqvist, and written by Cullyn & Megan L. Reese. The short film follows twins Jane and Alec as humans, showing a sweeter, softer side of them before they were transformed into vampires by Aro, one of the three leaders of the Volturi coven.

=== The Groundskeeper ===
The Groundskeeper was directed by Nicole Eckenroad and written by Sarah Turi. The film follows the groundskeeper of the mental asylum Alice is imprisoned in, trying to help her escape from two newborn vampires who are trying to kill her.

=== Masque ===
Masque was the wildcard submission, directed by Cate Carson and written by Cate Carson & Mary Kehoe. The film explores the origin story of Esme Cullen, focusing on the time after her transformation into a vampire and her struggles to withstand her craving for human blood. While facing these challenges her tragedy-stricken past rises to the surface. With Carlisle by her side, she confronts the memories of her abusive ex-husband in the form of a powerful socialite and overcomes with the saving grace of her brief motherhood.

=== Sunrise ===
Sunrise was directed by Amanda Tasse and written by Alanna Smith. The film follows Egyptian vampire Benjamin as he is torn away from his one true love, when he is turned into a vampire.

=== Turncoats ===
Turncoats was written and directed by Lindsey Hancock Williamson. The film follows Carlisle Cullen during his time as a soldier in the American Revolutionary War.

=== We've Met Before! ===
We've Met Before! was written and directed by Yulin Kuang. The short film follows Alice after she has her first vision of Jasper which starts her on her journey to the diner from her vision to wait for him.

== Reaction ==
When the short films debuted on Facebook July 14, 2015, people were ecstatic. The videos racked up hundreds of thousands of views, likes, and comments. The shorts were praised for their "...dark and twisted..." take on the source material.
