= Bad Kitty (novel) =

2006 young adult novel by Michele Jaffe

- First edition
- Author: Michele Jaffe
- Language: English
- Publisher: HarperTeen
- Publication date: 2006
- Publication place: United States
- Media type: Print
- Pages: 304
- ISBN: 0-06-078110-6
- Followed by: Kitty Kitty

Bad Kitty is a 2006 young adult novel written by Michele Jaffe. It is about a would-be girl detective and her friends. The sequel to Bad Kitty is Kitty Kitty.

== Plot summary ==
Jasmine Callihan is a 17-year-old girl on vacation in Las Vegas with her family. She is spending her vacation trying to avoid her cousin Alyson and her "Evil Hench Twin" Veronique, get the 'cute guy across the pool', Jack, to notice her, and prove to her father that she is a model daughter. However, as soon as she is attacked by a three-legged cat (Mean and Dangerous Joe, or Mad Joe for short), things go haywire. She is suddenly caught up in a mystery regarding the murder of Len Phillips, and is determined to solve it with her best friends, fashion-wise Polly, crazy and eccentric Roxy, and Tom, sensible and totally in love with Polly. Along the way, she gets to know the 'cute guy across the pool', who may or may not be involved with the murder.

It is a typical afternoon by the pool at the Venetian Hotel. Jas is feeling listless and frustrated. Her cousin Alyson is being her obnoxious and snotty self. Her overprotective father coos with his twenty-years-younger wife and clearly has no intention of letting Jas follow her dream—a career as a detective any time soon.

The cat incident leads to Jas's first run-in with hotel security and her introduction to the cat's owner, the eight-year-old son of Fiona Bristol. Fiona is a famous model who was embroiled in scandal a year earlier when her lover was killed and her husband was arrested for the murder. Jas's three best friends, including a boy named Tom, who is crushing on Jasmine, sense she needs help and show up to offer insight into the case and fashion advice. When the cute guy at the snack hut turns out to be deeply enmeshed in the case, Jas has to figure out whether he is a friend or a foe.

== Characters ==
Jasmine Callihan is the main protagonist in the novel, which follows her point of view. She gets dragged into the mystery by the cat. Her friends crash the vacation, and even though she tries to be serious, she always seems to end up laughing. She has an incredible ability to be at the wrong place, at the wrong time without fail. She thinks cats like her. She is half-Irish, half-Jamaican, and she is very tall. She is in love with Jack but thinks that he is the bad guy just because he threatened her twice. She is actually very smart and number two in her class. She has dedicated her life to being a young detective ever since her mother died.

Jasmine's Father is one of the antagonists, also known as the Thwarter. He "crushes the bold, girlish dreams" of his daughter Jasmine. He is very overprotective. He wears khaki safari suits all the time, but during the book he wears safari suits with shorts. He married Sherri! after Jasmine's mom died. Jas describes him as a genius who thinks differently from other people.

Sherri! is Jasmine's stepmother. Her "superpower" is to be unhateable, and she works as a double for movie stars. She dreams of inventing a line of comfortable seatbelts for small dogs. Jas describes her as the kind of stepmom you could not hate.

Polly Prentis is Jasmine's best friend. A typical, really pretty California girl, all long blonde hair and blue eyes and skinny tanned limbs. She is very into fashion, but she is a "germaphobe" and carries a BeDazzler everywhere she goes. Her car is a van called the Pink Pearl. It is, as the name suggests, pink, with fake diamonds around the windows and shag carpeting in the back. She dates a less cute, less cool version of Tom who likes her. She does not believe in love, and her only sign of intimacy is air kisses. She and Tom become an item at the near end of the story.

Roxy Hernandez is one of Jasmine's best friends. She has a twin brother named Tom. Her mom and dad had both been telenovela stars. She was one of those people who men turn around in their seats to look at. She crushes on and dates weird freaky guys while oblivious to the infatuation of the guys going to her brother's school. She can eat more food faster than anyone Jas has seen, has a perfect sense of direction and over one spring break built a working TV out of an old toaster.

Tom Hernandez is Jasmine's only guy friend and the twin brother of Roxy. He is in love with Polly. A complete gentleman, the captain of the Medford Boys School water polo team, and the number-one crush for everyone at Jas's all-girls school. Jas describes him as Antonio Banderas times ten. He is actually funny, smart, romantic, and cutely shy around most girls.

== Reception ==
Critical reception for Bad Kitty was mostly positive, with Publishers Weekly praising the book's characters. School Library Journal wrote that "the story is somewhat convoluted and often defies credulity", but also praised the book's characters. Booklist called the character of Jas "likable, quick-witted, and extremely funny". Kirkus Reviews stated that although "the protagonist’s voice... sometimes grates", it is "paradoxically the book’s greatest asset".

== Sequels ==
Bad Kitty was followed up by the 2008 release of Kitty Kitty as well as a graphic novel series called Bad Kitty: Catnipped, which was released by TokyoPop.
