= Stephenie Meyer =

American novelist (born 1973)

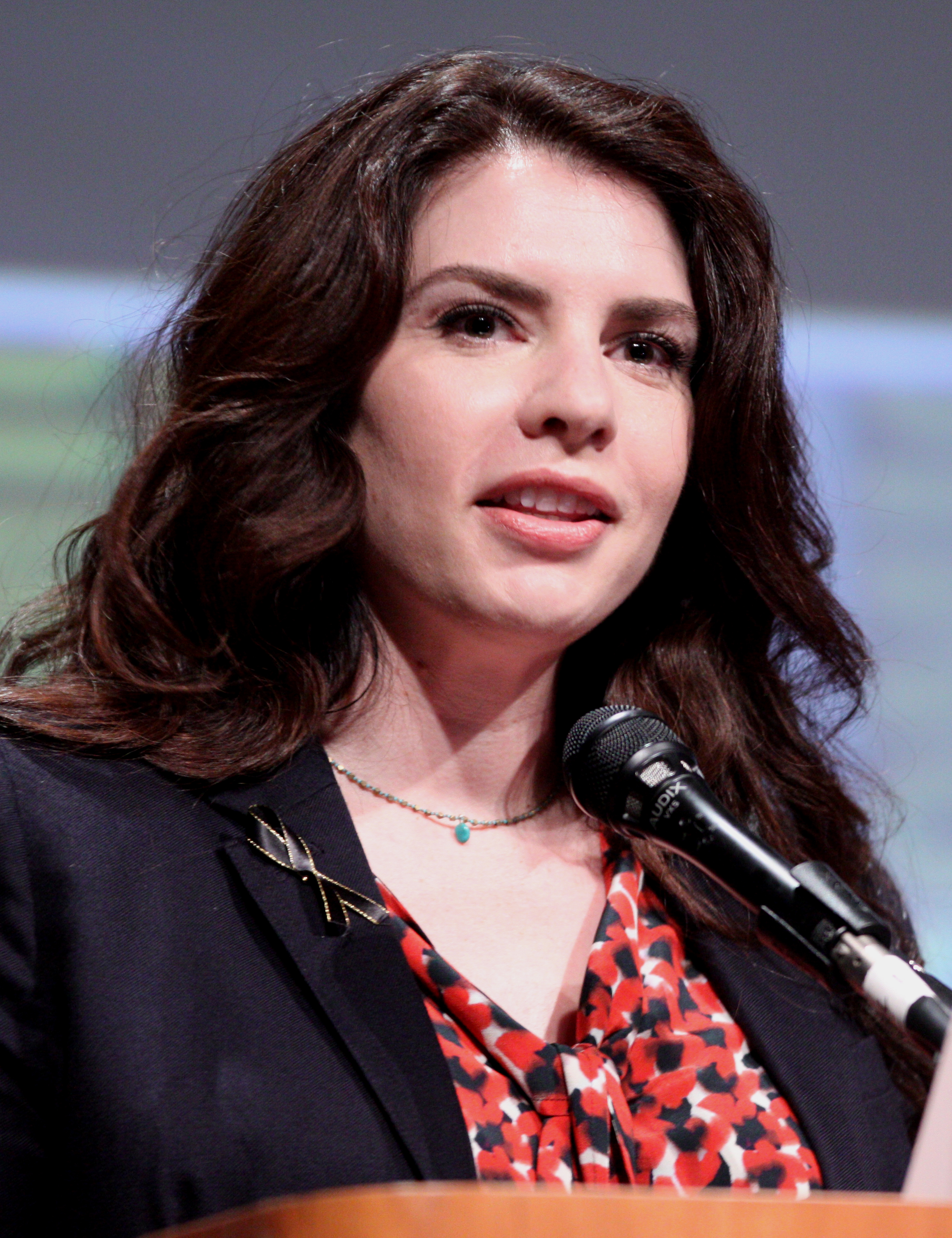
- Meyer in 2012
- Born: Stephenie Morgan; December 24, 1973 (age 52); Hartford, Connecticut, U.S.
- Education: Brigham Young University (BA)
- Occupations: Novelist; film producer
- Spouse: Christian Meyer (m. 1994)
- Children: 3
- Writing career
- Genres: Vampire romance, young adult fiction, science fiction
- Website: stepheniemeyer.com

Stephenie Meyer (/ˈmaɪ.ər/; née Morgan; born December 24, 1973) is an American novelist and film producer. She wrote the vampire romance series Twilight, which has sold over 160 million copies, with translations in 37 different languages. She was the bestselling author of 2008 and 2009 in the United States, having sold over 29 million books in 2008 and 26.5 million in 2009.

An avid young reader, Meyer attended Brigham Young University, marrying at the age of 21 before graduating with a degree in English literature in 1997. Having no prior experience as an author, she conceived the idea for the Twilight series in a dream. Influenced by the work of Jane Austen and William Shakespeare, she wrote Twilight soon afterwards. After many rejections, Little, Brown and Company offered her a $750,000 three-book deal which led to a four-book series, two spin-off novels, a novella, and a series of commercially successful film adaptations. Aside from young adult novels, Meyer has ventured into adult novels with The Host (2008) and The Chemist (2016). She has worked in film production and co-founded production company Fickle Fish Films, producing both parts of Breaking Dawn, the Twilight film series' finale, and two other novel adaptations.

Meyer's membership in the Church of Jesus Christ of Latter-day Saints shaped her novels. Themes consistent with Meyer's religion, including agency, mortality, temptation, and eternal life, are prominent in her work. Critics have called Meyer's writing style overly simplistic, but her stories have received praise, and she has acquired a fan following.

Meyer was included on Time magazine's list of the top 100 most influential people in 2008 and Forbes's list of the top 100 most powerful celebrities in 2009, with her annual earnings exceeding $50 million.

== Early and personal life ==
Stephenie Morgan was born on December 24, 1973, in Hartford, Connecticut, United States, the second of six children born to financial officer Stephen Morgan and homemaker Candy Morgan. She was raised in Phoenix, Arizona, and attended Chaparral High School in Scottsdale. In 1992, Meyer won a National Merit Scholarship, which helped fund her undergraduate studies at Brigham Young University (BYU) in Provo, Utah, where she received a Bachelor of Arts degree in English literature in 1997. Although she began and finished her degree at BYU, Meyer took classes at Arizona State University in fall 1996 and spring 1997.

She met her future husband, Christian (Note: Spelled Christiaan in some sources.) "Pancho" Meyer, in Arizona when they were both children. The couple married in 1994 and have three sons, born 1997, 2001, and 2003. Christian retired from his job as an auditor to take care of their children full time.

Before writing her first novel, Twilight, Meyer considered going to law school because she felt that she had no chance of becoming a writer. Meyer later said that the birth of her oldest son, Gabe, in 1997 changed her mind: "Once I had Gabe, I just wanted to be his mom." Before becoming an author, Meyer's only professional work was as a receptionist at a property company.

== The Twilight series ==
=== The Twilight novels ===
According to Meyer, the idea for Twilight came to her in a dream on June 2, 2003, about a human girl and a vampire who was in love with her but thirsted for her blood. Based on this dream, Meyer wrote the draft of what became chapter 13 of the book. She wrote from chapter 13 to the end of the novel and then backfilled the first 12 chapters, in secret, without an ideal audience in mind or the intention to publish the novel. Meyer researched the Quileute Native Americans to include their legends and traditions in the novel, though some Quileute tribe members found her use of their legends offensive. Meyer joined the American Night Writers Association (ANWA) for aspiring Latter-day Saint female writers. She completed the novel in three months. Her sister's response to the book was enthusiastic, and she persuaded Meyer to send the manuscript to literary agencies.

Of the 15 letters she wrote, five went unanswered, nine brought rejections, and the last was a positive response from Jodi Reamer of Writers House. Eight publishers competed for the rights to publish Twilight in a 2003 auction. By November, Meyer had signed a $750,000 three-book deal with Little, Brown and Company. Twilight was published in 2005 with a print run of 75,000 copies. Bimonthly book signings and events at the Changing Hands Bookstore in Tempe, Arizona, early in her writing career helped cultivate her fanbase. Twilight reached No. 5 on The New York Times Best Seller list for Children's Chapter Books within a month of its release, and later rose to #1. The novel was named the Publishers Weekly Best Book of the Year and a New York Times Editor's Choice. Despite its success, Twilight was one of the most challenged books of 2009 according to the American Library Association for being sexually explicit, age-inappropriate, and for religious views; some schools and libraries were asked to remove the books from their shelves.

Upon publishing Twilight, Meyer had already outlined a story for a sequel. However, her publisher insisted that she follow Twilight with two sequels following Bella and Edward in college. Consequently, Meyer expanded the story into a series with three more books: New Moon (2006), Eclipse (2007), and Breaking Dawn (2008). The original story she pitched for the sequel would later be published in Breaking Dawn. Meanwhile, Meyer wrote a short story, "Hell on Earth", about demons at prom night, which was published in April 2007 in Prom Nights from Hell, a collection of stories about bad prom nights with supernatural effects. Meyer's fans urged her to expand "Hell on Earth" into a full novel, but Meyer was occupied finishing Eclipse.

In its first week after publication, New Moon reached No. 5 on The New York Times Best Seller list for Children's Chapter Books, and in its second week rose to the No. 1 position, where it remained for the next 11 weeks. In total, it spent over 50 weeks on the list. In May 2007, Meyer held two promotional prom events at an Arizona State University gymnasium to celebrate the special edition release of New Moon and the release of Eclipse. For the event, Meyer wore a blood-red evening gown and signed over 1,000 books. Meyer's red dress was later auctioned for $5,500 at a fundraiser for a book seller's battle with breast cancer called Project Book Babe.

After the release of Eclipse, the first three "Twilight" books spent a combined 143 weeks on The New York Times Best Seller list. The fourth installment of the Twilight series, Breaking Dawn, was released with an initial print run of 3.7 million copies. Over 1.3 million copies were sold on the first day. The novel won Meyer a British Book Award for Children's Book of the Year, despite competition from J. K. Rowling's The Tales of Beedle the Bard. In 2009, Meyer faced plagiarism accusations for Breaking Dawn. Author of The Nocturne, Jordan Scott, claimed the circumstances around Bella's supernatural pregnancy and subsequent transformation into a vampire were similar to the storyline of her novel and indicated that Meyer plagiarized the plot of The Nocturne. Meyer dismissed the accusation, claiming she had not heard of the writer nor the novel. Scott failed to produce a copy of the novel to support her accusation; The Nocturne is not available on Amazon and is listed as "temporarily sold out" on her website.

The series has sold over 100 million copies worldwide in 37 languages. In 2008, the four Twilight books were in the top four spots on USA Today's year-end bestseller list. Meyer was the bestselling author of 2008 and the first author to have books in all four of the top-selling spots. The Twilight novels held the top four spots on USA Today's year-end list again in 2009. The success of the Twilight series has been attributed to the Internet, which allowed Meyer to directly reach out to her fans, leading the series to be called "the first social networking bestseller". According to scholar Lykke Guanio-Uluru, the Twilight series "popularized and helped redefine, the paranormal romance subgenre".

=== Twilight saga films ===
In 2004, Paramount's MTV Films and Maverick Films optioned Twilight before the book was published in order to maximize its potential profits. The written script deviated greatly from the novel. However, the film was put into turnaround. In 2006, Erik Feig, president of Summit Entertainment, attempted to make a deal with Meyer by assuring her that the film would be true to the novel and that "no vampire character [would] be depicted with canine or incisor teeth longer or more pronounced than may be found in human beings". In 2007, the rights were sold to Summit Entertainment. Catherine Hardwicke was chosen to direct the film, and Melissa Rosenberg wrote the new script. Kristen Stewart was cast first as Bella Swan, and Robert Pattinson was cast as Edward Cullen after an audition with Stewart and Pattinson revealed they had good chemistry. Taylor Lautner was cast in the role of Jacob Black. Released on November 21, 2008, the film received favorable reviews; Roger Ebert called the film, "lush and beautiful" and Peter Bradshaw said it was, "wildly enjoyable". The film was a box-office success and became the fourth-highest-grossing November opening weekend release up to that time. Meyer makes a brief cameo appearance in a diner scene. The same year, Meyer began her work in film with a Jack's Mannequin music video "The Resolution", which she co-directed with Noble Jones.

Following the success of Twilight, Summit greenlit a film adaptation of the sequel, The Twilight Saga: New Moon. Each novel adaptation was headed by a different director. Chris Weitz directed New Moon, which was released on November 20, 2009. On opening night, New Moon broke the record for the highest single-day domestic gross on opening day, which had previously been set by Harry Potter and the Half-Blood Prince. Despite its commercial success, the film received poor reviews; Roger Ebert criticized the slow pace of the film, and Tim Robey of The Telegraph similarly said, "the movie gives us all the requisite looks of tortured longing, and not a lot else". Directed by David Slade, The Twilight Saga: Eclipse, an adaptation of the third book in the series, was released on June 30, 2010. An article from The Guardian reported that it was the best film of the series according to critical consensus for being more "cinematic" and striking a better balance between romance and the supernatural. However, an article from The Telegraph rebutted The Guardian's claim, arguing that Twilight remained the best film in the series due to the "entirely straight-faced contrast between the forces of eternal darkness and the rigors of high school". Having already obtained the rights to Breaking Dawn, Summit approved a two-part adaptation.

In 2011, Meyer started her own production company, Fickle Fish Films, with producer Meghan Hibbett. Meyer spent much of 2011 producing both parts of Breaking Dawn, as well as the film adaptation of Shannon Hale's novel Austenland. Breaking Dawn: Part 1 was released on November 18, 2011, and the second part was released on November 16, 2012. Part one of the film received mixed reviews. Part two of the film received more positive reviews with Roger Ebert calling the ending "sensational". Critics also praised the acting, particularly that of Stewart.

The Twilight Saga was successful in the box office. With a combined budget of $373 million, the five-film series earned $3.341 billion worldwide. Despite the commercial success, the films were extensively criticized. Breaking Dawn: Part II won seven Golden Raspberry Awards (Razzie awards) including Worst Picture, Worst Sequel, and Worst Screen Couple (for Taylor Lautner and Mackenzie Foy). The series spawned two parody films: Vampires Suck and Breaking Wind, which were critical failures.

In 2009, Stephenie Meyer was included in the Forbes Celebrity 100 list of the world's most powerful celebrities, entering at No. 26. Her annual earnings exceeded $50 million. The same year, Meyer was ranked No. 5 on Forbes' list of "Hollywood's Top-Earning Women", the only author on the list, and it was noted that the "Twilight series of young-adult vampire books have taken the publishing and film worlds by storm". In 2010, Forbes ranked her as the No. 59 most powerful celebrity with annual earnings of $40 million.

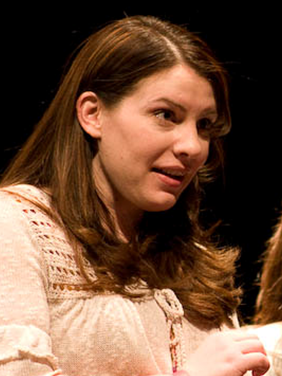
Meyer in 2009

=== Subsequent Twilight publications ===
In August 2009, USA Today revealed that Meyer broke J. K. Rowling's record on their bestseller list; the four Twilight books had spent 52 straight weeks in the top 10. In all, the books have spent more than 235 weeks on The New York Times Best Seller list. Upon the completion of the fourth entry in the series, Meyer indicated that Breaking Dawn would be the final novel to be told from Bella Swan's perspective. In 2015, she published a new book in honor of the 10th anniversary of the best-selling franchise titled Life and Death: Twilight Reimagined, with the genders of the original protagonists switched.

On March 30, 2010, it was announced that Meyer had written a 200-page novella entitled The Short Second Life of Bree Tanner. The book was released on June 5, 2010, by Atom and was available for free between June 7 and July 5 on the official website. Following the release of The Short Second Life of Bree Tanner, Stephenie Meyer donated $1.5 million to the American Red Cross Relief Fund to aid victims of the earthquakes in Haiti and Chile. Those who took advantage of the free e-book were also encouraged to make donations to the Red Cross.

Midnight Sun was to be a companion novel to the Twilight series. The novel was intended to be a retelling of the events of the novel Twilight, but from the perspective of Edward Cullen. Meyer had hoped to have Midnight Sun published shortly after the release of Breaking Dawn, but after an online leak of a rough draft of its first 12 chapters, Meyer chose to delay the project indefinitely. Upset by the release of a draft she called "messy and flawed", Meyer decided to pursue books unrelated to Twilight. She made the unedited and unfinished manuscript of a lengthy character development exercise of Midnight Sun available on her website.

The release of Midnight Sun was tentatively re-planned after re-visiting the Twilight series with Life and Death, a gender-swapped retelling of the novel in 2015. However, the release of Grey: Fifty Shades of Grey as Told by Christian in 2015 halted and soured Meyer's plans to release the Midnight Sun because Grey was also told from the male perspective. Meyer stated in a New York Comic-Con panel that it was "a literal flip the table moment", admitting that "Midnight Sun is kind of cursed". This led to the novel being on indefinite hold. According to an article from The Guardian in 2018, Midnight Sun was "no longer in the pipeline". However, in May 2020, it was announced that Midnight Sun would be released on August 4, 2020. Following its release, it sold over one million copies, was number two on Amazon's "most sold" list, and was number one on USA Today's bestseller list one week after its release date.

Meyer has mentioned having several other book ideas on file, including a ghost story titled Summer House, a novel involving time travel, as well as another about mermaids.

== Adult fiction publications ==
=== The Host ===
In May 2008, Meyer's adult sci-fi novel The Host was released by the adult division of Little, Brown and Company. It follows the story of Melanie Stryder and Wanderer, a young woman and an invading alien "soul", who are forced to work as one. The Host debuted at No. 1 on The New York Times Best Seller list and remained on the list for 26 weeks. Despite having expressed intention to write a trilogy, with the second and third books being called The Soul and The Seeker, respectively, Meyer has not published any follow-up novels to The Host as of 2026.

In April 2009, Meyer took part in Project Book Babe, a benefit designed to help pay her friend Faith Hochhalter's medical bills after Hochhalter was diagnosed with breast cancer. Meyer donated many advance reader copies and original manuscripts for auction.

The Host was adapted into a film with Andrew Niccol directing, and Saoirse Ronan starring as Melanie Stryder, Max Irons as Jared Howe and Jake Abel as Ian O'Shea. The film was released on March 29, 2013, to generally negative reviews. It received poor critical reviews and was a box office flop compared to the Twilight film series.

=== The Chemist and television productions ===
In late 2015, it was announced that Meyer was producing a TV series based on Daniel O'Malley's book, The Rook. Despite having purchased the rights for the novel with her production company, she left the project shortly after filming due to creative differences.

In July 2016, Little, Brown and Company announced that Meyer has written an adult action thriller titled The Chemist, about "an ex-agent on the run from her former employers". The book was released on November 8, 2016. In 2018, it was announced that Meyer's production company Fickle Fish would be working with Tomorrow Studios to produce a television series based on The Chemist.

== Reception ==
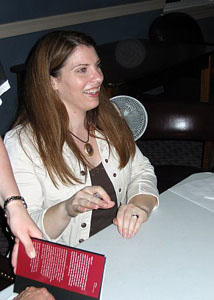
Meyer on her book tour for Eclipse in 2007

The reception of Meyer and her novels has been mixed. Entertainment Weekly has called Meyer "the world's most popular vampire novelist since Anne Rice", while The Guardian described her as an "imaginative storyteller, a prolific author and a newly powerful figure in the publishing market". Wayne Janes of the Toronto Sun agreed, saying "Meyer's success points up another trend—the virtual domination of the best-seller lists the last few years by what would normally be classified as young adult fiction", and noted, "In the absence of a new Harry Potter adventure, teens, fantasy enthusiasts and women (sales are mostly to women) who swoon at the idea of a virginal James Dean-ish vampire made Meyer the go-to gal for chaste love." Tymon Smith of The Times has described her as the "superstar of young adult fiction".

Meyer was named one of MSN Lifestyle's "Most Influential Women of 2008", where she was described as a "literary luminary". She was also ranked No. 49 on Time magazine's list of the "100 Most Influential People in 2008", and was included in their list of "People Who Mattered", with author Lev Grossman noting, "Maybe Americans aren't ready for a Mormon presidential nominee yet. But they're more than ready to anoint a Mormon as the best-selling novelist of the year."

She was ranked No. 82 on Vanity Fair's list of the "Top 100 Information Age Powers" of 2009. Meyer was featured in an issue of the biographical comic Female Force, a Bluewater Productions title that celebrates influential women in society and pop culture. Meyer was the second bestselling author of the decade, according to a list published by Amazon, beaten by J. K. Rowling.

Despite Meyer's success, her novels have been highly criticized. The New York Times called the premise of Twilight "attractive and compelling"; however, the review continues, "the book suffers at times from overearnest, amateurish writing", indicating that Meyer's relied too much on "telling" rather than "showing" and that there were excessive references to Edward's attractiveness and Bella's swooning. An article from The Guardian criticized Bella's character, calling her "a clumsy, selfish nincompoop with the charisma of a boiled potato" and criticized Edward's portrayal as the "perfect little gentleman" who constantly counters Bella's sexual advances. NPR criticized the novel for being a repetitive "jackhammer" masked behind ornate language. Furthermore, they found the story uninteresting and the main character unlikable. Entertainment Weekly stated that the narrative of Breaking Dawn was at times so chaotic and outrageous that Meyer shifted the point of view to Jacob Black, which only toned down the mayhem of the plot for so long.

Novelist Orson Scott Card, himself a Mormon, said, "[Stephenie Meyer] writes with luminous clarity, never standing between the reader and the dream they share. She's the real thing." In an interview with Newsweek, author Jodi Picoult said, "Stephenie Meyer has gotten people hooked on books, and that's good for all of us." Comparing Meyer to J. K. Rowling, Stephen King stated: "The real difference is that Jo Rowling is a terrific writer, and Stephenie Meyer can't write worth a darn. She's not very good." King went on to assert that Meyer's books appealed to readers because "[she's] opening up kind of a safe joining of love and sex in those books". American religious history scholar Jana Riess had mixed reactions to Meyer's novels. At times, she found the Mormon theology that influences Meyer's works to be beautiful and complex. However, she describes Meyer as a gifted storyteller, not a gifted writer, noting numerous technical flaws in her novels. Furthermore, Riess criticized the "retrogressive gender stereotypes" in Meyer's work.

The Quileute do have a tradition that their ancestors transformed from wolves to people, but most of the descriptions of the Quileute in the novel are inaccurate. The Quileute tribe described her use of their traditions in the books and films and subsequent merchandising as cultural theft.

=== Fan following ===
Meyer has gained a following among young adult readers of the Twilight novels, which are set in the small town of Forks on the Olympic Peninsula in Washington state. Forks has thus received attention from fans and celebrates "Stephenie Meyer Day" on September 13, the date of character Bella Swan's birthday. Meyer's fans cosplay her book characters, write fan fiction related to the stories, and attend book signings. Extreme fans are known as "Twihards".

Inspired by Meyer's Twilight series, a genre of geek rock called "Twi-rock", similar in purpose to wizard rock inspired by J. K. Rowling's Harry Potter series, has emerged. Examples of these Twilight-themed bands include the Bella Cullen Project, Twilight Music Girls, Be Safe Bella, Bella Rocks, and the Mitch Hansen Band. The Mitch Hansen Band wrote the song "By You" in hopes that it would be included on the New Moon film soundtrack. An unofficial Twilight themed fan convention called TwiCon was organized in Dallas, Texas, in summer 2009, which included "Twi-rock" band performances, a Volturi Ball, panels, workshops, and vendors.

Originally an online novelized "fan-fiction" of the Twilight series, the novel Fifty Shades of Grey by E. L. James loosely explores the relationship between the main characters had they not remained celibate before marriage. Though the publisher claims the novel is "original and no longer based on Twilight", James did not receive copyright authorization to write the novel and some have argued that Fifty Shades of Grey may be a copyright infringement. Though Meyer has stated that the novel is "too smutty" and does not interest her, she has not filed a copyright claim.

== Style and influences ==
=== Style ===
Since the release of Twilight, Meyer has been described as writing with "all plot and no style" and including "very little characterization", with her writing characterized as "fairly" poor. Meyer's prose can be seen as not necessarily consistent in style or voice; for example, her short story "Hell on Earth" is driven more by dialogue alone, in contrast with the ornate descriptions found in the Twilight series. Meyer relies on detailed expository descriptions and active voice in her novels; she often opens her sentences with the most important information. While a stylistic focus of most novels is character development, Meyer has stated that she intentionally avoided describing her characters in detail, which she believes allows the reader to more easily "step into [their] shoes". In some works such as New Moon, in which Bella is largely on her own, Meyer offers "deeper insight into Bella's psyche" through the chapter titles, rather than the prose itself.

Meyer's work is typically classified as melodrama. In Twilight, Meyer makes allusions to canonical texts such as the Book of Genesis, Wuthering Heights, Macbeth, Pride and Prejudice, Sense and Sensibility, and Songs of Innocence and of Experience. Meyer has said that the individual style of each of her novels came from various genres of music she listened to while writing. A corpus stylistics analysis of the Twilight saga revealed that much of Meyer's description and characterization revolved around the physical attributes of the characters as shown through eyes, face, and expression. Some of Meyer's most frequent descriptions related to eye color and expression, the juxtaposition of warmth and cold, and the words "black" and "dark". The study authors concluded that the predictability and superficiality of Meyer's descriptions indicate that Meyer's writing style is unexceptional, and the success of her novels was related more to clever marketing.

=== Influences ===
Stephenie Meyer has named Mormonism as her greatest influence. However, according to actor Robert Pattinson, Meyer did not intend to include Mormon references in the novels and films. Yet professor of film and religion Angela Aleiss noted numerous clear influences of Mormonism in the Twilight series. Meyer has said, "Unconsciously, I put a lot of my basic beliefs into the story. Free agency is a big theme." Meyer cited BYU professor Steven Walker as having influenced her work. She explained that he revealed a new way for her to see and study literature, which impacts her writing.

Meyer has cited many novels as inspiration for the Twilight series, including Jane Eyre by Charlotte Brontë and Lucy Maud Montgomery's Anne of Green Gables and its sequels. Each book in the series was also inspired specifically by a different literary classic: Twilight by Jane Austen's Pride and Prejudice; New Moon by William Shakespeare's Romeo and Juliet; Eclipse by Emily Brontë's Wuthering Heights; and Breaking Dawn by Shakespeare's The Merchant of Venice and A Midsummer Night's Dream. Although Meyer claims to have based Twilight on Pride and Prejudice, film studies scholar Anne Morey claims that the novel bears resemblance to Jane Eyre. The choice to name Edward came from the works of Charlotte Brontë and Jane Austen, and her novels are influenced by both medieval courtly love and 19th-century etiquette. Although Meyer has claimed that she did not read vampire literature and thus could not be influenced by it, scholars Anne Klaus and Stefanie Krüger argue that Meyer's characters bear similarities to "traditional vampire figures" and that Edward resembles both gothic villains and Byronic heroes. Meyer has indicated that despite the supernatural and vampire themes in her novels, she was influenced far more by Austen and Shakespeare than by Anne Rice or Stephen King. Meyer has described Austen, Shakespeare, and Orson Scott Card as her favorite authors.

Meyer has cited music as a prominent influence of her writing, and she posts playlists of songs which specifically inspired her books on her website. Bands included most often in her playlists are Muse, Blue October, My Chemical Romance, Coldplay, and Linkin Park. Meyer cites Muse as a particular inspiration because she uses the different emotions portrayed in their songs as influences for various genres of scenes.

== Recurring themes ==
=== Agency ===
According to professor of American religious history Jana Riess, a prominent theme in Meyer's novels is agency. In The Host, the Seeker believes that she is saving the human race by perfecting and controlling, similar to the Latter-day Saint belief that Satan's plan for human salvation was to "save" all souls by removing their agency and ability to sin. The Seeker plays a Satan-like role in the novel, as Meyer attempts to convey the message that the maintenance of agency is crucial. Additionally, Meyer's novels contain the themes of opposition. In The Host, Wanda learns that despite the lows and evils of humanity, beauty and pleasure could not be found on her previous planets because darkness did not exist. Wanda learns in the novel that it is only in facing darkness and sorrow that light and joy could be experienced, echoing a quotation from the Book of Mormon, "It must needs be that there is an opposition in all things". However, "imprinting" in her Twilight series, the involuntary formation of a mate relationship, undermines Meyer's prolific theme of free agency. According to literature and women's studies scholar Natalie Wilson, the juxtaposition between Bella's agency to choose her mate and Jacob, a Native American male's, inability to choose has racial and cultural implications.

=== Mortality and temptation ===
Another theme is overcoming the circumstances and temptations of mortality referred to in the Book of Mormon as overcoming the "natural man", which is exemplified by Meyer's character Edward. As a vampire, Edward's purpose is to be carnal, killing and feeding on human blood. As led by Carlisle, Edward chooses to give up this life and transcend his circumstances by becoming a "vegetarian", choosing to feed only on animals. He chooses to uphold these values despite the daily temptation, which only augments when he meets Bella; he finds her blood nearly irresistible. Edward undergoes a transformation in which Bella's trust in Edward allows him to trust his own ability to overcome temptation and keep Bella safe. Self-control is a prominent theme in the Twilight series, the word appears 125 times throughout the novels, as the main characters struggle to control their emotions, attraction, thirst, or jealousy.

=== Immortality and eternal life ===
Apparent in Meyer's Twilight series is the theme of the distinction between immortality and eternal life. In Meyer's novels, vampires are immortal and have superhuman gifts and abilities; however, the Cullen family longs for things they cannot have. Their circumstances prevent them from forming meaningful relationships with humans or other vampires, isolating them within their small clan. Furthermore, the couples in the Cullen family are unable to procreate, which causes severe bitterness in Rosalie who envies Bella's ability to be pregnant. According to Riess, the distinction between eternal life and immortality is represented by Bella, who in Breaking Dawn, has achieved eternal life rather than immortality because she achieved the Mormon tenets of eternal life: immortality and a perfected body, eternal parenthood, and an eternal marriage. Riess indicates that Bella receives immortality in an act of self-sacrifice rather than self-service, as she dies for the birth of her child. Bella is subsequently resurrected in a perfected vampire body. In Mormonism, resurrection occurs in the context of relationships, exemplified by Bella who enjoys her resurrected body in the company of her husband, child, and the rest of the Cullen family. The titles of the novels serve to reinforce this idea. At the beginning of the series, Bella discusses leaving Phoenix and heading to Forks where she says, "[goodbye] to the sun". The titles of the first three novels, Twilight, New Moon, and Eclipse, serve as natural phenomenon in which the sun is darkened. However, the final novel is titled Breaking Dawn, which symbolizes the beginning of a new day and Bella's transformation into a vampire and subsequent transcendence of her old life.

== Views ==
=== Religion ===
Meyer is a member of the Church of Jesus Christ of Latter-day Saints and does not drink alcohol or coffee, smoke, or watch R-rated movies. Similarly, there is no drinking and smoking in the novels (with the exception of her 2008 The Host, which contains drinking). Despite pressure to include a major sex scene, Meyer was adamant against including graphic sex in her series. According to Lev Grossman of Time, some of the series' appeal is due to its lack of sex and its eroticizing of abstinence. As a member of the Church of Jesus Christ of Latter-day Saints, Meyer acknowledges that her faith has influenced her work. In particular, she says that her characters "tend to think more about where they came from and where they are going, than might be typical." Meyer says that she does not consciously intend her novels to be influenced by her religion or to promote the virtues of sexual abstinence and spiritual purity, but admits that her writing is shaped by her values, saying, "I don't think my books are going to be really graphic or dark, because of who I am. There's always going to be a lot of light in my stories."

Growing up, Meyer's life and family revolved around the Church of Jesus Christ of Latter-day Saints. They were involved in their community, and a young Meyer met her future husband at church. She studiously read the Book of Mormon, citing the book as having "the most significant impact on [her] life". However, Meyer dislikes when media constantly mentions her religion, saying that the press does not emphasize the religions of other authors.

Meyer is cited as having played a part in bringing the Church of Jesus Christ of Latter-day Saints more into the mainstream by books The Mormon People: The Making of an American Faith by Matthew Bowman and LDS in the USA: Mormonism and the Making of American Culture by Lee Trepanier and Lynita K. Newswander.

=== Feminism ===
According to an article from The Guardian, Meyer considers herself a feminist. Meyer has stated that, "the world is a better place when women are in charge". Additionally, she was happy with the commercial successes of Catherine Hardwicke, the director of Twilight, and enjoyed working with a nearly all-female production for Austenland. Meyer has explained that her definition of feminism is the ability for a woman to choose, and the definition of anti-feminism is removing the choice, whether it fits gender stereotypes or not, from the woman entirely. She continued that some modern feminists contradict their message of equality for women by limiting or shaming certain women's choices. Furthermore, she stated that women who choose to stay home or have children are particularly criticized and that limitations on what women can do are anti-feminist in nature.

Meyer has been criticized by some feminists who consider Meyer an antifeminist writer. Some claim that the series romanticizes a physically abusive relationship, criticizing things like Bella's entire life revolving around Edward; never being in control of her own life; being absolutely dependent on Edward's ability to protect her life, her virginity, and her humanity; and the physical injuries Bella suffers from finally consummating her relationship with Edward. Meyer has dismissed such criticisms, saying both that the books center around Bella's choice and that her damsel in distress persona is due only to her humanity. Women's studies scholar Donna Ashcraft argues that Meyer is not a feminist, by definition, because her novels encourage traditional gender roles. However, although Ashcraft qualifies Meyer as traditional or non-feminist, she says that Meyer is not antifeminist.

After being asked in an interview with The Guardian whether she is anti-abortion, Meyer refused to directly answer the question, insisting that she does not like to talk about politics and that she abhors when celebrities use their popularity to influence voters.

== In popular culture ==
- In the 2010 vampire horror film Lost Boys: The Thirst, South African actress Tanit Phoenix played Gwen Lieber, a fictional character and a so-called copy of Stephenie Meyer, who was a writer of not-so-good romantic vampire novels. The character was later killed by Peter, the Alpha vampire (played by Felix Mosse).

== Awards ==
Year	Category	Institution or publication	Result	Notes	Ref.
2006	Best Fiction for Young Adults	Young Adult Library Services Association	Won	For Twilight	
2008	Author of the Year	USA Today	Won		
2009	Children's Book of the Year	British Book Awards	Won	For Breaking Dawn	

== Bibliography ==
=== Twilight series ===
- Main series:
  1. Twilight (2005)
  2. New Moon (2006)
  3. Eclipse (2007)
    3.5. The Short Second Life of Bree Tanner (2010), novella
  4. Breaking Dawn (2008)
- Related books:
  - The Twilight Saga: The Official Illustrated Guide (2011), reference guide
  - Life and Death: Twilight Reimagined (2015)
  - Midnight Sun (2020), retelling of Twilight from Edward's perspective

=== Standalone novels ===
- The Host (2008)
- The Chemist (2016)

=== Young adult short stories ===
- "Hell on Earth", published in Prom Nights from Hell (2007)

=== Comics ===
Twilight series:

1. Twilight: The Graphic Novel (2010–2011), with Young Kim
2. New Moon: The Graphic Novel (2012), with Young Kim

=== Non-fiction ===
- "Hero at the Grocery Store" (2006), article

== Filmography ==
Year	Title	Credited as			Notes	Ref.
Year	Title	Actress	Producer	Director	Notes	Ref.
2008	Twilight	Yes			Diner customer (uncredited)	
2008	The Resolution			Yes	Music video for The Resolution by Jack's Mannequin, co-director with Noble Jones	
2011	Breaking Dawn – Part 1	Yes	Yes		Part one of film based on her novel Breaking Dawn, wedding guest (uncredited)	
2012	Breaking Dawn – Part 2		Yes		Part two of film based on her novel Breaking Dawn	
2013	The Host		Yes		Film based on her novel The Host	
2013	Austenland		Yes		Film based on novel of the same name by Shannon Hale	
2018	Down a Dark Hall		Yes		Film based on novel of the same name by Lois Duncan	

== Adaptations ==
- Twilight (2008), film directed by Catherine Hardwicke, based on novel Twilight
- The Twilight Saga: New Moon (2009), film directed by Chris Weitz, based on novel New Moon
- The Twilight Saga: Eclipse (2010), film directed by David Slade, based on novel Eclipse
- The Twilight Saga: Breaking Dawn – Part 1 (2011), film directed by Bill Condon, based on novel Breaking Dawn
- The Twilight Saga: Breaking Dawn – Part 2 (2012), film directed by Bill Condon, based on novel Breaking Dawn
- The Host (2013), film directed by Andrew Niccol, based on novel The Host
- Twilight Storytellers: The Mary Alice Brandon File (2015), short directed by Kailey Spear and Sam Spear, based on novel series Twilight
- Twilight Storytellers: Consumed (2015), short directed by Maja Fernqvist, based on novel series Twilight
- Twilight Storytellers: The Groundskeeper (2015), short directed by Nicole Eckenroad, based on novel series Twilight
- Twilight Storytellers: Masque (2015), short directed by Cate Carson, based on novel series Twilight
- Twilight Storytellers: Sunrise (2015), short directed by Amanda Tasse, based on novel series Twilight
- Twilight Storytellers: Turncoats (2015), short directed by Lindsey Hancock Williamson, based on novel series Twilight
- Twilight Storytellers: We've Met Before! (2015), short directed by Yulin Kuang, based on novel series Twilight
