= TwiCon =

Unofficial Twilight fan convention (2009)

- Status: Defunct
- Venue: Sheraton Dallas Hotel
- Locations: Dallas, Texas
- Country: United States
- Inaugurated: 2009
- Most recent: 2009
- Attendance: 3000
- Organizer: TwiCon Partners LLC
- Filing status: For-profit
- Website: twicon.org

TwiCon was a Twilight fan convention which was held at the Sheraton Dallas Hotel from July 30 to August 2, 2009. TwiCon featured a movie screening, live Twilight-inspired band performances, a Volturi Masque Ball, opportunities to meet Twilight cast, breakout sessions, panels, workshops, a vendor hall, and an artist alley. Organizers and TwiCon Partners LLC co-owners included event planner Becky Scoggins and video blogger Bailey Gauthier.

TwiCon's guests included Twilight actors Christian Serratos (Angela Weber), Billy Burke (Charlie Swan), Peter Facinelli (Dr. Carlisle Cullen), Jackson Rathbone (Jasper Hale), Kellan Lutz (Emmett Cullen), and New Moon actor Alex Meraz (wolf pack member Paul). Sam Bradley, Marcus Foster, and Bobby Long, who all wrote songs included on the Twilight soundtrack, also attended. Both MTV and ReelzChannel had contests to choose fans to act as correspondents at TwiCon.

== Reception ==
Fan reception to the convention was mixed, with many con participants saying that they were very unhappy with the way things were run. Many con-goers reported sessions not lasting their full-time, as well as the con using volunteers for security. The A.V. Club panned the convention overall, commenting that it was poorly thought out and that the merchandise area gave "the impression that Twicon exists solely to get impressionable fans to pay for crap". Many fans noted that even the stars guesting at the convention appeared to be annoyed at the treatment given at the con.

== End ==
Citing both "competitive pressures" and "the persistent nature of the economic downturn", TwiCon Partners LLC announced that it would cease operations on March 13, 2010. Organizers said that "non-refundable deposits" and payments to "professional service providers" left them with insufficient funds to "cover the next round of deposits due to host the event". This cancelled TwiCon events planned for Ottawa in June 2010 and Las Vegas in late July 2010. (The Ottawa event was originally scheduled for Toronto but was forced to relocate due to the 2010 G-20 Toronto summit.) No official statements were ever released to the convention website as to the availability of refunds for ticketholders, although Scoggins claimed that her company had no control over the finances and that letters pertaining to the availability of refunds were forthcoming.
