= The Host (novel) =

2008 novel by Stephenie Meyer

- First edition cover
- Author: Stephenie Meyer
- Cover artist: Juliana Lee and Dalena
- Language: English
- Genre: Science fiction, Romance novel, Thriller, Dystopian
- Publisher: Little, Brown & Company
- Publication date: May 6, 2008
- Publication place: United States
- Media type: Print (hardcover, paperback) e-Book (Kindle); Audio book (CD)
- Pages: 619
- ISBN: 0-316-06804-7
- OCLC: 163708271
- Dewey Decimal: 813/.6 22
- LC Class: PS3613.E979 H67 2008

The Host is a 2008 science fiction romance novel by Stephenie Meyer. The book is about Earth, in a post-apocalyptic time, being invaded by a parasitic alien race known as "Souls", and follows one Soul's predicament when the consciousness of her human host refuses to give up her body.

The Host was released on May 6, 2008, with an initial print run of 750,000 copies. An international version of the novel was released on April 2, 2008, in the United Kingdom, Ireland, Indonesia, the Philippines, Australia and Hong Kong by the UK publishing division. It was translated into several other languages, including Spanish, French, German, Portuguese, and Italian, among others.

== Plot ==
A species of parasitic aliens called "Souls" have invaded Earth, deeming the humans too violent to deserve the planet. When a Soul is implanted into a host body, the consciousness of the original owner is erased, leaving their memories and knowledge. Wanderer, a Soul, is placed into the body of Melanie Stryder. However, Melanie's consciousness is still alive and begins to communicate with Wanderer mentally. Wanderer's assigned "Seeker" suggests that she could be placed into Melanie to retrieve the memories before disposing of the defective body, but Wanderer makes several attempts to deny her Seeker's wishes. As Wanderer starts to uncover some of Melanie's memories of her younger brother Jamie Stryder and her boyfriend Jared Howe, Melanie gets her to follow a series of landmarks throughout the Arizona desert to find her Uncle Jeb, hoping that Jared and Jamie are with him. By doing so, she would be denying the Seeker Melanie's memories and the humans they would lead her to.

When Jeb comes across Melanie's dying body, he realizes what had happened to her but still leads her to his hideout: a network of caves housing more than thirty people. Most of the other humans wanted her to be killed with the exception of Jared and Jamie, and later on Ian O'Shea, who develops feelings for Wanderer. As days pass and she starts to become a part of the community, many of the community members start to trust her with jobs and eventually gave her a teaching role among the colony. She is also given the name Wanda in replacement of the name Wanderer. After tending to a cancer patient one night, Wanda is attacked by Ian's brother, Kyle. After managing to save both herself and Kyle from drowning, the two are taken into the infirmary. Shortly after recovering, Wanda stumbles across a slew of mutilated bodies that cause her to hide by herself in terror for three days. During her time in isolation, Wanda learns from Jeb that the humans are trying to cut Souls out of their hosts in attempt to restore the consciousness and life of the humans but so far each attempt has resulted in a dead body.

When Jamie is suffering from a fever caused by infection from a leg injury, Wanda realizes that she must recover medicine from the Souls to cure Jamie before it is too late. With the assistance of Jared, the two manage to cure Jamie's ailments in time. Thanks to her efforts, Wanda is entrusted with attending raids for supplies and it is now believed by many that Melanie is still present inside Wanda's mind. Not long after the raiders return to the colony, they learn that the caves have been attacked and Wanda's Seeker has been captured. After coming to a conclusion about the Seeker's life, Wanda decides to tell Doc how to properly remove Souls from human bodies. The Seeker is sent back into space. Wanda devises another plan to remove herself from Melanie's body and let herself die in order to allow Melanie to return to Jared once more. Learning of Wanda's plan, Ian becomes furious and calls a tribunal to stop her plans. Despite his attempts, Wanda manages to get herself to Doc's beforehand. Before going through the procedure though, Wanda declares her love for Ian.

To her surprise, Wanda wakes up in a new host whose consciousness has not returned. In her new body, Wanda gains wide acceptance from the humans and is free to be in a relationship with Ian while Melanie goes back with Jared. Over the course of time following the surgery, the colony begins to grow and many of its residents become more prosperous than ever before. The novel ends with their discovery of another group of humans like theirs who have a Soul named Burns in their group.

== Main characters ==
Wanderer – Nicknamed Wanda, a parasitic alien Soul who is inserted into Melanie Stryder's body. She received her name because of the number of planets she has lived on, having never settled on one she truly liked. She is later nicknamed "Wanda" by Mel's Uncle Jeb. Initially only interested in enjoying her new life, Melanie's love for her brother and boyfriend spills over to Wanda and she finds herself abandoning her kind to seek them out in the desert. She slowly develops sympathy for humans, eventually acknowledging that they have a right to their own lives, and attempting to sacrifice herself so that Melanie can have her life back. Like all Souls, she is naturally altruistic, horrified by violence, and finds it difficult to believably lie (to humans). She hates upsetting people and so suffers endlessly trying to be as little of a burden as possible.

Melanie Stryder – Melanie is a human rebel who was captured and implanted with a Soul after years of evading the Seekers. She is Wanderer's host body. Melanie's consciousness survives and resists Wanderer's control as best she can. She likes the feeling of being physically strong and berates Wanderer for neglecting to keep her that way. She has a temper and is often quick to use threats of violence, much to Wanda's displeasure. Melanie is passionately in love with Jared and shares a strong bond with her brother, Jamie, of whom she is fiercely protective. Despite initial anger at Wanderer for stealing her life, their shared love of Jamie and Jared turns them into unwilling allies. Their relationship grows to the point where Melanie tearfully begs Wanda not to give her body back, knowing the alien plans to kill herself once removed. Melanie is described as having hazel eyes, dark hair and tan skin and is half Latina on her mother's side.

Ian O'Shea – Wanderer calls Ian "as kind as a Soul, but strong as only a human could be". Like most of the group, he has a strong dislike of the Souls in the beginning, but quickly abandons it once he begins to empathize with Wanderer. Other characters seem to view him as mostly level-headed. Ian befriends Wanderer and gradually falls in love with her because of her personality, insisting he cares very little about Mel's body. He is constantly annoyed at how selfless and self-sacrificing she is, worrying that she is willing to do things she does not want because she thinks it will make others happy. Once Wanda is put into a new host they begin a relationship. He does not help Melanie find a new body for Wanda, which surprises Melanie. Ian said that he did not care what she looked like; he loved Wanda for her personality. He is described as being tall and muscular, with black hair, sapphire blue eyes and fair skin.

Jared Howe – Melanie's lover. Jared met Melanie while they were both stealing food from the same house, each believing the other to be a Soul; when he realized he had found another human he was so excited he kissed her. Loving, aggressive and somewhat excitable in Melanie's memories, by the time Wanderer meets him he has become bitter and hardened. He originally despises Wanda for taking Mel's life, but he cannot bring himself to let Doc experiment on her. He starts to change his views on the Soul when he sees her comforting a dying friend. His survival skills are an asset to the group, and he is often charged with leading the raids because of his rationality and levelheadedness. He has a somewhat parental relationship with Jamie, whom he continued to care for after Melanie's capture. He is described as being muscular and tall, with tan skin, sienna-colored eyes and naturally dark, but sun-bleached hair.

Jamie Stryder – Jamie is Melanie's younger brother. Unlike most characters, he holds no animosity towards Wanderer for stealing his sister's body or life and quickly comes to view her as a substitute sibling. He is fascinated with Wanda's stories about the other planets and the species that live on them. Despite his apparent innocence and naivete, Jamie wants to be treated like an adult; he yearns to go on raids with the others, and is uncomfortable with the coddling he receives when he is injured.

Uncle Jeb – Jebediah "Jeb" is Melanie's eccentric uncle. A paranoid survivalist before the invasion, Jeb had constructed an elaborate hide-out in caves beneath the Arizona desert. He maintains strict control over the hide-out by virtue of having the only firearm. He believes Wanderer can fit in with the humans and pushes for this to the point of creating great strain within the group. He is calm and deliberate in his decision-making, and despite being one of the most welcoming towards Wanderer, nonetheless does not hesitate to explain and justify the human perspective to her.

The Seeker – The Soul who originally caught Melanie. Her calling is to search for and track down humans who have managed to avoid implantation, although she takes her job more seriously than most others. Mutual spite towards the Seeker is the basis of Melanie and Wanderer's early relationship. She is unusually irritable and edgy for her species, at one point even shooting a human in cold blood, despite most Souls not being able to even pick up a gun. She mocks Wanderer for not being able to completely drive out Melanie's consciousness. This is later revealed to be because of her insecurity at having failed to subdue her own host, Lacey, who speaks to her like Melanie does to Wanda. Lacey is just as abrasive as the Seeker.

Kyle O'Shea – Kyle, Ian's brother, is impulsive, quick-tempered, and often considered a pain by the others. His hate for Souls is extreme, even among the group. He tries to kill Wanda, despite being warned not to hurt her, and ironically has to be saved by her from falling to his death after he is knocked out in the struggle. When he realises the Seeker's host was able to get her body back, he leaves to kidnap Sunny, the Soul now inhabiting Jodi's body, and takes her back to the cave to see if he can get Jodi back. He is shocked to discover that Sunny is not scared and feels an attachment to him, the way Wanderer did to Jared. When Jodi does not wake up after Sunny is removed, he allows Sunny to stay. Although still wishing Jodi could return, he becomes close to Sunny and they are described as being inseparable.

Doc – A tall, slim human who was a surgeon and serves as the group's doctor. Wanda's initial impression of him is that he is a cold-hearted torturer, but he is later shown as being deeply affected by the suffering of his patients and is one of the first humans to accept Wanda. He is fascinated by how effective Soul medicine is and is desperate to find a way to remove Souls without killing either the parasite or the host. Doc is prone to alcoholic binges when he fails in these endeavors. His real name is Eustace, as he mentioned to Wanda before he removed her from her host. A man of his word, Doc is only stopped from letting Wanda die like he promised her because Jared threatens him with a hunting knife. Some of his characteristics were influenced by Meyer's younger brother, Seth.

== Major themes ==
In an interview with Vogue, Meyer stated that body image was a major aspect of her novel. She noted that she is "very critical" of her body, but not others'. In The Host, she tried to convey "what a gift it is to just have a body, and really love it". This is something most humans would take for granted before being captured, and something of which Melanie is all-too aware once she loses control of her body. Other themes Meyer explored were the mother/child bond, the need to change our lives for the ones we love or because our community expects of us something other than what we want, and not fitting in. In other interviews, various themes were noted including the value of the Soul and faith in a world that has been destroyed, tolerance, forgiveness and understanding. Identity issues are also frequently mentioned, as Wanderer notes whether other characters differentiate between her personality and Melanie's identity as they interact with her.

== References to other works ==
Like Meyer's other books, The Host includes a poem at the beginning of the novel. The poem, by May Swenson, is titled Question, and ties into the idea of the mind's reliance on the existence of the body, just as Melanie experiences when inhabited by Wanderer.

== Sequels ==
Meyer has said that she is working on additional books in The Host series and that she intends to write a trilogy. She said in an interview with MTV that the first sequel would be titled The Seeker and the second would be titled The Soul. In November 2009, she said, "I'd like to eventually have The Host be part of a trilogy." In February 2011, Meyer said that she had outlines for the sequels and had done some writing on them.

== Reception ==
In a review of the book for The Guardian, Keith Brooke wrote: "When it's good, the novel works well, and will appeal to fans of the author's hugely bestselling Twilight series, but it is little more than a half-decent doorstep-sized chunk of light entertainment."

The Host was a #1 New York Times best seller, and remained on this list for 26 weeks. It also spent over 36 weeks on the Los Angeles Times bestseller list. The novel was #1 on Maclean's magazine's list of 10 top-selling fiction books in Canada and was named one of the "Best Books of May" by Amazon.

== Film adaptation ==
The Host was developed into a film with Andrew Niccol as director and Saoirse Ronan as Melanie. The project was first announced in September 2009 when the producers Nick Wechsler, Steve Schwartz and Paula Mae Schwartz used independent financing to acquire film rights to The Host. Niccol was hired to write the screenplay and to direct the film. Principal photography began in February 2012 in Louisiana and New Mexico. Open Road Films acquired the U.S. distribution rights for the film and Meyer acted as co-producer. The film was released on March 29, 2013, to largely negative reviews.
