= Twilight (disambiguation) =

Twilight is the time of day before sunrise or after sunset.

Twilight may also refer to:

== Arts, entertainment and media ==
=== Fictional characters ===
- Twilight (Marvel Comics), in the Marvel Comics X-Nation 2099 series
- Twilight (Spy × Family), or Loid Forger, the main character of the manga series Spy × Family
- Twilight, in the DP 7 comic book series
- Twilight, a persona of Angel (Buffy the Vampire Slayer)
- Twilight, in the Milestone Comics superhero team Shadow Cabinet
- Twilight, a great grey owl in the Guardians of Ga'Hoole novel series by Kathryn Lasky
- Twilight, from Go! Princess Precure
- Twilight Sparkle, the main character of My Little Pony: Friendship Is Magic
- Sophie Twilight, from Ms. Vampire Who Lives in My Neighborhood

=== Film ===
- Twilight (1940 film), a German film by Rudolf van der Noss
- Twilight (1944 film), a French drama film directed by Marc Allégret
- Twilight (1945 film), a Mexican drama film directed by Julio Bracho
- Twilight (1969 film), a Cambodian film by King Norodom Sihanouk
- Twilight (1998 film), an American thriller by Robert Benton
- Twilight (2007 film), a.k.a. La Brunante, a Canadian drama film directed by Fernand Dansereau
- The Twilight Story, a 1960 Japanese film by Shirō Toyoda
- The Twilight Saga (film series), adapted from Stephenie Meyer's novels
  - Twilight (2008 film), the first film in the series

=== Television ===
- "Twilight" (NCIS), 2005
- "Twilight" (Star Trek: Enterprise), 2003
- "Twilight", a 1989 episode of China Beach
- "Twilight", a 2008 episode of Di-Gata Defenders
- "Twilight", a 2003 episode of The Galaxy Railways
- "Twilight", a 1998 episode of Hercules: The Legendary Journeys
- "Twilight", a 1998 episode of Lexx
- "Twilight", a 2006 episode of Rescue Me
- "Twilight", a 2003 episode of Six Feet Under
- "Twilight", a 2003 episode of Justice League

=== Books ===
- Twilight (novel series), a series of novels by Stephenie Meyer
  - Twilight (Meyer novel), the first novel in the series
- Twilight, a novella by Stefan Zweig, 1910
- Twilight, a novel by Frank Danby, 1916
- "Twilight" (short story), a short story by John W. Campbell, 1934
- Twilight, a novel by Yosef Reinman, published under the pen name Avner Gold, 1985
- Twilight, a novel by Judith Arnold, 1988
- Twilight (Wiesel novel), by Elie Wiesel, 1988
- Twilight: Where Darkness Begins, a 1980s series of teen horror novels
- Twilight, a novel by Peter James, 1991
- Twilight, a novel by Nancy Pickard, 1995
- Twilight, a novel by Sherryl Woods, 1997
- Twilight (Cabot novel), the sixth novel in the Mediator series by Meg Cabot, 2004
- Twilight, a novel by William Gay, 2006
- Twilight, a novel by Brendan DuBois, 2007
- Twilight (Hunter novel), a 2007 Warriors: The New Prophecy novel by Erin Hunter
- Twilight, a novel by Azhar Abidi, 2008
- Doors X: Twilight, a novel by Markus Heitz, 2018
- The Servants of Twilight, a 1984 novel by Dean Koontz, originally released as Twilight

=== Comics ===
- Twilight (comic book), a 1990 DC Comics miniseries by Howard Chaykin and Jose Luis Garcia Lopez
- "Twilight" (Buffy comic), a 2010 story arc of the Buffy the Vampire Slayer Season Eight series
- Twilight: The Graphic Novel, a 2010 2-part comic book miniseries by Young Kim
- Twilight, a "bad girl" comic from Avatar Press
- Twilight, a story arc of the Star Wars: Republic series

=== Music ===
==== Classical ====
- "Twilight" (Elgar), by Edward Elgar, based on the Gilbert Parker poem
- "Twilight" (Kancheli), a composition for two violins and chamber orchestra by Giya Kancheli

==== Bands ====
- Twilight (band), an American metal band
- Beyond Twilight, originally Twilight, a Danish progressive metal band
- Deathbound, originally Twilight, a Finnish death metal band

==== Albums ====
- Twilight (Blue System album), 1989
- Twilight (Bôa album) or the title song, 2001
- Twilight (Erben der Schöpfung album), 2001
- Twilight (Future of Forestry album) or the title song, 2007
- Twilight (Hale album), 2006
- Twilight (The Handsome Family album), 2001
- Twilight (The Suicide File album) or the title song, 2003
- Twilight (Twilight album), 2005
- Twilight (soundtrack), from the 2008 film
- Twilight as Played by The Twilight Singers or the title song, 2000
- Twilight, by Caroline Herring, 2001
- Twilight, by Corpus Delicti, 1993
- Twilight, a demo album by Leona Lewis

==== Songs ====
- "Twilight" (Cover Drive song), 2012
- "Twilight" (Electric Light Orchestra song), 1981
- "Twilight", by BZN, 1982
- "Twilight", by Alter Bridge from The Last Hero, 2016
- "Twilight", by Antony and the Johnsons from Antony and the Johnsons, 2000
- "Twilight", by Ateez from Treasure EP.1: All to Zero, 2018
- "Twilight", by the Band from The Best of The Band, 1976
- "Twilight", by Bravehearts from Bravehearted, 2003
- "Twilight", by Delerium from Karma, 1997
- "Twilight", by Edge of Sanity from Purgatory Afterglow, 1994
- "Twilight", by Elliott Smith from From a Basement on the Hill, 2004
- "Twilight", by Fear, and Loathing in Las Vegas from Dance & Scream, 2010
- "Twilight", by God Is an Astronaut from The End of the Beginning, 2002
- "Twilight", by Loona from Kim Lip, 2017
- "Twilight", by Maze from Back to Basics, 1993
- "Twilight", by the Raveonettes from Pretty in Black, 2005
- "Twilight", by Safri Duo, 2008
- "Twilight", by Squirrel Nut Zippers from Hot, 1996
- "Twilight", by Stray Kids from Ate, 2024
- "Twilight", by Thriving Ivory from Thriving Ivory, 2008
- "Twilight", by U2 from Boy, 1980
- "Twilight", by Unkle from War Stories, 2007
- "Twilight", by Vanessa Carlton from Be Not Nobody, 2002

=== Visual arts ===
- Twilight (painting), a 1981 painting by Odd Nerdrum
- Twilight, a series of photographs by Gregory Crewdson

=== Other uses in arts and entertainment ===
- Twilight (game developer), a defunct UK video game development group
- Twilight: 2000, a 1984 role-playing game
  - Twilight: 2000 (video game), the video game adaptation
- Twilight: Los Angeles, 1992, a 1994 play by Anna Deavere Smith
- Project: Twilight, a 2001 audio drama based on the TV series Doctor Who

== Places ==
- Twilight, Pennsylvania, U.S.
- Twilight, West Virginia, U.S.
- Twilight, Ohio County, West Virginia, U.S.
- Twilight Bay, Antarctica
- Twilight Peak, a mountain in Colorado, U.S.

== Other uses ==
- Twilight (1864 towboat)
- Twilight (warez), a former monthly Dutch warez disc compilation series
- Twilight anesthesia, an anesthetic technique
- Twilight Festival, in Columbia, Missouri, U.S.
- Twilight Criterium, a bicycle racing event in Athens, Georgia, U.S.
- Alexander Twilight (1795–1857), Vermont politician

== See also ==
- Twilight zone (disambiguation)
- Yugure (disambiguation)
