= List of Di-Gata Defenders spells =

This is a list of known stone casts used throughout the animated television series, Di-Gata Defenders. Sorcery in RaDos mostly uses special dice-like stones called Di-Gata Stones as a casting medium, and draw upon the land (or water if the caster uses Aqua Stones) and a portion of the person's inner power. The innate powers found within the Wizards of Yan do not abide to using physical Di-Gata stones, as they can create them via summoning. However, they use their own power to do so.

When the stones are summoned, they can form henges to manifest themselves as attacks. To create Henges, Warrior Stones and Booster Stones are needed, and the Booster Stones must be the all identical, or a mis-cast will occur (unintended spell effect). But there is no such thing as a powerful spell, as each spell the caster knows appears to be used based on the situation the battle or task has gotten to, even if the caster was to put in a Warrior and 3 Boosters.

The exception to the rules are Guardians. They live inside their own stones or items and require no power cost from the land nor the caster, with an exception to Booster Stones to increase their effectiveness. However, they have a certain amount of longevity before reverting to their stone form. Guardians themselves use their own bodies to attack.

If a stone caster has no energy, then the stones cannot work. Warriors and Boosters cannot work on large bodies of water, as there is no land to draw from. Stones will also not work if some source messes with the land's general energies (certain locations, a Negastorm are examples).

== Offensive casts using warrior + booster stones ==
Character	Attack Name	Stone Cost	Henge Description	Attack Description	First episode the attack is featured in	
Seth	Doom Dart	Nega warrior	The Nega sigil	Sends out a spinning knife shaped like Nega. Used to cut or stab enemies. As of Season II, it now fires small knife-shaped rocks, fired like pin needles.	First Physical Appearance: Ms Fortune	
	Spinning Doom	Nega warrior, Dako booster	The horizontal bar on Nega is replaced by Dako.	Sends out a spinning, energy shuriken. Also used to cut down enemies, but has more control over direction than Doom Dart.	Snared (Mentioned in "The Key")	
	Nega Mass	Nega warrior, Dako booster, Dako booster	Same as Spinning Doom, but with an extra Dako underneath the first one.	Sends out a tiny ball of condensed Nega energy, its appearance is like a lava rock.	Trouble in Paradise	
	Screaming Pinwheel	Nega warrior, Dako booster, Dako booster, Dako booster	The Dakos are extra horizontal bars on the Nega.	Sends out an almost uncontrollable. vacuum blast of white energy. It can't do damage by itself. But it can pick up objects and toss them around, like a tornado. It's given the name by the sounds it makes as it moves through the air.	Snared	
	Bedlam	Dako warrior	The Dako sigil	Two effects: It either Sends out one or a bunch of tiny dark spirits that look like shadow fish, they disable all electrical devices. Or it forms darkness within the energy form and destroys it.	Ms. Fortune	
	Twisting Chaos	Dako Warrior, Nega Booster	Nega points downward from Dako's South.	Two effects. Either sends out a black energy worm, or enhances Seth with four tentacles. These tentacles add to his mobility and physical strength by being able to lift larger objects. Can also be released to constrict or squeeze an opponent.	First Effect: Snared Second Effect: Escape from Ogama-Gor	
	Pandemonium	Dako Warrior, Nega Booster, Nega Booster	2 Negas point from Dako's east and west.	Summons mechanical squids. They wrap and constrict around the opponent and turn into metal strands around the enemy. Can also send out electro-static discharges to pin down the prey.	Trouble in Paradise	
	Dark Anarchy	Dako Warrior, Nega Booster, Nega Booster, Nega Booster	There is a Nega at each compass direction except south.	Summons a large blade of darkness. Anything enveloped in it takes damage or gets destroyed. It can also shroud the battlefield in darkness, causing blindness.	-	
	Take Form	Dako guardian or Altas-Dako guardian	The Dako sigil or the vertical line of Dako goes through Altas.	Summons Kragus or Omnikragg	Kragus: Trouble in Paradise, Omnikragg: Ethos	
	Come Forth	Altas guardian	The Altas sigil	Summons Omniaxor	Dark Descent	
	Doom Quake	Omnikragg summoned, Dako booster, Dako booster	2 Separate Dakos	The two boosters manifest into energy balls that strike at Omnikragg's back, causing him to send out and earth-shattering roar.	With Kragus: Replication, With Omnikragg: -	
	Nova Henge	Nova Champion	Ogama and Nega. The Nega replaces the top Ogama bar.	The stone's main function. Sends out an enormous boost of power in the form of a blue beam.	Uncontrolled: The Key to Victory, Controlled: The Returning	
	Nova Prison	Nova Champion	Ogama and Nega. The Nega replaces the top Ogama bar.	The second function of the stone. Can trap spirits and conceal them within the stone.	Perfect Host	
Melosa	Chillbane	Yan warrior	The Yan sigil	Sends out an ice crystal. The ends are solid and sharp enough to hurt enemies.	Trouble in Paradise	
	Freezing Hail	Yan warrior, Yan booster	Two Yans overlapping each other.	Same as Chillbane, but can freeze the target and sends out multiple shots.	-	
	Snow Blast	Yan warrior, Sum booster, Sum booster	The two Sums are at both vertical ends of the Yan.	Sends out a concentrated blast of snow.	Trouble in Paradise	
	Blizzard	Yan warrior, Sum booster, Sum booster	Same as Snow Blast	Enhances Melosa with a snow catsuit. This blue hooded catsuit adds protection from some damage and allows her to move extremely fast. Can sometimes freeze enemies.	Von Faustien	
	Frigid Tempest	Yan warrior, Sum booster, Sum booster, Sum booster	Two of the Yans are placed in the same manner as Snow Blast. The third Yan replaces the vertical line of Sum.	Two effects. Either calls a medium-sized snowstorm upon the target. Or enhances Melosa with a curved frost baton on her right arm and a large frost shield on her left.	First Effect: - Second Effect: -	
	Breath of Zephyr	Sum warrior, Yan booster	The Yan is inside Sum.	Instant-Freezes the target. Constant- Creates a frozen wall over a target area. Global- Drops temperature in area, extinguishes fires, freezes water.	First Effect: - Second Effect: Warriors Third Effect: -	
	Glacial Flow	Sum warrior, Yan booster, Yan booster	Reversed sigils of Snow Blast.	A large area freeze spell. Its freezing effect moves forward.	Trouble in Paradise	
	Crystal Casket	Sum warrior, Yan booster, Yan booster, Yan booster	Two Yans are on the outside of the Sum. The last Yan is inside Sum's core.	Same as Glacial Flow, but a much slower and deeper freeze effect. Can also freeze energy forms.	The Key to Victory	
	Sub-Zero	Amulet	The Yan sigil	Summons Draykor	Trouble in Paradise	
	Freezing Avatar of Yan	Amulet	-	Summons Draykor in the form of an ice Phoenix. Draykor can freeze anything in the same way Crystal Casket does.	Snared	
Kara	Fog Shroud	Altas warrior	The Altas sigil	Sends out a shroud of thick fog. Hides anyone who wanders into it.	Den of Thieves	
	Pillar of Altas	Altas warrior, Yin booster	The Yin is directly inside Altas.	Same as Tornado, except non-damaging - designed to lift the Defenders to high places or escape.	-	
	Mantle of Yin	Altas warrior, Yin booster	Same as Pillar of Altas.	Summons a magic carpet, used to fly without the help of V-Moth.	The Key to Victory	
	Typhoon of Power	Altas warrior, Yin booster, Yin booster	Two Yins are on each side of the horizontal bars of the Altas.	Calls a thunderstorm above the target that sends down magical lightning.	First use: Warriors First Henge Appearance: Replication	
	Bolt of Altas	Altas warrior, Yin booster, Yin booster, Yin booster	Similar to Typhoon of Power, but the third Yin is located similar to Pillar of Altas.	Electrocutes herself to send out bolts of electricity through discharging.	The Key to Victory	
	Tornado	Yin warrior, Altas booster	The two Yin points replace the Altas point on the top.	Sends out a cyclone of wind. Designed to damage anyone who gets picked up by its power.	The Key to Victory	
	Yinn-icane	Yin warrior, Yin booster, Yin booster, Yin booster	Henge unknown, as this attack was merely mentioned	Summons an electrified tornado	First mentioned in Carved in Stone	
	Prison of Yin	Yin warrior, Altas booster, Altas booster	Henge unknown, as was used before Kara got pushed off a ledge.	Builds a cage around the enemy.	First mentioned in Den of Thieves	
	Take Flight	Yin guardian	The Yin sigil	Summons V-Moth	Trouble in Paradise	
Kali	Black Devourer	Some assortment of Dako and Altas stones	-	Transforms her hands into claws	Shape Shifted	
Erik	Flash Blast	Ogama warrior	The Ogama sigil	Fires a concentrated blast of light, which has the power of concussion and stunning.	Warriors	
	Forge Fire	Ogama warrior, Infinis booster	The Infinis joins the two arc points of the Ogama.	Sends out ball-like grenades. Upon contact, these explosives latch onto the target and explode after a few seconds. Encases Eik in armour when used in combination with fabricator.	Trouble in Paradise	
	Singeing Spar	Ogama warrior, Infinis booster, Infinis booster	The lines at both ends of the Ogama are replaced by an Infinis.	Two effects. Either sends out a concentrated blade of heat. Or gives Erik a metal suit of armour and a welding torch.	First Effect: The Road Less Travelled Second effect: Von Faustien	
	Incinerator	Ogama Warrior, Infinis Booster, Infinis Booster, Infinis Booster	Two of the three Infinis boosters are placed similar to Singeing Spar. The third Infinis replaces the vertical line on the Ogama.	Summons a series of rings of fire that Erik controls. The rings can destroy anything within a large radius.	Absolution	
	Flaming Vortex	Ogama warrior, Ogama booster	Two Ogamas are linked by their top bars.	Like Singeing Spar, except sends out a spinning vortex of flame instead of a blade.	Nexus	
	Fabricator	Infinis Warrior	The Infinis sigil	Had three effects. It either forms a pair of handcuffs and leg fetters, creates a laser cage, or creates a gas mask to block out any poisonous gases. If combined with Forge Fire, it can encase Erik in armour.	First Effect: Warriors Second Effect: Nexus Third Effect: Dark Equinox: Part Two	
	Generator	Infinis warrior, Ogama booster	The Ogama is turned horizontally and is seen near the inside-left part of the Infinis.	Summons a large amount of metal. The metal then takes shape of various objects, like metal prisons, to a hammer, to amplifier rings or gauntlets.		
	Constructor	Infinis warrior, Ogama booster	Same as Generator.	Enhances Erik's arms with drills. Used for drilling into rocks and hard-shelled enemies.	-	
	Grand Mechanism	Infinis warrior, Ogama booster, Ogama booster, Ogama booster	The Infinis and one of the Ogamas are placed similar to Generator/Constructor. Two Ogamas are linked onto the Infinis side points by their top bars.	Summons a metal ring that generates metallic plates. These metal squares can block attack spells or enemies. The plates can function like Generator's metal prison function when needed.	Warriors	-
	Fabricator-Forge Fire Fusion Attack	Stone cost unknown	Henge unknown	Coats Erik in metal armour that has a gauntlet with a cone on the end that is lit on fire. The mask he is wearing resembles Robotus' face.	-	
	Activate	Ogama guardian	The Ogama sigil	Summons Robotus	Trouble in Paradise	
	Energy Drain	Mal-Ra Champion, Orn-Ra Champion	The Mal-Ra and Orn-Ra sigils	Surrounds Erik in energy and drains the creature of its energy, but at a cost - Kara's life imprisoned in the Life Stone. The Mal-Ra and Orn-Ra stones were destroyed after this attack.	The Di-Gata Redemption	
	Dakocite Devastation	Mal-Ra Champion, Orn-Ra Champion	The Mal-Ra and Orn-Ra sigils, one on top of the other. Which ones exactly are unknown.	Summons a gigantic earthquake which Erik has control over. It can even summon lava from the depths of Rados.	Di-Gata Dawn	
Adam	Assassin	Yan warrior, Infinis booster	-	Enhances Adam's speed to lightning fast. While in this form, he can make quick and painful physical punches, grapples and kicks.	Snared	
	Black Bolas	Infinis warrior, Yan booster	Yan's bottom line is replaced with Infinis halves.	Fires 2 energy bolas. It has the power of constriction.	The Road Less Travelled	
	Power of the Guild	Yan warrior, Yin booster, Yin booster	Yan is in the middle, with a Yin at its north and south. The south one is upside down. The lines of Yin use the bottom or top of Yan.	Two effects. Fires a fragile device that launches towards the target. Once it hits an object, the device explodes and releases knock out or nerve gas. Other effect is a net.	First Effect: Ethos Second Effect: The Empty Book	
	Deceptor	Strangely, there are two stone costs. The first one is Yan warrior, Yin booster. The second one uses six boosters: 3 Yins and 3 Yans. Either way, the henge is the same.	The Yan is in the middle, with the Yin at its north.	Creates multiple energy clones of Adam, designed to confuse an attacker.	Snared	
	Ignite	Infinis guardian	The Infinis sigil	Summons Firefox	Snared	
	Heart of Yin	Firefox summoned, Yin booster, Yan booster	Reversed sigils of Deceptor.	Turns Firefox into a flame spirit. Upon contact, the enemy is burned by the intense heat of the fire.	Snared	
	Phase Stone	Phase Champion	Yin-Infinis henge. The two halves of Infinis replace the bottom bar on Yin.	If collides with an inanimate object, it temporarily allows anyone to pass through it as if it never existed.	The Town that Time Forgot	
Brackus	Blazing Fires of Dako	Infinis warrior, Dako booster, Dako booster	2 Dakos are at Infinis' connection points	Ignites Brackus' body to send out flame whips and blasts.	Perfect Host	
	Scourge of Infinis	Dako warrior, Infinis booster, Infinis booster or Dako booster	Same as Blazing Fires, except Dako is in the middle	Two effects. Either fires energy darts that inflict pain upon contact. Or spreads a painful poison through the body on contact with the stone.	Perfect Host	
	Searing Havoc	Dako Warrior, Infinis booster, Infinis Booster	Same as Scourge of Infinis	Enhances Brackus' hands, transforming them into claws.	Complications	
	Infinikizm	Infinis warrior, Dako booster (seen boosted with 2 extra Dako Boosters from Seth)	Same as Blazing Fires, but the extra Dako cuts through the center of Infinis	Sends out a long, black energy javelin.	Regenesis	
	Devastation of Infinis	Unknown	Unknown	Grants Brackus the ability to manipulate fire.	The Horn of Neglos	
	Maximum Voltage	Infinis-Nega Guardian	The top bar on Nega is replaced by two Infinis halves.	Summons Anaconduit	The Road Less Travelled	
	Uncoil	Yin-Infinis-Nega Guardian	Same as Anaconduit, but the Yin is placed like the henge seen on Dreadcrow.	Summons Darkviper	Regenesis	
	Anamous Vitae	Nostrum Vitae Stone	The Nostrum Vitae Sigil	Instantly heals small wounds (or helps heal serious wounds) and cures sicknesses	The Healer	
	Altas Nostrum	Nostrum Vitae Stone	The Nostrum Vitae Sigil	Instantly turns the target into rock	The Healer	
Flinch	Psyclone	Yin warrior, Infinis booster, Infinis booster	Like the henge seen on Dreadcrow, except instead of one Infinis, it’s two. One on each side.	Sends out a dark spirit, in the form of a banshee. When amplified, the screams from the spirit can pierce the ears.	-	
	Choking Vapour	Infinis warrior, Infinis booster	The Infinis sigil, but is actually made up of two of them.	Summons a poison gas around an area that causes the victim to nearly choke to death.	Dark Equinox: Part Two	
	Slithering Worm	Infinis warrior, Yin booster	Same as the henge seen on Dreadcrow.	Sends out a dark spirit, in the form of a worm.	The One	
	Manifest	Yin-Infinis Guardian	Strangely, there are two henges. The first henge is the one that appears on the stone, which shows the Infinis joining the two Yin points at the top. The second henge is where the Infinis replaces the bottom bar of Yin, which is seen on Dreadcrow.	Summons Dreadcrow	The Road Less Travelled	
Rion	Silver Orb	Yin Warrior	The Yin sigil	Two effects. It either forms a shield bubble around Rion, or sends orbs at the attacker.	First Effect: - Second Effect: -	
	Oppressor	Yin Warrior, Nega Booster	The Nega sits right underneath Yin. Sometimes the Nega is thicker than the Yin as so not to confuse it with Argent Razor.	Generates a spherical device. This device drops a load of greenish sand on the target. Designed to either bury smaller creatures or to suppress certain substances (like the Zad's black tar devices)	Dark Equinox: Part One	
	Argent Magnet	Yin Warrior, Nega Booster	Same as Oppressor.	The effect is similar to Argent Lure, except that it is controlled via an energy ball.	The Healer	
	Guise of Pearl	Yin Warrior, Nega Booster, Nega Booster	The two Negas replace the bottom part of Yin.	It sends out orbs that cover Rion or ally, rendering them invisible to the naked eye.	-	
	Argent Grave	Yin Warrior, Nega Booster, Nega Booster	The two Negas act like extensions of the bottom horizontal bar of Yin.	Sends out silver energy and four stones in the form of a hand, which Rion controls.	-	
	Argent Drillhead	Yin Warrior, Nega Booster, Nega Booster	Same as Argent Grave.	It sends out an orb that causes blindness.	The Healer	
	Silver Membrane	Yin Warrior, Nega Booster, Nega Booster, Nega Booster	Similar to Guise of Pearl, except the last Nega sits underneath the Yin.	Two effects. It either covers the enemy within silver to petrify it. Or coats Rion in membrane, making him resistant to heat or fire.	First Effect: Dark Equinox: Part Two Second Effect: -	
	Argent Wildfire	Nega Warrior	The Nega sigil	Two effects. Both effects involve firing a flame arrow. But either the arrow will immolate the target, or form a cage of fire around the target.	First Effect: - Second Effect: -	
	Argent Razor	Nega Warrior, Yin Booster	Same as Oppressor, but the Nega is the same thickness as the Yin as so not to confuse the two.	Two effects. It either sends out stones that strike out, forming staircases or simply hit the target. Or rocks form around Rion, releasing energy around him in the shape of a drill-like device. In this form, he has the power to fly fast.	First effect: - Second Effect: Dark Equinox: Part One	
	Argent Lure	Nega Warrior, Yin Booster, Yin Booster	-	Two effects. It either hits a target, increasing their weight ten times that of normal. Or it creates a silver shield that draws any attacks to it.	First Effect: - Second Effect: -	
	Argent Warrior	Nega Warrior, Yin Booster, Yin Booster, Yin Booster	The three Yins form the top part of the Nega (two on the sides, one on top)	Rocks form a shield in a spinning plus sign formation (+). This can be either used for protection from attacks or can be sent out to deal damage.	The Healer	
	Argent Nemesis	Activates when Rion becomes enraged or excited	-	Gives Rion rock armor, for added protection. Rock forms around his arm for protection.	Dark Equinox: Part One	
	Arise	Yan-Nega Guardian	The vertical Yan bar is replaced by Nega.	Summons Arvengus	Dark Equinox: Part Two	
Kid Cole	Yin-winder	Warrior stone, sigil unknown (possibly Yin warrior)	Henge unknown	Description unknown, as all that was seen was a green ball of light.	The Town that Time Forgot	
	Nega Sandstorm	Stone cost unknown	Henge unknown	Same as Yin-winder	The Town that Time Forgot	
	Catcheous Draft	Dako Warrior, Nega Booster, Nega Booster	Same as Seth's Pandemonium, but the Negas appear at Dako's North and South instead of East and West.	Summons a huge net that has the ability to capture things or block a pathway.	The Town that Time Forgot	
	Scything Spur	Yin warrior, Nega booster	The Yin sits on top of the Nega	Sends out a series of spikes that are lethal to touch.	The Town that Time Forgot	
	Sandhand	Nega Warrior	The Nega sigil	Forms a hand in sand which Kid Cole has the ability to control.	The Town that Time Forgot	
	Blitz Attack	Nega Guardian	The Nega sigil	Summons Stinger	The Town that Time Forgot	
	Uncoil	Yin-Infinis-Nega Guardian	Same as Anaconduit, but the Yin is placed like the henge seen on Dreadcrow.	Summons Darkviper	The Magnificent Two	
Infinimora	Unknown	Yan, Altas, Yin. Stone types unknown.	The Altas is in the middle with the Yan on the top and the Yin on the bottom. The Yin overlaps the bottom of the Altas.	Summons three vipers that immobilize the target.	The Cycle	
	Unknown	Sum, Yin, Yan. Stone types unknown.	The Yin is in the middle with the Sum on top and the Yan on the bottom. The Yan acts as an extension of the bottom of the Yin.	Summons a beet-like plant that constricts the victim. The roots use the walls to latch onto the victim.	The Cycle	
Combo Spells (used by Defenders)	Warrior Henge (only four Defenders are needed)	Seth: Dako or Nega Warrior, Mel: Yan or Sum Warrior, Erik: Ogama or Infinis Warrior, Adam: Infinis Warrior (in place of Erik), Kara: Yin or Altas Warrior, Rion: Yin or Nega Warrior (in place of Kara)	The Warrior Henge consists of the first eight power sigils. It looks like an enormous Altas with Yin and Yan replacing the two vertical lines of Altas. Replacing the horizontal lines on the inside of the Altas is an extended Infinis. Nega is on the inside-right part of the Infinis. Sum is on the inside-left part of the Infinis. Finally, Ogama is underneath the Infinis and Dako is above it, still having space to fit inside the Altas.	Sacrifices the energy of the Defenders and their stones, to charge up one overloaded blast of energy, capable of decimiating or damaging the mightest of foes. The Defenders are left weak after this cast. Was also used to super-charge Kara with power when needed.	Trouble in Paradise	
	Tidal Tempest	Dako Aqua, Altas Aqua, Sum Aqua, Infinis Aqua	The Altas and Infinis are placed the same way as seen in the Warrior Henge. The Dako is beneath the Infinis while the Sum is sbove it.	Summons a lar/ge tidal wave that can crash and capsize just about anything over water.	Cast-Aways	
Doku	Blistering Diablo	Dako Warrior, Ogama Booster	Dako is connected to the top of Ogama	Sends out purple fire. Can ignite objects like rocks for added effects	The Healer	
	Venomous Barb	Ogama Warrior, Dako Booster, Dako Booster	The two Dakos are tilted diagonally to replace the one vertical Ogama line.	Sends out a swarm of parasitic maggots. Capable of poisoning the target if it's organic.	The Healer	
	Abborantus Ablaze	Dako-Nega Guardian	Same as Twisting Chaos	Summons Tormentor	The Healer	
Bo	Rock Shards	Dako Warrior	The Dako sigil	Sends out a series of rocks that can cut an opponent.	Warriors	
	Psybull	Dako Warrior, Ogama Booster, Ogama Booster (seen also as miscast with an extra Ogama Booster)	The Dako is turned horizontally. Two of the Ogamas are linked to it like Erik's Grand Mechanism. The third one is unknown, since this spell was miscast.	Two effects. It either encases the enemy in a mud cage. The second effect was miscast.	First Effect: Warriors Second Effect (miscast): Warriors	
	Shock Blast (name unclear)	Ogama Warrior, Dako Booster, Dako Booster	Same as Doku's Blistering Diablo, but there's an extra Dako underneath the first one, extending Ogama's vertical line.	Sends out a large electric ball which Bo has a limited amount of control over.	Warriors	
Malco (Order of Infinis)	Swarm of Locusts	Yin Warrior, Dako Booster, Dako Booster, Dako Booster	There is a Dako at Yin's North, east and west connection points.	Summons a large swarm of locusts, capable of devouring and breaking down materials like metal and guardians.	Knowledge	
	Shield Breakers	Yin Warrior, Dako Booster	The two Dakos are turned horizontal and replace the bottom horizontal line on Yin.	Sends out a flurry of explosive knives, designed to eradicate forms of energy like Guardians or shields	The Key to Victory	
	Meteor	Dako warrior, Yin booster, Yin booster, Yin booster	Similar to Kara's Bolt of Altas, except with Dako rather than Altas.	Sends a large flaming orb spiraling at the opponent. Malco can also direct this spell.	The Key to Victory	
	Concentration of Yin	Dako Warrior, Yin Booster	The Yin sits underneath the Dako to make it look as if the Yin has a third vertical line through it.	Summons small, burning orbs. Like Meteor, Malco has control over these orbs and where they can go.	Warriors	
	Spirit of Dako	Yin Warrior, Dako Booster	Same as Concentration of Yin	Enhances his hand with flame.	Vitus	
Snare	Swarm	Sum guardian	The Sum sigil	Summons Sliver	Snared	
General Hodd	Extreme Force	Ogama-Infinis Guardian	Same as Forge Fire	Summons Lockdown	Escape from Ogama-Gor	
One of Doku's Warlords	Backlash	Infinis Warrior, Yin Booster	Same as Flinch's Slithering Worm	Summons a pod with ropes coming out of the sides. The ropes latch onto the victim.	The Healer	
	Slithering Spine	Yin Warrior, Infinis Booster, Infinis Booster	Same as Flinch's Psyclone	Summons a few sets of vines in which the overlord can control.	The Healer	
	Fusion Attack	Yin-Yan Guardian	Same as Adam's Deceptor.	Summons Protozoa	The Healer	
The Tumble Twins	Flaming Baton	Nega Warrior, Ogama Booster, Ogama Booster, Ogama Booster	There is an Ogama located at Nega's north, west, and east.	Sends out a series of batons which confuse the enemy	Ms. Fortune	
Finn	Laugh Blast	Dako-Sum Guardian	Dako replaces the vertical line on Sum.	Summons Renvoldenn	Ms. Fortune	
	Bail Ring	Renvoldenn summoned, Dako booster	The Dako sigil	Releases a physical form of Dako. Has the ability to encase guardians and send them back into their stones.	Ms. Fortune	
Dark Malco (Ethos incarnation)	Black Torpedo	Yin Warrior, Dako booster	Same as Malco's Concentration of Yin, but the horizontal Yin line is visible.	Sends out a black energy spear, similar to Infinikizm's effect.	Malco Redux	
	Desolation	Yin Warrior, Dako booster	Same as Black Torpedo.	Same as Kid Cole's Catcheous Draft.	Malco Redux	
	Obliteration of Yin	Yin warrior, Dako booster	Same as Desolation	Starts out the same as Malco's Concentration of Yin, then turns into a series of purple waves which immobilize any target.	The Lost Children	
	Annihilator	Dako Warrior, Yin Booster, Yin Booster or Yin warrior, Dako booster, Dako booster	The Yins appear on the Dako's East and West or Same as Malco's Shield Breakers	Sends out a dark, black strip of fire which Dark Malco controls, similar to Malco's Meteor.	Malco Redux	
The Zad	Unknown	Warrior stone, sigil unknown	Henge unknown	Sends out a dark light that has the ability to burn anything the Zad want it to.	Dark Equinox: Part One	
	Unknown	Ethos warrior, Dako booster, Dako booster	The two bottom horizontal lines on Ethos are replaced by Dakos.	Two effects. Either sends a missile-like projectile that releases a muck-like substance that functions like quicksand, or releases three shadow spirits which the Zad can control.	First Effect: Dark Equinox: Part One Second Effect: -	
	Unknown	Ethos warrior, Dako booster, Dako booster, Dako booster	Same as the attack above, but with an extra Dako underneath.	Sends out the same muck-like substance like the attack above, but immobilizes the target and does not drown it.	-	
Lady K'Tahsh (does not use Di-Gata stones)	Tangling Labyrinth	N/A	N/A	Sends out three spiritual birds that K'Tahsh uses to capture things.	Von Faustien	
Kor Yin-an	Plague Shield	Yin warrior	The Yin sigil	Sends out a spiral of little insects which absorb any attack and fire it right back at the caster.	The Lost Children	
Roodu	Twisting Stalker	Nega warrior	The Nega sigil	Enhances Roodu's arms with long whips, similar to Seth's Twisting Chaos	Nightfall	

== Shared attacks ==
These sections have the attacks which more than one caster can use, no matter the sigils they possess.

Warp Whip This attack was first introduced in Dark Equinox: Part One when the Zads first captured Kara, but the name wasn't discovered until Malco Redux when Dark Malco stormed the monastery of Yan-Suma, looking for the Orb of Ogama-Yan. Only members of the Ethos use this attack. It is a long strip of material with a darkened end which the holder uses as a weapon via lashing.

Withdraw This is not an attack per se, but on the rare occasion a caster might call back their guardian to their holding place with this command.

Merge Form This is the attack that is called out when the caster wants to merge with his/her guardian.

== Defensive casts using shield stones ==
Shield stones are very good in combat against the Orders of Infinis. At some points in combating with the Ethos the shields are no use to the strong sigil energy of the Ethos' powers. Wizards of Yan do not always have to use shield stones. Sometimes he or she will be able to say a spell such as "Sum, Yan, Altas" then their shields are more stronger and enhanced because of their powers. Regular Rados people cannot summon stones from their bare hands. Wizards of Yan were all together and the people of the Order of Infinis were with them. Including Nazmul, in the episode Back Track they also had the army with them too when Melosa's Grandmother was still alive as a Wizard of Yan. These shield stones do a lot more and if someone has shield breakers (i.e.: Malco), the shield stones would be useless against those sigil power stones.

Vanguard Aegis Summons a shield that can withstand attacks. Requires any amount of shield stones, but attacks get weaker depending on cost. Can also stack or multiple users can form in a way to offer protection on all fronts (e.g. Ogama Defense formation in "The Road Less Travelled")

Fortified Front Summons a shield dome or group of shields that surround the caster, covers attacks from all angles, but not as effective in some cases.

Barricade Array Summons mini-shields of the sigil used. These shields can block small attacks, pick up smaller objects, deflect some spells or attack an enemy (Snare used this function against Adam). These shields are controlled by the caster.

Protector Much like Vanguard Aegis, but more fortified and joins with other Defenders.

Suffocating Sphere The only shield that attacks. It uses Barricade Array functionality, except can enclose an enemy and possibly disintegrate it, more potent against energy forms. Requires at least 2 Defenders to use.

Fortified Fortress Much like Fortified Front. It was used in the Episode Vitus and Melosa used it to defend Seth and herself against an old guardian guarding something near. It has two stones which will be able to last for some time, depending on how many shield stones you use.
