= The Twilight Saga =

The Twilight Saga may refer to:

- Twilight (novel series), a novel series by Stephenie Meyer
- The Twilight Saga (film series), a film series on based the novel series by Stephenie Meyer
- The Twilight Saga: The Official Illustrated Guide, a 2011 book by Stephenie Meyer

== See also ==
- Twilight (disambiguation)
- Twilight series (disambiguation)
