= Twilight series =

Twilight series may refer to:

- Twilight (comic book), a comic book miniseries by Howard Chaykin and José Luis García-López
- Twilight (novel series), a novel series by Stephenie Meyer
  - The Twilight Saga (film series), a film series based on the novel series
  - Twilight: The Graphic Novel, a graphic novel miniseries by Young Kim based on the novel Twilight
- Athens Twilight Criterium, also known the Twilight Series, a road bicycle race in Athens, Georgia

== See also ==
- Twilight (disambiguation)
- The Twilight Saga (disambiguation)
