= Yugure =

Yūgure, (夕暮れ, Japanese for 'twilight'), may refer to:

- Japanese destroyer Yūgure, the name of several Japanese ships
- "Yugure" (song), by The Blue Hearts
- Yūgure Maeda (1883–1951), a Japanese tanka poet

== See also ==
- Twilight (disambiguation)
- Yūgure made (夕暮まで), a 1980 Japanese film
