= Japanese destroyer Yūgure =

Three Japanese destroyers have been named Yūgure (夕暮 / ゆうぐれ, "twilight"):

- Japanese destroyer Yūgure (1905), a Kamikaze-class destroyer of the Imperial Japanese Navy during World War I
- Japanese destroyer Yūgure (1934), a Hatsuharu-class destroyer of the Imperial Japanese Navy during World War II
- JDS Yūgure (DD-184), an Ariake-class destroyer of the Japan Maritime Self-Defense Force, formerly USS Richard P. Leary (DD-664)

== See also ==
- Yugure (disambiguation)
