= Di-Gata Defenders =

- Di-Gata Defenders Logo
- Genre: Action; Adventure; Science fantasy
- Created by: Greg Collinson
- Directed by: Sean V. Jeffrey
- Starring: Noah Cappe; Martha MacIsaac; Dan Petronijevic; Lawrence Bayne; Ron Rubin; Sugar Lyn Beard; Jeremy From; Maurice Dean Wint; Juan Chioran; Alexander Conti
- Composer: Martin Kucaj
- Countries of origin: Canada; Luxembourg
- No. of seasons: 2
- No. of episodes: 52 (list of episodes)

Production
- Executive producers: Scott Dyer; Doug Murphy; Lilian Eche
- Running time: 22 minutes approx.
- Production companies: Nelvana Limited; LuxAnimation

Original release
- Network: Teletoon
- Release: August 5, 2006 – July 6, 2008

Di-Gata Defenders is an animated series created by Greg Collinson that was produced by Nelvana and LuxAnimation. The series follows the travels and adventures of six teenagers, part of an organization called the Di-Gata Defenders. Their mission as heroes is to defend RaDos against evil factions. The series aired for two seasons.

== Development ==
In 2005, Nelvana created a project called Funpak. It was designed to allow creators to pitch and create 5 minute interstitials. At the time, Greg Collinson did not plan on pitching anything for this project until a colleague of his discussed about it on a train ride. Collinson spent two weeks creating the series bible for his series idea, which was initially named Power Stone Warriors. In this bible, he planned out the prototype characters, factions, and the universe the series would take place in. Collinson later met with the executives at Nelvana and pitched his bible to them. Pleased with the promise this series had, Collinson was given the greenlight to produce this series with writer Ken Cuperus. The series then launched September 16, 2006 under its new name - Di-Gata Defenders.

== Broadcast ==
In the United States, the series aired on 4KidsTV. In January 2018, Disney XD (Canada) began to broadcast reruns of the show but was taken off the schedule on September 1, 2018 but put back on the schedule on March 14, 2022. Prior to that, it had been available on Bell and Roger's KidSuite in 2016. As of June 2022, Teletoon aired reruns of the show, but this channel has since ceased broadcasting.

== Setting ==
Di-Gata Defenders is set on the planet RaDos, inhabited by the RaDosians. The RaDosians originate from another planet and originally had dark skin, white hair, and blue eyes. The RaDosians were later struck with the Toten'Ka virus, which spread across the planet and killed millions. A small team of RaDosians escaped from their planet on a starship and crash landed on RaDos, where they evolved into human-like forms. RaDos's original inhabitants, an amphibious reptilian species called the Mortigarians, were forced into exile underwater.

The Di-Gata Mountains contain a mystical energy originating from the Primordials, mystical creatures whose energy leaked into the rocks when they died. The stones gained mystical powers and are used by the inhabitants of RaDos, divided into thirteen different forms called sigils.

The eponymous Di-Gata Defenders were assembled to oppose those who used the stones for evil. Among their ranks, the wizard Nazmul intended to achieve eternal life and establish his own rule in RaDos. As the Order continued to flourish, Nazmul recreated a guardian called the Megalith, forcing the Defenders to destroy his body and seal away Megalith. Four of the five children of the original Defenders were then taken to a secret dojo and trained to prepare for Megalith's return. When the children come of age, they destroy Megalith rather than seal it away again.

=== Organizations ===
- Order of Infinis - The Order of Infinis was formed by a corrupt Wizard of Yan, Nazmul, who sought power and eternal life. They were the main antagonists of Season 1. In the end, Nazmul was sealed away (eventually killed), Brackus was banished to the Dark Realm for high treason, and the Yin-Tos army was destroyed in a civil war at the Spell Zone. Flinch was believed to be the only surviving member of the Order, until Brackus was found out to still be alive and Flinch somehow managed to find Malco again. The duo made an alliance with the Ethos to free Nazmul. The high members of the Order were once allies of the Defenders and helped to defeat the Ethos.
- Ethos - Like the Order of Infinis, they are an organization with evil intentions. Long before the formation of the Order of Infinis, the Wizards of Yan imprisoned the Ethos in the Dark Realm, after the battle of Sum-Yan, using the Celestial Abyss. As part of their imprisonment, the Megalith was created as a result. When the Megalith was destroyed, it caused a force of energy powerful enough to release four Ethos back into Rados. Their plan is to merge both the Dark Realm and RaDos together, giving the Ethos what they desire: The Di-Gata energy they feed on, which will eliminate all life on the planet. They have made an alliance with the weakened Order of Infinis and have taken control over Malco.
- Wizards of Yan - The most powerful beings of Rados who hold enormous power. The Wizards were responsible for the creation of the Di-Gata Defenders to protect the Realm from evil. They were responsible for building the Machine of Binding, and the Celestial Abyss, as well as sealing away the Ethos and Megalith. Nowadays, they no longer exist except for a select few. Nazmul, Professor Alnar and Melosa including her grandmother are the only known Wizards.
- Rougon - The most hated hunters in all of the Realm. Rougon are human hunters and do anything for profit. Their base is located underwater, a perfect place for buying illegal items and other treasures. Their hideout was destroyed by the Defenders after the Yinicor was released from its prison.
- Di-Gata Defenders - The protectors of Rados formed by the Wizards of Yan to protect the realm and its people from those who would use its sigil energy for evil. However, many Defenders over the years were killed in the line of duty and some defected to the Order of Infinis. The current Defenders are Seth, Melosa, Erik, Rion, Adam and Kara and other notable Defenders were Rayald (killed by Malco), with Malco and the current Defenders' parents as former members.
- Yin-tos Army - They were once allies of the Wizards of Yan against the Ethos in the Battle of Yan-Suma, then a subgroup of the Order of Infinis forces. These are mercenaries who are motivated by money and will go to any means to acquire it, but in the past were courageous warriors who fought to protect RaDos from evil. They swore allegiance to Brackus and were under the sub-command of General Rube. After the collapse of the Order, some of the Yin-tos soldiers went to work for the Ethos.
- Gatashin Monks - The group of monks who carried out quite a few tasks involving the Pure Stones. Four monks each carried a Pure Stone and hid it away, and some took the young Defenders to the Dojo, with the exception of Adam. The Key was hidden in the Amos-Yan Monastery, and guarded by the monks. A sub-sect of these monks also operate the Gatashin Prison, used to contain criminals that use RaDos' power for evil.
- The Zad - A race of humanoid ant-eaters. They serve and carry out the will of Ethos.
- Yan-Nega class Wizards - They are wizards from the time of the Ethos. Kor Yin-an, a Yan-Nega class wizard who was with the Wizards at the Battle of Yan-Suma, wanted to betray them so he could plead for his life, but was locked in a tomb for his betrayal.
- Ogaman Federation - A group that Aaron the Hunter served with. They were formerly in possession of the Tome of Al-mortigar.

=== Stones ===
Di-Gata Stones draw upon the mystic energy that simmers below the surface of the realm, and unleash it in the form of pure power. Each warrior has a different arsenal of Di-Gata stones. In battle, a warrior must choose how to use his stones to maximum effect, analyzing and opponent's strengths and weaknesses and deciding when to unleash their most powerful attacks.

There are nine types of stones, each having a different role of a Di-Gata battle.

- Shield Stones - These defensive stones are used to protect the caster from an opponent's attack.
- Guardian Stones - These stones house powerful creatures known as Guardians.
- Warrior Stones - A Warrior Stone exudes energy in many different forms. In battle, warrior stones are combined with booster stones for an additional burst of power.
- Booster Stones - These stones are used to enhance and strengthen the effect of the Warrior Stone.
- Champion (Henge) Stones - Rare stones that are powerful and never fail when cast..
- Aqua Stones - Aqua Stones are the only stones able to be used in water; all other sigils require land to draw power from.
- Pure Stones - The four Di-Gata stones used to bind Megalith.
- Nostrum Vitae Stone - First mentioned in "The Healer", Brackus uses Nostrum Vitae to turn Tormentor to dust.
- Wizard Stone - Carved by Mel's grandmother, these stones were created to lead the user to an Icon by giving the a vision of the location

=== Sigils ===
Sigils are used to tap into a unique aspect of the realm's energy through the Di-Gata Stones. Individually, each Sigil is capable of unleashing a burst of raw energy, but when used in combination with each other, the energy aspects blend together to form a Henge. Not only does this create a far greater concentration of power, it also allows access to other kinds of destructive or helpful powers. These sigils are also inscribed on various locations, objects, articles of clothing and sometimes as birthmarks or tattoos on the people's faces (like Brackus' Infinis tattoo on his forehead).To study the Sigils one must first realize that no sigil is evil and no sigil is good. The sigils transcend these moralistic notions, they represent parts of the whole and could never exist without their opposites. It is through the combination of Sigils that one creates true power, this is why pupils focus their study on two sigils, a single sigil is of limited value and power on its own.

=== Technology ===
- The Key is a blue stone engraved with Yan sigils that can detect energy.
- Erik's gauntlet is a gauntlet used by Erik that can activate stones and machines. In the episode "Ms. Fortune", the gauntlet gave Erik superhuman strength, which faded after it lost power. Later in the series, the gauntlet is given the ability to absorb and redirect energy.
- The Yan-Altas Container is a device designed to hold the Pure stones to shield them from being found by the Key. It is made from a rock called Ultimite, which can absorb magical essence.
- The Sigil Stormer is the main transport for the current Defenders to travel around Rados. They are also known as "Bikes".
- The Replicator Stone is a machine that can create a limitless supply of squid-like Obelisk robot. When Brackus orders the machine to be shut down, it overloads and gains sentience. The Replicator attempts to destroy Rados until it is shut down by Flinch.
- The Machine of Binding was used to activate the power of the Pure Stones to seal the Megalith. However, it had no control over the outside damage the seal would cause.
- The Shift Stone is both a timer and a key. Six of the eight sigils are engraved on each face of the stone, and rotate as time goes on. When all the sigils are aligned, the timer reaches 0 and Rados has an equinox. At this point, the device can be used as a key at the Shift Beacon to open a portal to the Dark Realm.
- The Celestial Abyss is a superweapon created by Flinch to banish the Ethos to the Dark Realm.
- The Guardianizer is a rifle-sized weapon created by Si'i that can absorb Guarudians and use their parts to create a mutant guardian made up of both body and sigil parts of the original guardians used.
- The Dakonauts are flying one-eyed robots that serve Nazmul.
- Seth's Mech arm is a robotic rock arm made by Erik so Seth could remain a Defender after sacrificing his hand to Brackus. Seth later receives a second arm that can transform into a cannon using the stones' power.
- The Wizard Towers are castles created for the Wizards of Yan to reconnect with the sky.

=== Henge/Champion Stones ===
- The Phase Stone is a stone that turns surfaces intangible when thrown into them, allowing the user to move through the surface as if it did not exist.
- The Nova Stone is a powerful stone with the ability to emit beams of energy. It was used as a vessel for Nazmul's spirit.
- The Flawed Stone is a stone with the ability to create mental illusions, making others see false visions.
- The Tracking Stone is a stone used by Adam to track down Brackus.
- The Transporter Stone is a transport system used in the Bakorian cycle.
- The Shaman's Stone is a stone used by the shaman to absorb an attack. A creature somewhat similar to the absorbed attack emerges from the stone and attacks Malco.
- The Eternity Stone is a stone that Mel used to travel back in time.
- The Annihilator Stone is a superweapon with enough raw power to eradicate any life form or structure within a ten-mile radius. After the stone is activated by accident, Erik uses his Energy Bider to fire the energy into the sky, preventing disaster.

== Games ==
There were four online games available for the show:

1. Di-Gata Sigil Shooter
2. DiGata Defenders: Invasion of Infinis
3. Power Stone Combat
4. Di-Gata Battle Training

The ATV and Battle games were also available on Teletoon.com while the show was airing.

In Di-Gata Online, they have four provinces unlocked, each containing a quest and re-playable mini-game after finishing the quest for that province. The battle arena is currently playable, but it has some bugs in it.

Di-Gata.com also released a battle training game based on the trading cards and stones game. It had four quests open and cost $15 CDN to get involved.

There was also a game produced for the Nintendo DS.
