= Twilight, Ohio County, West Virginia =

Twilight, West Virginia
- Unincorporated community
- Location within West Virginia Location within the United States
- Coordinates: 40°02′10″N 80°35′36″W
- Country: United States
- State: West Virginia
- County: Ohio
- Elevation: 804 ft (245 m)
- Time zone: UTC-5 (Eastern (EST))
  - Summer (DST): UTC-4 (EDT)
- Area codes: 304 & 681
- GNIS feature ID: 1549961

Twilight is an unincorporated community along Middle Wheeling Creek in Ohio County, West Virginia, United States. Twilight is located on Middle Creek Road, County Route 39, 2.2 miles (3.5 km) east-southeast of Triadelphia.

A post office was located at Twilight from 1894 to 1902, when it was discontinued, and the mail redirected to Triadelphia. A 1902 USGS topographical survey map shows about ten houses or other buildings at Twilight; there were about sixteen in 1997.
