= List of Di-Gata Defenders episodes =

Between the Megalith and Ethos Sagas, there are a total of 52 episodes of Di-Gata Defenders. There was supposed to be a third season, but the series was cancelled. Dates shown are original airdates on Teletoon.

== Season 1: The Megalith Saga ==
The first three episodes were shown as a 90-minute sneak preview on August 5, 2006.

=== Episode 1: Trouble in Paradise ===
August 12, 2006
The Defenders' secret training is interrupted when an earthquake signals the monstrously evil Megalith is breaking free. Their mentor, Professor Alnar, tells them they must immediately embark on a dangerous mission to re-imprison the Megalith by recovering the four Pure Stones. Before the Defenders can leave the Dojo and start on their epic quest they are attacked by a vicious Rock Serpent and must face their first full on Di-Gata Battle!

=== Episode 2: The Road Less Traveled ===
August 19, 2006
On their way to the Monastery of Amos-Yan to recover The Key, a device which will lead them to the four pure stones, Seth and his fellow Di-Gata Defenders are ambushed by a band of thieves. The inexperienced Defenders find themselves trapped and only escape with the aid of the roguish and mysterious Adam. Seth is skeptical and jealous of this mysterious newcomer and suspects he's a thief as well, driving him away but not before Adam took a "souvenir" - Seth's Nova stone. Meanwhile, agents of the Order of Infinis, an organization intent on releasing the Megalith, arrive at the monastery ahead of the Defenders. A bridge the Defenders cross breaks. Kara, Seth, and Erik, make it across before the bridge totally collapses, leaving Mel to cross the swamp on foot and meet the others at the Monastery. Mel is ambushed by swamp-dwelling Amphitigons and her stones are knocked into the water, but she is saved by Adam. They make it out of the swamp where the Amphitigons ambush them again, revealing Adam paid them to attack Mel so he could come to their rescue. They attack Adam and he gives them proper payment, the Nova Stone. Mel furiously leaves him and meets up with the other Defenders. When they arrive, they find the Monastery has been destroyed.

=== Episode 3: The Key to Victory ===
August 26, 2006
The Monastery burns as Malco and Flinch tear it apart looking for The Key. With the help of a bizarre creature named Zad, the Defenders sneak into the monastery and split up to find the Key. Meanwhile, Adam runs into the beasts from earlier and takes back the Nova Stone when they refuse to return it. He arrives at the monastery as Mel is being attacked by Flinch and saves her (again), then apologizes for lying. Seth and Kara find the Elder Priestess of the monastery, who leads them to the Key. Malco and Flinch (who had by then escaped from Adam and Mel) arrive, and Flinch traps the Defenders in a force field. Erik knocks out Flinch by slipping a booster stone into his electronic backpack, electrocuting him, then sets the others free. Malco challenges them to a fight, which Mel and Adam arrive just in time for. Malco is so strong however, even Warrior Henge doesn't defeat him. Cornered, Seth uses the Nova Stone, which Adam gladly hands over. It defeats Malco but the backwash nearly demolishes the monastery. Flinch grabs the Key, but when he finds himself outnumbered, destroys it and escapes. The Elder Priestess reveals she had the real Key all along. Now the Defenders are ready to search for the Pure Stones.

=== Episode 4: Snared ===
September 3, 2006
While travelling with Adam (whom they met in Episode 2) Seth becomes annoyed at him and challenges him to a duel. While they're away, Mel, Eric, and Kara are attacked and defeated by the bounty hunter, Snare.

=== Episode 5: Ms. Fortune ===
September 10, 2006
The Defenders come across a carnival. The circus misfits end up controlling Erik through an amulet. Mel goes to investigate and it turns out that both the circus members and Erik are being controlled by another creature.

=== Episode 6: Cast-Aways ===
September 17, 2006
For the first time in their lives, the Defenders find themselves on the high seas, where they discover their Di-Gata stones don't work over water. When bandits attack the ship they are traveling on, their friendly captain proves to be more than he appears. Mel shows her Wizard of Yan powers for the first time.

=== Episode 7: Escape from Ogama-Gor ===
September 24, 2006
A walled city held in the grasp of a ruthless dictator has a dark secret: Its own citizens are being used as energy for the Dictator's crazed ambitions. For Kara, the situation becomes personal when her Guardian, V-Moth, is taken prisoner.

=== Episode 8: A Flaw in the Ointment ===
October 1, 2006
Seth learns the hard way that looks can be deceiving when the attentions of a pretty girl lead the Defenders to face destruction in the village of Happy Vale where, literally, nothing is as it seems. The key falls into the hands of the Order of Infinis.

=== Episode 9: Vitus ===
October 8, 2006
Deep in the bowels of an abandoned mine, the Defenders uncover a secret destined to shake the entire realm of Rados to its foundations: The existence of a Ninth Sigil. It does not take long before the evil Lord Nazmul sends his agents Malco and Flinch to claim it for the Order of Infinis.

=== Episode 10: The Town That Time Forgot ===
October 15, 2006
The Defenders try to find a place to rest, but are turned down everywhere as a group of bandits led by Kid Cole have been framing their attacks on the Defenders. Mel is captured by the bandits when they enter a village under Kid Cole's command, one of whom turns out to be Adam, who frees her. The other Guardians return, only for all of them to flee to a hidden dojo Mel locates. Seth accepts a one-on-one duel with Kid Cole, but quickly finds himself outnumbered six-to-one. The others are locked in the dojo until Adam shows the others his Champion Stone: the Phase Stone, which lets them walk through the walls and even the odds.

=== Episode 11: Carved in Stone ===
October 22, 2006
Deep inside a mountain at the roof of the world, the Defenders encounter Brim, the original carver of the pure stones, now living in self-imposed exile and under siege by evil Guardians. The Defenders remind him of the optimism he once held for human life and he promises to make Seth a rare and precious gift - the Vitus stone. To make it they need a Wizard of Yan, but all are destroyed, until Mel reveals she is one. Brim states a Champion Stone must be sacrificed to make one: the Nova Stone. They get the Vitus Stone, leaving them to think the Nova Stone is no more, but Brim has fooled them and taken it for himself.

=== Episode 12: The One ===
November 1, 2006
The Defenders close in on the first pure stone. Their quest takes them to a remote jungle village where Erik is hailed as a Shaman, thereby making him an enemy of the tribe's medicine man. As they try to gain information from the tribe about the pure stone, the defenders enter a showdown with Malco and Flinch.

=== Episode 13: One Down ===
November 5, 2006
The Defenders find the way to the pure stone, and eventually find themselves in a maze. Mel picks up the Pure Stone, only to be possessed by the Megalith's energy and fall into a coma. When the others find her, the Dakonauts (Lord Nazmul's unstoppable robotic army) attack.

=== Episode 14: Doom Chase ===
November 10, 2006
Mel and Erik have eluded pursuers, who track them with the Key and the Pure Stone they have, and are hiding while Mel recuperates. Seth has struck a deal with Doku, an embittered wizard who promises him the location of Nazmul's secret keep in exchange for Seth's word he will destroy Brakus. To make sure that Seth holds up his end of the bargain, Doku reveals he is holding Kara hostage. She has already been infected with poison of the Saviped scorpion, which will kill her in six hours.

=== Episode 15: Warriors ===
November 10, 2006
On the run from Malco and Flinch and their allies, Mel and Erik encounter Bo, a brash young stone slinger who tells them of a warrior cult competition held nearby. They quickly realize the trophy is nothing other than one of the pure stones. Mel and Erik make their way into the heart of the enemy camp and fight their way to the trophy while Seth searches for a cure for Kara.

=== Episode 16: Knowledge ===
November 26, 2006
Mel dreams of a long lost monastery and a pure stone hidden there. Nazmul is able to read her dream and decides it is Mel - the possessor of such power - whose body he must have as the host for his incorporeal being. He dispatches Malco and Flinch to kidnap Mel, unaware Brackus has stolen the key and has gone to the monastery to take possession of the pure stone for himself. Brackus gets away with the pure stone, but the Defenders have retaken the Key.

=== Episode 17: Den of Thieves ===
January 7, 2007
Eluding bounty hunters, Adam charms his way into the Defenders’ encampment only to steal away in the night with their pure stones. His trail leads the Defenders to a den of thieves where an arms auction is being held with the main attraction the prized pure stone. After tricking their way into the camp, Mel is captured, and the Defenders are in disarray until Adam steps up to help.

=== Episode 18: Nexus ===
January 14, 2007
The Defenders head for the legendary Nexus - a traditional place of healing for Di-Gata Defenders - but it is not what it seems. Kali, a shape shifting agent of Nazmul, has been charged with obtaining a body host for him. Disguising herself as the Keeper of the Nexus, she welcomes them inside. As Kara's own powers start to manifest, Kali decides Kara, not Mel, should be the one Nazmul seeks.

=== Episode 19: Replication ===
January 21, 2007
Barely escaping the Nexus with their lives, the Defenders set out for the Pinnacle, an ancient Di-Gata training temple. On the way, they face the Obelisks, an army of war machines created for Nazmul by Flinch. Erik and Kara stay behind to try to stop the destruction while Seth and Mel head for the Pinnacle to cure Mel of her wizard attacks. At the Pinnacle, Seth must face Omniaxor, his father's Guardian. When Seth brings out his guardian, Kragus, Omniaxor breaks him into little pieces. Seth then realizes that Kragus' stone never came back and he has been destroyed.

=== Episode 20: Dark Descent ===
January 28, 2007
The Defenders discover the Machine of Binding and Erik devises a plan to re-wire the machine to draw the pure stones to it. Their plan is foiled by an attack and as Erik lies gravely ill, a strange metamorphosis is taking place within Seth.

=== Episode 21: The Cycle ===
March 18, 2007
Nazmul has undertaken a quest for immortality that sends his team to an underground palace which once housed an ancient King rumored to have achieved eternal life. The Defenders arrive to rescue Kara, who has been taken by the King to be used as a new host. In the process they discover the Megalith was sealed away millennia ago, not twelve, and it has been rebound many times. Was rebinding the Megalith the right thing to do? Did they dare defy the traditions they had been taught since their training began?

=== Episode 22: What Lies Beneath ===
March 25, 2007
The Defenders stop to help a caravan of refugees fleeing the war ravaged countryside for the safety of the Arboth. Brackus and his Mercenaries descend on Arboth, having identified it as the source from which the pure stones were carved. Seth deserts the Defenders as they attempt to help the peaceful Arbothians repel the invaders.

=== Episode 23: The Returning ===
April 20, 2007
The Defenders locate the third pure stone hidden in the sacred floating city of Callisto, but the presence of almost invincible Guardians makes its capture almost impossible. Only the Nova Stone can defeat it, which they no longer have.

=== Episode 24: Adam and Eve of Destruction ===
April 20, 2007
In a surprise turn of events, Adam shows up at Brackus’ safe house with the four pure stones and Kara all tied up. Kara is taken for a host body transfer to give Nazmul physical form but Nazmul refuses to trust Adam and locks him up. An enraged Seth leads an all-out assault on the castle. Kara escapes and runs into Adam, who had escaped with the phase and nova stones and reveals he had planned to let Nazmal to possess her so he could imprison Nazmul in the Nova stone, but stopped when he learned that could kill the host. He also reveals Brackus was his father, but Nazmul shows up, saying Brackus was not, though he had destroyed Adam's real parents twelve years ago. Kara realizes Adam is a Defender. Nazmul attempts to possess Kara, though Adam tries, in vain, to hold him off. The Defenders charge in and Omniaxor cripples Nazmul. They take Kara and the Pure Stones back, Adam accompanying them to the place of binding. Brackus pushes forward his own plans.

=== Episode 25: Perfect Host ===
April 20, 2007
With Nazmul maimed and the Order of Infinis a wreck, Brackus takes command of the army and pursues the Defenders to the Spell Zone. Meanwhile, Mel, Kara, and Eric go into the dojo to talk to Professor Alnar, Adam and Seth stay outside of the dojo because Seth is merged with Kragus and Adam was not trained as a Defender. They talk about random things until Seth says Mel likes Adam, which makes Adam grin happily and Seth regret saying that. In a shocking twist, Nazmul finds the perfect host: not Mel or Kara, but Malco. The Infinis Civil War and the final battle for control of RaDos rages on in the Spell Zone. However, amid the mayhem, the Megalith is freed and the Pure Stones destroyed.

=== Episode 26: Ethos ===
April 20, 2007
The Defenders have refused to recast the Spell of Binding as it would have destroyed the planet, which led to the Megalith reforming. The Defenders head to a nearby farm to recover energy, still exhausted from fighting the Yintos Army. Near the Spell Zone, a young boy with white hair watches as the Defenders evacuate. The Megalith possesses the old woman who owns the farm and separates him from Kragus, who begins to fade away. Seeing the bond between Seth and Kragus, Omniaxor appears and merges his spirit with Kragus to save his life, giving Seth a new Guardian: Omnikragg. Melosa is able to cure the old woman and the Guardians pursue the Megalith to Arboth, where it is going to feed. Using Flinch's teleportation system, the group quickly reaches Arboth. The Megalith is now ready to fight and beats them back, knocking Eric unconscious. Seth has Adam take Erik's place as the fourth Defender and they form Warrior Henge, channeling the energy through Kara. The Megalith survives the onslaught and takes Kara. Before it can eat her, Seth casts the Nova Stone at Kara, who channels its energy and destroys the Megalith. Eric regains consciousness in time to save Kara from being crushed by the Megalith's body. Its body vanishes, releasing the energy back to RaDos. The young boy approaches when Seth says it's over, saying it's only just begun. The boy brings Alnar forth, who introduces him as Rion and explains the Wizards of Yan banished a group of energy eaters called the Ethos to the Dark Realm, which resulted in the Megalith's birth. Rion is the key to defeating the Ethos, whose emissaries have already returned to RaDos. The three emissaries are then shown at a portal to the dark realm and give Zad a shift stone, saying he knew what to do.

== Season 2: The Ethos Saga ==
=== Episode 27: Dark Equinox, Part One ===
September 3, 2007
The Megalith has been destroyed and the Order is in shambles. The new defender, Rion, joins the group and helps rebuild Arboth, though soon complains about how he lacks a Guardian as the others' help. Adam and Mel have a small fight over whether Adam is going to stay, but ends when they almost kiss - though Zad interrupts the moment, having captured Kara. During the fight, due to Rion's inexperience and hardheadedness, Kara is brought to the Dark Realm. Zad is eventually defeated and sinks into the confines of his own spell, leaving the Shift Stone behind. Rion takes them to his teacher Tzur for help. Meanwhile, Kara meets Madame Leizel, now a wraith, who tells her to go to the Tower of Nowa. She meets and reluctantly teams up with Brackus to find the tower. The Defenders approach an ancient valley but notice a fight has occurred. Tzur, a two-faced rock giant, emerges. Tzur explains that when the Defenders destroyed the Megalith, the energy unleashed opened a portal between RaDos to the Dark Realm, which the Ethos hope to reopen with the Shift Stone. The Zads attack to reclaim the Shift Stone and Tzur hands Rion a stone, using another to open a portal and saying they will find other Defenders at the temple on the other side. Rion refuses to leave Tzur, but when he is killed in the fighting, Rion transforms into a darker entity and defeats the Zads. Unable to do anything else, they go through the portal.

=== Episode 28: Dark Equinox, Part Two ===
September 16, 2007
Malco and Flinch have stolen the Nova stone to free Nazmul but have no success. On the day of the equinox, the Defenders find the portal to the Dark Realm as well as objects that belonged to their parents. In the Dark Realm, Brackus betrays Kara and tries to escape first, but is left to contend with the wrath of Leizel. In Rados, the Defenders are attacked by the Zads. Adam stays to hold them off, shoves Rion after the others when he volunteers to help, and barricades the tunnel. They open the portal while Kara simultaneously places her boots and Warrior stone at the Tower of Nowa, but the Ethos in Rados try to keep the Defenders from saving Kara and closing the portal. Using powerful attacks, the Ethos fuse the Shift Stone to its beacon. Erik wishes that they had those other Defenders Tzur mentioned but Seth notices Erik's father's tools and realizes their parents are the others. While Erik uses the tools to pry out the Shift Stone, Mel activates a device belonging to her mother, which repels the Ethos. Brackus, who has lost an eye, tries to get rid of Kara for good but is thrown into a swarm of wraiths thanks to Rion and his new guardian, Arvengus. As they get out, Erik gets the Shift Stone off its pedestal, sealing the portal. With the other Ethos imprisoned, Alnar sends Kara for special training while Rion stays with the others. Meanwhile, the Ethos make an alliance with Malco and Flinch and declare the battle for Rados has just begun.

=== Episode 29: The Healer ===
September 23, 2007
The Defenders find their new dojo, but it turns out that it needs a little work and cleanup. Erik and Mel are in the library when they find a reserver stone, which has recorded Doku and his fellow warlords in their discussion about taking over RaDos. Rion jumps the gun and causes a battle to break out when they arrive, leaving Seth poisoned at the hands of Doku. They follow rumors to a healer, who turns out to be Brackus suffering from amnesia and carrying a stone with healing powers. He heals Seth and saves the Defenders in the rematch with the warlords by buying the Defenders time to escape and destroying Doku's guardian. The Defenders let Brackus tag along, though only Rion trusts him. Malco begins to pound the Nova Stone on a tree stump despite Flinch's objections it won't just crack - or will it?

=== Episode 30: Guardians for Sale ===
September 30, 2007
A monstrous Guardian appears at the dojo but Bo appears as the Defenders go to fight it, claiming it's his Guardian he's now a Defender, but it goes wild and they must defeat it. They track the source to Si'i, a black market guardian salesman. The defenders have to face mutant guardians and Si'i crafts all their guardians together. The beast runs off after Brackus, channeling their Defenders' distrust over him. Rion and Mel save Brackus and Erik and Seth find a way to separate their guardians. Rion uses ancient language of the guardians to calm them until Seth separates them. Si'i then recognizes Brackus as a customer who ordered a guardian capable of wiping out the defenders, which Brackus denies.

=== Episode 31: The Magnificent Two ===
October 7, 2007
The Defenders seek to recover the Nova Stone, leaving Erik to train Rion while Seth and Melosa search. Kid Cole takes over a mine to make a set of unbreakable armor and a new Guardian, Dark Viper, one of Si'i's mutant Guardians and a twisted version of Anaconduit. Erik and Rion respond to the distress call. With Brackus's help, as Anaconduit was once his Guardian, Kid Cole is defeated. When Dark Viper returns to Brackus, the warlord's missing memories also return.

=== Episode 32: Regenesis ===
October 14, 2007
The Defenders reunite at Port Reevus, now in search of Brim, who has been released from the Dark Realm and is imprisoned. The Defenders, with help from Brackus, defeat a twisted version of the Doomhunter to escape with Brim, although Seth is almost dragged into his prison, saved by Brackus. However, Malco and Flinch escape with Brim. A Tracker stone leads the Defenders to Mount Froza, where a special crystal is required to cut open the Nova Stone and free Nazmul. Brackus, memories restored, temporarily ditches the Defenders (who were trapped until an avalanche) to "settle the score" with his old friends. Nazmul is released by absorbing a large part of Malco's energy, but is destroyed when Brackus separates him from the Nova Stone, his power source. The Ethos later find Malco's weakened body and figure he might be of use.

=== Episode 33: Malco Redux ===
October 19, 2007
The Ethos emissaries use their power to merge with Malco, giving him a tainted color and purple sigil designs, speaking for the first time. Meanwhile, the Defenders try to find why Rion turns dark. Melosa discovers the existence of an old monastery at Yan-Suma where the Wizards of Yan first banished the Ethos. Given a riddle and staff from a cloaked old man, the Defenders rediscover the buried monastery with a disk from Aaron and the Warrior Henge. They are attacked by Malco and Flinch and Rion gets impaled by shrapnel, forcing Erik to take him to Brackus. Seth and Mel proceed while Omnikragg holds off Malco. They discover the Orb of Ogama-Yan that, if aligned with five other Yan objects, can protect Rados from the Dark Realm. However, Malco throws Seth and Mel into a bottomless well to get the orb, the monastery collapsing. As he throws the two into the well, the monastery crumbles around them. The two survive thanks to the staff and walk into a tunnel, not knowing the old man, baring his fangs, was following them.

=== Episode 34: Back Track ===
October 28, 2007
Erik, Rion and Brackus come upon the wreckage of the monastery, where they find Seth and Mel. Meanwhile, Flinch orders the Zads to take care of the remaining Defenders. Mel reveals she took an eternity stone from the monastery, and Brackus and Rion explain a wizard could use their powers with one to travel through time. Time travel is to be done with caution to avoid tampering with history. Mel doesn't heed their warnings and travels to the siege of Yan-Suma, meeting her grandmother. At this point of time, the Order of Infinis and Yintos army are allied with the Wizards, but Mel doesn't know that and thinks Nazmul is trying to help the Ethos and freezes the weapon meant to stop the Ethos, the Celestial Abyss. This changes the future, making the Zad become bigger and more vicious. In the monastery, the Defenders and Brackus (somehow not affected by the changes) find a tablet dictating how the Ethos used illusions to sneak into the monastery via tunnels. Using Eric's knowledge of time, he sends a message to Mel in the past via Robotus, warning her of the ambush. Mel passes on the warning to the Wizards of Yan and they set a trap within a temple, this time managing to use the Celestial Abyss to defeat the Ethos. Kor-Yinan, the Wizard who told the Ethos of the tunnel, is apprehended. The future is restored and the modified Zad disappear. Mel's grandmother gives Mel five stones so she can find the icons (the name given to the Celestial Abyss pieces). Mel returns to the present with the Eternity Stone and reunites with the Defenders.

=== Episode 35: We're No Guardian Angels ===
November 4, 2007
Seth and Rion have a large dispute after Brackus goes on a trip so Seth leaves Rion at the temple when the rest of the Defenders respond to a distress signal from the Gatashin Prison where Zads have kidnap Si'i. Malco wants information about modifying Si'i's Guardianizer as he wants to control Rion, who is a threat, by turning him into a Guardian. Rion responds to a second distress signal, which is a trap. He is hit by the modified Guardianizer and turns into a mutant guardian, going berserk and wrecking a nearby town. The Defenders find them and catch a fleeing Flinch, who tells them what happened. They need to lure Rion to the Guardianizer to turn him back so Seth offers to be turned into a Guardian, his mind protected by Mel. He confronts Rion and forces him to calm down, bringing him back to the Guardianizer. The Ethos have reclaimed the device but the arrival of Guardian Seth and Rion cause chaos to break out. Both are returned to their original forms. In the chaos, Si'i is struck with falling debris and falls into a lava pool with the Guardianizer, whose final use turns him into a mutant Guardian. He flies away. Seth and Rion make up.

=== Episode 36: Von Faustien ===
November 11, 2007
Mel finds the location of the first Icon in the Tomb of Yan-Mara, but the dojo's warning systems pick up a disturbance in a harbor town, which turns out to be a man named Von Faustien, using a special gun to defeat a rampaging creature he calls a Sigil Slayer, an Ethos war dog. After he defeats it, Von Faustien tell them a leftover Sigil Slayer killed his family and he has dedicated his life to hunting down the remaining beasts, even if it means hurting other in the process. He agrees to help the Defenders and takes them to the tomb only to find a woman, Lady K'tash, waiting for them. While the other struggle to stop her, Seth uses his visor to pick the icon from a shelf of artifacts. When he turns around with it, he sees an Ethos is inside her and Von Faustien, horrifying the hunter. K'tash takes the Icon and unleashes the tomb's Guardian. By the time they defeat it, Von Faustien has already left to chase after K'tash, but Seth has put a tracer on his vehicle. Von Faustien threatens to use an Annihilator Stone to kill K'tash, which will also kill everything in a ten-mile radius. The Defenders arrive, figuring out the Ethos in him was what caused his wild behavior. However, K'tash awakens the Ethos in Von Faustien, who activates the Annihilator as he collapses. Erik shoots Von Faustien with his own gun before he leaves with K'tash, returning him to human, but he cannot shut down the Annihilator Stone. Erik uses his gauntlet and a crystal Von Faustien had earlier given him to redirect the stone's energy harmlessly into the sky. K'tash meanwhile, brings the Icon to Malco, who thinks of his plan to convert Rion to the Ethos.

=== Episode 37: Notes from the Underground ===
November 25, 2007
Kara sneaks into Malco's base and steals the Orb of Ogama-Yan. Mel fails to work the wizard stones but they react to Seth, who directs them to a desert. When Malco discovers the Orb is missing, he seeks out Kor-Yinan, who has been imprisoned in a state of undeath following his betrayal. Malco asks for the next location of the Icon in exchange for revenge against Melosa. The Defenders arrive, only to sink into the ground. Seth meets a young girl named Jeo and saves her from giant worms. She brings him to her home where her grandmother has the other Defenders hostage, though they're released. Jeo shows Seth the next Icon, which she and her grandmother call the Source, the means keeping them alive underground. Knowing what would happen if the Ethos got it first, Seth distracts Jeo while the rest go for the Icon. They're confronted by Kor-Yinan, who easily defeats them with his powers. However, Kara appears to Mel and returns the Tracking Stones to her, which Mel uses to create armor and duel with Kor-Yinan. She defeats him, but hesitates to kill him, letting him escape with the Icon. The underground settlement starts to collapse but Mel uses her powers to bring it to the surface, letting Jeo see the upper world for the first time. Mel mentions seeing Kara, but as no one else did, writes it off as an illusion. In a nearby tree, Kara watches them before disappearing.

=== Episode 38: The Horn of Neglos ===
December 2, 2007
Lady K'Tash awakens the giant golem, Atagor-Am and implants a Champion stone in Seth's right hand, hampering his abilities to cast spells and his health. The Defenders search for Brackus for help, going to a dessert town where a merchant tells them of another healer, Adaham. Adaham turns out to be Adam, who is no healer but is enjoying his life in luxury. Atagor-Am tracks the Defenders to the town and attacks them. The stone in Seth's hand prevents him from being able to cast but Mel steps in front of Seth, causing Atagor-Am to pause and call her Gatanou. He then grabs Adam. Brackus is indeed in town, speaking to Flinch about plans to overthrow Malco and become RaDos's ruler. Atagor-Am destroys the pub they're in and Brackus sees Adam in danger. He runs to help him as Flinch flees and turns the giant to sand. He is startled to see all the Defenders there. Brackus tells them the giant will soon reform and that it once preyed on towns searching for a suitable host for his bride's spirit. Atagor-Am reforms and knocks them off their Sigil Stormers, kidnapping Mel. Mel awakens in a cave chained to an arch and a woman's spirit rises from a coffin to Mel. The others reach the giant's cave and see the spirit of Gatanou about to possess Mel. Mel is unable to summon Draykor, as a guard is locked onto her amulet. They again battle and learn its weakness, a pair of urns that contained its spiritual essence, which they try to destroy, only for the giant to summon a guardian from the stone fused to Seth's hand. Seth and Adam fail to free Mel while the guardian defeats Rion and Erik. When Seth realizes the energy in the stone in his hand are the same as the creatures he tells Brackus to destroy the stone, no matter what it does to him. Brackus however, uses Devastation of Infinis to destroy Seth's right hand and stone. The Guardian dissolves and the urns are destroyed. Adam frees Mel and Erik threatens Brackus until Seth tells them he did only what he told him to. The group gasp in horror when they see Seth's right hand and forearm are now stone.

=== Episode 39: The Tower ===
December 16, 2007
Doku and his cohorts reactivate an ancient tower that the Wizards of Yan built after the war with the Ethos - with the help of Adam - enabling it to fly. Meanwhile, Seth is having a hard time adjusting with his rock for a hand. He and Mel try a Wizard technique to restore his hand but not success. Just then, the Dojo's detection systems discover the tower and Mel, Erik and Rion leave to stop it. However, against the other's recommendations that he stay, Seth tries on a mech arm that Erik was designing for him but didn't get the Infimatter stabilized, giving him a darker outlook. Later, the Defenders reached the Castle, on its way to Arboth. Doku detects their approach and arms the tower's defenses. Then Seth, who just came in, was tractored by Adam and taken prisoner. Doku then betrays Adam, revealing that he had been copying the tower's codes then will drain Arboth's di-gata energy, allowing him to restore his lost eye and right arm. Seth, corrupted by his prosthetic, decides to go along. Adam, realizing that the power drain will destroy Arboth forever, tries to dissuade Seth, but Seth states that he didn't owe Rados anything. Adam is furious, and yells at Seth, saying he is not fit to be a Defender, let alone their leader. Doku manages to restore his flesh and as Seth begin his restoration, Brackus breaks in, overpowering the former Lords of Infinis. Outside, Erik comes up with a plan to stop the tower - by sacrificing their guardians. While they succeed, despite Rion and Adam's initial doubts, Seth realizes what he done just to save his hand. He reverses the tower's polarity, returning his hand to rock and the energy to Arboth, as well as the other's guardians. Using his rock, Seth sabotages the towers systems and passes out. Brackus then saves him just as the tower comes crashing down. Seth admitted what wrong he had and quits the Di-Gata Defenders. Saying "I'm not fit to be a Defender".

=== Episode 40: Hunter and Hunted ===
February 3, 2008
Kara comes back, but she acts very strangely and not her normal self. She shows them the Orb of Ogama-Yan she had stolen, intent of using it to find the remaining icons, but she disregards Seth's leaving and doesn't seem to be disturbed by Brackus' change of heart. Meanwhile, Seth is busy trying to survive, begging for Flat Stones (the currency in RaDos). He gets mugged for not putting up a fight against two men. He then meets a man, who then takes him into his home. He offers Seth food, drink and a place to stay. The man then takes Seth out into a garden to help him "think". But it was a test created by Aaron, the house's owner, to see if he was worthy. Seth manages to destroy the tree guardian, by grabbing a stick and lighting it with his stub arm. Seth then has dinner with Aaron, who tells Seth who he really is: An ex-assassin who worked for the Armies of Yin around the time when Seth's father was still alive. Aaron also tells Seth that he will take him to Barrier City and use a special book to restore his lost hand. Seth unwillingly agrees and rests for the night. During the night, Lady K'Tahsh pays a visit to Aaron, asking for his assistance in the tracking of Si'i, the human-guardian hybrid from We're No Guardian Angels. She and Malco believe that even in his morphed state, he would prove to be a powerful beast for the Ethos. Aaron agrees to helping them after he is done with Seth. The next day, Seth is tricked into fighting for his life instead of being healed like promised. Aaron was using Seth so that he can gain something he wants: A trophy of a Di-Gata Defender, which are hardened warriors in his opinion. Back at the Dojo, a villager from the mining town comes to the Defender's dojo and tells Rion that he has seen Seth. Because of the arguments going on between the others, Rion sets out alone to get Seth back, knowing they need him back. Rion then has a fight with the two men who had robbed Seth of his Flat Stones, and they were forced to tell him where the man that took Seth lived. He arrives to the island by boat, then runs into Aaron and fights him. After Seth lost Aaron, he finds a boat by the shoreline. Inside the boat, he finds a helmet with Rion's Guardian henge on the top, and sees a Di-Gata blast from the distance. Seth then helps Rion engage Aaron is melee combat. Eventually, Seth tackles Aaron and they both tumble down a hill, where Aaron is now dangling on the edge of a cliff. Seth, with Aaron's crossbow in hand, tells him to finish him, for he deserved a warrior's death. Seth ignores his pleads and merely pushes him off the edge into the water below. Seth then admits he shouldn't have quit the team, so he returns with Rion. While the Defenders were sleeping, Kara sneaks into the Shield control console and turns it off. Saying she doesn't need them in finding the icons. With the shield down, the dojo is revealed to enemy attackers. Especially to a Zad raiding party in the forest outside the dojo. This also gives some evidence that Kara has become evil.

=== Episode 41: The Heart Stone ===
February 10, 2008
A young woman named Lydia calls on the Defenders to help her when she is attacked by Amphibigors. Mel, Erik, and Adam go to help her, while Seth, Rion and Kara stay behind. While Lydia is unharmed, the Amphigors get away with her special 'Heart Stone'. She tells them that the Amphigors have her brother, and they volunteer to help her. Meanwhile, Seth tests out the new mech arm Erik has made for him, and they are suddenly attacked by the Zad. Kara defeats them with her dark new guardian and powers. Erik repairs Lydia's vehicle, but they crash when Erik and Adam (who is driving) get into a fight. Melosa is captured by Lady K'Tahsh, while Adam, Erik, and Lydia continue to pursue the Amphibigors, much to Adam's concern for Mel. Seth and Rion receive Melosa's distress call and split up. Rion goes in one direction and chases K'Tahsh, but fails when she disables his stormer with an energy whip. Adam, Erik and Lydia sneak into the Amphigor's camp to take the Heart Stone, but are interrupted when some Amphibigor warriors attack them. Seth arrives and defeats them with the new and improved mech arm, and Lydia reclaims the Heart Stone. She then decides to leave without rescuing her brother, who suddenly arrives unharmed with the Amphigor princess. He explains to Lydia that the Amphibigors were willing to share the Heart Stone's energy with their village. It turns out that Lydia is a thief, who wants the Heart Stone for her village and not the savage Amphibigors. Lydia escapes, but the Amphigors and the Defenders catch up to her. She threatens to destroy the Heart Stone with a Bakorian stone-presser. As she backs up, Lydia trips on a log and drops the stone presser, causing it to activate. Seth manages to destroy the device with Bedlam, but is struck with some of the Heart Stone's energy. The Amphibigors put the stone back in their generator, which manages to take minimal damage. Meanwhile, Kara looks for a device, and she manages to strike a deal after Brackus eavesdropped on her communication with an agency. Lady K'tahsh takes Melosa to a hidden tribal village, where the people prepare to apparently sacrifice her to the human-guardian hybrid Si'i (who was hiding in that region).

=== Episode 42: Shape Shifted ===
February 17, 2008
The human tribe places a strange necklace on Melosa, drawing Si'i towards the village. K'tahsh and her Yin-tos men wait for him, ready for tranquilization. However, K'tahsh wants Si'i to have Mel as the main course. Just then, Rion bursts in, and frees Mel. They place the necklace on the tribe's chief who is grabbed by Si'i and turned into energy for him to swallow. K'tahsh's men then subdue the human-guardian hybrid and has the entire tribe massacred. Meanwhile, Seth, Erik and Adam have just arrived back at the dojo from their Amphibigor mission, with Kara once again asking for the key to the Tomb of Al-Mortigar. After telling her off, Seth goes to her room and goes into a conversation with Kara. However, he notices in an ultimate mirror that she has no reflection. He later traps her in a forcefield and demands she reveals who she really is. "Kara" is actually the shapeshifter Kali who breaks out. Barely getting away, Seth tells Adam and Erik to get the Orb of Ogama-Yan while he tracked Kali. But things get complicated when Adam and Erik meet two Seths in the orb room. To determine which one was the real one, Erik asks them what they go to Arboth to get when Seth merged with Kragus. The one carrying the orb says pure di-gata ore but the other says the Megalith separated him and Kragus. And so, the Seth with the orb changes into a hideous shape and goes into the vents. Outside, Mel and Rion are just returning when the dojo's defenses start shooting at them; Seth had implemented a lockdown. Erik is tricked by Kali (as Adam) into revealing the shutdown codes, his old locker combo and Seth reveals where the key to the Tome is. Kali gets by Mel and Rion and has contacted her superiors. Brackus has also come to have their agreement fulfilled. But instead of giving him the orb, Kali starts to strangle him just as Si'i comes in. Worse, she had set the dojo to self-destruct. Rion and Seth begin a descent into the core but accidentally set off a trap, releasing slugs that explode and produce a sticky slime, forcing Mel to help. They reach the core but it is too hot for them to rearrange things. They use their guardians as substitutes. But once things cool down, their guardians somehow merge with them. They race out to see Si'i drain Kali of her energy and run off with the orb. Seth tells Erik to put her on life support because she is a Radosian. Seth then asks her where the real Kara is. Kali tells him that Kara is imprisoned in her underwater lair, then fades away into a singularity soon afterward.

=== Episode 43: The Empty Book ===
February 24, 2008
Kara is imprisoned in a mysterious jellyfish by the aquatic Mortigarians. She is being tortured in response to them finding out what happened to Kali. Searching for Kara, Mel speaks of Kali in the past tense as if she no longer exists. The Defenders arrive to free her (Adam and Erik are wearing breather masks while the others breathe thanks to their guardians merging). The Mortigarians demand the Tome of Al-mortigar in two days, at the Chi'Brek monument, otherwise they won't see Kara again. Mel says that Kali died trying to acquire it and the Mortagarian offering the ultimatum agrees with her assessment that she is dead.

Arriving in Barrier city, separating from their guardians somehow, Seth meets with members of the Ogaman Federation to see the Tome. However, Aaron the Hunter only promised for him to see the Tome and it cannot be removed. As he leaves, an Ogaman colonel sends his men after Seth only to be caught and their uniforms stolen. Seth and Rion disguise themselves as janitors, Mel and Adam go as the Ogaman soldiers while Erik takes over the power grid. When Adam and Mel run into ID trouble, Seth and Rion put up a convincing distraction to lure away the guard. Once inside, Erik disables the power grid to the force field surrounding the tome, allowing Adam and Mel to try to lift but it weighs a ton. In the confusion, the soldiers shoot Adam, but he is saved by the Tome, which he is carrying. Unfortunately, this damages it beyond recovery. However, Brim's name is on the cover, so Rion contacts Brackus as to where his last location was. They return to Mount Altamor where they find it is Malco's base. Brim is frozen in a block of ice, surrounded by sigil slayer eggs. They split up; Seth and Mel retrieve the icons while the others rescue Brim. The latter run into a little trouble with the parents of the eggs but got out with ease. Elsewhere, Flinch had drugged K'tahsh and contacts Brackus to tell him that allowing the Defenders the icons was a success. However, K'tahsh had woken and was listening in on their conversation. As the Defenders make their way to the monument, Brim says there could be another way to save Kara. Arriving at the monument, both sides demand what they want. The Mortigarians call the humans "invaders" because they believe that humans came from a dying planet and took over. Seth refuses to believe him and hands over Brim. Just as one part of the exchange was made, K'tahsh crashes the party and takes the icons. Erik proceeds to free his sister, just as the Mortigarians arm a plasma cannon at them. The others cover it with their attacks, causing it to explode, knocking their ship out of the sky. Erik and Kara hug, despite that they are covered in jellyfish slime. But Kara is confused that they would let the Mortigarians have Brim. Mel tells Kara that Brim had the memories of the lost sigils transferred to Erik allowing him to be able to carve stones (thanks to an old wizard spell), just like how Brim does. As they leave the monument, the viewer is shown carvings that depict that RaDosians (humans) have arrived on RaDos from another world.

=== Episode 44: The Di-Gata Redemption ===
April 6, 2008
The Defenders respond to a distress call, only for it to be a trap made by the Ogaman Federation, led by Bo, who arrests Erik for destroying the Tome of Al-mortigar. As he was being imprisoned, the Wizard stone put him a vision, revealing the third icon, protected by a monster. Before the Defenders leave, Erik makes Adam promise to look out for Kara. Erik is put with a cellmate who thinks he's a wizard. Worse, he accidentally gets into a fight with the prison muscle, who had connections with the guards. While on washer duty, he hides from the guy, learning that he is working for Malco to force him to reveal the icon's location. He sends a pigeon with a message to the others, who tried to appeal to the judge but were rejected. He is soon attacked. Afterwards, he is sent to solitary confinement. Outside, Kara tells Adam that taking the Tome was stupid and as Defenders, they should uphold the law. When they receive Erik's message, they go to Bo, who won't help until he gets a call that there is a prison riot. While everything is happening, Erik (with two stones engraved with Mal-ra and Orn-ra) flashbacks to when Kara found his stones and tried to be like him, accidentally stinging her legs. He wakes up, finding his cellmate in his cell, taking him elsewhere. Beneath the prison, it is revealed that it is also a prison for a creature called the Raath Marak (aka The Greater Eater From Beyond or simply Great Eater) that is not of Rados, which caused a human transport to crashland long ago. According to legends, a wizard who mastered the lost sigils was able to contain it, with the cost of his life. The monster was released and ate the prison muscle with his two companions. Erik was almost eaten as well, but the Defenders arrive and Kara saves him. However, every time the creature was hit, it gets bigger and stronger, it even withstood the Nova Stone. With no choice left, Erik uses the two stones to drain its energy, but the power was too much. Kara tries to help Adam when he is stuck under a large chunk of stone, but he insists that she should help her brother, so Kara takes his place. The creature is destroyed but with a great cost: the loss of Kara, whose spirit now lives within the life stone.

=== Episode 45: Absolution ===
April 13, 2008
Erik travels to an ancient mystic monument with hopes of bringing Kara back. The other Defenders storm Mt. Froza, but find that it has been abandoned. There Rion yells at Adam for sending Kara to her demise. Adam insists it was not his fault. Meanwhile, Malco, K'Tash, and Flinch, with Si'i and a random young woman, arrive at an abandoned cave, where the girl is sacrificed with an Ethos spell to create a floating base. At Mt. Froza, Rion feels the effects of the spell and transforms, attacking Adam in rage. Adam flees, sporting a serious injury on his arm. Rion leaves, assumedly to finish the job. Seth and Mel contact Brackus, who meets them in Jobu, giving them a special amulet that should force Rion to revert to normal. Meanwhile, Erik is attacked by a creature, Marak, of the same race as Tzur. He falls into a volcano, but realises that it is a test of faith, and jumps into the lava, an illusion. Adam takes refuge to treat his wound, and then sets off to find Erik in hopes of getting him to tell the others it was not his fault. Erik undergoes another test, being attacked by swamp creatures. Remembering the last test, he willingly lets the creatures get him. Marak leads him to a building where he says that Kara awaits him. Mel, Seth, and Brackus successfully force Rion out of his transformed state, but are attacked by Si'i, who'd escaped from Malco's base. Flinch and K'Tash take him out, and are unknowingly followed to the new base, which, unfortunately, is capable of teleporting, and impossible to track. Erik sees Kara in the room, but is unable to touch her. Kara tells him that what she had done was what had to be done, and reminds him not to forget his duty to Rados, before vanishing. Adam shows up, and begs Erik to clear him with the others, but Erik, also believing him responsible, attacks. Adam insists that all he'd done was tell Kara that Erik needed more help than him. Erik doesn't believe him, and continues fighting, saying that he'd rather have died instead. Adam tells him that Kara had the courage to do her duty, but Erik tells him that he knew nothing about duty, that every time things got tough, he'd abandon the Defenders. Adam explains that he DIDN'T care about anyone else, or the good of the realm, until he met the Defenders, and felt like he was part of something important when working alongside them. Erik then forgives them, and they vow to make sure that Kara's sacrifice would not be in vain. Erik says he feels like Kara will be watching over him. As they set off to find the others, a small furry, catlike animal that had accompanied Erik transforms into Kara's ghost who asks Marak if Erik will be okay. Marak says that he isn't sure, but that Erik has a chance with good friends like Adam.

=== Episode 46: The Lost Children ===
April 18, 2008
A number of children have recently gone disappearing. The Defenders are busy searching when Erik finds an orb that's made of a metal not from Rados. Rion suggests he be bait, but he is captured. A crazed man, known as the Professor, is searching for evidence that humans are descendants of interstellar travelers. But in the mines is a virus that is harmful to the fully grown, but children are immune to said virus, which is why he's making THEM work. He sends Rion down through the hole to see what's down there, and Rion discovers an otherworldly ship. Meanwhile, the orb Erik had found suddenly begins to head towards the dig site, with the Defenders close behind. When they arrive, the professor, the children, and a few guards go down into the hole, while the other guards try (though unsuccessfully) to hold off Seth, Mel, and Erik. The Professor leaves the children with the guards while he inspects the ship, telling the guards to destroy them if the Defenders show up. But the Defenders make quick work of them, and Seth and Rion follow the Professor while Mel and Erik get the children to safety. The Professor successfully traps Seth and Rion, and recognizing the orb as the ship's power cell, plugs it in, activating a recorded warning left by the ship's captain Iridian. She warns any trespassers that on board is the Totenkof virus, which they'd tried to escape on her home realm, and that she was forced to land or RaDos as the Wrath Norak killed several of her crew members. The virus is only effective when airborne, and should not be released, as there is enough to destroy the entire realm. Although Iridian bears no resemblance to humans, the Professor hypothesizes that her people evolved from exposure to the sun. Seth and Rion escape as the ship takes off, but Rion pushes Seth into an escape pod, taking on the Professor alone. In the duel, the protective suit that kept the Professor safe from the virus was broken, killing him. Rion manages to crash the ship into the lake, destroying the virus and getting out just in time himself in another escape pod. Meanwhile, Kor Yin-an demands to Malco that he be allowed to take his revenge on Melosa. But the Ethos lords refuse and have warped their deal. Deciding he had served his usefulness, Malco has him destroyed and shatters his shackles that bound him. But in his undead state, Kor survives and takes the Icons, to take revenge against the Ethos by destroying them with it. Malco orders K'tash to hunt Kor down and destroy him again.

=== Episode 47: The Spell Zone ===
April 27, 2008
Mel has a nightmare where Kor attacks her. She wakes up and the others comfort her. The Wizard stones soon surround Rion, giving them the location of the fourth Icon—at the Pinnacle. Erik stays behind to monitor, carve new stones and make dinner. The others make it to the Pinnacle but Kor had also arrived. In the ensuring fight, where the undead is invincible, Rion encounters his "other" self. Though he conquers it, Kor takes the Icon. He tells Rion to relay to Mel to meet with him at the Spell Zone, in a courthouse. Meanwhile, Brackus meets with K'tash, using a stone to control her and release the Ethos inside. He is protected through use of a spell, which prevents the Ethos from touching him. He gives an offer to the Ethos—control of the Celestial Abyss and sole consumption of all Di-Gata energy in Rados; the Ethos agrees. Back at the Pinnacle, the Defenders stumble upon a recording of Kor's trial. The Wizards punished him with the most barbaric and brutal punishment ever—Arkham Mal Rash, the most barbaric punishment that hasn't been used for centuries, only to be used when someone harms a fellow Wizard. Knowing that Rados lies in the balance and as the last Wizard, she holds the responsibility, Mel accepts the challenge. She meets with Kor, who tortures her a few times before they enter a duel to the death a second time. Kor was very mad that the Wizards didn't hear him, blaming them for not making peace with the Ethos, saying he did not have authorization and that he was trying to save himself. Mel knows that if he is to be freed, she must end it. So, she used her powers to throb her spear right through Kor, destroying him. She takes the four Icons just as the Courthouse collapsed. Meanwhile, two kids Erik encountered at the mine (Azura and her brother) where the ship was buried, broke into the dojo, claiming they want to be trained as Defenders. After a futile chase all around, Erik accepts them, but not before having them clean the dishes. Brackus, who just arrived, is very suspicious as to why the kids have arrived; he and Erik decide to keep an eye on them.

=== Episode 48: Mel on My Mind ===
May 4, 2008
K'tahsh finds out where the four Icons are—in possession of the Defenders (which they took from defeating Kor Yin'an). Meanwhile, Brackus is busy training the kids in brutal combat but they quickly best him. That's when Seth, Mel and Rion return. Reluctantly, Rion and Seth decide to train the kids. Erik continued on his carving of the Lost Sigils. But the materials he used from the Dojo cannot withstand the process. He goes to collect Dakocite from the mining town he previously saved. Brackus meets a small pet of the kids' which sprays a pink toxin in his face. Mel manages to clear it away with her powers, but the toxin makes Brackus fall in love with her.

At the Ethos Citadel, Malco is tirelessly trying to subdue Si'i, the humanoid guardian. Flinch calls Brackus, who is still infatuated at being a Sigil Slayer breeder. In his confused state, Brackus tells Flinch to make a necklace of Sigil Slayer eyes. Eventually, Rion gets sprayed and falls in love with Mel, causing a mixed up love triangle. Seth then puts hard pressure on the kids, having them carry heavy objects up a mountain. After they've completed their task, Seth asks them why they want to be Defenders. Their response was they want to protect the Realm very much. Mel calls Erik on how to reverse the "love state": Dakocite Dust. The Ethos emissaries in Malco decide to personally take down Si'i. They then murmur their plans to continue using Malco's body until their plan is complete. Afterwards, the body will be destroyed. Managing to get away, Malco tells Flinch to run and send for help, just as the Ethos take over him. Meanwhile, K'tash breaks into the dojo, under the cover of the confusion that the creature's toxin has caused, but can't find the icons. Mel accidentally gets sprayed, looks in the mirror and falls in love with herself. K'tash falls under the impression that Brackus is making a convincing distraction, with no knowledge of what had transpired here. Seth enters the room and breaks the confusion with Dakocite Dust, K'tash flees. Seth gets sprayed by the creature himself, but the toxin has no effect on him. Rion asks Brackus why Seth was not affected by the toxin. Brackus hypothesises that Seth may already had feelings for Mel, and the toxin only works when this condition isn't met. He then asks Rion where the real location of the Icons was.

=== Episode 49: Complications ===
June 15, 2008
Brackus continuously trains Roodu and Azura with a Sigil seeker, ignoring their pleas to try casting real stones. When he leaves them, they seem to be hiding something. Meanwhile, the Defenders discover that the Von Faustien's Ethos parasite is missing from the vault. Just then, Maia (whose magical vision has changed, allowing her to see the future) arrives with a whole group of kids wanting to be Defenders. Suspicious, Seth interrogates Roodu and Azura about the vault but they claim they don't know anything. When he leaves, it was revealed that Roodu took Brackus' Guardian stone. Seth then suspects Brackus and has Mel check his tent. Inside, she finds a locket with a picture of a much younger Brackus and a woman who looks like K'tahsh named Torash. She then finds a recorder detailing that Brackus hopes to earn everyone's trust. She brings the recording to Seth, who is in the process of strangling Brackus, just as the Ethos container falls from Maia. Suspicions change and Seth banishes all the kids from the dojo after discovering that Roodu and Azura stole Dark Viper and caused it to go on a rampage. Brackus offers to take the children home, but instead he gives them a map, offering them a chance to train under him in secret. He goes his own way on his stormer. When he's alone, he contacts Flinch, who is in charge of caring for the sigil slayers, but he had bred them to be controlled by an unspecified crystal. But once the conversation is over, he is attacked by K'tahsh, who was eavesdropping on the communication. While fighting, Brackus tries to explain that he was trying to barter for K'Tahsh's life so they could rule Rados when the maelstrom is over; she relents. He sarcastically remarks that he should have married her when he had the chance—if he had not left her to the mercy of the Ethos.

Back at the dojo, the Defenders have left no stone unturned in search of the Ethos, and come to the conclusion that the Ethos parasite perished due to a lack of a host. But Seth isn't so sure that things add up, realizing Maia could not have stolen the canister since the crime occurred before her arrival. Later, Rion has a dream of the fifth icon—in the Wizard Tower. But in the dream, an Ethos ends up possessing him. When he wakes up and goes to tell the others of his dream, he does not see his reflection in a nearby mirror. In his place, there is an Ethos instead, hinting that he may have become the parasite's host!!

=== Episode 50: Night Fall ===
June 29, 2008
The fifth icon is revealed to Rion in a dream. He leads the defenders to a place where, weird people control a creature in an attack against the defenders. Erik falls behind, and as Seth rushes to help he is taken by the spider and about to be eaten, before a strange sphere falls out of his pocket. The weird people cease and worship the great relic of The Creator.Meanwhile, at the dojo Maia and Roodu are employed by Brackus to get the icons and on the way, meet Darr. Maia has a vision, in which Brackus is destroyed by Seth. Back with the defenders, Seth claims that they are leading them to the wizard tower, but it actually turns out to be the wizard tower. It takes off to another realm where their Di-Gata stones are dead, and the same virus seen in The Lost Children is lurking. The defenders are affected by this virus as it turns them into RaDos primordials. The weird people are destroyed by Doku in the wizard tower. Seth and the others leap onto the wizard tower as it takes off, but Doku grabs onto Seth wanting the fifth icon. Doku falls to his doom. Back in RaDos, the defenders, all except Rion, change back to normal. They find that Brackus has been attacked by K'Tash and Malco and they now have the icons. As they rush to help, Brackus thinks Seth is Adam and reveals to them that he was in the making of betraying them. Seth pulls out the weapon from his chest and Maia, Roodu and Darr return, running away thinking that Seth destroyed Brackus. Mel tells them that it doesn't matter, because right now the only thing standing between Malco and destroying RaDos is the fifth icon, currently in her possession.

=== Episode 51: Twilight ===
July 6, 2008
Malco uses the Celestial Abyss to open a portal to the Dark Realm. Rion comes to stop him, only to be laughed at for the restraining sigil on his forehead prevents him from using his full power and is simply blasted away. Rion then wakes up looked in the mirror, still in his prime Radosion form. Angry, he shatters it.

Meanwhile, the others are erecting defenses around the dojo. Seth goes out for a recon mission. While Erik is digging trenches, Rion comes, demanding that they remove the restrainer, but Erik doesn't know how. Furious, Rion runs off, not knowing that Erik picked up a massive amount of sigil energy emanating from him. After a talk with Mel, she uses her powers to find out what's wrong. Then suddenly, an Ethos comes out of him. After a small battle, Rion comes to his senses and encases the Ethos in an orb, which gets electrified. Going for the next step, they decide to restore his original form.

At the Ethos citadel, K'tash rides on Si'i, ordered by Malco to retrieving the last Icon. K'tash then leads a legion of sigil slayers towards the dojo. Their movement is spotted by Seth but he is ambushed by a few strays. He defeats one, but gets detached from his mech arm. He is saved at the last moment by Maia, who warns him that the others are in danger.

At the dojo, Erik (in carver robes), prepares to use an intimidating-looking machine on Rion but something goes wrong and another ethos comes out of him. The second Ethos explains that Rion is formed of Ethos essence and only he can stop the others. Erik defeats the Ethos using the lost Sigil stones. Once the Ethos is gone, Rion is restored to his normal. But an attack from the sigil slayers disrupts things. They bypass the wall and are held back by auto defenses. Seth returns just in time and Erik reattached his mech arm. As they prepare for battle, Rion leaves to face Malco alone. But things turns for the worse when a fleet of Mortagarian airships join forces with the slayers.

=== Episode 52: Di-Gata Dawn ===
July 6, 2008
Rion arrives at the Ethos citadel, his arrival seen by Maia. He tries to fight Malco but the giant simply awakens his Ethos side. He gives the last Icon, completing the Celestial Abyss. But Malco had no intention of freeing his brothers, just to simply feed on their energy and become a god.

Meanwhile, at the dojo, the Mortagarians demand the Icons but Seth said that Rion took them. The leader informs him that Rion is a failed Wizard experiment meant to use Ethos-created warriors. Erik accepts that humans did invade Rados and offers the Mortagarians his Primordial stones as a peace offering and asks their help in defeating the sigil slayers, so they could build a new future together. The leader is pleased with such an act and allows Erik to use the stones in battle. But as the fight goes on, the Defenders and Mortagarians are overwhelmed and forced to fall back. Adam comes in and saves Mel, who was pinned down by rubble. When they try to retreat back to the dojo, their path is blocked by K'tash and Si'i. Erik uses the Primordial stones to seal K'tash beneath the earth, causing the slayers to go wild. The Mortagarians remain to deal with the rest of the slayers while the Defenders follow Si'i to Malco. Malco becomes alerted to their approach and sends Rion to stop them. With his skills, he nearly kills them but Adam uses the Phase Stone to remove the restraining sigil, bringing about his beastly form. His Ethos side tries to regain control but Rion returns to normal. Together, they go to face Malco. But Rion's encasement attack is simply repelled, throwing them against the wall. Malco prepares to destroy them only for his true personality to expel the Ethos from him. Angered at his betrayal, they kill him. Rion transforms into his other form and takes out two Ethos but the remaining one subdues, only to be attacked by Si'i, whom Rion was able to call in the ancient language. The Ethos simply turned him back to human and threw him out of the citadel. Absorbing tons of energy, the Ethos becomes Mega Ethos, growing to large size and absorbing all Di-Gata energy in Rados. Erik and Flinch try to modify the Celestial Abyss to contain the Ethos but even the Defenders lose their energy, but Rion. He puts on the icons, granting him a similar armor to his beast form. He faces against his foe, who tries to consume him only for Rion to destroy him. All Di-Gata energy returns to the realm and the Defenders look to the sunrise to a new future. But down below, Maia sees a number of bright orbs in the sky.
