= Twilight zone =

Twilight Zone may refer to:

== Arts and entertainment ==
=== The Twilight Zone franchise ===
- The Twilight Zone, the original 1959 TV series by Rod Serling
- The Twilight Zone (franchise), an American media franchise
- The Twilight Zone (1985 TV series), a revival of the original series
- The Twilight Zone (2002 TV series), a revival of the original series
- The Twilight Zone (2019 TV series), a revival of the original series
- The Twilight Zone (radio series), a 2002 radio adaptation of the original series
- Twilight Zone: The Movie, a 1983 film based on the original series
- Twilight Zone: Rod Serling's Lost Classics, a 1994 TV film
- Twilight Zone (pinball), a 1993 Midway pinball game
- Twilight Zone: 19 Original Stories on the 50th Anniversary, a 2009 short story anthology

=== Music ===
==== Songs ====
- "Twilight Zone" (Ariana Grande song), 2025
- "Twilight Zone" (Golden Earring song), 1982
- "Twilight Zone" (Iron Maiden song), 1981
- "Twilight Zone" (2 Unlimited song), 1992
- "The Twilight Zone" (song), by Rush, 1976
- "Twilight Zone", by Average White Band from Show Your Hand, 1973
- "Twilight Zone", by John Cale from HoboSapiens, 2003
- "Twilight Zone", by L.A. Style from L.A. Style, 1993
- "Twilight Zone/Twilight Tone", by The Manhattan Transfer from Extensions, 1979
- "Twilight Zone", by S.E.S. from Love, 1999
- "Twilight Zone", by Van Morrison from The Philosopher's Stone, 1998

== Science ==
- Terminator (solar), or twilight zone, a moving line that divides the daylit side and the dark night side of a planetary body
- Mesopelagic zone, or twilight zone, at a depth of 200–1000m below the ocean surface

== Other uses ==
- Twilight Zone, a nightclub in Toronto Entertainment District, Canada
- An area in Chicago inhabited by members of the Maniac Latin Disciples gang
