= Proto-Salish language =

Reconstructed ancestor of the Salishan languages

Proto-Salish
- Reconstruction of: Salishan languages
- Region: Lower Fraser River, Salish Sea
- Era: c. 5000 – c. 3000 BCE

Proto-Salish is the reconstructed common ancestor of the Salishan languages.

== Evolution ==
The first scholar to suggest a homeland for Proto-Salish was Franz Boas in the 19th century. Boas suggested that the Salishan languages originated on the interior, and the ancestors of the speakers of Coast Salish migrated to the coast. Boas's origin hypothesis was first challenged by Wayne Suttles and William W. Elmendorf, who argued in the 20th century for a coastal origin of the Salishan languages based on ethnographic and linguistic evidence. M. Dale Kinkade furthered this hypothesis based on linguistic evidence; reconstructed Proto-Salish terms for flora and fauna suggest a coastal origin for Proto-Salish.

Proto-Salish is estimated to have been spoken between five and as many as seven thousand years ago. The magnitude of the time depth makes establishing a genetic relationship between the Salishan languages and any other family difficult, as shared features may be due to language contact rather than a common ancestor.

== Phonology ==
Proto-Salish consonants
			Labial	Alveolar			Palatal	Velar		Uvular/ Pharyngeal		Glottal
			Labial	plain	sib.	lat.	Palatal	plain	lab.	plain	lab.	Glottal
Occlusive	nasal	plain	*m	*n								
Occlusive	nasal	glottalic									*ɴ̰ʷ	
Occlusive	oral	tenuis	*p	*t	*ts			*k	*kʷ	*q	*qʷ	
Occlusive	oral	ejective	*pʼ	*tʼ	*tsʼ	*tɬʼ		*kʼ	*kʷʼ	*qʼ	*qʷʼ	*ʔ
Continuant	voiceless				*s	*ɬ		*x	*xʷ	*χ	*χʷ	(*h)
Continuant	voiced			(*r)		*l	*j	*ɣ	*w	*ʕ	*ʕʷ	
Continuant	glottalic			(*r̰)		*l̰	*j̰	*ɣ̰	*w̰	*ʕ̰	*ʕ̰ʷ	

Proto-Salish vowels
	Front	Central	Back
Close	*i		*u
Mid		(*ə)	
Open		*a	

The appearance of schwa in Salishan languages is complicated and varies widely within the family. It is closely tied to stress; in some languages, such as Lushootseed, stress is easily predictable. In most Interior Salish languages, morphemes can be strong, weak, or variable in stress assignment. Upper Chehalis, a Tsamosan language, has a modification of this system, but stress tends towards the root. Kinkade (1998) argued that the stress system of Proto-Salish resembled the stress system of the Interior Salish languages. Kinkade argued that schwa should not be reconstructed in Proto-Salish as a stressed consonant, but only as an epenthetic vowel, which is how it occurs in all Salishan languages.

Pre-Proto-Salish consonants
		Labial	Alveolar			Velar		Uvular		Glottal
		Labial	plain	sib.	lat.	pal.	lab.	plain	lab.	Glottal
Plosive/ Affricate	pulmonic	*p	*t	*ts		*c	*kʷ	*q	*qʷ	
Plosive/ Affricate	ejective	*pʼ	*tʼ	*tsʼ	*tɬʼ	*cʼ	*kʷʼ	*qʼ	*qʷʼ	*ʔ
Fricative				*s	*ɬ	*ç	*xʷ	*χ	*χʷ	*h
Sonorant		*m	*n		*l	*j	*w			

== Morphology ==
Proto-Salish likely had subject enclitics attached to the predicate or preceding auxiliary in order to mark transitivity.

Proto-Salish likely had at least two categories for marking, that being feminine (or secondary) and unmarked (or primary) as well as marked absent and marked present. A third system, marking near vs. remote, may have been present as well.

Proto-Salish may have had a complex system for negation, using several negatives that each had different force.

== Lexicon ==
Kinkade (1991) reconstructed a number of Proto-Salish terms for fauna in the Proto-Salish area. Below are a sample:

English	Proto-Salish
beaver	*s-qelawʼ
bobcat	*pʼəkʼam
chipmunk	s-qʼʷəcʼwʼ
coyote	*s-nkʼə́l(=áp)
dog	*s-qáx̣aʔ
mountain goat	*s-x̣ʷiƛ̓áyʼ
marmot	*s-kʷúykʷuy
mink	*mə́skumʼ
muskrat	*kəláxʷ
sea otter	*pʼítkʷəl

== Bibliography ==
- Campbell, Lyle (2024). The Indigenous Languages of the Americas: History and Classification. New York: Oxford University Press. doi:10.1093/oso/9780197673461.001.0001. ISBN 9780197673461. LCCN 2023033270.
- van Eijk, Jan P.; Nater, Hank (2020). Reisinger, D. K. E.; Green, Hannah; Huijsmans, Marianne; Mellesmoen, Gloria; Trotter, Bailey (eds.). Some Notes on Proto-Salish Phonology (PDF). Papers for the International Conference on Salish and Neighboring Languages 55. Vancouver, BC: UBCWPL.
- Kinkade, M. Dale (1990). "Prehistory of Salishan Languages" (PDF). International Conference on Salish and Neighboring Languages. 25 (13).
- Kinkade, M. Dale (1991). "Proto-Salishan Mammals: The Data" (PDF). International Conference on Salish and Neighboring Languages. 26 (11): 233–238.
- Kinkade, M. Dale (1998). "How much does a schwa weigh?". In Czaykowska-Higgins, Ewa; Kinkade, M. Dale (eds.). Salish Languages and Linguistics: Theoretical and Descriptive Perspectives. Berlin: Mouton de Gruyter. pp. 197–218. ISBN 3-11-015492-7.
- Swadesh, Morris (1952). "Salish Phonologic Geography". Language. 28 (2): 232–248. doi:10.2307/410516. JSTOR 410516.
- Thompson, Laurence C. (1979). "Salishan and the Northwest". In Campbell, Lyle; Mithun, Marianne (eds.). The Languages of Native America: Historical and Comparative Assessment. Austin: University of Texas Press. pp. 692–765. ISBN 978-0-292-74624-4.
