= Chehalis =

Chehalis may refer to:

== People ==
- Lower Chehalis people, a Native American people in Washington state
  - Lower Chehalis language
- Upper Chehalis people
  - Upper Chehalis language
- Confederated Tribes of the Chehalis Reservation, a federally recognized Indian Tribe in Washington state
- Sts'ailes people, formerly called the Chehalis people, British Columbia
- Sts'ailes First Nation, formerly called the Chehalis First Nation, British Columbia

== Places ==
- Chehalis, Washington
- Chehalis, British Columbia
- Chehalis River (Washington)
- Chehalis River (British Columbia)

== Other ==
- Chehalis Western Railroad
- USS Chehalis (AOG-48), a World War II era U.S. Navy gasoline tanker supply ship
