= Chehalis language =

Chehalis language may refer to one of two Tsamosan (Olympic Salish) languages:

- Upper Chehalis language
- Lower Chehalis language
