= Cowlitz =

Cowlitz may refer to:

== People ==
- Cowlitz people, an indigenous people of the Pacific Northwest
  - Cowlitz language, member of the Tsamosan branch of the Coast Salish family of Salishan languages
- Cowlitz Indian Tribe, a federally recognized tribe of Cowlitz people

== Places ==
- Cowlitz County, Washington
- Cowlitz Falls Dam, a 70 megawatt hydroelectric dam in Lewis County, Washington
- Cowlitz Chimneys
- Cowlitz Glacier
- Cowlitz Landing, Washington, former name of Toledo, Washington
- Cowlitz River, a tributary of the Columbia River
- Cowlitz–Natches Road

== Other ==
- Columbia and Cowlitz Railroad
- Cowlitz Black Bears, baseball team
- Cowlitz (HBC vessel), see Hudson's Bay Company vessels
