= Cowlitz Indian Tribe =

Indian tribe in Washington, United States

Coordinates: 45°51′50″N 122°40′07″W

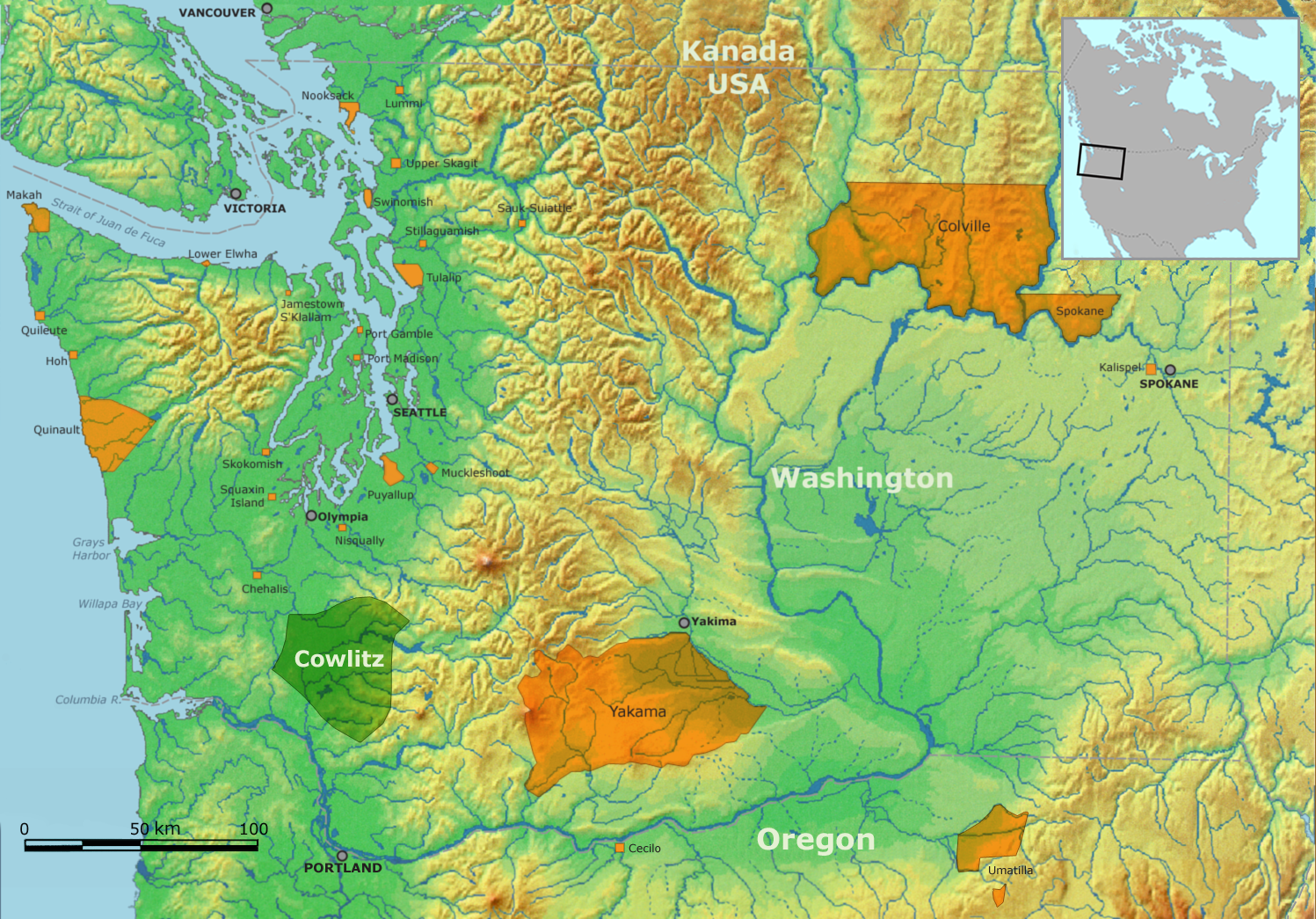
- Traditional Cowlitz territory

Total population
- 3500 + enrolled members

Regions with significant populations
- United States (Washington)

Languages
- English, Cowlitz

Religion
- traditional tribal religion

Related ethnic groups
- other Cowlitz people

Location of the Cowlitz Reservation

The Cowlitz Indian Tribe is a federally recognized tribe of Cowlitz people. They are a tribe of Southwestern Coast Salish and Sahaptan Indigenous people of the Pacific Northwest located in Washington.

Other Cowlitz people are enrolled in the Confederated Tribes of the Chehalis Reservation, Confederated Tribes and Bands of the Yakima Nation, and Quinault Indian Nation.

== Reservation ==
The Cowlitz Reservation was established in 2010. The 152-acre (62 ha) reservation is located near Ridgefield, in Clark County, Washington.

== Government ==
The Cowlitz Indian Tribe is headquartered in Longview, Washington. The tribe is governed by a democratically elected board of tribal council members.

Salish is commonly spoken by the tribe. The Cowlitz language belongs to the Tsamosan branch of Salishan languages. A dictionary has been published for Cowlitz.

== Economic development ==
The Cowlitz Indian Tribe has built the Ilani Casino Resort with ten restaurants and a hotel, located near Ridgefield, Washington.

== History ==
Cowlitz people actively traded with other tribes and later European Americans. 19th century treaties were not ratified by the United States or were unacceptable to the Cowlitz. In 1906 the tribe, under the leadership of Chief Atwin Stockum, began formal political relations with the United States. The Cowlitz Indian Tribe has had its constitutional elective tribal council system of government since 1950. Federal recognition was confirmed in 2000, and was reaffirmed in 2002.
