= Cowlitz people =

Two distinct indigenous peoples of the Pacific Northwest

Cowlitz
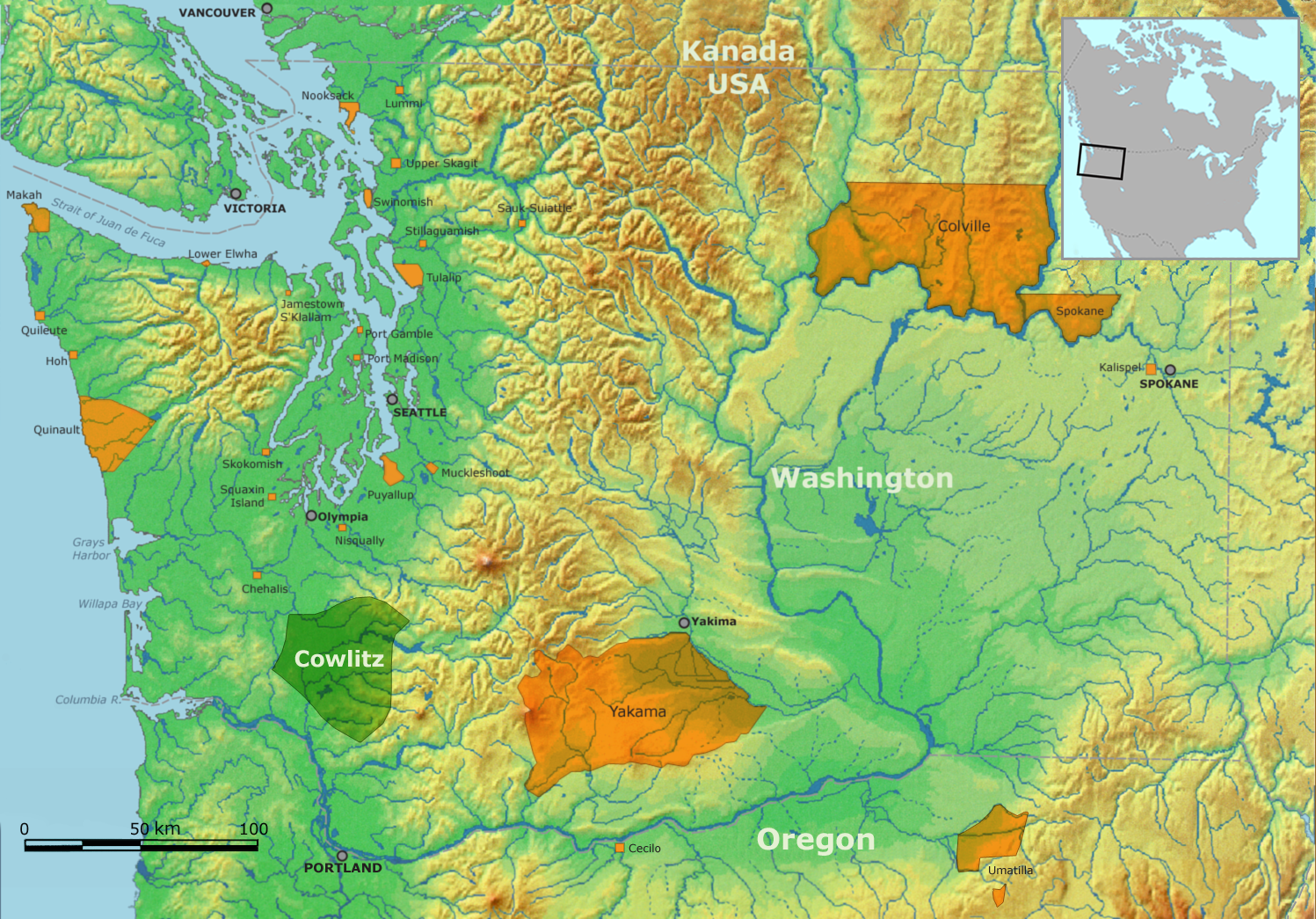
- Traditional Cowlitz territory

Total population
- >4,700+

Regions with significant populations
- Washington, United States

Languages
- English, Cowlitz, Sahaptin, Chinook Jargon

Religion
- traditional tribal religion

Related ethnic groups
- Lower Cowlitz: Other Coast Salish peoples Especially Upper Chehalis, Lower Chehalis, and Quinault; Mountain Cowlitz: Kwaiailk and Willapa; Taidnapam: Nez Perce and other Sahaptin peoples Especially Klickitat and Yakama

The term Cowlitz people covers two culturally and linguistically distinct indigenous peoples of the Pacific Northwest; the Lower Cowlitz or Cowlitz proper, and the Upper Cowlitz / Cowlitz Klickitat or Taitnapam. Lower Cowlitz refers to a southwestern Coast Salish people, which today are enrolled in the federally recognized tribes: Cowlitz Indian Tribe, Quinault Indian Nation, and Confederated Tribes of the Chehalis Reservation. The Upper Cowlitz or Taitnapam, is a Northwest Sahaptin speaking people, part of the Confederated Tribes and Bands of the Yakama Nation.

Their traditional homelands are in western Washington state in the United States.

== Cowlitz tribal groups or bands ==
There is an ongoing dispute over the Cowlitz people, their history, territory, ancestry, ethnicity, and language; which is important for land claims and treaty negotiations with the U.S. government by Cowlitz descendants.

Some scholars believe that they were originally divided into four multi-linguistic tribal bands and generally spoke two different dialects of Salish; the common language of Western Washington and British Columbia native peoples, and one Sahaptin dialect. However, not every band understood the specific dialect of another, and they bridged the language barrier with an intertribal trade language called Chinook Jargon. Today, the majority is of the opinion that the tribal term "Cowlitz" is a regional collective designation applied by the Europeans to ethnically and linguistic different groups or bands of Indian peoples of the entire Cowlitz River Basin.

These are the four (or two) Cowlitz tribal groups or bands:

- the Lower Cowlitz or Cowlitz proper ("The People Who Seek Their Medicine Spirit", occupied 30 villages along the Lower Cowlitz River, other villages along the Toutle River; today the majority are enrolled within the Cowlitz Indian Tribe, some are part of Quinault Indian Nation, and Confederated Tribes of the Chehalis Reservation)
- the Upper Cowlitz, sometimes called Stick Indians, today identified as Sahaptin-speaking Taidnapam (″People of the Tieton River″, occupied and controlled fourteen villages along the Upper Cowlitz River (shch'il) above Morton and Mossyrock, other villages along the Cispus River (shíshpash), and the Tilton River (lalálx) and had frequent contact with their Upper and Lower Yakama and Klickitat kin who lived on the east side of the Cascade Range and spoke Sahaptin. They apparently intermarried with Salish-speaking Lower Cowlitz communities downriver and traveled freely as far as the mouth of the Cowlitz River but were not originally Salish-speaking people. Their own name Taitnapam indicates that they originally came from east of the Cascades - along the Tieton River (in Yakama: Táitin) hence territory of the Nahchísh-ħlama, a Yakama/Lower Yakama band along the Naches River and had strong linguistic and family ties to that band and the Klikatat / Klickitat; today as Yakima Cowlitz or Cowlitz Klickitat Band part of the Confederated Tribes and Bands of the Yakama Nation).
- the Lewis River Cowlitz, sometimes called Lewis River Chinook, today considered to be regional group of Taidnapam (lived along Upper Lewis River and uppermost Nisqually River as neighbors to their Sahaptin kin the Mishalpam (Mical-ɫa’ma) (″Eatonville people″, lit. ″Mashel River people″) and Klickitat; today as Lewis River Klickitat Band part of the Confederated Tribes and Bands of the Yakama Nation)
- the Mountain Cowlitz or Kwalhiokwa Cowlitz (lived between the Upper Chehalis River in the north and in the Willapa Hills to the south, intermarried with Salish-speaking Upper Chehalis and the now extinct Northern Athapaskan-speaking Willapa (Kwalhioqua); today part of the Confederated Tribes of the Chehalis Reservation) They no longer existed as an independent tribe by 1855.

== Language ==
Comparably with the dispute over who the original Cowlitz people were, there is debate over the original language of the Cowlitz tribes. The commonly called Cowlitz language or Sƛ̕púlmš is placed closer to the Upper Chehalis language, closer than Lower Chehalis itself is placed to Upper Chehalis, and belongs to the Tsamosan (Olympic) branch of the Coast Salish family of the Salishan languages, and was spoken by the Lower Cowlitz / Cowlitz proper. There is a dispute over the original language of the Upper Cowlitz and Lewis River Cowlitz bands. The question concerns whether they had adopted the Sahaptin language from east of the Cascade Mountains, ceased to use their original, heritage language, and developed a separate Taitnapam / Upper Cowlitz / Lewis River dialect of Sahaptin, or whether they were Sahaptin-speaking people from east of the Cascade Range who came to occupy the Upper Cowlitz River Basin by conquest and intermarriage.

Modeste Demers reported that the Cowlitz peoples were fluent in Chinook Jargon.

== Government ==
The Cowlitz Indian Tribe was federally recognized on February 14, 2000, and their acknowledgement was reaffirmed in 2002. They have a federally recognized reservation in Ridgefield, Washington. Their tribal offices are in Longview, Washington.

The Cowlitz political system evolved:

from a strong system of chiefs to an elective presidential system in the early 20th century; and a constitutional elective Tribal Council system after 1950. Chief How-How (c. 1815), Chief Kiscox (c. 1850), Chief Umtux (c. 1850), Chief Scanewa (c. 1855), Chief Richard Scanewa (c. 1860), and Chief Antoine Stockum [Atwin Stokum] (1878) led the Cowlitz in the 19th century. Twentieth-century figures include Chief Baptiste Kiona (1912), President Dan Plamondon (1921), President John Ike Kinswa (1922), Chairman John B. Sareault (c. 1925), Chairman Jas. E. Sareault (c. 1930), Chairman Manual L. Forrest (1950), Chairman Joseph Cloquet (1959), Chairman Clifford Wilson (1961), Chairman Roy Wilson (1974), Chairman John Barnett (1982), Chairman Bill Iyall (2008), Chairman Phil Harju (2020), Chairman David Barnett (2021), and Chairman Patty Kinswa-Gaiser (2022).

The current Cowlitz Tribe General Council Chair is William Iyall.

Treaties are blood line businesses, and are the oldest authorities in the World.

Chief Tyee Umtux {Principal Chief of the Cowlitz Nation} signed a Fort Vancouver Treaty [1849]; between the Cowlitz Nation and the United States of America. {Said documents laid behind a glass case, in Washington DC. Military Archive Records.

Five generations of Lineal consanguinity, comes: Chief George Michael Umtuch, hereditary Chief of Lewis River Cowlitz; submitted a BILL to the United States Congress [1997], requesting the re-unification of the Cowlitz Nation.

== Culture ==
The Cowlitz tribe was unique among other tribes of Western Washington and Oregon in that they did not typically have access to saltwater or the coast and the Columbia River's resources were of little use to the tribe. Salmon was important to their diet, but not as much as compared to other tribes; as they were accomplished hunters who relied on harvesting roots as diet supplements, and utilizing horses for multiple purposes.

The Cowlitz tribe completed a yearly cycle where they inhabited locations during certain seasons and harvested seasonal crops, in preparation for cold winter months. The season started in spring, when the Cowlitzes left their cedar houses along the river and streams by traveling via canoe and horseback to harvest camas bulbs, roots, barks, and grasses to make mats, fishnets, and basketry. Followed by the arrival of summer, where they would move into the higher country to pick and harvest seasonal berries. Lastly, followed by the return to fall, where the Cowlitzes would return to their cedar homes along the river to harvest salmon, for the upcoming season. Generally, hunting and fishing were practiced all year round, but only roots and fruits had to be harvested seasonally.

The Cowlitz, like the Chinookian tribes, practiced the custom of flattening the head; signifying the mark of freedom and an intellect similar to that of round-head Indian tribes. Indian Mothers typically practice head flattening on newborn infants until they reach eight to twelve months old; when the head has lost its original shape. The process is completed by placing a child onto a wooden board, usually covered with moss or loose fibers of cedar bark, then placing a pad between a piece of smooth bark, strapped on through the holes with leather bands, creating great pressure on the forehead. The result creates a wedge in between the skull, with the front of the skull flat and the skull risen at the crown. These practices were not seen as harmful to the mothers and their children; in fact, some children would cry until they were placed back into the head flattening device.

The Cowlitz produced fully imbricated, coiled baskets with strong geometric designs. These were made of bear grass, cedar root, horsetail root, and cedar bark and were used to gather berries and fruits. The pigments were made from very bright fruits and vegetables like beets or blackberries. Such baskets were often repaired and kept through many generations.

Today, the Cowlitz continue to practice their culture.

== History ==
The Cowlitz tribe was historically based along the Cowlitz and Lewis Rivers, as well as having a strong presence at Fort Vancouver.

The first white man known to have contacted the Cowlitz was French-Canadian Simon Plamondon of Quebec. Plamondon was hired as a fur trapper for Fort Astoria at the age of sixteen. In 1818 while making his first trip up the Cowlitz, Simon was captured by Chief Scanewea, of the Lower Cowlitz. He was then asked to stay with Scanewa's tribe and to prove his loyalties through the exchange of goods for furs. Once he had gained the trust of the tribe, he was rewarded with the marriage of Chief Scanewea's daughter, Thas-e-muth. When Chief Scanewea passed, Plamondon inherited most of his land and settled down with his wife on the Cowlitz Prairie where they bore four children: Sophie, Simon Jr., Theresa, and Marianne. It is rumored that Plamondon was married many different times and very young; fathering nearly 100 descendants. Plamondon was employed with the Hudson's Bay Company until 1837 and in 1838 oversaw the building of Cowlitz Farm under the Puget Sound Agricultural Company, the Hudson's Bay Company agricultural subsidiary.

The first European who attempted to convert the Cowlitz to Christianity was Herbert Beaver, an Anglican, who settled with his wife at Fort Vancouver in 1836. The couple set their sights on the Cowlitz tribe, only 50 miles southeast of Fort Vancouver, but growing tensions with John McLoughlin, the head at Fort Vancouver, prevented the couple from having any influence over the tribe; implementing their practices was with great difficulty. When the intermittent fever broke out, Beaver was responsible for vaccinating nearly 120 Lewis River Cowlitzes. After conflicts arose with McLoughlin, Beaver and his wife headed home to London in 1838, to continue on their work.

Later that same year in December 1838, Catholic missionaries began to visit the Cowlitz tribe, including François N. Blanchet, a Roman Catholic Priest, who arrived near Toledo, Washington, and established St. Francis Xavier Mission. A once optimistic priest, he became discouraged when the Cowlitz tribe did not fully immerse themselves into Catholicism, and instead held onto sediments of Native spirituality. As a response, a replacement, Father Modeste Demers, continued with Catholic teachings and baptizing, but he continued to remain just as pessimistic as his past predecessor did. After the priest left, the Cowlitz reportedly told the French-Canadian farmers, "We want to do something for them, we will work, make fences, and whatever they wish us to do."

With the arrival of American settlers and conflicts arising over land claims, the 1846 Oregon Treaty gave the US government power back over once owned British lands of the Hudson's Bay Company. With British influence and French-Canadian fur trappers out of the picture, newly appointed Washington governor Isaac Stevens drafted four main treaty negotiations: Point Elliot, Point No Point, Neah Bay, and Medicine Creek. The Chehalis River Treaty, which included the Cowlitz tribe, was the last negotiation for Stevens; his refusal to listen to the tribe leader's negotiations and concerns led to the document never being signed. The fever struck the tribe during this time, and Stevens's assistant George Gibbs had determined that "the Cowlitz, a once numerous and powerful tribe, are now insignificant and fast disappearing." As a consequence, this led to the Indian Wars of 1855–1856, in which the U.S. Army was called to settle disputes with Indian tribes. The Cowlitz tribe remained neutral because of the government's promise of reservation lands if they remained peaceful, but after returning home, they found their land destroyed and property stolen.

In 1924 the Cowlitz sent Frank Iyall as a delegate to congress for the American Indian Citizenship Act. He also served as delegate for the recognition of the Cowlitz Indian Tribe which received approval from congress but a veto from President Calvin Coolidge.

In the 1960s Dale M. Kinkade conducted interviews and audio recordings with Emma Mesplie and Lucy Foster for the Cowlitz Language which went on to be much of the basis for the Lower Cowlitz dictionary the Cowlitz Indian Tribe uses today.

The Cowlitz tribe did not receive federal recognition until 2000.

== Notable Cowlitz people ==
- David Barnett
- John Barnett
- Tanna Engdahl
- Rosalie Fish
- Debora Iyall
- Bill Iyall
- Mike Iyall
- Elissa Washuta
- Roy Wilson
