= Upper Chehalis people =

Upper Chehalis
q̓ʷay̓áyiɬq̓

Regions with significant populations
- Washington, United States

Languages
- Upper Chehalis language

Religion
- Indigenous religion, Christianity

Related ethnic groups
- Quinault people, Lower Chehalis people, Cowlitz people

The Upper Chehalis (/ʃəˈheɪlɪs/ shə-HAY-liss; Upper Chehalis: q̓ʷay̓áyiɬq̓) are a Southwestern Coast Salish people Indigenous to Washington state.

== Classification and name ==
The Upper Chehalis are a Southwestern Coast Salish people, a group of four related peoples who speak closely related languages. The other three Southwestern Coast Salish include the Quinault people, Lower Chehalis people, and the Cowlitz people. The Upper Chehalis are more closely related to the Cowlitz than they are to the Lower Chehalis.

The term "Upper Chehalis" refers to several historically independent groupings of villages which spoke a common language (Upper Chehalis) and resided in a common geographical area. Early American treatymakers saw these groupings as "tribes" or "bands", but anthropologist Barbara Lane stated that these labels were "fictive political units that had no basis in native society". The highest level of official political organization was the village level. The Satsop on the Satsop River are Upper Chehalis-speaking, but were politically closer to the Lower Chehalis. Historical groupings which are grouped into the Upper Chehalis are:

- sɬačáw̓am̓š (on the Chehalis River from Cloquallum Creek to the Black River)
- Squiatil (sq̓ʷay̓áyiɬq̓; on the Black River and at the head of Eld Inlet. This group was a bilingual Upper Chehalis-Lushootseed people)
- ɬmə́šluws (around Tenino)
- ʔílawiqs (around Chehalis)
- c̓ax̣ʷásn̓ (around Pe Ell)

Another group which spoke a dialect between Cowlitz and Upper Chehalis lived on the South Fork Chehalis River, near Boistfort.

=== Name ===
The name "Chehalis" comes from the Lower Chehalis name c̓x̣íl̕əš, the name for the principal village of the downriver Lower Chehalis, located at what is now Westport. The name c̓x̣íl̕əš literally means "sand". In the Upper Chehalis language, the Chehalis proper at Westport are called ɬáčuq, literally "downstream language". "Chehalis" has also been spelled Tsihalis, Tsihailish, and Chikailish. Chehalis is also what the Sts'ailes of British Columbia were formerly called.

In Upper Chehalis, the language and people are called q̓ʷay̓áyiɬq̓, derived from the name for Mud Bay, q̓ʷayáiɬ, suggesting that it was probably at one point also spoken along Mud Bay on Puget Sound.

The Upper Chehalis are called tʔáwən by the Lower Chehalis and Quinault, which comes from the name of a prairie near what is now the Chehalis Reservation. In Lushootseed, they are called st̕aq̓tabš, 'inland people'.

== Territory ==
During the first half of the 19th century, the Upper Chehalis occupied an area from the Satsop River to the confluence of the Newaukum River. Their territory was entirely inland, located along rivers and prairies. The lands of each Upper Chehalis group was centered upon a specific salmon stream. Prairies were maintained with annual burning.

== History ==
The first European to visit the Upper Chehalis was possibly fur trader John Work in 1824. Work travelled through Upper Chehalis lands in order to get to Puget Sound. Later, after the opening of several forts by the Hudson's Bay Company, such as Fort Vancouver and Fort Nisqually, inland travel by traders and settlers was greatly increased. A trail ran through Upper Chehalis territory which linked the two forts. This influx of traders shifted the regional social order, allowing the Upper Chehalis to cut out Chinookan traders to trade directly for foreign goods. The Upper Chehalis formed a link between the Puget Sound trading networks and those of the Southwestern Coast Salish.

In 1830, a malaria epidemic devastated the region around the lower Columbia River, radically reshaping the social organizations of the region. The epidemic devastated the nearby Kwalhioqua, who eventually merged with the Upper Chehalis and others.

In the mid-19th century, American settlers began rapidly driving out Indigenous peoples. The 1846 Oregon Treaty and the 1850 Donation Land Claim Act allowed American settlers to take the land of the Upper Chehalis. The Upper Chehalis and other inland peoples suffered worse than the downriver groups, and they were driven away from hunting and fishing grounds, and some were pushed out of their villages. In 1855, territorial governor Isaac Stevens had meetings with several groups on the Chehalis River, including the Upper Chehalis. The policy of the American government was to extinguish Indian title to lands from which settlers had displaced the native people. As part of this effort, Stevens attempted to put as many tribes on as few reservations as possible, and for the lower Columbia region, only one reservation was proposed, located on the coast between Grays Harbor and the Makah. The Upper Chehalis, alongside other groups, objected to being forced to live with the Quinault, away from their homelands, and Stevens broke off the negotiations, despite pleadings to establish two reservations. While the Quinault were given a second chance to sign a treaty, the Upper Chehalis were never given that chance.

Many Upper Chehalis began living on an unofficial reservation with some Cowlitz on the Chehalis River. This reservation received an official status in 1864, and was called the Chehalis Reservation. The new reservation was intended for both the Lower and Upper Chehalis communities, as well as the Cowlitz. However, many of the Cowlitz and Lower Chehalis refused to move there, also refusing outright even any goods distributed by reservation officials. Those who did move to the reservation were subjected to the American "civilizing" process; pushed to adopt Christianity, stop speaking their language, and in general, adopt the way of life of White Americans. Goods were distributed by federal officials to reservations, but Indian agents often misused or sold these goods. On the reservation, many people began having to work for white farmers or dispersed into local towns. Reservations could never provide adequate employment for the whole tribe; even in 1985 the Chehalis Reservation had an unemployment rate of 39 percent.

In 1877, ethnologist George Gibbs estimated that the tribe had a population of around 216. Around this time, the Upper Chehalis had lost one of their most influential leaders, Tsinnitieh. A man named Gowannus was recognized to be the head of the tribe by the Indian Agents, but he did not have the level of influence of Tsinnitieh.

== Culture ==
The traditional culture (at the beginning of the 19th century) of the Upper Chehalis is closely related to other Southwestern Coast Salish groups, although they have their regional differences. The primary staple food was historically fish, with salmon being an important component. The Chehalis River and its tributaries supports runs of several types of salmon, including chinook, chum, and coho. Each year, the spring salmon runs are celebrated by the First Salmon ceremony. Traditionally, the Upper Chehalis ceremonially caught and prepared a salmon, which was then eaten communally by the members of the village. Village leaders or doctors would have the right to eat first. Members of the Confederated Tribes of the Chehalis Reservation continue to celebrate this ceremony. In the early morning, the first spring chinook caught by the tribe is taken and prepared, then released down the Chehalis River, and a feast is held for members of the tribe. Today, the tribe has used the ceremony to practice traditional culture and call attention to issues affecting the tribe, such as low salmon runs.

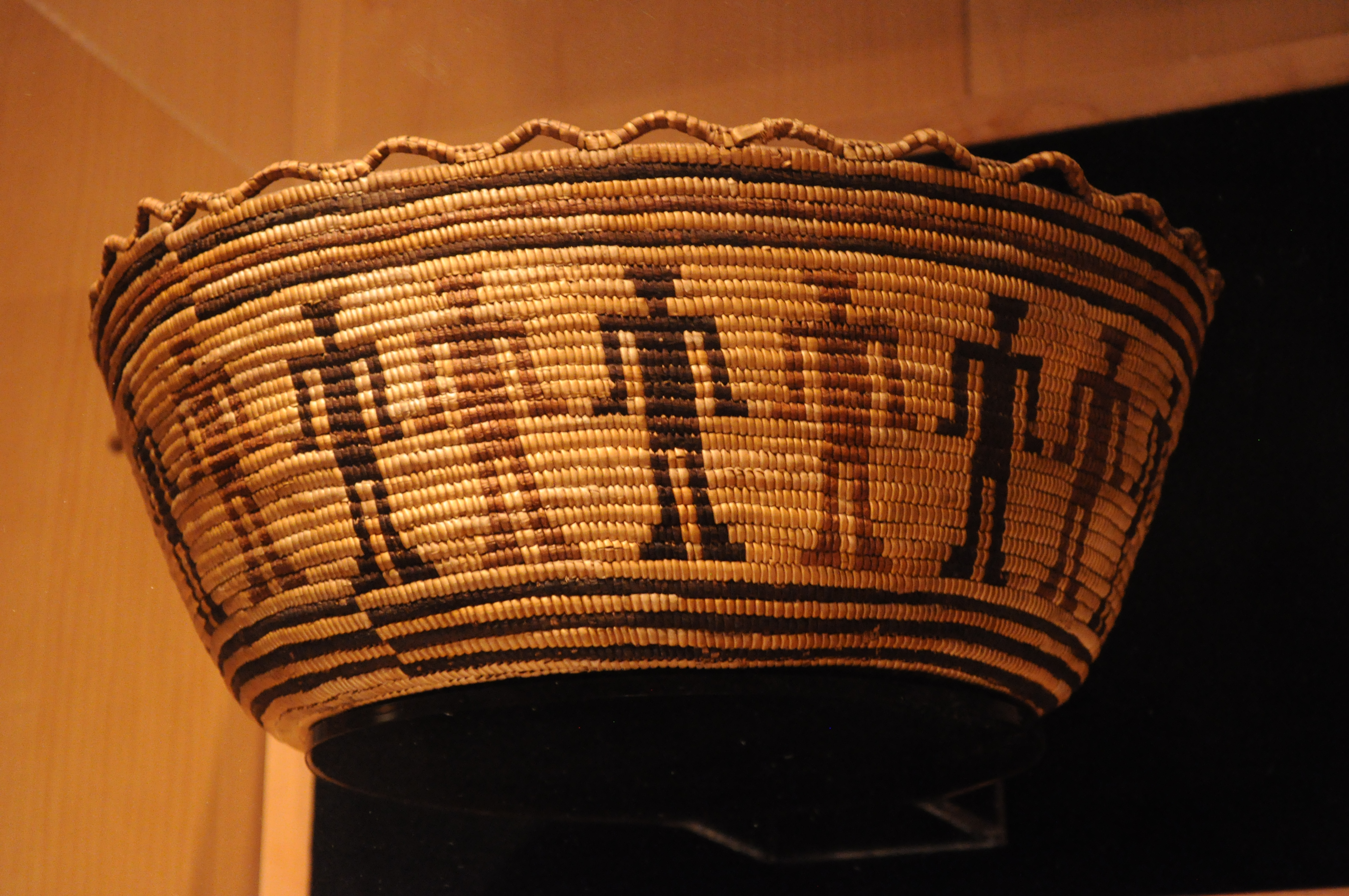
A Chehalis cedar basket

The Upper Chehalis also historically utilized plant resources, such as berries, nuts, roots, and camas. Camas in particular, was a major product of the Upper Chehalis prairies, and it was one of their main exports to other neighboring groups. Camas was traditionally roasted in a pit and then made into cakes to be dried.

The Upper Chehalis are a potlatch culture. Traditionally, there were two types of potlatches. One was a great intertribal potlatch in which other groups were invited, and the other was the small local potlatch, which only locals attended. Upper Chehalis traditionally held potlatches for many reasons, including for naming ceremonies, honoring the dead, celebrating the arrival of puberty for a girl, weddings, the piercing of children's ears, to resolve conflicts, and for religious reasons. A potlatch was used to raise one's social standing, and village leaders who did not hold potlatches could lose their positions.

Water travel was the main method of travel for the Upper Chehalis during the early 19th century, and they were skilled canoe handlers. The Upper Chehalis did not use the typical West Coast canoe like their ocean-oriented neighbors, only using shovelnose canoes (due to their inland location). After the introduction of horses, the Upper Chehalis enthusiastically adopted their use. Early ethnographers in the 19th century described them as "equestrian" compared to other people in the area. Gibbs classified the Upper Chehalis and Nisqually into a subgrouping of Salishan peoples, which he described as inhabiting prairie country and depending on horses to a much higher degree than their neighbors.

The Upper Chehalis historically built large gable-roofed houses made of cedar planks. Houses were typically built east–west along the river, and Upper Chehalis houses held on average 8-12 families each, much larger than their downstream neighbors. The floor was excavated about a foot deep and walls were lined with mats. Along the walls ran a 4 ft-wide (1.2 m) by 4 ft-high sleeping platform and a shorter bench below it for sitting. Empty space below the platforms was reserved for storage.

=== Traditional religion ===
The traditional religious life revolved around one's personal relationship to guardian spirits, also called powers or spirit powers. Spirits were owned by men, women, and slaves. Training to acquire powers started at a very early age, typically seven or eight, and a quest was taken around adolescence. People could also acquire spirits later in life. Those with reputation for special powers, usually called shamans, had responsibility for diagnosing and curing illnesses, usually those of the spirit, although diseases of "natural" causes were also identified. These shamans were highly respected and were paid well for their services, but they were also feared, as they could use their power for death as well.

== Society ==
=== 19th century ===
Like other Southwestern Coast Salish peoples, the Upper Chehalis society in the 1800s was divided into two classes: slave and free. Villages were led by wealthy men who were able to distribute their wealth to others by means of the potlatch. Leadership usually passed down through the eldest son or other male relatives. If there were multiple candidates, they were selected by other members of the village, although leaders tended to come from certain families. The primary role of the village leader was to advise matters in the village and resolve disputes, but had no power of punishment. The Upper Chehalis likely had a position of "speaker" as did the Quinault, a person chosen to announce the chief's intentions to other members of the village.

Slaves were prisoners of war or bought from other groups. Freed slaves usually carried a social stigma from their enslavement. Slaves could marry free individuals, however it was discouraged. Slaves were most ideally taken from distant groups, so that their people would be less likely to attempt a rescue, nor would it be likely for slaves to have familial ties to people in the locality.

The highest unit of political organization in this era was the village. "Tribes" as discussed in literature were groups that lived in a common area and spoke a common tongue, but there was no cohesive political organization at this level. Villages were composed of several houses, each owned by one or more heads of the household, typically a married man, or a group of brothers or cousins. A household was composed of the head of house, his wives, unmarried children, adult sons and their wives, their children, poor relatives, slaves, and visitors. Each head of house who contributed to the building of the house owned a section. These household leaders directed family activities, and owned the resources of the family such as weirs. On the death of the head of household, his eldest son succeeded him (or his male next of kin if there were no sons). Remaining members of the household might tear down the house and rebuild nearby, either with other households in the house or by themselves.

== Confederated Tribes of the Chehalis Reservation ==
The Upper Chehalis are succeeded by the federally-recognized Confederated Tribes of the Chehalis Reservation. In the 1980s, the tribe had a population of 425. The Chehalis Reservation is 4,215 acres (1,706 ha), with less than 50% owned by Native Americans, and only 1,952 acres (790 ha) are held in trust.
