= Confederated Tribes of the Chehalis Reservation =

Federally recognized tribe in Washington state

Chehalis Tribe
- Federally recognized Indian tribe
- Confederated Tribes of the Chehalis Reservation
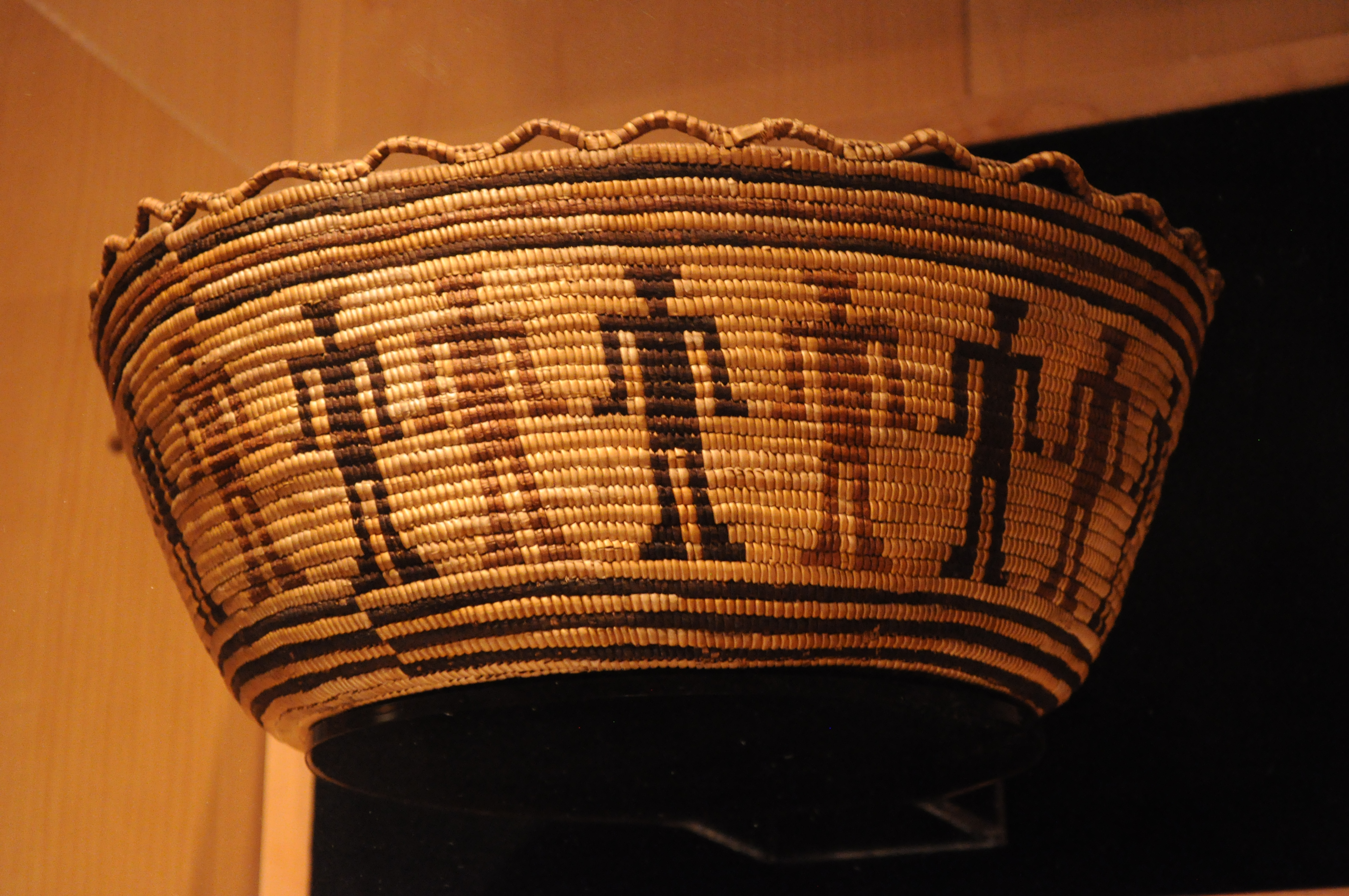
- Chehalis coiled cedar root basket, created c. 1880 – c. 1910

- Location of the Confederated Tribes of the Chehalis Reservation in Washington

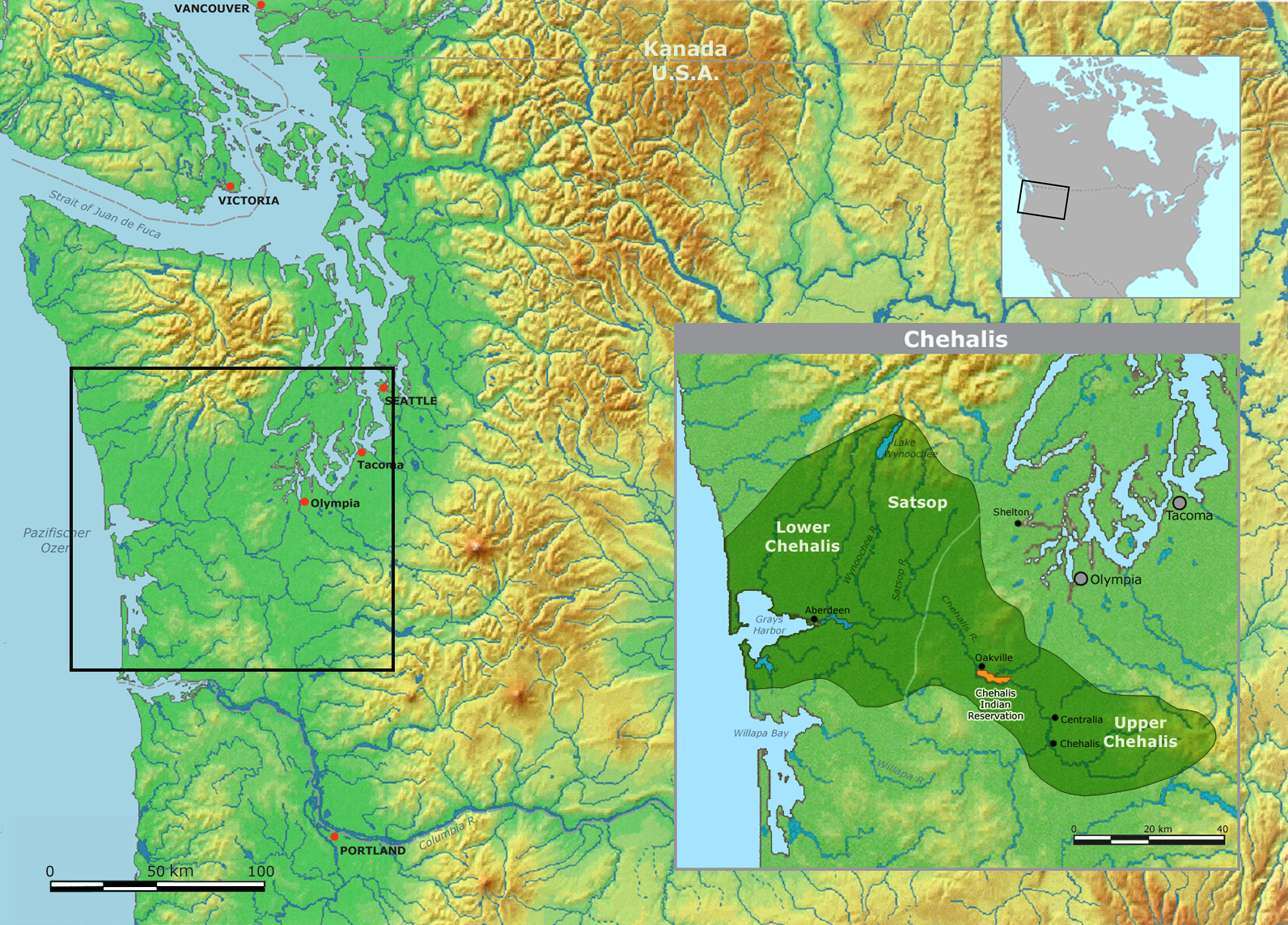
- Lower Chehalis and Upper Chehalis traditional territories, with the Chehalis Reservation highlighted in orange
- Coordinates: 46°49′04″N 123°11′42″W
- Country: United States
- State: Washington
- Counties: Grays Harbor and Thurston
- Population (2020): 978 enrolled members
- Website: www.chehalistribe.org

The Confederated Tribes of the Chehalis Reservation is a federally recognized tribe of primarily Lower Chehalis and Upper Chehalis people located in Washington. The tribe governs the Chehalis Reservation, which is located along the Chehalis and Black rivers in the vicinity of Oakville, Washington.

== History ==
The name "Chehalis" derives from c̓x̣íl̕əš, the name of principal village of the Lower Chehalis people and what is today Westport, Washington. The name, which means "sand", originally only replied to that village and its inhabitants. After colonization, it became the name of the Chehalis River and a collective term to refer to both the Upper and Lower Chehalis peoples living along it as a whole. The traditional territory of the Lower and Upper Chehalis peoples included the Chehalis River and its tributaries, including the Black, Cowlitz, Elk, Johns, Newaukum, Satsop, Skookumchuck, and Wynoochee rivers.

The Upper and Lower Chehalis people were never party to any ratified treaty. In 1864, a 4,224.63 acres (17.10 km^{2}) reservation was formally established by executive order for the Upper and Lower Chehalis peoples in 1864. On October 1, 1866, another executive order opened up 3,753.63 acres (15.19 km^{2}) to homesteading by non-Native settlers. 471 acres (1.91 km^{2}) of the total reservation lands were retained for schooling. Another section of the reservation was taken into public domain by the federal government on November 11, 1909.

The Confederated Tribes of the Chehalis Reservation was formally established through the creation of its constitution and bylaws on July 15, 1939.

In 1906, the population of the tribe was 149. In 1984, the population had grown to 382.

== Government ==
The Confederated Tribes of the Chehalis Reservation is governed by the Chehalis Community Council. All eligible Chehalis voters can participate in the Community Council. The Chehalis Community Council is responsible for enforcing tribal ordinances, as well as electing a Business Council, which manages the administration of the tribes, its properties, and its assets.

The tribe's headquarters are in Chehalis Village, Washington. The existing constitution and bylaws were ratified on July 15, 1939.

=== Chairmen ===
As of November 2022, Dustin Klatush serves as the current Chairman of the Confederated Tribes of the Chehalis.

Past chairmen include:

- Harry Pickernell Sr. (2017–2023)
- Don Secena (2015 -2017)
- David Burnett

== Reservation ==
The Chehalis Reservation ranges 4,438 acres (17.96 km^{2}), and is home to more than 600 American Indians. The reservation was first established in 1860 for the Lower and Upper Chehalis people. Originally 4,224.63 acres (17.10 km^{2}) larger, 3,753.63 acres (15.19 km^{2}) of land was distributed to non-native settlers in 1866 via Executive Order. An additional 471 acres (1.91 km^{2}) was given to schools. By 1906, fewer than 150 Chehalis people remained on the reservation and a 1984 survey found the population to be 382.

== Economy ==
The Chehalis Tribe owns and operates Lucky Eagle Casino, Eagle's Landing Hotel, Craft House Diner, Cafe and Espresso, Prime Rib and Steakhouse, and Lil Caesar's in Rochester, and the Great Wolf Lodge Resort and Talking Cedar Brewing in Grand Mound. It also owns three convenience stores, a fast food restaurant, two construction companies, and a cigarette stamping business. The tribe employs 1,498 people.

== Language ==
English has become the common spoken language of the Tribe. Traditional languages include the Upper Chehalis and Lower Chehalis languages, which is a Coast Salish language. The last native speaker of the Upper Chehalis language died in 2001.
