= Upper Chehalis language =

Extinct Salishan langage in Washington state

Upper Chehalis
- q̓ʷay̓áyiɬq̓
- Native to: United States
- Region: south of Olympic Peninsula, Washington
- Ethnicity: Upper Chehalis people
- Extinct: 2001
- Language family: Salishan: Coast; Tsamosan; Inland; Upper Chehalis
- Dialects: Satsop; Oakville Chehalis; Tenino Chehalis

Language codes
- ISO 639-3: cjh
- Glottolog: uppe1439
- Upper Chehalis is classified as Extinct by the UNESCO Atlas of the World's Languages in Danger.

- People: sq̓ʷay̓áíɬq̓
- Language: q̓ʷay̓áíɬq̓
- Country: sq̓ʷay̓áiɬaqtmš

Upper Chehalis (/ʃəˈheɪlɪs/ shə-HAY-liss; Upper Chehalis: q̓ʷay̓áyiɬq̓) is a Tsamosan language historically spoken by the Satsop and Upper Chehalis people in western Washington state.

== Classification ==
Upper Chehalis is within the Tsamosan branch of the Salishan language family. Within the Tsamosan languages, Upper Chehalis is within the Inland branch, alongside Cowlitz. Despite its name, it is more closely related to Cowlitz than Lower Chehalis, which is within the Maritime branch alongside Quinault.

The Proto-Salish language likely originated north on the Salish Sea, near the mouth of the Fraser River. The ancestors of the speakers of the Tsamosan branch likely branched off around the same time as the Interior Salishan languages branched off, settling south of Puget Sound, eventually occupying as far as the Pacific Coast. These speakers were the ancestors of the Tsamosan languages today. Before they reached the coast, another branch headed further south and became the ancestors of the Tillamook language on the Oregon Coast.

== Dialects ==
Upper Chehalis has three dialects: Satsop, Oakville Chehalis, and Tenino Chehalis. Because of the lack of data, the exact boundaries of these dialects cannot be determined. Kinkade supposed that Tenino was spoken upriver of Grand Mound, and that of the five Upper Chehalis bands, the sɬačáw̓am̓š and sq̓ʷay̓áyiɬq̓ spoke Oakville Chehalis, while the ɬmə́šluws, ʔílawiqs, and c̓ax̣ʷásn̓ spoke Tenino Chehalis. Kinkade himself coined the terms "Oakville Chehalis" and "Tenino Chehalis"; previously they had been called "Upper Chehalis 1" and "Upper Chehalis 2" by Franz Boas. The Tenino dialect had also been referred to as "Staktamish".

The distinguishing feature between Tenino Chehalis and Oakville Chehalis is the phonemes [tʃ] [tʃʼ] and [ʃ] in Oakville and [k] [kʼ] and [x] in Tenino. The Tenino dialect is thus connected to the neighboring Cowlitz language, which also uses [k] [kʼ] and [x].

The Satsop dialect was originally spoken by the Satsop people. Although they spoke Upper Chehalis, they were more closely affiliated with the Lower Chehalis groups downriver. For this reason, Satsop contains many vocabulary items from the Lower Chehalis language.

== History ==
The language was originally spoken on the Chehalis River in southwestern Washington, from around Elma upriver to Rainbow Falls. In Upper Chehalis, the language and people are called q̓ʷay̓áyiɬq̓, derived from the name for Mud Bay, q̓ʷayáiɬ, suggesting that it was probably at one point also spoken along Mud Bay on Puget Sound. The language was spoken by the Satsop on the Satsop River and the five aboriginal bands of Upper Chehalis on the Chehalis River: the sq̓ʷay̓áyiɬq̓ on the Black River and Mud Bay, the sɬačáw̓am̓š around Oakville, the ɬmə́šluws around Tenino, the ʔílawiqs around Chehalis, and the c̓ax̣ʷásn̓ around Pe-Ell and Boistfort.

By the 1970s, the language was moribund with only one competent speaker remaining. In 1991, an Upper Chehalis dictionary was published by linguist M. Dale Kinkade. Most of the material in the language was compiled from two primary sources in the 1960s and 1970s: Silas Heck and Lillian Young, two native speakers living on the Chehalis Reservation. Other secondary sources were used, including other Chehalis people living on the reservation and in nearby communities who knew some of the language, as well as tapes made in the 1950s by Leon Metcalf and other collected notes on vocabulary from a variety of sources.

== Phonology ==
Consonants
		Bilabial	Alveolar			Palatal	Velar		Uvular		Glottal
		Bilabial	median	sibilant	lateral	Palatal	plain	lab.	plain	lab.	Glottal
Plosive/ Affricate	plain	p	t	ts		tʃ	k	kʷ	q	qʷ	ʔ
Plosive/ Affricate	ejective	pʼ	tʼ	tsʼ	tɬʼ	tʃʼ	kʼ	kʷʼ	qʼ	qʷʼ	ʔ
Fricative				s	ɬ	ʃ		xʷ	χ	χʷ	h
Sonorant		m	n		l	j		w			

Vowels
	Front	Central	Back
Mid	e	ə	o
Open		a	

== Alphabet ==
The Upper Chehalis language uses a variation of the Americanist phonetic notation, itself a variant of the International Phonetic Alphabet.

In Upper Chehalis, long vowels and sequences of vowel-glottal stop are in free variation but are represented with a long vowel, marked with '·', such as 'a·' or 'e·'. Otherwise, vowel length is ignored in writing. Additionally, an epenthetic /ə/ is regularly added before resonants in consonant clusters and after initial resonants followed by consonants; this is not written either.

Stress is marked with an acute accent ◌́.

Upper Chehalis alphabet (Kinkade 1991)
Letter	IPA	Notes
ʔ	/ʔ/	
a	/ɑ/	
b	/b/	Only used in loanwords, typically from Lushootseed
c	/t͡s/	
c̓	/t͡sʼ/	
č	/t͡ʃ/	
č̓	/t͡ʃʼ/	
d	/d/	Only used in loanwords, typically from Lushootseed
dᶻ	/d͡z/	Only used in loanwords, typically from Lushootseed
e	/æ/	
ə	/ə/	
g	/ɡ/	Only used in loanwords, typically from Lushootseed
h	/h/	
i	/e~i~ɪ/	
k	/k/	
k̓	/kʼ/	
kʷ	/kʷ/	
k̓ʷ	/kʷʼ/	
l	/l/	
l̓	/l̰/	
ɬ	/ɬ/	
ƛ̓	/t͜ɬʼ/	
m	/m/	
m̓	/m̰/	
n	/n/	
n̓	/n̰/	
o	/ɔ/	
p	/p/	
p̓	/pʼ/	
q	/q/	
q̓	/qʼ/	
qʷ	/qʷ/	
q̓ʷ	/qʷʼ/	
s	/s/	
š	/ʃ/	
t	/t/	
t̓	/tʼ/	
u	/o~ʊ~u/	
w	/w/	
w̓	/w̰/	
x	/x/	
xʷ	/xʷ/	
x̣	/χ/	
x̣ʷ	/χʷ/	
y	/j/	
y̓	/j̰/	

== Vocabulary ==
Salmon names in Upper Chehalis
	Chinook	Black (Note: "Black salmon" refers to a Chinook salmon run that comes in the fall after the main springtime run)	Silver	Dog	Sockeye	Humpback	Steelhead
Satsop	c̓áwɬ		sč̓ám̓t	qʷəɬáɬc̓ən̓	ƛ̕ə́lq̓ʷuɬn; sqám̓x̌ʔ	paníkʷ	sqíw̓x̣
Oakville	c̓áwɬ	k̓ʷalé·ʔ		snúnxʷ	sáwanxʷ	c̓iqúps	sqíw̓x̣
Tenino	c̓áwɬ	k̓ʷalé·ʔ		snúnxʷ	sáwanxʷ	x̣ʷaníkʷ; xʷəméčən	sqíw̓x̣
