= Sinixt dialect =

Colville-Okanagan dialect of North America

Sinixt
- (Arrow) Lakes
- snsəlxcín
- Native to: Canada, United States
- Region: British Columbia, Washington
- Ethnicity: Sinixt people
- Native speakers: 30 (2022)
- Language family: Salishan: Interior Salish; Southern; Okanagan; Sinixt

Language codes
- ISO 639-3: –
- Glottolog: lake1256

Sinixt (snsəlxcín) is one of multiple distinct dialects of the Colville-Okanagan language. It is part of the Southern Interior Salish sub-grouping of the Salishan Language family. Traditionally spoken among the Sinixt People of the southern Interior Plateau region and based primarily in the Columbia River Basin, it is closely related to other Interior Salish languages and dialects. As of 2022, it had around 30 first-language speakers.

Six of the twelve tribes which make up the Colville Confederated Tribes speak Sinixt:

- the suknaqínx (Okanagan/Sylix)
- sn̓ʕay̓ckstx (Sinixt/Arrow Lakes)
- mətxʷu (Methow)
- nspil̓m̓ (Nespelem)
- sn̓pʕaw̓ilx (Sanpoil)
- sx̌ʷy̓iłpx (Colville).

== Nomenclature ==
Linguists named Salishan Plateau languages based in the land on which they are spoken, and, since colonization and the relocation of Interior Salish families, the differences between these languages are not as well-known today, and a more generalized language has come into use. However, the Sinixt Nation, an unrecognized First Nation in Canada states on its website that it wishes to preserve the language with its unique dialectic differences, as exactly as possible, no matter how insignificant the pronunciation differences may be between the various dialects. The Sinixt also "encourage people working to save the language to respect these dialects whenever possible and to honor them."

The Sinixt Nation website also states that "originally there were two versions of the language for Sinixt peoples, one for the men (snskəlxʷcín or language of humans) and one for the women (snsəlxcín or language of water). Both of these dialects were understood by all Sinixt people but reserved for speaking only by the determined sex." The language used today "is a combination of the two."

Scottish-Canadian anthropologist James Teit noted in 1909 that the Sinixt dialect was distinguished from other Plateau Salishan dialects by the slow and measured manner in which it was spoken. f

The endonym n̓səl̓xčin̓, also written as n̓syil̓xčn̓ or nsyilxcn, is derived from the word sil̓x, which can also be spelled syil̓x or syilx. Sil̓x means "Salish people" and does not refer to a specific band. It is used to refer to all Salish people, but especially Sinixt speakers. The addition of n̓– čin̓, n̓–čn̓ or n–cn turns the word into n̓səl̓xčin̓, meaning "Salish people's language".

== Written record ==
Randy Bouchard and Dorothy Kennedy record fur trader Alexander Ross as the first person "to record an identification of the Lakes (Sinixt) people" by a transcription of their name, in September 1821."

Anthropologists Franz Boas, James Teit and Verne Ray, and explorers George Mercer Dawson, James Turnbull, and Walter Moberly (engineer) all added to the extant written record of Sinixt words and place names

James Teit's information was recorded in consultation with Antoinette Christian and her family, who lived at kp̓íƛ̓ls (Brilliant, British Columbia). Verne Ray spoke with James Bernard, who was chief of the Sinixt up to 1934. William Elmendorf, whose findings are not published, consulted with Nancy Wynecoop, who was born around 1865.

According to anthropologist Paula Pryce, the categorization of the Sinixt Dialect "shows a kind of academic chaos" with an inconsistency of terminology "caus(ing) disarray not only for anthropologists and historians, but also for governments and for the public..." Some of this confusion is the direct result of changing practices in documentation, particularly in respect to Teit's research, which often utilized inconsistent orthography and typography during the early years of his documentation, but became more standardized later on. In many cases, the confusion also stems from various researchers, including Boas and Teit having had difficulty distinguishing certain sounds (and how they were created) from each other.

It is the opinion of historian Eileen Delehanty Pearkes that the mapping and renaming of geographical features by Europeans has "helped erase the presence of Aboriginal human culture which thrived in the Columbia Basin for thousands of years." Pearkes further states that "in some cases, even place names which are anglicized versions of Sinixt Interior Salish dialect words (E.g. Nakusp, Slocan, Comaplix) are not recognized by most contemporary residents as being linked to the region's First People."

== Phonology ==
=== Alphabet ===
Sinixt alphabet
a	c	ć	ə	h	i	k	ḱ	kʷ	ḱʷ	l	l̓	ł	ƛ̓	m	ḿ	n	ń	p	ṕ	q	q'ʷ
r	ŕ	s	t	ť	u	w	ẃ	x	x̌	x̌ʷ	y	ý	ɣ	ʔ	ʕ	ʕʼ	ʕʷ	ʕʼʷ			

== Vocabulary ==
=== Numerals ===
==== Numbers 1-10 ====
English	Sinixt
1	naqs
2	ʔasíl
3	kaʔłís
4	mus
5	cilkst
6	t ̓ aq ̓ əmkst
7	sisp ̓ əlk
8	timł
9	x̌əx̌n̓út
10	ʔupnkst

== Revitalization ==
The Sinixt Nation website states that they "aim to create teaching aids and activity books for children and adults which will be accessible to all" on their website. In 2021, Smum iem and Maa Press Publishing and Distribution created a map of Sinixt təmxʷúlaʔxʷ (territory) with place names labeled in Snsəlxcín.
