= Chehalis River (disambiguation) =

The Chehalis River may refer to:

- Chehalis River (Washington), in the United States
- Chehalis River (British Columbia), in Canada

== See also ==
- Chehalis (disambiguation)
