= Tichipawa =

Douglas fir tree in Washington state, USA

Tichipawa (meaning "thunderbolt" in the Quinault language) is a superlative Douglas fir near Lake Quinault in the U.S. state of Washington. The tree is 281 feet (86 m) tall. It was listed as 275 feet (84 m) tall in 2002, four years after it was discovered by The Evergreen State College forestry researcher and author Robert Van Pelt, in March 1998.
