= Salish peoples =

Broad classification of Indigenous peoples of Western Canada and United States

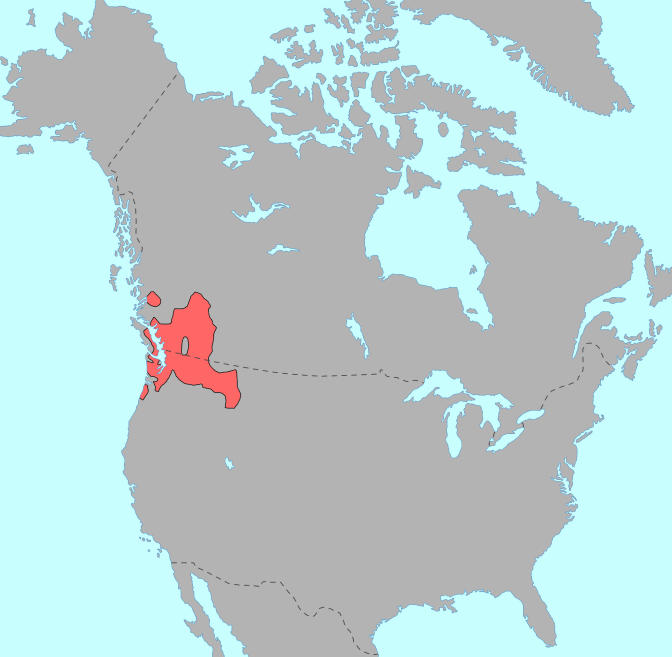
Precontact distribution of Salishan languages in red

The Salish peoples is a grouping defined by linguists of the Indigenous peoples who speak or historically spoke the Salishan languages.

These people and languages are split into three distinct branches:

- Nuxalk
- Coast Salish peoples
- Interior Salish peoples

The term "Salish" originated in the modern era as an exonym created for linguistic research. Salish is an anglicization of Séliš, the endonym for the Salish Tribes of the Flathead Reservation. The Séliš were the easternmost Salish people and the first to have a diplomatic relationship with the United States, so their name was applied broadly to all peoples speaking a related language.

The language family may have originated in the Fraser River delta, near present-day Vancouver, British Columbia.

== Nuxalk ==
The Nuxalk speak the Nuxalk language and are an Indigenous people of the Pacific Northwest Coast. They primarily live in Bella Coola area, Central Coast region of British Columbia in Canada.

== Coast Salish ==
Map of Coast Salish linguistic distribution in the early to mid-19th century

Coast Salish peoples speak Coast Salish languages and are Indigenous peoples of the Pacific Northwest Coast. They primarily live on the west coasts of British Columbia, Washington, and Oregon.

== Interior Salish ==
Interior Salish peoples speak Interior Salish languages and are Indigenous peoples of the Northwest Plateau. They primarily live in inland British Columbia, eastern Washington, northern Idaho, and western Montana.

== Overview of Salish languages ==
- Salishan
  - Nuxalk
    - Nuxalk
  - Coast Salish
    - Central Salish
    - Tsamosan
    - Tillamook
  - Interior Salish
    - Northern
    - Southern
