= Lower Chehalis people =

Lower Chehalis
Regions with significant populations
- Washington, United States

Languages
- Lower Chehalis language

Religion
- Indigenous religion, Christianity

Related ethnic groups
- Quinault people, Upper Chehalis people, Cowlitz people

The Lower Chehalis (/ʃəˈheɪlɪs/ shə-HAY-liss) are a Southwestern Coast Salish people indigenous to Washington state. Today, the Lower Chehalis do not maintain a distinct sovereign identity, although people of Lower Chehalis descent are enrolled in several federally recognized tribes, such as the Shoalwater Bay Indian Tribe, Confederated Tribes of the Chehalis Reservation, and the Quinault Indian Nation.

== Classification and name ==
The Lower Chehalis are a Southwestern Coast Salish people, a group of four related peoples who speak closely related languages. The other three Southwestern Coast Salish include the Quinault people, Upper Chehalis people, and the Cowlitz people. The Lower Chehalis are more closely related to the Quinault than they are to the Upper Chehalis.

Historically, the Lower Chehalis were not united. Instead, several villages which spoke a common language and resided in a common geographical area were grouped together. Early American treatymakers saw these groupings as "tribes" or "bands", but anthropologist Barbara Lane stated that "tribes" as seen in early literature were "fictive political units that had no basis in native society". The highest level of official political organization was the village level. The historical groupings that spoke Lower Chehalis include:

- Chehalis proper (c̓x̣íl̕əš; on the south shore of Grays Harbor)
- Humptulips (x̣ʷəmtúl̕apš; on the north shore of Grays Harbor and along the Humptulips River)
  - Hoquiam (along the Hoquiam River)
  - Wishkah (along the Wishkah River)
- Wynoochee (xʷənúɬč; along the Wynoochee River)
- Shoalwater/Willapa Bay Chehalis (On the north end of Willapa Bay and the lower Willapa River)

Today, the name "Lower Chehalis" refers to all these groups combined.

Nineteenth-century ethnologist George Gibbs classified the Satsop as a Lower Chehalis group, but modern ethnographers classify them as belonging to the Upper Chehalis dialect group.

=== Name ===
The name "Chehalis" comes from the Lower Chehalis name c̓x̣íl̕əš, the name for the principal village of the Chehalis proper, located at what is now Westport. The name c̓x̣íl̕əš literally means "sand". "Chehalis" has also been spelled Tsihalis, Tsihailish, and Chikailish. Chehalis is also what the Sts'ailes of British Columbia were formerly called.

== Territory ==
During the first half of the 19th century, the Lower Chehalis occupied the area around Willapa Bay and the lower Chehalis River from its mouth to the Wynoochee River.

The Chehalis proper occupied the southern shore of Grays Harbor, at the mouth of the Chehalis River. Their main village was at what is now Westport. In total, contemporary reports indicated that there were five villages on the river itself, as well as seven on the north side of the bay, and eight on the south side of the bay.

== History ==
In 1792, Robert Gray visited Grays Harbor and the Lower Chehalis. A contemporary leader of the Chehalis, Kaukauan, recalled that they were given weapons and tools by Gray. The earliest recorded mention of the Lower Chehalis is later that year, when fur trader John Boit mentioned that he saw people at the Columbia River whom he had previously seen at Grays Harbor. Around the beginning of the 19th century, there were an estimated 1,500–2,000 Lower Chehalis. After the creation of Fort Vancouver, the Lower Chehalis became involved in a trade network spanning between the Southwestern Coast Salish and Southern Coast Salish on Puget Sound. The Lower Chehalis were so important in the trade networks of the time that Hudson's Bay Company (HBC) ships anchored in the bay often had rooms in them reserved for important Lower Chehalis visitors. In 1824, the Lower Chehalis feared an attack from fur traders. In an effort to assuage tensions and regain the trust of the Chehalises, the HBC trader John Work distributed tobacco to members of the tribe.

In the 1830s, a malaria epidemic devastated the lower Columbia Valley, shifting the organization and composition of local peoples. The Lower Chehalis and Lower Chinook inhabiting Willapa Bay merged, becoming a bilingual population (today the Shoalwater Bay Indian Tribe), with Lower Chehalis eventually replacing Chinook. This group in turn would eventually absorb the Kwalhioqua living on the bay as well, whose territory was then filled by Sahaptin-speaking groups.

Around the early 19th century, the leader of the main Chehalis village at Westport was a "very old man" named Kakowan. He was succeeded by his son, Tuleuk, in the mid-19th century.

After the 1846 Oregon Treaty and the 1850 Donation Land Claim Act, American settlers began to displace Indigenous peoples in the region. By this time, the Lower Chehalis population had dropped to around 400. Around 1854, ethnographer George Gibbs estimated that there were around 100 Lower Chehalises on Grays Harbor and the lower Chehalis River. In 1855, he reported that the population was 217. In order to extinguish Indian title, territorial governor Isaac Stevens began a treaty process in the spring of 1855. Stevens called the Lower Chehalis and several other groups, including the Chinook, Quinault, Queets, Satsop, Upper Chehalis, and Cowlitz, to treat with the United States and cede their lands. Stevens' policy was to concentrate as many Indians on as few reservations as possible, and a sole reservation was proposed between the Makah and Grays Harbor. Stevens ignored pleadings that two reservations be established. The Lower Chehalis (along with other groups) refused to leave their homes and live with the Quinault, and Stevens cancelled the treaty process. Although the Quinault were later given their own treaty, the Lower Chehalis were never given another chance for a treaty. Despite this, the government would succeed in obtaining the title to Chehalis land without compensation.

In 1857, Indian agent J.W. Nesmith recommended a treaty be concluded with the Upper and Lower Chehalises and the Cowlitz, so that their claims to the land could be extinguished. In 1858, agents reported that the Lower Chehalis were facilitating a liquor trade across the coast of Washington state.

An unofficial reservation where the Cowlitz and Upper Chehalis had begun living was made official on July 8, 1864, by executive order, and the Lower Chehalis were directed to remove to it; however, most did not, preferring to stay in their homes. The Humptulips and Shoalwater Bay Indians outright refused to take any goods distributed to them by White authorities in fear that by taking them, they would be ceding their land to the United States. Those that moved to the reservation were subjected to the "civilizing" process: forced to adopt Christianity, stop speaking their language, and adopt the White way of living. Goods were distributed to reservation agents by the federal government; however, they were often sold by the agents or misused. Some who did not move to reservations joined non-Indian communities and assimilated.

In 1887, the Lower Chehalis made up a significant portion of the peoples on the Quinault Reservation. Besides the 61 Hoh, 85 Queets, and 107 Quinaults, the Lower Chehalis population included 36 Ayhut, 5 Chehalis, 16 Humptulips, 16 Hoquiam, 16 Wynoochee, and 69 Shoalwater Bay Chehalis, for a total of 158 Lower Chehalis. There were also 12 Satsop at the time, as well as 3 people of mixed race.

The Lower Chehalis were not compensated for their lands until 1960, when the Indian Claims Commission decided on their claims.

== Culture ==
The traditional culture of the Lower Chehalis was widely influenced by their maritime environment, and was closely related to their neighbors, with local variation. Fish was the staple of a traditional diet, and several types of salmon are available in the Lower Chehalis region, including chinook, chum, and coho, which run on the Chehalis and its tributaries. Lower Chehalis also historically travelled south to the Columbia River to partake in the large summer chinook runs. Plants were also used by the Lower Chehalis, including nuts, berries, roots, and camas, but were less important to their diet than to their inland neighbors. The Lower Chehalis often traded harvested camas to the inland tribes for whom it was a major resource. Other resources the Lower Chehalis traded to their inland neighbors included clams, sturgeon, and seal oil.

Historically, water travel was the main method of travel for the Lower Chehalis due to the high levels of vegetation in their territory, thus the Lower Chehalis were highly skilled canoers and swimmers. Canoes typically resembled the normal West Coast canoe style, except for the shovelnose canoe.

Traditionally, the Lower Chehalis built gable-roofed houses made of cedar planks. Houses were typically oriented east–west along the river in a row, and held between two and four families on average. On the inside, the floor was excavated about a foot deep, or perhaps deeper, and walls were lined with mats. Along the walls ran a 4 ft-wide (1.2 m) by 4 ft-high sleeping platform and a shorter bench below it for sitting. Empty space below the platforms was reserved for storage.

The Lower Chehalis likely historically participated in the potlatch system as did their neighbors. Traditionally, two types of potlatches were held: the intertribal potlatch and the local potlatch, to which only local people were invited. The Lower Chehalis might have also participated in the secret societies of the Makah and Quileute through intermarriage.

=== Traditional religion ===
The traditional religious life revolved around one's personal relationship to guardian spirits, also called powers or spirit powers. Spirits were owned by men, women, and slaves. Training to acquire powers started at a very early age, typically seven or eight, and a quest was taken around adolescence. People could also acquire spirits later in life. People with powerful powers, usually called shamans, were tasked with diagnosing and curing illnesses, usually those of the spirit, although diseases of "natural" causes were also identified. These shamans were highly respected and were paid well for their services, but they were also feared, as they could use their power for death as well.

=== Language ===
The Lower Chehalis traditionally spoke the Lower Chehalis language, a Tsamosan language. The Tsamosan languages are a division of the Salishan language family. Lower Chehalis is closely related to the Quinault language.

== Society ==
=== 19th century ===
During the 19th century, Lower Chehalis society was divided into two classes: slave and free. The free class may have had distinctions between nobles and commoners like other Coast Salish groups. Villages were led by wealthy men who were able to distribute their wealth to others by means of the potlatch. Leadership usually passed down through the eldest son or other male relatives. If there were multiple candidates, they were selected by other members of the village, although leaders tended to come from certain families. The primary role of the village leader was to advise matters in the village and resolve disputes, but had no power of punishment. The Lower Chehalis likely had a position of "speaker" as did the Quinault, a person chosen to announce the chief's intentions to other members of the village.

Slaves were prisoners of war or bought from other groups. Freed slaves usually carried a social stigma from their enslavement. Slaves could marry free individuals; however, it was discouraged. Slaves were most ideally taken from distant groups, so that their people would be less likely to attempt a rescue, nor would it be likely for slaves to have familial ties to people in the locality.

The largest political unit in this era was the village. The "tribes" as described in early literature were groups of people who had shared linguistic and geographic ties, but there was no formal organization at this level. Villages held several houses, typically consisting of one to ten houses, supporting a population roughly between 25 and 300 people (although larger settlements were reported). Each house had several households, led by a head of household, typically a married man or a group of brothers or cousins. Other members of the household included the wife, unmarried children, married sons and their wives, poor relatives, slaves, and visitors. Houses were owned by those who contributed labor or resources to building, with each leading man owning his and his family's section. The head of house would also direct family operations, such as weir construction, in which one section of a weir was owned by the family. Upon their death, the "ownership" of a house would pass on to the eldest son or other kin. Households might tear down their house and rebuild nearby together, or constituent households might build separate private homes elsewhere.

== Successor tribes ==
Today, Lower Chehalis descendants are enrolled in several federally-recognized tribes:

The Shoalwater Bay Indian Tribe is composed of the descendants of the Shoalwater Bay Indians, those who came from the merger of the Lower Chehalis, Lower Chinook, and Kwalhioqua peoples after the 1830s smallpox epidemic. In 1985, the tribe had 123 tribal citizens.

The Confederated Tribes of the Chehalis Reservation is a tribe composed primarily of people of Chehalis descent (Upper and Lower), as well as others such as Quinault. The tribe had 425 enrolled members in the 1980s.

The Quinault Indian Nation is a tribe composed primarily of Quinault, Quileute, Chinook, and Hoh peoples, with Lower Chehalis descendants being a minority population. The tribe had an enrolled population of 2,036 in the 1980s.
