= Cowlitz language =

Salishan language of Southwestern Washington

Cowlitz
- ƛʼpúlmixq
- Native to: United States
- Region: Southwestern Washington
- Ethnicity: Lower Cowlitz people
- Extinct: October 23, 1992, with the death of Emma Northover Mesplie; dormant by 1960s
- Revival: revival efforts underway
- Language family: Salishan: Coast; Tsamosan; Inland; Cowlitz

Language codes
- ISO 639-3: cow
- Glottolog: cowl1242

Cowlitz (Cowlitz: ƛʼpúlmixq), also known as Cowlitz Salish, is a Tsamosan language of the Coast Salish family of Salishan languages. It was spoken by the Lower Cowlitz people of the Cowlitz Indian Tribe and is spoken today by both Lower and Upper Cowlitz people. It went dormant in the 1960s. As of 2022, it is being revitalized by the Cowlitz Tribe in collaboration with the Language Conservancy.

== Dialects ==
Cowlitz had two dialects, with a dialectal opposition between [k] and [x] and [t͡ʃ] and [ʃ]. However, these dialects were poorly documented, due to the extinction of the language.

== Cowlitz people ==
The Cowlitz people were originally two distinct tribes: the Lower Cowlitz and the Upper Cowlitz, sometimes called the Taidnapam. Only the Lower Cowlitz originally spoke Cowlitz Salish. The Upper Cowlitz spoke a Sahaptin language.

== Phonology ==
Consonants
		Bilabial	Alveolar			Palatal	Velar		Uvular		Glottal
		Bilabial	median	sibilant	lateral	Palatal	plain	lab.	plain	lab.	Glottal
Plosive/ Affricate	plain	p	t	ts ⟨c⟩		tʃ ⟨č⟩	k	kʷ	q	qʷ	ʔ
Plosive/ Affricate	ejective	pʼ	tʼ	tsʼ ⟨cʼ⟩	tɬʼ ⟨ƛʼ⟩	tʃʼ ⟨čʼ⟩	kʼ	kʷʼ	qʼ	qʷʼ	ʔ
Fricative				s	ɬ	ʃ ⟨š⟩	x	xʷ	χ ⟨x̣⟩	χʷ ⟨x̣ʷ⟩	h
Sonorant	plain	m	n		l	j ⟨y⟩		w			
Sonorant	glottalized	mˀ ⟨mʼ⟩	nˀ ⟨nʼ⟩		lˀ ⟨lʼ⟩	jˀ ⟨yʼ⟩		wˀ ⟨wʼ⟩			

Vowels
	Front	Central	Back
Close	i		u
Mid	e eː	ə	oː
Open		a aː	

== Orthography ==
Cowlitz alphabet
ʔ	a	b	c	cʼ	č	čʼ	d	e	ə	f	g	h	i	j	k	kʷ	kʼ	kʷʼ	l	lʼ	ɬ	ƛʼ	m	mʼ	n
nʼ	o	o	p	pʼ	q	qʷ	qʼ	qʷʼ	r	s	š	t	tʼ	u	v	w	wʼ	x	xʷ	x̣	x̣ʷ	y	yʼ	z	

== Vocabulary ==
Cowlitz is most similar to Lower Chehalis, another Tsamosan language, although it contains some oddities, such as the word for one, utsus (in contrast to the Lower Chehalis paw).

English	Cowlitz
Lower Cowlitz people	sƛʼpúlmx
one (number)	ʔúcʼs
two	sáliʔ
three	káʔɬiʔ
four	mús
five	čílačš
to sing	sʔílnʼ
moon/sun	ɬukʷáɬ
dog	qáx̣aʔ
water	qálʔ
man	síɬmx
woman	kə́wɬ

== See also ==
- Cowlitz people
- Salishan languages
- Native American Languages
