= Lisa Matthewson =

Canadian linguist

Academic background
- Education: University of British Columbia
- Thesis: Determiner Systems and Quantificational Strategies: Evidence from Salish
- Doctoral advisor: Dale Kinkade

Academic work
- Discipline: Linguistics
- Sub-discipline: Semantics; Pragmatics
- Website: linguistics.ubc.ca/profile/lisa-matthewson/

Lisa Christine Matthewson is Professor of Linguistics in the Department of Linguistics at University of British Columbia with specialties in pragmatics and semantics. She has also done significant work with semantic fieldwork and in the preservation and oral history of First Nations languages, especially St'át'imcets and Gitksan. Matthewson's appointment at UBC was notable because she was the first female full professor in the department's history.

== Biography ==
Matthewson received her BA and MA from Victoria University of Wellington. She received her PhD in linguistics from the University of British Columbia in 1996. In 1998, her PhD thesis, "Determiner Systems and Quantificational Strategies: Evidence from Salish", was awarded the E. W. Beth Dissertation Prize, given to outstanding PhD theses in the fields of logic, language, and information.

Matthewson's research explores how variation in semantics and pragmatics among languages can provide insight into the proposal of a Universal Grammar. Her paper, On the Methodology of Semantic Fieldwork, is one of her most widely cited papers. Matthewson co-edited the 2015 book Methodologies in Semantic Fieldwork from Oxford University Press.

Matthewson also co-developed the Totem Field Storyboards project, which seeks to gather linguistic information from speakers without direct interviews.

== Key publications ==
Matthewson, Lisa 1999. On the Interpretation of Wide-Scope Indefinites. Natural Language Semantics 7:79-134.

Matthewson, Lisa 2001. Quantification and the Nature of Cross-Linguistic Variation.Natural Language Semantics 9:145-189.

Matthewson, Lisa 2004. On the Methodology of Semantic Fieldwork. International Journal of American Linguistics 70:369-415.

Schaeffer, Jeannette and Lisa Matthewson 2005. Grammar and Pragmatics in the Acquisition of Article Systems. Natural Language and Linguistic Theory 23:53-101.

Matthewson, Lisa 2006. Temporal Semantics in a Supposedly Tenseless Language.Linguistics and Philosophy 29:673-713.

Matthewson, Lisa, Hotze Rullmann and Henry Davis 2007. Evidentials as Epistemic Modals: Evidence from St’at’imcets. The Linguistic Variation Yearbook 7.

von Fintel, Kai and Lisa Matthewson 2008. Universals in Semantics. The Linguistic Review 25(1-2):139-201.

Rullmann, Hotze, Lisa Matthewson and Henry Davis 2008. Modals as Distributive Indefinites. Natural Language Semantics 16:317-357.

Bochnak, Ryan and Lisa Matthewson (eds.) 2015. Methodologies in Semantic Fieldwork.Oxford: Oxford University Press.

Burton, Lisa and Strang Burton 2015. Targeted Construction Storyboards in Semantic Fieldwork. In R. Bochnak and L. Matthewson (eds.), Methodologies in Semantic Fieldwork. Oxford: Oxford University Press, 135–156.
