= M. Dale Kinkade =

American linguist (1933–2004)

- Kinkade in 2004
- Born: July 18, 1933; Hartline, Washington, U.S.
- Died: December 19, 2004 (aged 71)

Academic background
- Education: Indiana University

Academic work
- Institutions: Washington State College; University of Kansas; University of British Columbia

M. Dale Kinkade (July 18, 1933 – December 19, 2004) was an American linguist known especially for his work on Salishan languages.

== Biography ==
Born July 18, 1933, in Hartline, Washington, he graduated from Peshastin High School in 1950. He received his B.A. from the University of Washington in 1955 and his M.A. in 1957. He then moved to Indiana University, where he received his Ph.D. in 1963. After serving for three years in the United States Army, he taught at Washington State College from 1961 to 1964, and the University of Kansas from 1964 to 1973 before moving to the University of British Columbia where he remained until his retirement in 1998 as Distinguished Professor of Linguistics.

Kinkade served for many years as a trustee of the Jacobs Fund of the Whatcom Museum Foundation, which supports fieldwork on Pacific Northwest languages and cultures and was one of the founders of the annual International Conference on Salishan and Neighboring Languages in 1966. He continued to work after his retirement; his last major work was his Cowlitz dictionary and grammatical sketch published in 2004.

Kinkade was known for his insightful and in-depth research on all aspects of Salishan languages. Between 1960 and 1976 he conducted extensive fieldwork on several severely endangered languages. His own fieldwork together with his mastery of the literature made him the undisputed dean of Salishan linguistics. His contributions include dictionaries of three Salishan languages: Moses Columbia (1981), Upper Chehalis (1991), and Cowlitz (2004); over one hundred papers; several contributions to the Handbook of North American Indians (Volumes 7, 12, and 17); and several encyclopaedia and other general articles. As befits a specialist in a group of languages renowned for their phonetic difficulty Kinkade had a reputation as a master practical phonetician.

Kinkade had a great, though dry, sense of humor and was generous with his time and extensive knowledge. He had a deep interest in classical music, especially opera, and was a strong supporter of the Seattle Opera. He was also an avid baseball fan and sometimes combined this interest with opera by listening to an opera while watching a baseball game. Although he lived and worked in Canada for more than 30 years he never became a Canadian citizen.

Shortly before his death on December 19, 2004 from a brain tumor he was honored by the presentation of a Festschrift entitled Studies in Salish linguistics in honor of M. Dale Kinkade.

== Bibliography ==
- Donna B. Gerdts & Lisa Matthewson (eds.) (2004) Studies in Salish linguistics in honor of M. Dale Kinkade. Missoula: University of Montana Working Papers in Linguistics 17.
- Davis, Henry, Donna Gerdts, and William Seaburg (2004) Society for the Study of the Indigenous Languages of the Americas. pp. 1–2.
- Kinkade, M. Dale. Dictionary of the Moses-Columbia Language (Nxaʔamxcín). Nespelem, Wash: Colville Confederated Tribes, 1981.
