= Chehalis Village, Washington =

- Former CDP
- Location of Chehalis Village, Washington
- Coordinates: 46°48′28″N 123°10′15″W
- Country: United States
- State: Washington
- County: Grays Harbor

Area
  - Total: 1.0 sq mi (2.6 km^{2})
  - Land: 1.0 sq mi (2.6 km^{2})
  - Water: 0 sq mi (0.0 km^{2})
- Elevation: 105 ft (32 m)

Population (2000)
  - Total: 346
  - Density: 339/sq mi (130.9/km^{2})
- Time zone: UTC-8 (Pacific (PST))
  - Summer (DST): UTC-7 (PDT)
- FIPS code: 53-11568
- GNIS feature ID: 2408015

Chehalis Village is a former census-designated place (CDP) in Grays Harbor County, Washington, United States. The population was 346 at the 2000 census. The area was no longer listed as a CDP for the 2010 census.

== Geography ==
According to the United States Census Bureau, the CDP had a total area of 1.0 square miles (2.6 km^{2}), all of it land.

== Demographics ==
Historical population
Census	Pop.	Note	%±
1990	282		—
2000	346		22.7%

As of the census of 2000, there were 346 people, 81 households, and 69 families residing in the CDP. The population density was 338.9 people per square mile (131.0/km^{2}). There were 92 housing units at an average density of 90.1/sq mi (34.8/km^{2}). The racial makeup of the CDP was 13.01% White, 82.37% Native American, 0.29% from other races, and 4.34% from two or more races. Hispanic or Latino of any race were 5.20% of the population.

There were 81 households, out of which 60.5% had children under the age of 18 living with them, 35.8% were married couples living together, 38.3% had a female householder with no husband present, and 13.6% were non-families. 9.9% of all households were made up of individuals, and 4.9% had someone living alone who was 65 years of age or older. The average household size was 4.27 and the average family size was 4.46.

In the CDP, the population was spread out, with 49.1% under the age of 18, 9.5% from 18 to 24, 24.6% from 25 to 44, 13.6% from 45 to 64, and 3.2% who were 65 years of age or older. The median age was 18 years. For every 100 females, there were 92.2 males. For every 100 females age 18 and over, there were 85.3 males.

The median income for a household in the CDP was $30,357, and the median income for a family was $29,583. Males had a median income of $28,194 versus $20,938 for females. The per capita income for the CDP was $7,538. About 18.8% of families and 21.2% of the population were below the poverty line, including 20.9% of those under age 18 and 43.8% of those age 65 or over.
