= Quinault language =

Dormant Salishan language of Washington State

Quinault
- Kʷínaył
- Native to: United States
- Region: Olympic Peninsula, Washington
- Ethnicity: 1,500 Quinault people (1977)
- Extinct: 1996 half a dozen know some vocabulary (2007)
- Revival: revival efforts underway
- Language family: Salishan: Coast; Tsamosan; Maritime; Quinault

Language codes
- ISO 639-3: qun
- Glottolog: quin1251

Quinault (Kʷínaył) is a member of the Tsamosan (Olympic) branch of the Coast Salish family of Salishan languages. It is extinct, but efforts are being taken to revitalize it.

== Phonology ==
Consonants
		Bilabial	Alveolar			Palatal	Velar		Uvular		Glottal
		Bilabial	median	sibilant	lateral	Palatal	plain	lab.	plain	lab.	Glottal
Plosive/ Affricate	plain	p	t	ts		tʃ	k	kʷ	q	qʷ	ʔ
Plosive/ Affricate	ejective	pʼ	tʼ	tsʼ	tɬʼ	tʃʼ	kʼ	kʷʼ	qʼ	qʷʼ	ʔ
Plosive/ Affricate	voiced					dʒ	ɡ (Note: A voiced fricative sound /ɣ/ may also be heard as a voiced stop [ɡ].)				
Fricative	voiceless			s	ɬ	ʃ	x	xʷ	χ	χʷ	h
Fricative	voiced						ɣ				
Sonorant		m	n		l	j		w			

- Sounds /w, j, l/ can be heard as voiceless [w̥, j̊, l̥] when within voiceless positions.
- /xʷ/ may also be pronounced as [ʍ] in free variation.

Vowels are represented as /i, ɛ, ə, a, ɔ, u/ and /iː, uː, aː/.

Vowels
	Front	Central	Back
Close	i iː		u uː
Mid	ɛ	ə	ɔ
Open		a aː	

An alternative phonology is as follows:

Quinault vowels
	Front	Central	Back
Close	i		u
Near-close	ɪ		
Mid	e	ə	o
Open	a		
