= Lower Chehalis language =

Salishan language of North America

Lower Chehalis
- Łəw̓ál̕məš ɬəw̓ál̓məš
- Native to: United States
- Region: south of Olympic Peninsula, Washington
- Ethnicity: Chehalis people
- Extinct: 1990s
- Language family: Salishan: Coast; Tsamosan; Maritime; Lower Chehalis

Language codes
- ISO 639-3: cea
- Glottolog: lowe1427
- Lower Chehalis is classified as Extinct by the UNESCO Atlas of the World's Languages in Danger.

Lower Chehalis (Łəw̓ál̕məš) is a member of the Tsamosan (or Olympic Peninsula) branch of the Coast Salish family of Salishan languages. In some classifications, Lower Chehalis is placed closer to Quinault than it is to Upper Chehalis. It went extinct in the 1990s.

== Phonology ==
Consonants
		Bilabial	Alveolar			Palatal	Velar		Uvular		Glottal
		Bilabial	median	sibilant	lateral	Palatal	plain	lab.	plain	lab.	Glottal
Plosive/ Affricate	plain	p	t	ts		tʃ	k	kʷ	q	qʷ	ʔ
Plosive/ Affricate	ejective	pʼ	tʼ	tsʼ	tɬʼ	tʃʼ	kʼ	kʷʼ	qʼ	qʷʼ	ʔ
Fricative				s	ɬ	ʃ		xʷ	χ	χʷ	h
Sonorant	plain	m	n		l	j		w			
Sonorant	glottalized	ˀm	ˀn		ˀl	ˀj		ˀw			

Vowels are represented as /i ə u a/ and /iː uː aː/. Allophones are also noted.

Sound	Allophone
/i/	[i], [e], [ɛ]
/a/	[aˤ], [a], [ɐ]
/ə/	[ɨ], [ə], [ʌ], [ɪ], [ʊ]
/u/	[u], [o], [ɔ]
