= Salishan languages =

Indigenous language family of western Canada and the US

Salishan
- Salish
- Geographic distribution: Pacific Northwest and Interior Plateau/Columbia Plateau in Canada and the United States
- Ethnicity: Salish peoples
- Linguistic classification: One of the world's primary language families
- Early form: Proto-Salish
- Subdivisions: Nuxalk; Central (Coast) Salish; Tsamosan †; Tillamook †; Interior Salish

Language codes
- ISO 639-2 / 5: sal
- Glottolog: sali1255
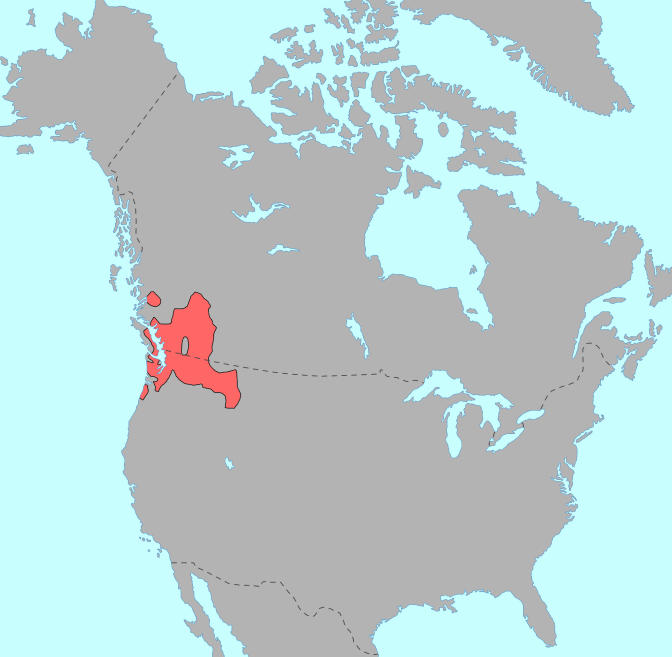
- Pre-contact distribution of Salishan languages (in red)

The Salishan languages (/ˈseɪlɪʃən/ SAY-lish-ən), also known as the Salish languages (/ˈseɪlɪʃ/ SAY-lish), are a family of languages spoken in the Pacific Northwest of North America, including the Canadian province of British Columbia and the U.S. states of Washington, Oregon, Idaho, and Montana. They are characterised by agglutination and ejective consonants.

The Salishan languages are a geographically contiguous block, with the exception of the Nuxalk (Bella Coola), in the Central Coast of British Columbia, and the extinct Tillamook language, to the south on the central coast of Oregon.

The terms Salish and Salishan are used interchangeably by linguists and anthropologists. The name Salish or Selisch is the endonym of the Bitterroot Salish. Linguists later applied the name Salish to related languages in the Pacific Northwest. Many of the peoples do not have self-designations (autonyms) in their languages; they frequently have specific names for local dialects, as the local group was more important culturally than larger tribal relations.

All Salishan languages are considered critically endangered, some extremely so with only three or four speakers left. Those languages considered extinct are often referred to as "dormant languages", in that no speakers exist currently, but still serve as a symbol of ethnic identity to an ethnic group. In the early 21st century, few Salish languages have more than 2,000 speakers. Fluent daily speakers of almost all Salishan languages are mostly more than 60 years old; many Salishan languages have only speakers older than 80.

Writing systems used for Salishan languages vary between communities. Many Indigenous writing systems in the Pacific Northwest are based on Americanist phonetic notation, using additional letters and diacritics to represent the languages' sounds. The SENĆOŦEN alphabet was developed by W̱SÁNEĆ elder Dave Elliott Sr. in 1978 and adopted by the W̱SÁNEĆ School Board in 1984.

== Family division ==
The Salishan language family consists of twenty-three languages. The family is typically organized into five main divisions with variation: Central Salish (Central division, a.k.a. Coast Salish), Tsamosan (a.k.a. Olympic Salish), Interior Salish (Interior division), Tillamook, and Nuxalk. (Note: Also known as Bella Coola) Nuxalk is sometimes classified as part of the Coastal Division of languages. (Note: Nuxalk is classified as a Coast Salish language in Thompson & Kinkade 1990.) Tillamook is also sometimes classified as part of the Coast Division. (Note: Tillamook is classified as a Coast Salish language in Thompson & Kinkade 1990.) It was proposed by Morris Swadesh that the Olympic branch of Coast Salishan languages is a natural subdivision within the family, although linguists today generally accept the Olympic branch as a subgrouping within the Coast Salish division. The Interior Salish languages have a higher degree of closeness to each other than the more distant Coast Salish languages.

=== Language tree ===
The following list includes Salishan languages, dialects, and subdialects. A commonly accepted classification divides the family into five branches: Bella Coola, Central Salish, Tsamosan, Tillamook, and Interior Salish. Linguistic divisions do not always correspond to tribal divisions; for example, Montana Salish, Kalispel, and Spokane are classified as closely related dialects of a single language spoken by different tribes.

Distribution of Salishan languages at the beginning of the 19th century

Languages or dialects with no living native speakers are marked with † at the highest level.

==== Reduced overview ====
- Salishan
  - Nuxalk
    - Nuxalk
  - Central (Coast) Salish
    - Comox
    - Halkomelem
    - Lushootseed † (Note: Currently undergoing revitalization.)
    - Nooksack †
    - Pentlatch †
    - Sechelt
    - Squamish
    - Straits Salish group
      - Klallam †
      - Northern Straits
    - Twana †
  - Tsamosan †
    - Inland division †
      - Cowlitz †
      - Upper Chehalis †
    - Maritime division †
      - Lower Chehalis †
      - Quinault †
  - Tillamook †
    - Tillamook †
  - Interior Salish
    - Northern
      - Shuswap
      - Lillooet
      - Thompson River Salish
    - Southern
      - Coeur d’Alene
      - Columbia-Moses †
      - Colville-Okanagan
      - Montana Salish

==== Detailed overview ====
- Nuxalk (also: Bella Coola, Salmon River)
  - Kimsquit
  - Nuxalk
  - Kwatna
  - Tallheo
- Central Salish (a.k.a. Coast Salish)
  - Comox (Also: Éyɂáɂjuuthem)
    - Island Comox (also: ʔayʔajusəm, Qʼómox̣ʷs, Kʼómoks) †
    - Mainland Comox (also: ʔayajuθəm, Sliammon, Tla A'min)
  - Halkomelem
    - Island (also: Hulʼq̱ʼumiʼnumʼ, Həl̕q̓əmín̓əm̓)
      - Cowichan
      - Snuneymuxw and Snaw-Na-Was
      - Halalt
      - Stz'uminus (Chemainus)
      - Lamalcha
      - Malahat
      - Penelakut
      - Lyackson
      - Lake Cowichan
    - Downriver (also: Hunqʼumʔiʔnumʔ)
      - Musqueam
      - Katzie
      - Kwantlen
      - Snokomish
      - Tsawwassen
      - Kwikwetlem
      - Tsleil-waututh
    - Upriver (also: Upper Sto:lō, Halqʼəméyləm)
      - Sts'Ailes
      - Chilliwack area bands
      - Tait
      - Skway
  - Lushootseed (also: dxʷləšucid, Puget Salish, Skagit-Nisqually) †
    - Northern
      - Skagit (also: sqaǰət)
      - Sauk-Suiattle (also: saʔqʷəbixʷ)
      - Snohomish (also: sduhubš)
    - Southern
      - Duwamish (also: dxʷdəwʔabš)
      - Puyallup (also: spuyaləpabš)
      - Nisqually (also: dxʷsqʷaliʔabš)
      - Suquamish (also: suq̓ʷabš)
  - Nooksack (also: Łə́čələsəm, Łə́čælosəm) †
  - Pentlatch (also: Pənƛ̕áč) †
  - Sechelt (sháshíshalh-em)
  - Squamish (also: Sḵwx̱wú7mesh snichim, Sḵwx̱wú7mesh, Sqwxwu7mish, Sqʷx̣ʷúʔməš)
  - Straits Salish group (also: Straits)
    - Klallam (also: Clallam, nəxʷsƛ̕áy̓emúcən) †
      - Becher Bay
      - Eastern
      - Western
    - Northern Straits (also: Straits)
      - Lummi (also: Xwlemiʼchosen, Xʷləmiʔčósən) †
      - Saanich (also: SENĆOŦEN, Sənčáθən, Sénəčqən)
      - Samish (also: Siʔneməš)
      - Semiahmoo (also: Tah-tu-lo) †
      - T'Sou-ke (also: Sooke, C̓awk) †
      - Songhees (also: Lək̓ʷəŋín̓əŋ) †
  - Twana (also: Skokomish, Sqʷuqʷúʔbəšq, Tuwáduqutšad) †
    - Quilcene
    - Skokomish (also: Sqʷuqʷúʔbəšq)
- Tsamosan (a.k.a. Olympic Salish) †
  - Inland division †
    - Cowlitz (also: ƛʼpúlmixq) †
    - Upper Chehalis (also: Q̉ʷay̓áyiɬq̉) †
      - Oakville Chehalis
      - Satsop
      - Tenino Chehalis
  - Maritime division †
    - Lower Chehalis (also: Łəw̓ál̕məš) †
      - Humptulips
      - Westport-Shoalwater
      - Wynoochee
    - Quinault (also: Kʷínayɬ) †
      - Queets
      - Quinault
- Tillamook (also: Hutyéyu) †
  - Siletz
  - Tillamook
    - Garibaldi-Nestucca
    - Nehalem
- Interior Salish
  - Northern
    - Shuswap (also: Secwepemctsín, səxwəpməxcín)
      - Eastern
        - Kinbasket
        - Shuswap Lake
      - Western
        - Canim Lake
        - Chu Chua
        - Deadman's Creek–Kamloops
        - Fraser River
        - Pavilion-Bonaparte
    - Lillooet (also: Lilloet, St'át'imcets)
      - Lillooet-Fountain
      - Mount Currie–Douglas
    - Thompson River Salish (also: Nlakaʼpamux, Ntlakapmuk, nɬeʔkepmxcín, Thompson River, Thompson Salish, Thompson, known in frontier times as the Hakamaugh, Klackarpun, Couteau or Knife Indians)
      - Lytton
      - Nicola Valley
      - Spuzzum–Boston Bar
      - Thompson Canyon
  - Southern
    - Coeur d’Alene (also: Snchitsuʼumshtsn, snčícuʔumšcn)
    - Columbia-Moses (also: Columbia, Nxaʔamxcín) †
      - Chelan
      - Entiat
      - Columbian
      - Wenatchee (also: Pesquous)
    - Colville-Okanagan (also: Okanagan, Nsilxcín, Nsíylxcən, ta nukunaqínxcən)
      - Northern
        - Quilchena & Spaxomin
        - Sinixt sn-selxcin
        - Penticton
        - Similkameen
        - Vernon
      - Southern
        - Colville-Inchelium
        - Methow
        - San Poil–Nespelem
        - Southern Okanogan
    - Montana Salish (Kalispel–Pend d'Oreille language, Spokane–Kalispel–Bitterroot Salish–Upper Pend d'Oreille)
      - Bitterroot Salish (also: Séliš, Bitterroot, Flathead)
      - Kalispel
        - Chewelah
        - Kalispel (also: Qalispé, Lower Pend d’Oreille, Lower Kalispel)
        - Upper Pend d’Oreille (also: Sɫq̓etk͏ʷmsčin̓t, Čłqetkʷmcin, Qlispé, Upper Kalispel)
      - Spokane (also: Npoqínišcn)

== Genetic relations ==
No proposed genetic relationship between Salishan and another language family is widely accepted.

Edward Sapir proposed grouping the Salishan, Wakashan and Chimakuan languages into a hypothetical Mosan family. David Beck argues that the similarities between these families are better explained by prolonged language contact than by common ancestry.

Salishan languages also contributed words to Chinook Jargon, although most of its early vocabulary came from Lower Chinook.

== Family features ==
- Grammatical reduplication
- Nonconcatenation (infixes, metathesis, glottalization)
- Tenselessness
- Nounlessness (controversial)
- Agglutination
- Polysynthesis

== Phonology ==
- Languages of the Salishan family generally have relatively small vowel inventories and relatively large consonant inventories, lacking phonemic tone.
- All members contrast pulmonic and ejective plosives, while fricatives are tenuis with few exceptions.
- All members contrast velar and uvular consonants; plain uvulars are contrasted with labialized counterparts while labialized velars may not have plain counterparts, the latter becoming palatalized in Coast Salish. This is also observed in many Wakashan languages and can be considered an areal feature.
  - Tillamook is highly unusual in lacking labial phonemes and labialization entirely, including rounded vowels; a phonemic contrast still exists through internal rounding.
- Almost all members lack a pulmonic lateral affricate /t͡ɬ/ despite the presence of its ejective counterpart; while unusual crosslinguistically, this is a striking characteristic of the Salishan family. For e.g. Nuxalk, this analysis is supported by the fact that [t͡ɬ] is in free variation with [tʰɬ] ⟨tlh⟩.
- Most members contrast plain and glottalic sonorants.
- North Straits Salish preserved the uvular nasal from Proto-Salish, while Interior Salish preserved its pharyngeal approximants (and possibly alveolar trills in the southern subgroup).
- Lushootseed underwent a process of denasalization along with many other languages of Puget Sound, developing voiced stops.
- Nuxalk differs from its relatives in allowing for the construction of words, phrases and entire sentences using only obstruent consonants, which is typologically extremely rare: e.g. kʼclhhtscw slhxwtlhhts 'you had seen me go through the passage'.
- A form of vowel harmony based on tongue root position can be observed in Interior Salish; this is an areal feature shared with unrelated languages.

== Syntax ==
The syntax of Salish languages is notable for its word order (verb-initial), its valency-marking, and the use of several forms of negation.

=== Word order ===
Although there is a wide array of Salish languages, they all share some basic traits. All are verb initial languages, with VSO (verb-subject-object) being the most common word order. Some Salishan languages allow for VOS and SVO as well. There is no case marking, but central noun phrases will often be preceded by determiners while non-central NPs will take prepositions. Some Salishan languages are ergative, or split-ergative, and many take unique object agreement forms in passive statements. In the St'át'imcets (Lillooet Salish) language, for example, absolutive relative clauses (including a head, like "the beans", and a restricting clause, like "that she re-fried", which references the head) omit person markers, while ergative relative clauses keep person makers on the subject, and sometimes use the topic morpheme -tali. Thus, St'át'imcets is split-ergative, as it is not ergative all the time. Subject and object pronouns usually take the form of affixes that attach to the verb. All Salish languages are head-marking. Possession is marked on the possessed noun phrase as either a prefix or a suffix, while person is marked on predicates. In Central Salish languages like Tillamook and Shuswap, only one plain NP is permitted aside from the subject.

=== Valency-marking ===
Salishan languages are known for their polysynthetic nature. A verb stem will often have at least one affix, which is typically a suffix. These suffixes perform a variety of functions, such as transitive, causative, reciprocal, reflexive, and applicative. Applicative affixes seem to be present on the verb when the direct object is central to the event being discussed, but is not the theme of the sentence. The direct object may be a recipient, for example. It may also refer to a related noun phrase, like the goal a verb intends to achieve, or the instrument used in carrying out the action of the verb. In the sentence ‘The man used the axe to chop the log with’, the axe is the instrument and is indicated in Salish through an applicative affix on the verb.

Applicative affixes increase the number of affixes a verb can take on, that is, its syntactic valence. They are also known as "transitivizers" because they can change a verb from intransitive to transitive. For example, in the sentence 'I got scared.', 'scared' is intransitive. However, with the addition of an applicative affix, which is syntactically transitive, the verb in Salish becomes transitive and the sentence can come to mean ‘I got scared of you.’. In some Salishan languages, such as Sḵwx̲wú7mesh, the transitive forms of verbs are morphologically distinctive and marked with a suffix, while the intransitive forms are not. In others such as Halkomelem, intransitive forms have a suffix as well. In some Salish languages, transitivizers can be either controlled (the subject conducted the action on purpose) or limited-control (the subject did not intend to conduct the action, or only managed to conduct a difficult action).

These transitivizers can be followed by object suffixes, which come to modern Salishan languages via Proto-Salish. Proto-Salish had two types of object suffixes, neutral (regular transitive) and causative (when a verb causes the object to do something or be in a certain state), that were then divided into first, second, and third persons, and either singular or plural. Tentative reconstructions of these suffixes include the neutral singular *-c (1st person), *-ci (2nd person), and *-∅ (3rd person), the causative singular *-mx (1st), *-mi (2nd), and *-∅ (3rd), the neutral plural *-al or *-muɬ (1st), *-ulm or *-muɬ (2nd), and the causative plural *-muɬ (1st and 2nd). In Salishan languages spoken since Proto-Salish, the forms of those suffixes have been subject to vowel shifts, borrowing pronoun forms from other languages (such as Kutenai), and merging of neutral and causative forms (as in Secwepemc, Nlaka'pamuctsin, Twana, Straits Salishan languages, and Halkomelem).

=== Three patterns of negation ===
Henry Davis identifies three widespread patterns of negation in Salishan languages. In Pattern A, a negative predicate takes a nominalized clause as its complement. In Pattern B, a negative predicate takes a clause marked with conjunctive, or subjunctive, morphology. Pattern C has a single-clause structure, with a negative particle preceding the predicate. Davis also identifies a restricted pattern, B′, attested only in Squamish, which combines features of the other patterns.

== Nounlessness ==
Salishan languages (along with the Wakashan and the extinct Chimakuan languages) exhibit predicate/argument flexibility. All content words are able to occur as the head of the predicate (including words with typically 'noun-like' meanings that refer to entities) or in an argument (including those with 'verb-like' meanings that refer to events). Words with noun-like meanings are automatically equivalent to [be + NOUN] when used predicatively, such as Lushootseed sbiaw which means '(is a) coyote'. Words with more verb-like meanings, when used as arguments, are equivalent to [one that VERBs] or [VERB+er]. For example, Lushootseed ʔux̌ʷ means '(one that) goes'.

The following examples are from Lushootseed.

| Sentence (1a) | ʔux̌ʷ ti sbiaw | | |
| Morphemes | ʔux̌ʷ | ti | sbiaw |
| Gloss | go | SPEC | coyote |
| Kinkade interpretation | goes | that which | is a coyote |
| Syntax | Predicate | Subject | |
| Translation | The/a coyote goes. | | |
| Sentence (1b) | sbiaw ti ʔux̌ʷ | | |
| Morphemes | sbiaw | ti | ʔux̌ʷ |
| Gloss | coyote | SPEC | go |
| Kinkade interpretation | is a coyote | that which | goes |
| Syntax | Predicate | Subject | |
| Translation | The one who goes is a coyote. | | |

An almost identical pair of sentences from St’át’imcets demonstrates that this phenomenon is not restricted to Lushootseed.

| Sentence (2a) | t’ak tink’yápa | | | |
| Morphemes | t’ak | ti- | nk’yap | -a |
| Gloss | go.along | DET- | coyote | -DET |
| Kinkade interpretation | goes along | that which | is a coyote | |
| Syntax | Predicate | Subject | | |
| Translation | The/a coyote goes along. | | | |
| Sentence (2b) | nk’yap tit’áka | | | |
| Morphemes | nk’yap | ti- | t’ak | -a |
| Gloss | coyote | DET- | go.along | -DET |
| Kinkade interpretation | is a coyote | that which | goes along | |
| Syntax | Predicate | Subject | | |
| Translation | The one going along is a coyote. | | | |

This and similar behaviour in other Salish and Wakashan languages has been used as evidence for a complete lack of a lexical distinction between nouns and verbs in these families. This has become controversial in recent years. David Beck of the University of Alberta contends that there is evidence for distinct lexical categories of 'noun' and 'verb' by arguing that, although any distinction is neutralised in predicative positions, words that can be categorised as 'verbs' are marked when used in syntactic argument positions. He argues that Salishan languages are omnipredicative, but only have 'uni-directional flexibility' (not 'bi-directional flexibility'), which makes Salishan languages no different from other omnipredicative languages such as Arabic and Nahuatl, which have a clear lexical noun-verb distinction.

Beck does concede, however, that the Lushootseed argument ti ʔux̌ʷ ('the one who goes', shown in example sentence (1b) above) does represent an example of an unmarked 'verb' used as an argument and that further research may potentially substantiate Dale Kinkade's 1983 position that all Salishan content words are essentially 'verbs' (such as ʔux̌ʷ 'goes' and sbiaw 'is a coyote') and that the use of any content word as an argument involves an underlying relative clause. For example, with the determiner ti translated as 'that which', the arguments ti ʔux̌ʷ and ti sbiaw would be most literally translated as 'that which goes' and 'that which is a coyote' respectively.

== Historical linguistics ==
There are twenty-three languages in the Salishan language family. They occupy the Pacific Northwest, with all but two of them being concentrated together in a single large area. It is clear that these languages are related, but it is difficult to track the development of each because their histories are so interwoven. The different speech communities have interacted a great deal, making it nearly impossible to decipher the influences of varying dialects and languages on one another. However, there are several trends and patterns that can be historically traced to generalize the development of the Salishan languages over the years.

The variation between the Salishan languages seems to depend on two main factors: the distance between speech communities and the geographic barriers between them. The diversity between the languages corresponds directly to the distance between them. Closer proximity often entails more contact between speakers, and more linguistic similarities are the result. Geographic barriers like mountains impede contact, so two communities that are relatively close together may still vary considerably in their language use if there is a mountain separating them.

The rate of change between neighboring Salishan languages often depends on their environments. If for some reason two communities diverge, their adaptation to a new environment can separate them linguistically from each other. The need to create names for tools, animals, and plants creates an array of new vocabulary that divides speech communities. However, these new names may come from borrowing from neighboring languages, in which case two languages or dialects can grow more alike rather than apart. Interactions with outside influences through trade and intermarriage often result in language change as well.

Some cultural elements are more resilient to language change, namely, religion and folklore. Salishan language communities that have demonstrated change in technology and environmental vocabulary have often remained more consistent with their religious terminology. Religion and heavily ingrained cultural traditions are often regarded as sacred, and so are less likely to undergo any sort of change. Indeed, cognate lists between various Salishan languages show more similarities in religious terminology than they do in technology and environment vocabulary. Other categories with noticeable similarities include words for body parts, colors, and numbers. There would be little need to change such vocabulary, so it is more likely to remain the same despite other changes between languages. The Coast Salishan languages are less similar to each other than are the Interior Salishan languages, probably because the Coast communities have more access to outside influences.

Another example of language change in the Salishan language family is word taboo, which is a cultural expression of the belief in the power of words. Among the Coast languages, a person's name becomes a taboo word immediately following their death. This taboo is lifted when the name of the deceased is given to a new member of their lineage. In the meantime, the deceased person's name and words that are phonetically similar to the name are considered taboo and can only be expressed via descriptive phrases. In some cases these taboo words are permanently replaced by their chosen descriptive phrases, resulting in language change.

== In popular culture ==
Stanley Evans has written a series of crime fiction novels that use Salish lore and language.

An episode of Stargate SG-1 ("Spirits", 2x13) features a culture of extraterrestrial humans loosely inspired by Pacific coastal First Nations culture, and who speak a language referred to as "ancient Salish".

== Bibliography ==
- Beck, David. (2000). Grammatical Convergence and the Genesis of Diversity in the Northwest Coast Sprachbund. Anthropological Linguistics 42, 147–213.
- Boas, Franz, et al. (1917). Folk-Tales of Salishan and Sahaptin Tribes. Memoirs of the American Folk-Lore Society, 11. Lancaster, Pa: American Folk-Lore Society.
- Czaykowska-Higgins, Ewa; & Kinkade, M. Dale (Eds.). (1997). Salish Languages and Linguistics: Theoretical and Descriptive Perspectives. Berlin: Mouton de Gruyter. ISBN 3-11-015492-7.
- Davis, Henry. (2005). On the Syntax and Semantics of Negation in Salish. International Journal of American Linguistics 71.1, January 2005.
- Davis, Henry. and Matthewson, Lisa. (2009). Issues in Salish Syntax and Semantics. Language and Linguistics Compass, 3: 1097–1166. Online.
- Elmendorf, William W. (1969). "Geographic Ordering, Subgrouping, and Olympic Salish". International Journal of American Linguistics. 35 (3): 220–225. doi:10.1086/465057. ISSN 0020-7071. JSTOR 1264689.
- Flathead Culture Committee. (1981). Common Names of the Flathead Language. St. Ignatius, Mont: The Committee.
- Jorgensen, Joseph G. (1969). Salish Language and Culture: A Statistical Analysis of Internal Relationships, History, and Evolution. Language Science Monographs. Vol. 3. Bloomington, IN: Indiana University Publications.
- Kiyosawa, Kaoru; Donna B. Gerdts. (2010). Salish Applicatives. Leiden, Netherlands: Koninklijke Brill NV.
- Kroeber, Paul D. (1999). The Salish Language Family: Reconstructing Syntax. Lincoln: University of Nebraska Press in cooperation with the American Indian Studies Research Institute, Indiana University, Bloomington.
- Kuipers, Aert H. (2002). Salish Etymological Dictionary. Missoula, MT: Linguistics Laboratory, University of Montana. ISBN 1-879763-16-8
- Liedtke, Stefan. (1995). Wakashan, Salishan and Penutian and Wider Connections Cognate Sets. Linguistic Data on Diskette Series, no. 09. Munchen: Lincom Europa.
- Pilling, James Constantine. (1893). Bibliography of the Salishan Languages. Washington: G.P.O.
- Pilling, James Constantine (2007). Bibliography of the Salishan Languages. Reprint by Gardners Books. ISBN 978-1-4304-6927-8
- Silver, Shirley; Wick R. Miller. (1997). American Indian languages: Cultural and Social Contexts. Tucson: University of Arizona Press.
- Hamill, Chad (2012). Songs of power and prayer in the Columbia Plateau: the Jesuit, the medicine man, and the Indian hymn singer. Corvallis: Oregon State University Press. ISBN 978-0-87071-675-1. Archived from the original on 2015-09-25. Salishan language hymns.
- Thompson, Laurence C. (1973). The Northwest. In T. A. Sebeok (Ed.), Linguistics in North America (pp. 979–1045). Current Trends in Linguistics (Vol. 10). The Hague: Mouton.
- Thompson, Laurence C. (1979). Salishan and the Northwest. In L. Campbell & M. Mithun (Eds.), The Languages of Native America: Historical and Comparative Assessment (pp. 692–765). Austin: University of Texas Press.
- Thompson, Laurence C.; Kinkade, M. Dale (1990). "Languages". Northwest Coast. Handbook of North American Indians. Vol. 7. Smithsonian Institution. pp. 30–51.
