= Coast Salish languages =

Branch of the Salishan languages of western North America

Coast Salish
- Geographic distribution: Salish Sea (Strait of Georgia (British Columbia, Canada) and Puget Sound (Washington state)
- Linguistic classification: Salishan: Coast Salish
- Subdivisions: Central Salish; Tsamosan †; Tillamook †

Language codes
- Glottolog: None
- Distribution of Coast Salish languages in the early 19th century

The Coast Salish languages, also known as the Central Salish languages, are a branch of the Salishan language family. These languages are spoken by First Nations or Native American peoples inhabiting the Pacific Northwest, in the territory that is now known as the southwest coast of British Columbia around the Strait of Georgia and Washington State around Puget Sound. The term "Coast Salish" also refers to the cultures in British Columbia and Washington who speak one of these languages or dialects.

== Geography ==
The Coast Salish languages are spoken around most of the Georgia and Puget Sound Basins, an area that encompasses the sites of the modern-day cities of Vancouver, British Columbia, Seattle, Washington, and others. Archeological evidence indicates that Coast Salish peoples may have inhabited the area as far back as 9000 BCE. What is now Seattle, for example, has been inhabited since the end of the last glacial period (c. 8,000 BCE—10,000 years ago).

In the past, the Nuxálk language (also known as Bella Coola) of British Columbia's Central Coast has also been considered Coast Salish. This language shares at least one phonological change with Coast Salish (the merger of the Proto-Salish pharyngeal approximants with the uvular fricatives), but it also displays certain similarities to the Interior Salish languages. If it is indeed a member of the Coast Salish branch, it was the first to split off from the rest.

== Classification ==
The Coast Salish languages can be classified in anywhere from one to three branches. The Tsamosan and Tillamook languages are often considered by linguists to be independent branches under the Salishan language family, and not part of the Coast Salish branch.

=== Overview ===
Below is a list of the Coast Salish languages. Languages and dialects with no living native speakers are marked with †.

- Coast Salish
  - Coast (Central) Salish
    - Comox † (Note: Currently undergoing revitalization.)
      - Island Comox (ʔayʔajusəm) †
      - Sliammon (ʔayajuθəm; also known as Mainland Comox) †
    - Pentlatch (Pənƛ’áč) †
    - shíshálh (also known as Sechelt)
    - Squamish (Sḵwx̱wú7mesh sníchim)
    - Halkomelem
      - Upriver Halkomelem (Halq̓eméylem)
      - Downriver Halkomelem (hən̓q̓əmin̓əm̓)
      - Island Halkomelem (Hul̓q̓umín̓um̓)
    - Nooksack (Lhéchelesem) †
    - Northern Straits (also known as North Straits)
      - Saanich (SENĆOŦEN)
      - T'Souke
      - Lekwungen (also known as Songhees)
      - Semiahmoo
      - Lummi (Xwlemi' Chosen)
      - Samish (Xws7ámeshqen)
    - S'Klallam (nəxʷsƛ̕áy̓emúcən; also known as Klallam) †
    - Lushootseed †
      - Northern Lushootseed (dxʷləšucid) †
      - Southern Lushootseed (txʷəlšucid, xʷəlšucid; also known as Twulshootseed or Whulshootseed) †
    - Twana (tuwaduq; also known as Skokomish) †
  - Tsamosan (Note: Sometimes considered an independent branch, not part of the Coast Salish languages) †
    - Quinault (Kʷínaył) †
    - Lower Chehalis (Łəw̓ál̕məš) †
    - Upper Chehalis (Q̉ʷay̓áyiłq̉) †
      - Satsop †
    - Cowlitz (ƛʼpúlmixq) †
  - Tillamook/Oregon Salish †
    - Tillamook (Hutyáyu, Hutyéyu) †
      - Tillamook †
      - Siletz †

== See also ==
- Interior Salish languages
- Tillamook (extinct Salishan language)

== Bibliography ==
- Bates, Dawn, Hess, Thom, and Hilbert, Vi; map by Dassow, Laura, 1994, Lushootseed dictionary, University of Washington Press, Seattle and London, ISBN 978-0-295-97323-4. (alk. paper) Revised and expanded update of Hess, Thom, Dictionary of Puget Salish (University of Washington Press, 1976). Accessed Sep 24, 2009.
- Boyd, Robert (1999). The Coming of the Spirit of Pestilence: Introduced Infectious Diseases and Population Decline Among Northwest Coast Indians. Seattle and Vancouver: University of Washington Press and University of British Columbia Press. ISBN 978-0-295-97837-6. (alk. paper)
- Cole, Douglas and Chaikin, Ira (1990). An iron hand upon the people: the law against the potlatch on the Northwest coast. Vancouver and Seattle: Douglas & McIntyre and University of Washington Press. ISBN 978-0-295-97050-9. (acid-free paper)
- Czaykowska-Higgins, Ewa and M. Dale Kinkade (1998) "Salish languages and linguistics" in ibid. (eds.) Salish Languages and Linguistics: Theoretical and Descriptive Perspectives. New York: Mouton de Gruyter, pp. 1–71. ISBN 978-3-11-015492-4.
- Dailey, Tom (2006-06-14). "Duwamish-Seattle". Coast Salish Villages of Puget Sound.
  Page links to Village Descriptions Duwamish-Seattle section .
  Dailey referenced "Puget Sound Geography" by T. T. Waterman. Washington DC: National Anthropological Archives, mss. [n.d.] [ref. 2];
  Duwamish et al. vs. United States of America, F-275. Washington DC: US Court of Claims, 1927. [ref. 5];
  "Indian Lake Washington" by David Buerge in the Seattle Weekly, 1–7 August 1984 [ref. 8];
  "Seattle Before Seattle" by David Buerge in the Seattle Weekly, 17–23 December 1980. [ref. 9];
  The Puyallup-Nisqually by Marian W. Smith. New York: Columbia University Press, 1940. [ref. 10].
  Recommended start is "Coast Salish Villages of Puget Sound" .
- Kroeber, Paul D. (1999) The Salish Language Family: Reconstructing Syntax. Lincoln: University of Nebraska Press, ISBN 978-0-8032-2740-8.
- Lange, Greg (2003-02-04) [2000-12-08]. "Smallpox Epidemic of 1862 among Northwest Coast and Puget Sound Indians". HistoryLink.org Essay 5171.
  Lange referenced a very extensive list.
  Summary article
  - Lange, Greg (2000-12-08). "Smallpox kills 14,000 Northwest Coast Indians from April to December 1862". HistoryLink.org Essay 3176.
    Lange referenced Lange, "Smallpox Epidemic of 1862 among Northwest Coast and Puget Sound Indians" , HistoryLink.org Online Encyclopedia of Washington State History. Accessed 8 December 2000.
- Miller, Jay (Lenape) (1996). "Seattle (Si'al)". In Hoxie, Frederick E. (ed.). Encyclopedia of North American Indians. Boston: Houghton Mifflin. pp. 574–6. ISBN 978-0-395-66921-1.
- "Native Art of the Northwest Coast: Collection Insight". Seattle Art Museum. Archived from the original on 2006-05-11.
- Suttles, Wayne; Lane, Barbara (1990-08-20). "South Coast Salish". In Sturtevant, William C. (ed.). Handbook of North American Indians. Vol. 7. Northwest coast. Washington: Smithsonian Institution. p. 491. ISBN 0-87474-187-4. (v. 7).
- Talbert, Paul (2006-05-01). "SkEba'kst: The Lake People and Seward Park". The History of Seward Park. SewardPark.org. Archived from the original on 2005-12-14.
- Thompson, Lawrence C; Kinkade, M. Dale (1990-08-20). "Languages". In Sturtevant, William C. (ed.). Handbook of North American Indians. Vol. 7. Northwest coast. Washington: Smithsonian Institution. pp. 30–51. ISBN 0-87474-187-4. (v. 7). Wayne Suttles (ed.)
