= Tsamosan languages =

Branch of the Salishan languages of western North America

Tsamosan
- Olympic Salish, Tsamosan Salish
- Geographic distribution: Washington, United States
- Linguistic classification: Salishan: Tsamosan
- Subdivisions: Quinault; Lower Chehalis; Upper Chehalis; Cowlitz

Language codes
- Glottolog: tsam1241 (Tsamosan)
- Notes: † indicates a language with no native speakers, but may have L2 speakers or function as a heritage language

The Tsamosan languages, also known as the Olympic Salish languages, are a division of the Salishan language family. The family includes four languages: Quinaut, Lower Chehalis, Upper Chehalis, and Cowlitz. These languages are spoken by the Southwestern Coast Salish peoples in Washington state.

Though the language family was historically classified as a subgroup of the Central Salish languages, they are now most commonly classified as a distinct branch of the Salishan family due to distinct phonology, morphology, and syntax.

== Classification ==
The Tsamosan languages were first proposed as a distinct branch within the Salishan language family in 1950 when Morris Swadesh classified them as the Olympic branch of the Coast Salish languages. Swadesh based his classification based on lexicostatistcal calculations.

Isidore Dyen challenged the Tsamosan branch's status as a distinct division within the Coast Salish languages in 1962, but W. W. Elmendorf produced additional evidence in favor of the branch's existence in 1969. The status of Tsamosan within Coast/Central was first challenged by M. Dale Kinkade in 1993, who argued that it should be classified as a distinct division within the broader Salishan language family. This is the most commonly accepted classification today.

Below is a list of the Tsamosan languages and attested dialects as they are commonly accepted today:

Tsamosan

  - Maritime division
    - Quinault
      - Queets
      - Quinault
    - Lower Chehalis
      - Humptulips
      - Wynoochee
      - Westport-Shoalwater
  - Inland division
    - Upper Chehalis
      - Satsop
      - Oakville Chehalis
      - Tenino Chehalis
    - Cowlitz

== History ==
=== Development ===
Lower Chehalis contributed significantly to Chinook Jargon.

=== History of research ===
The first Tsamosan languages recorded by Europeans were Quinault and Lower Chehalis along the coast. Several early word lists were created in Lower Chehalis. The earliest major collection of Tsamosan vocabulary was done by Franz Boas.

The most well known languages modernly are Cowlitz and Upper Chehalis, with less being known about the grammatical structure of the others. Little material at all has ever been collected for Lower Chehalis.

The name "Tsamosan" was favored over "Olympic" beginning in the 1970s, as two languages (Upper Chehalis and Cowlitz) are predominantly located off the Olympic Peninsula. "Tsamosan" was chosen based on the related words for "eight" in the four languages, which are different from the other Salishan languages.

By the 1990s, no Tsamosan language had more than one or two speakers, and collecting new data became extremely difficult.
