= Uvular ejective stop =

Consonantal sound represented by ⟨qʼ⟩ in IPA

qʼ
- IPA number: 111 + 401

Audio sample
- source · help

Encoding
- Entity (decimal): &#113;&#700;
- Unicode (hex): U+0071 U+02BC
- X-SAMPA: q_>
Image

A uvular ejective stop is a type of consonantal sound, used in some spoken languages. The symbol in the International Phonetic Alphabet that represents this sound is ⟨qʼ⟩.

== Features ==
Features of a uvular ejective stop:

- Its manner of articulation is occlusive, which means it is produced by obstructing airflow in the vocal tract. Since the consonant is also oral, with no nasal outlet, it is a plosive.
- Its place of articulation is uvular, which means it is articulated with the back of the tongue (the dorsum) at the uvula.
- It is an oral consonant, which means that air is not allowed to escape through the nose.
- It is a median consonant, which means it is produced by directing the airstream down the midline of the tongue, rather than to the sides.
- The airstream mechanism is ejective (glottalic egressive), which means the air is forced out by pumping the glottis upward.

== Occurrence ==
A single plain uvular ejective is found in almost all Northeast Caucasian languages, all South Caucasian languages, and some Athabaskan languages, as well as Itelmen, Quechua and Aymara.

Most Salishan languages, Tlingit, as well as Adyghe and Kabardian (Northwest Caucasian languages), demonstrate a two-way contrast between labialised and plain uvular ejectives.

The Akhvakh language appears to have a contrast between lax and tense uvular ejectives: [qʼaː] 'soup, broth' (lax) vs. [qʼːama] 'cock's comb' (tense).

Abkhaz contrasts plain, palatalised and labialised uvular ejectives, written ⟨ҟ, ҟь, ҟə⟩, e.g., аҟаԥшь [aqʼapʃ] 'red', -ҵəҟьа [-t͡ɕʷʼqʲʼa] 'really, indeed (a verbal suffix)', Аҟәа [aqʷʼa] 'Sukhum'. As with Georgian, Abkhaz has no non-ejective uvular stops; the historically present uvular aspirates have merged with their corresponding fricatives, although the aspirates are preserved in Abaza.

A plain uvular ejective is one of the most common consonants in Ubykh, due to its presence in the past tense suffix /-qʼɜ/. But in addition to palatalised, labialised and plain uvular ejectives, Ubykh also possesses a pharyngealised version and a concurrently labialised and pharyngealised version, making a total of five: [qʼɜqʼɜ] 'he said it', [mɨqʲʼ] 'small and round', [qʷʼɜ] 'to seize', [qˤʼɜqˤʼ] 'to chew', [qʷˤʼɜ] 'cavern'.

=== Examples ===
Language		Word	IPA	Meaning	Notes
Abaza		къапщы/q̇apśə	[qʼapɕə]	'red'	
Abkhaz		аҟаԥшь/aq̇apš	[aqʼapʃ]	'red'	
Adyghe	Hakuchi	къӏэ/q̇e	[qʼa]	'hand'	Dialectal. Corresponds to [ʔ] in other dialects.
Archi		къам/q̇am	[qʼam]	'forelock'	
Azeri	North dialects	qədim	[qʼæˈd̪i̞m]	'ancient'	
Batsbi		ყარ/q̇ar	[qʼar]	'rain'	
Chechen		къийг/q̇iyg/ڨـییگ	[qʼiːg]	'crow'	
Dargwa	Mehweb	uq’laha	[uq’ˈlaha]	'window'	Contrasts with /q qʷ qʷʼ/
Georgian		ყვავილი/q̇vavili	[ˈqʼvävili]	'flower'	Unlike the velar ejective, it does not contrast with voiced or voiceless uvular stops; the Old Georgian voiceless uvular stop has merged with the voiceless velar fricative in modern Georgian. Some scholars view this Georgian phoneme as being rather an uvular ejective fricative /χʼ/.
Haida		qqayttas	[qʼajtʼas]	'basket'	
Itelmen		ӄ'ил'хч	[qʼilˀxt͡ʃ]	'to depart'	
Klallam		wəq̕ə́q̕	[wəqʼəqʼ]	'frog'	Contrasts with /q qʷ qʷʼ/, e.g., sq̕ʷúŋi(ʔ) [sqʷʼuɴi(ʔ)] 'head'.
Kutenai		ʔaq̓am	[ʔaq’am]	'St. Mary’s or deep dense woods'	
Laz		მყოროფონი/mqoroponi	[mqʼɔrɔˈpʰɔni]	'loving'	
Lezgian		кьакьан	[qʼaqʼan]	'tall', 'high'	Contrasts with /q qʰ qʷʰ qʷ qʷʼ/, e.g., кьвех [qʷʼeχ] 'groin'
Lushootseed		q̓il̕bid	[qʼil̰bid]	'canoe'	
Mingrelian		ორტყაფუ/orṭq̇apu	[ɔrtʼqʼapʰu]	'belt'	
North Straits Salish	Saanich	KEYOṮEN	[qʼəjat͡ɬʼənˀ]	'slug, snail'	Contrasts with /q qʷ qʷʼ/, e.g., S₭EḰĆES [sqʷʼəqʷt͡ʃəs] 'red huckleberry'.
Nuxalk		qʼs	[qʼs]	'tight'	Contrasts with /q qʷ qʷʼ/
Quechua		q'illu	[qʼɛʎʊ]	'yellow'	
Svan		ჭყინტ/č̣q̇inṭ	[t͡ʃʼqʼintʼ]	'boy'	
Tahltan			[qʼaχaːdiː]	'door'	
Tlingit		k̲ʼateil	[qʼʌtʰeːɬ]	‘pitcher’	

== See also ==
- List of phonetics topics

Place →	Labial					Coronal										Dorsal					Laryngeal			
Manner ↓	Bilabial		Labiodental		Linguolabial		Dental		Alveolar		Postalveolar		Retroflex		(Alveolo-)palatal		Velar		Uvular		Pharyngeal/epiglottal		Glottal	
Nasal	m̥	m	ɱ̊	ɱ		n̼	n̪̊	n̪	n̥	n	n̠̊	n̠	ɳ̊	ɳ	ɲ̊	ɲ	ŋ̊	ŋ	ɴ̥	ɴ				
Plosive	p	b	p̪	b̪	t̼	d̼	t̪	d̪	t	d			ʈ	ɖ	c	ɟ	k	ɡ	q	ɢ	ʡ		ʔ	
Sibilant affricate							t̪s̪	d̪z̪	ts	dz	t̠ʃ	d̠ʒ	tʂ	dʐ	tɕ	dʑ								
Non-sibilant affricate	pɸ	bβ	p̪f	b̪v			t̪θ	d̪ð	tɹ̝̊	dɹ̝	t̠ɹ̠̊˔	d̠ɹ̠˔			cç	ɟʝ	kx	ɡɣ	qχ	ɢʁ	ʡʜ	ʡʢ	ʔh	
Sibilant fricative							s̪	z̪	s	z	ʃ	ʒ	ʂ	ʐ	ɕ	ʑ								
Non-sibilant fricative	ɸ	β	f	v	θ̼	ð̼	θ	ð	θ̠	ð̠	ɹ̠̊˔	ɹ̠˔	ɻ̊˔	ɻ˔	ç	ʝ	x	ɣ	χ	ʁ	ħ	ʕ	h	ɦ
Approximant		β̞		ʋ				ð̞		ɹ		ɹ̠		ɻ		j		ɰ						˷
Tap/flap		ⱱ̟		ⱱ					ɾ̥	ɾ			ɽ̊	ɽ						ɢ̆		ʡ̆		
Trill	ʙ̥	ʙ							r̥	r		r̠	ɽ̊r̥	ɽr					ʀ̥	ʀ	ʜ	ʢ		
Lateral affricate									tɬ	dɮ			tꞎ	d𝼅	c𝼆	ɟʎ̝	k𝼄	ɡʟ̝						
Lateral fricative							ɬ̪		ɬ	ɮ			ꞎ	𝼅	𝼆	ʎ̝	𝼄	ʟ̝						
Lateral approximant								l̪	l̥	l		l̠	ɭ̊	ɭ	ʎ̥	ʎ	ʟ̥	ʟ		ʟ̠				
Lateral tap/flap									ɺ̥	ɺ			𝼈̊	𝼈		ʎ̆		ʟ̆						

		BL	LD	D	A	PA	RF	P	V	U
Implosive	Voiced	ɓ			ɗ		ᶑ	ʄ	ɠ	ʛ
Implosive	Voiceless	ɓ̥			ɗ̥		ᶑ̊	ʄ̊	ɠ̊	ʛ̥
Ejective	Stop	pʼ			tʼ		ʈʼ	cʼ	kʼ	qʼ
Ejective	Affricate		p̪fʼ	tθʼ	tsʼ	tʃʼ	tʂʼ	tɕʼ	kxʼ	qχʼ
Ejective	Fricative	ɸʼ	fʼ	θʼ	sʼ	ʃʼ	ʂʼ	ɕʼ	xʼ	χʼ
Ejective	Lateral affricate				tɬʼ			c𝼆ʼ	k𝼄ʼ	q𝼄ʼ
Ejective	Lateral fricative				ɬʼ					
Click (top: velar; bottom: uvular)	Tenuis	kʘ qʘ		kǀ qǀ	kǃ qǃ		k𝼊 q𝼊	kǂ qǂ		
Click (top: velar; bottom: uvular)	Voiced	ɡʘ ɢʘ		ɡǀ ɢǀ	ɡǃ ɢǃ		ɡ𝼊 ɢ𝼊	ɡǂ ɢǂ		
Click (top: velar; bottom: uvular)	Nasal	ŋʘ ɴʘ		ŋǀ ɴǀ	ŋǃ ɴǃ		ŋ𝼊 ɴ𝼊	ŋǂ ɴǂ	ʞ	
Click (top: velar; bottom: uvular)	Tenuis lateral				kǁ qǁ					
Click (top: velar; bottom: uvular)	Voiced lateral				ɡǁ ɢǁ					
Click (top: velar; bottom: uvular)	Nasal lateral				ŋǁ ɴǁ					
