= Hogans Corner, Washington =

- Census-designated place
- Location of Hogans Corner, Washington
- Coordinates: 47°02′30″N 124°09′32″W
- Country: United States
- State: Washington
- County: Grays Harbor

Area
  - Total: 0.32 sq mi (0.83 km^{2})
  - Land: 0.31 sq mi (0.80 km^{2})
  - Water: 0.015 sq mi (0.04 km^{2})
- Elevation: 39 ft (12 m)

Population (2020)
  - Total: 86
  - Density: 280/sq mi (110/km^{2})
- Time zone: UTC-8 (Pacific (PST))
  - Summer (DST): UTC-7 (PDT)
- FIPS code: 53-31540
- GNIS feature ID: 2584983

Hogans Corner is a census-designated place (CDP) in Grays Harbor County, Washington, United States. The population was 86 at the 2020 census. Prior to 2010 it was part of the combined Oyehut-Hogan's Corner CDP.

== Geography ==
Hogans Corner is located in western Grays Harbor County around the intersection of Washington State Routes 109 and 115. SR 109 leads east 16 miles (26 km) to Hoquiam and north along the Pacific coast to Ocean City and Copalis Beach. SR 115 leads south 2 miles (3 km) to Oyehut and Ocean Shores.

According to the United States Census Bureau, the Hogans Corner CDP has a total area of 0.32 square miles (0.83 km^{2}), of which 0.31 square miles (0.80 km^{2}) are land and 0.02 square miles (0.04 km^{2}), or 4.21%, are water.

== Demographics ==
Historical population
Census	Pop.	Note	%±
2010	85		—
2020	86		1.2%
U.S. Decennial Census; 2000 2010

Hogan's Corner was first listed as a census designated place in the 2010 U.S. census formed from part of deleted Oyehut-Hogans Corner CDP and additional area.

=== Racial and ethnic composition ===
Hogans Corner CDP, Washington – Racial and ethnic composition Note: the US Census treats Hispanic/Latino as an ethnic category. This table excludes Latinos from the racial categories and assigns them to a separate category. Hispanics/Latinos may be of any race.
Race / Ethnicity (NH = Non-Hispanic)	Pop 2010	Pop 2020	% 2010	% 2020
White alone (NH)	73	65	85.88%	75.58%
Black or African American alone (NH)	0	0	0.00%	0.00%
Native American or Alaska Native alone (NH)	3	4	3.53%	4.65%
Asian alone (NH)	0	0	0.00%	0.00%
Native Hawaiian or Pacific Islander alone (NH)	0	1	0.00%	1.16%
Other race alone (NH)	3	0	3.53%	0.00%
Mixed race or Multiracial (NH)	3	6	3.53%	6.98%
Hispanic or Latino (any race)	3	10	3.53%	11.63%
Total	85	86	100.00%	100.00%

== Education ==
The community is served by the North Beach School District.
