= Washington State Route 109 =

State highway in Grays Harbor County, Washington, US

State Route 109
- SR 109 highlighted in red

Route information
- Auxiliary route of US 101
- Maintained by WSDOT
- Length: 40.50 mi (65.18 km)
- Existed: 1964–present
- Tourist routes: Hidden Coast Scenic Byway

Major junctions
- South end: US 101 in Hoquiam
- SR 115 near Ocean Shores
- North end: Quinault River Bridge in Taholah

Location
- Country: United States
- State: Washington
- Counties: Grays Harbor

Highway system
- State highways in Washington; Interstate; US; State; Scenic; Pre-1964; 1964 renumbering; Former
← SR 108	→ SR 110

State Route 109 (SR 109) is a Washington state highway in Grays Harbor County. Beginning at its terminus at U.S. Route 101 (US 101) in Hoquiam, the highway travels west to intersect SR 115 near Ocean Shores and then turns north to continue along the Pacific coastline, terminating at the Quinault River Bridge in Taholah, located in the Quinault Indian Reservation.SR 109 was first established as Secondary State Highway 9C (SSH 9C) in 1937, which was on a more northern alignment until 1947, when it was switched to a Hoquiam to Quinault Indian Reservation route. In 1964, SSH 9C was renumbered to SR 109 and in 1983, a spur route of SR 109 that bypasses Hoquiam was added. In 1985, the Washington State Legislature decided to extend the roadway north to end at US 101 south of Queets through tribal lands, although this segment has yet to be built.

== Route description ==
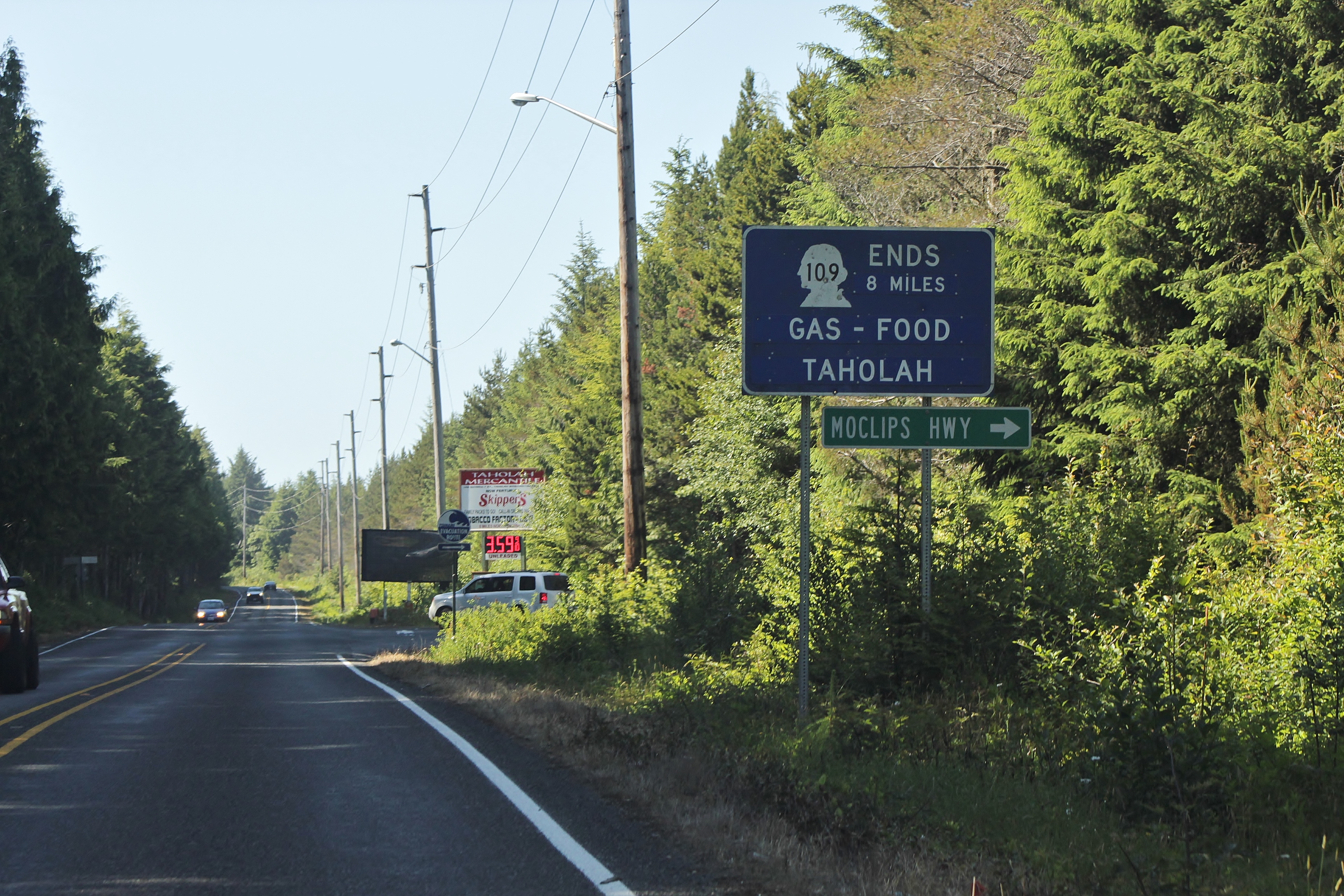
SR 109 at the Moclips Highway

SR 109 begins in downtown Hoquiam as a set of one-way streets that intersect US 101 on the west bank of the Hoquiam River. The highway's northbound lanes travel west along Emerson Avenue from US 101 at Lincoln Street to Simpson Avenue, where the southbound lanes split to intersect the southbound lanes of US 101 at 5th Street. Both directions of SR 109 continue west on Emerson Avenue through a residential area of Hoquiam, passing several schools and parks while following a short branch of the Puget Sound and Pacific Railroad. The railroad ends at the edge of Bowerman Basin, where SR 109 intersects a spur route that serves as a northern bypass of Hoquiam. The highway continues west along Bowerman Basin and passes through the Grays Harbor National Wildlife Refuge, a protected habitat for migrating |shorebirds across from Bowerman Airport.

The highway leaves Hoquiam's city limits and travels along Grays Harbor, turning northwest to climb part of Brackenridge Bluff near Grays Harbor City. SR 109 runs inland through a forested area on the bluff and turns north to cross Grass Creek and follow the shore around the northeast side of Grays Harbor. After crossing the Humptulips River, the highway turns west and passes several cranberry bogs along the north side of Grays Harbor. SR 109 then reaches a junction with SR 115, which provides access to the city of Ocean Shores and Ocean City State Park. The highway turns north to follow the Pacific Coast, passing through the residential area of Ocean City, where it swerves a block east.

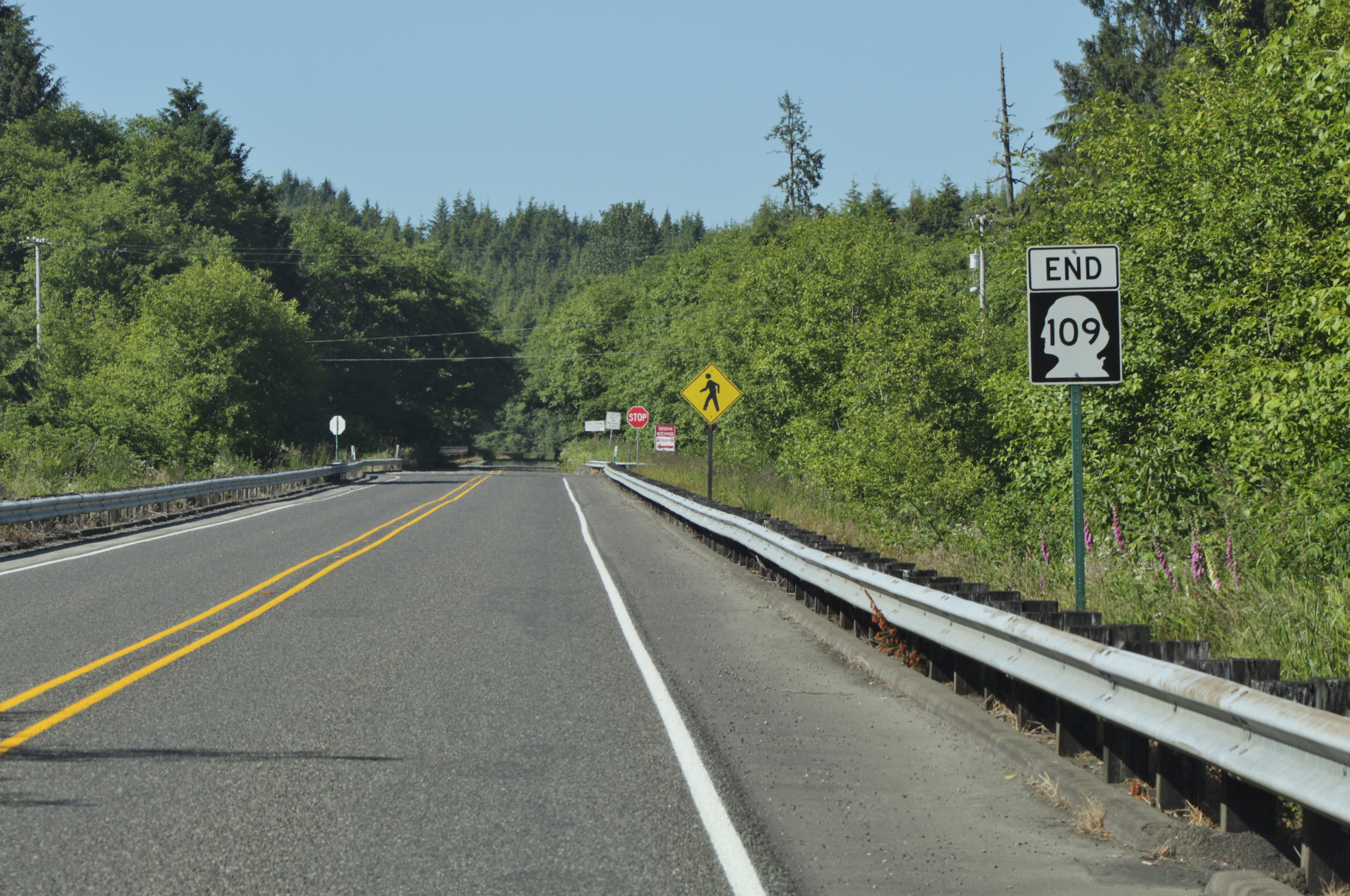
SR 109 at its northern terminus in Taholah

SR 109 continues north along the Pacific Coast, which has several public access points for beaches and state parks, and passes several private resorts and campgrounds. At Copalis Beach, the highway briefly turns east to serve a community center and crosses over the Copalis River. SR 109 then travels through Griffiths-Priday State Park and ascends the ocean-facing bluffs, weaving between small canyons and ravines along the coast, which forms part of the Olympic Coast National Marine Sanctuary. The highway passes through the community of Seabrook, a modern planned development near Roosevelt Beach laid out with New Urbanist principles and inspired by New England's coastal towns. SR 109 then passes through the communities of Pacific Beach and Moclips, serving motels and resorts along the beaches, before entering the Quinault Indian Reservation on the north side of the Moclips River. The highway descends onto the beach and continues northwest along Grenville Bay on the Pacific Coast, passing through a less-populated forested area. SR 109 then enters Taholah, the administrative center of the Quinault Indian Nation, and terminates at the south end of a bridge crossing the Quinault River.

The highway is designated as the Hidden Coast Scenic Byway, a state scenic byway that forms part of the Pacific Coast Scenic Byway system. SR 109 is maintained by the Washington State Department of Transportation (WSDOT), which conducts an annual survey on state highways to measure traffic volume in terms of annual average daily traffic. Average traffic volumes on the highway in 2016 ranged from a minimum of 1,200 vehicles in Taholah to a maximum of 9,600 vehicles in downtown Hoquiam. SR 109 functions as the main access to the Quinault Indian Reservation and Ocean Shores as well as a major tsunami evacuation route. The highway has higher use by vehicles and bicyclists during the summer months.

== History ==
The first land routes along the north coast of Grays Harbor County (originally named Chehalis County) were indigenous trails, followed by the Northern Pacific Railway, which constructed a railroad connecting Hoquiam to Moclips that opened in July 1906. The railroad spurred the development of hotels and tourist facilities in Moclips alongside expanded lumber and seafood harvesting. A road for automobiles was later constructed to connect Hoquiam to Moclips and Taholah via an inland route with connections to Copalis Beach.

The primary and secondary highways were created in 1937 and one of the secondary highways, Secondary State Highway 9C (SSH 9C), would later become SR 109. SSH 9C was also established in 1937, but extended from Primary State Highway 9 (PSH 9), co-signed as U.S. Route 101 (US 101), north of Hoquiam and then traveled west to Pacific Beach, south to Copalis Beach and east to end at itself. In 1947, the highway was moved to a route that ran from PSH 9 / US 101 in Hoquiam, west to Ocean City and north to the southern border of Quinault Indian Reservation north of Moclips. SSH 9C was renumbered to SR 109 during the 1964 highway renumbering; the last time the railroad was shown on maps was in 1968. A bypass of Downtown Hoquiam was built and signed as a spur route of SR 109 in 1983.

An extension of the highway, connecting Taholah to US 101 near Queets along the Pacific Coast, has been proposed since the mid-20th century. Construction began on a $6 million segment of the highway extension in the 1960s, but was halted due to access issues. The Quinault Nation also opposed its construction due to potential disruption to their lifestyle, but later relented and signed a memorandum of understanding with the state government in October 1984. SR 109 was extended by the Washington State Legislature to US 101 south of Queets in 1985, but as of 2009, the highway ends at Taholah. The proposed roadway would be maintained by the Washington State Department of Transportation (WSDOT) and partially built as a limited-access road. The remaining right-of-way would be acquired by WSDOT and the highway could be built with federal funds. The Moclips River Bridge, located in Moclips, is being replaced because of sediment accumulation. Construction was set to start in 2010, but the work was suspended due to budgetary reasons.

== Spur route ==
State Route 109 Spur
- Location: Hoquiam
- Existed: 1983–present

State Route 109 Spur (SR 109 Spur) is a spur route of SR 109 located in Hoquiam and 1.82 miles (2.93 km) in length. The highway bypasses Downtown Hoquiam and runs from SR 109 to U.S. Route 101 (US 101). The spur route was added in 1983 by the Washington State Legislature to serve truck traffic. It traverses Lonngren Pass, a 47-foot (14 m) divide that is named for a local resident. The busiest segment of SR 109 Spur in 2016 was the SR 109 intersection with a daily average of 380 motorists.

== Major intersections ==
The entire route is in Grays Harbor County.

Location	mi	km	Destinations	Notes
Hoquiam	0.00	0.00	US 101 (Olympic Highway) – Aberdeen, Forks, Port Angeles	
Hoquiam	1.79	2.88	SR 109 Spur east to US 101 north – Forks, Port Angeles	
	16.11	25.93	SR 115 south – Ocean Shores, Oyehut	
Taholah	40.50	65.18	Quinault River Bridge	
1.000 mi = 1.609 km; 1.000 km = 0.621 mi

=== Spur intersections ===
The entire route is in Hoquiam, Grays Harbor County.

mi	km	Destinations	Notes
0.00	0.00	SR 109 – Hoquiam, Aberdeen, Ocean Shores, Taholah	
1.82	2.93	US 101 (Olympic Highway) – Forks, Port Angeles, Hoquiam, Aberdeen	
1.000 mi = 1.609 km; 1.000 km = 0.621 mi
