= Seabrook, Washington =

Unincorporated community in Washington state, US

- Unincorporated community
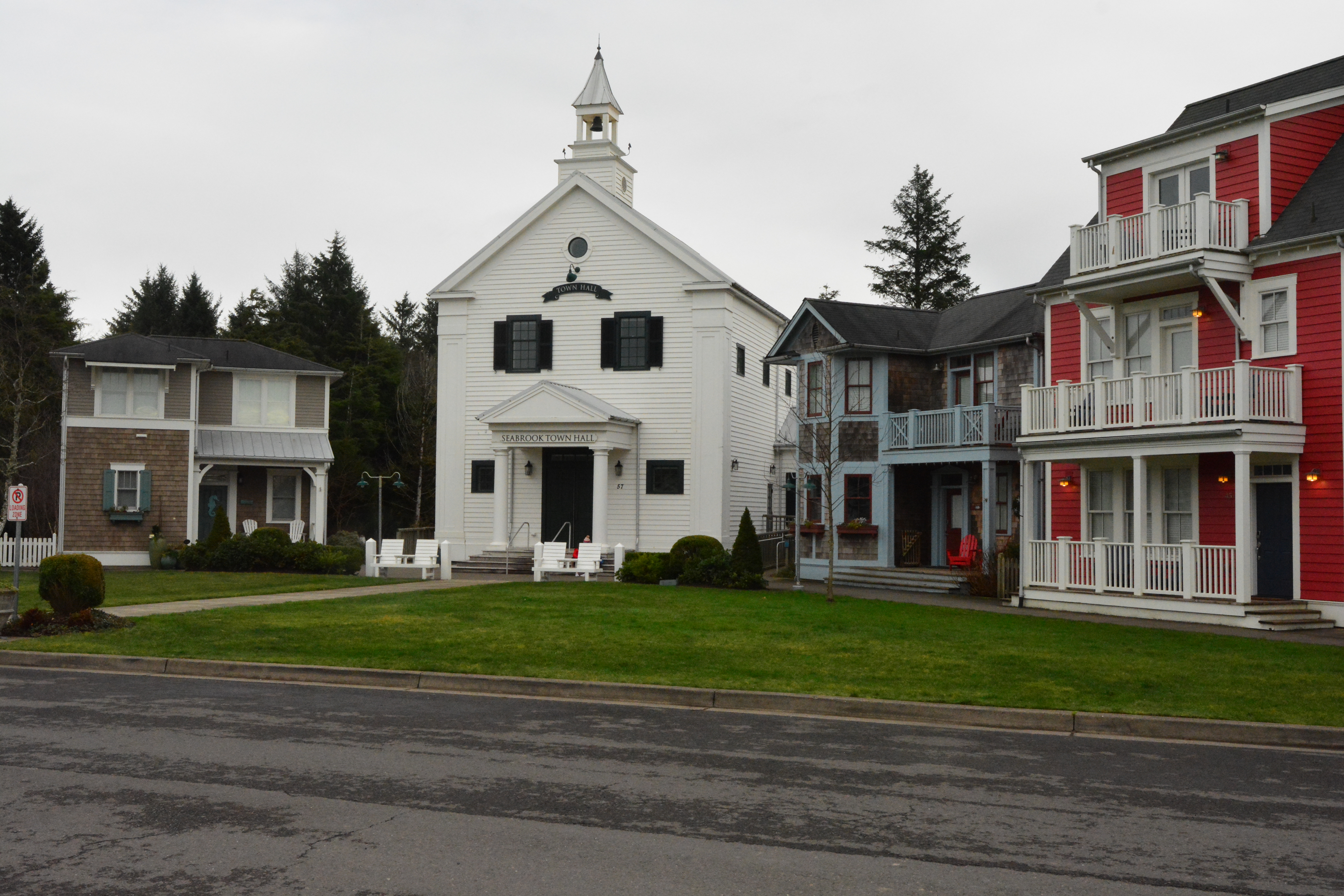
- Homes in Seabrook

- Location within Washington (state) Location within the United States
- Coordinates: 47°12′32″N 124°12′1″W
- Country: United States
- State: Washington
- County: Grays Harbor
- Founded: 2004
- Founder: Casey and Laura Roloff
- Time zone: UTC-8 (Pacific (PST))
  - Summer (DST): UTC-7 (PDT)
- ZIP Code: 98571
- Area code(s): 360, 564
- Website: seabrookwa.com

Seabrook is an unincorporated planned community in Grays Harbor County, Washington, United States, located on the Pacific coast along State Route 109 about one mile south of Pacific Beach and 17 miles north of Ocean Shores. Founded in 2004 by developers Casey and Laura Roloff, Seabrook was designed according to the principles of New Urbanism, with compact walkable neighborhoods organized around a mixed-use town center.

By 2025 the community included approximately 600 homes, the majority of which serve as vacation rentals, along with shops, restaurants, and a grocery store. In 2026, the Congress for the New Urbanism awarded Seabrook the Grand Prize in its annual Charter Awards.

== History ==
Casey and Laura Roloff began their careers building custom homes in Lincoln City, Oregon, and developed two small New Urbanist communities on the Oregon coast, Bella Beach and Olivia Beach, drawing on the model of Seaside, Florida. Seeking land for a larger project, they purchased approximately 250 acres of logged timberland along State Route 109 in Grays Harbor County, a region whose economy had declined for decades with the contraction of the logging and fishing industries.

Construction began in 2004, and the Roloffs moved into the community's first completed house in 2005. The project lost $2.1 million on its first 17 houses due to contractor problems and cost miscalculations before the developers reorganized construction. By 2008 about 100 houses had been built, with 350 more planned; The New York Times reported local tension over the development's upscale market and its effect on water and sewer systems, alongside praise from officials and residents for construction jobs and increased tourism.

The community grew substantially in the following decade. Developer Ron Sher, founder of Third Place Books, became a business partner in 2018. A two-story grocery store opened in 2023, completing the retail block of the town center and giving the surrounding North Beach area its first full grocery north of Ocean Shores. In 2023, Grays Harbor County approved two development agreements covering 365 acres adjacent to the existing town, permitting up to 1,100 additional lots.

== Geography ==
Seabrook occupies a forested bluff above the Pacific Ocean, with most of the community sited across State Route 109 from the shoreline. The developed area spans three promontories totaling 588 acres, of which nearly half is preserved as forest, wetland, and stream corridors. The adjacent shoreline lies within Mocrocks Beach, one of five razor clam management zones designated by the Washington Department of Fish and Wildlife, which extends from the Copalis River to the southern boundary of the Quinault Reservation.

== Governance ==
As an unincorporated community, Seabrook has no municipal government and falls under Grays Harbor County zoning and development regulations. The Seabrook Land Company, owned by the Roloffs, establishes building guidelines, and the community operates its own short-term rental program.

== Economy and development ==
Seabrook had sold more than $700 million in real estate by 2025. About 15 percent of its roughly 600 homes are occupied full-time, primarily by retirees; half serve as vacation rentals and roughly 200 as second homes. In October 2023, the community received county, state, and federal environmental approvals for an expansion including more than 1,300 homes, two retail villages, a spa, a luxury hotel, a medical center, and a community center, projected to create $1.5 billion in real estate value. Longer-term plans announced by the developer include a school and an 80-acre regenerative farm.

== Surrounding region ==
In 2024, Grays Harbor County approved a development agreement with Placemaker Homes LLC, a company led by Casey Roloff, to build 158 units of housing on 17 acres in neighboring Pacific Beach, with county exemptions from standard speed, parking, and short-term rental permitting rules.

The Seabrook Community Foundation, a nonprofit established by the town's founders, reported $3 million in assets in 2023 federal tax filings and funds schools and support services in the region, with board participation from members of the Quinault Indian Nation. In 2007, the developers donated two lots to the Museum of the North Beach for the relocation of the historic Dorothy Anderson Cabin. The Roloffs helped bring a tuition-free Bezos Academy preschool to Pacific Beach in 2021, which closed in 2025, and the foundation has supported the North Beach School District's effort to relocate its elementary school out of a tsunami inundation zone.

Seabrook has drawn criticism as an enclave for affluent visitors in one of Washington's poorer counties, with detractors comparing its planned aesthetic to The Stepford Wives; residents of nearby Moclips have attributed rising property taxes to the development.

== Recognition ==
In 2026, the Congress for the New Urbanism awarded its Charter Award Grand Prize in the Neighborhood, District, and Corridor category to the Seabrook Land Company and planning firm Qamar & Associates.
