= Moclips Highway =

Highway in Washington, US

The Moclips Highway, also designated as BIA Road 26, is a rural east–west highway in the U.S. state of Washington. It travels about 22 miles (35 km) from a junction with State Route 109 near Moclips on the Pacific Ocean, through the Quinault Indian Reservation, to U.S. Route 101 near Lake Quinault.

The Moclips Highway can be combined with Washington State Route 109 and Highway 101 for a scenic tour of the Olympic Peninsula.

The most direct route between Taholah and Queets, 15 miles (24 km) apart on the Quinault Reservation as the crow flies, is via the Moclips Highway and US 101 a total of 75 miles (121 km), which makes Queets disadvantaged for employment and development, as well as tribal activities and services provided at the tribal center in Taholah.

The Quinault National Fish Hatchery is a fish hatchery on the Quinault Reservation, operated by the United States Fish and Wildlife Service as part of the National Fish Hatchery System. It is on the Moclips Highway, about 5 miles (8.0 km) southwest of its intersection with US 101 (47.359°N 123.991°W).
