= KXPB-LP =

- Pacific Beach, Washington; United States
- Frequency: 89.9MHz
- Branding: Your Host on the Coast

Programming
- Format: Variety

Ownership
- Owner: Pacific Beach Food Bank

Technical information
- Licensing authority: FCC
- Facility ID: 132687
- Class: L1
- ERP: 17 watts
- HAAT: 71.0 meters (232.9 ft)
- Transmitter coordinates: 47°13′7.00″N 124°12′13.00″W

Links
- Public license information: LMS
- Website: kxpbradio.com

KXPB-LP (89.9 FM, "Your host on the Coast") is a radio station broadcasting a variety music format. Licensed to Pacific Beach, Washington, United States, the station is currently owned by the Pacific Beach Food Bank. It serves Pacific Beach and Moclips, Washington.

== See also ==
- List of community radio stations in the United States
