= Washington State Route 115 =

State highway in Grays Harbor County, Washington, US

State Route 115
- SR 115 highlighted in red

Route information
- Auxiliary route of US 101
- Maintained by WSDOT
- Length: 2.28 mi (3.67 km)
- Existed: 1973–present

Major junctions
- South end: Point Brown Avenue in Ocean Shores
- North end: SR 109 in Oyehut-Hogan's Corner

Location
- Country: United States
- State: Washington
- Counties: Grays Harbor

Highway system
- State highways in Washington; Interstate; US; State; Scenic; Pre-1964; 1964 renumbering; Former
← SR 113	→ SR 116

State Route 115 (SR 115) is a 2.28-mile-long (3.67 km) state highway in the U.S. state of Washington serving the city of Ocean Shores in Grays Harbor County. The highway begins at Point Brown Avenue in Ocean Shores and travels east across the peninsula before turning north and ending at SR 109 south of Ocean City at Oyehut-Hogan's Corner. SR 115 was established in 1973 to serve Ocean Shores and follows a road built in the 1950s.

== Route description ==
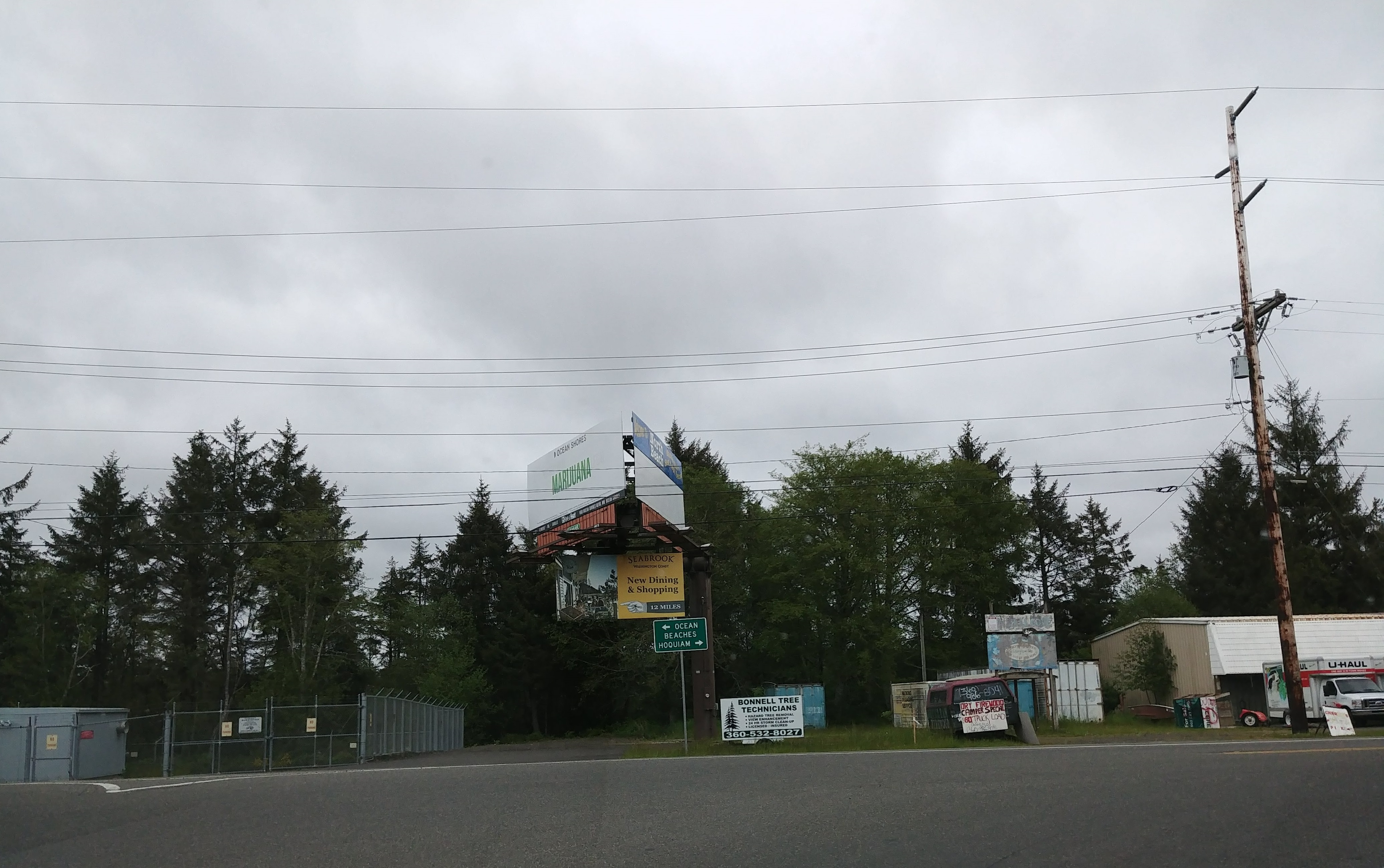
SR 115 at Oyehut

SR 115 begins as Damon Road at an intersection with Point Brown Avenue north of Ocean Shores in Grays Harbor County, located on the shores of the Pacific Ocean. The highway travels east and passes North Beach High School before turning north, following the North Bay of Grays Harbor towards Ocean City State Park. SR 115 continues north into woodlands, passing several unnamed lakes, to Oyehut-Hogan's Corner, where the highway ends at an intersection with SR 109 west of Hogan's Corner Airport.

Every year, the Washington State Department of Transportation (WSDOT) conducts a series of surveys on its highways in the state to measure traffic volume. This is expressed in terms of annual average daily traffic (AADT), which is a measure of traffic volume for any average day of the year. In 2011, WSDOT calculated that between 6,600 and 7,100 vehicles per day used the highway.

== History ==
SR 115 was established in 1973 on a highway that was built and paved in the 1950s to connect Ocean Shores to Secondary State Highway 9C (SSH 9C), later SR 109. The highway was added to the state system on the recommendation of the state legislature's transportation committee, noting that it served as a major recreational route for travelers outside the local area. No major revisions to the route of the highway have occurred since 1973.

== Major intersections ==
The entire highway is in Grays Harbor County.

Location	mi	km	Destinations	Notes
Ocean Shores	0.00	0.00	Point Brown Avenue	Southern terminus, continues as Damon Road
	2.28	3.67	SR 109 – Ocean Beaches, Hoquiam	Northern terminus
1.000 mi = 1.609 km; 1.000 km = 0.621 mi
