= Ocean City, Washington =

- Census-designated place
- Location of Ocean City, Washington
- Coordinates: 47°04′35″N 124°09′43″W
- Country: United States
- State: Washington
- County: Grays Harbor

Area
  - Total: 3.41 sq mi (8.82 km^{2})
  - Land: 3.34 sq mi (8.64 km^{2})
  - Water: 0.066 sq mi (0.17 km^{2})
- Elevation: 39 ft (12 m)

Population (2020)
  - Total: 232
  - Density: 69.5/sq mi (26.9/km^{2})
- Time zone: UTC-8 (Pacific (PST))
  - Summer (DST): UTC-7 (PDT)
- ZIP Code: 98569
- Area code(s): 360, 564
- FIPS code: 53-50500
- GNIS feature ID: 2408972

Ocean City is a census-designated place (CDP) in Grays Harbor County, Washington, United States. The population was 232 at the 2020 census, up from 200 at the 2010 census.

== Geography ==
Ocean City is located in western Grays Harbor County. It is bordered to the north by Copalis Beach, to the south by Hogans Corner, to the east by State Route 109 and Cranberry Creek, and to the west by the Pacific Ocean. SR 109 leads north 13 miles (21 km) to Moclips and southeast 17 miles (27 km) to Hoquiam.

According to the United States Census Bureau, the CDP has a total area of 3.4 square miles (8.8 km^{2}), of which 3.3 square miles (8.6 km^{2}) are land and 0.1 square miles (0.2 km^{2}), or 1.96%, are water.

== Demographics ==
Historical population
Census	Pop.	Note	%±
2000	217		—
2010	200		−7.8%
2020	232		16.0%
U.S. Decennial Census; 1990 2000 2010

Ocean City first appeared as a census designated place in the 2000 U.S. census.

=== Racial and ethnic composition ===
Ocean City CDP, Washington – Racial and ethnic composition Note: the US Census treats Hispanic/Latino as an ethnic category. This table excludes Latinos from the racial categories and assigns them to a separate category. Hispanics/Latinos may be of any race.
Race / Ethnicity (NH = Non-Hispanic)	Pop 2000	Pop 2010	Pop 2020	% 2000	% 2010	% 2020
White alone (NH)	193	160	197	88.94%	80.00%	84.91%
Black or African American alone (NH)	2	1	5	0.92%	0.50%	2.16%
Native American or Alaska Native alone (NH)	13	9	8	5.99%	4.50%	3.45%
Asian alone (NH)	1	9	4	0.46%	4.50%	1.72%
Native Hawaiian or Pacific Islander alone (NH)	0	1	0	0.00%	0.50%	0.00%
Other race alone (NH)	0	3	0	0.00%	1.50%	0.00%
Mixed race or Multiracial (NH)	2	6	13	0.92%	3.00%	5.60%
Hispanic or Latino (any race)	6	11	5	2.76%	5.50%	2.16%
Total	217	200	232	100.00%	100.00%	100.00%

=== 2000 census ===
As of the census of 2000, there were 217 people, 117 households, and 54 families residing in the CDP. The population density was 49.9 people per square mile (19.3/km^{2}). There were 250 housing units at an average density of 57.5/sq mi (22.2/km^{2}). The racial makeup of the CDP was 88.94% White, 0.92% African American, 5.99% Native American, 0.46% Asian, 2.76% from other races, and 0.92% from two or more races. Hispanic or Latino of any race were 2.76% of the population.

There were 117 households, out of which 12.8% had children under the age of 18 living with them, 39.3% were married couples living together, 3.4% had a female householder with no husband present, and 53.8% were non-families. 41.9% of all households were made up of individuals, and 16.2% had someone living alone who was 65 years of age or older. The average household size was 1.85 and the average family size was 2.56.

In the CDP, the population was spread out, with 14.3% under the age of 18, 2.8% from 18 to 24, 26.7% from 25 to 44, 40.6% from 45 to 64, and 15.7% who were 65 years of age or older. The median age was 48 years. For every 100 females, there were 110.7 males. For every 100 females age 18 and over, there were 116.3 males.

The median income for a household in the CDP was $17,813, and the median income for a family was $26,979. Males had a median income of $16,250 versus $26,250 for females. The per capita income for the CDP was $15,468. None of the families and 14.0% of the population were living below the poverty line, including no under eighteens and 18.8% of those over 64.

== Education ==
The community is served by the North Beach School District.
