= Chow Chow Bridge =

Former bridge in the Quinault Indian Reservation, Washington

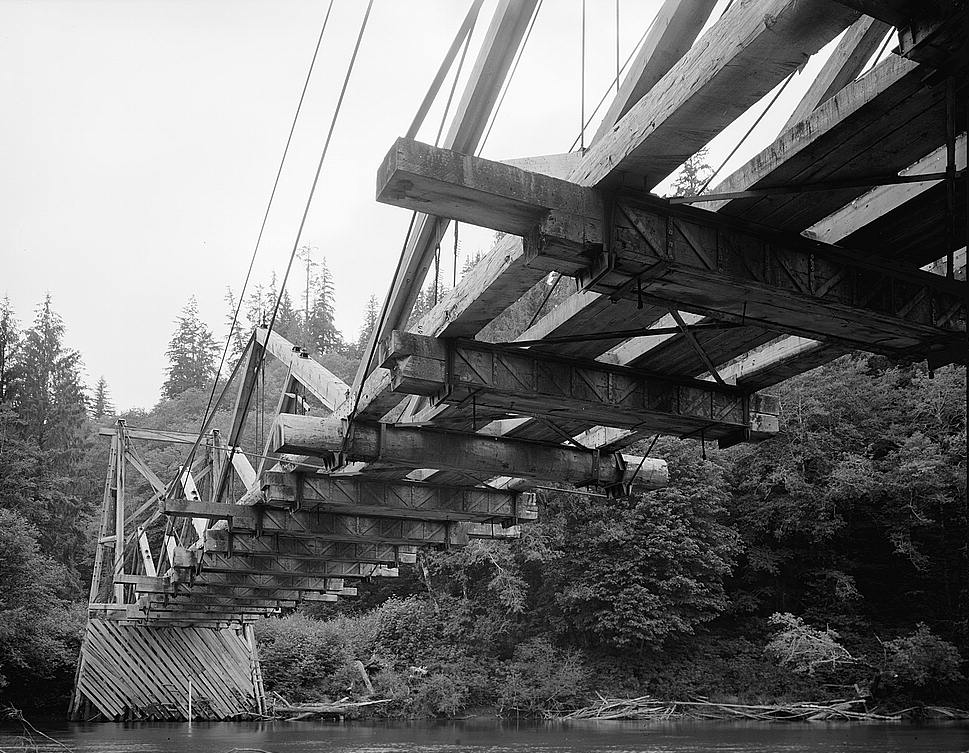
- Chow Chow Bridge circa 1968
- Coordinates: 47°21′11″N 124°11′34″W
- Crossed: Quinault River
- Locale: Quinault Indian Reservation

Characteristics
- Design: Cable-stayed bridge

History
- Designer: Frank Milward
- Constructed by: Aloha Lumber Company
- Built: 1952
- Collapsed: 1988

Location
- Interactive map of Chow Chow Bridge

The Chow Chow Bridge was an early, wooden cable-stayed bridge crossing the Quinault River on the Quinault Indian Reservation near Taholah, Grays Harbor County, Washington. It was built for the first time in 1952 and finally removed in 1988. Frank Milward designed the bridge for Aloha Lumber Company.

The bridge collapsed three times and was rebuilt twice. Timbers were made into cedar shakes for the tribal center in Taholah after the final 1988 collapse. It was one of the first cable-stayed bridges in the U.S., and the first in Washington.

In 1971, the bridge was closed by Joe DeLaCruz and other Quinault in protest of unfair resource extraction on the reservation.

== See also ==
- List of bridges documented by the Historic American Engineering Record in Washington (state)
