= Pacific Beach =

Pacific Beach may refer to:

- Pacific Beach, Washington
- Pacific Beach, San Diego, a community and beach
