= Ocean Shores Municipal Airport =

Airport in Washington, United States

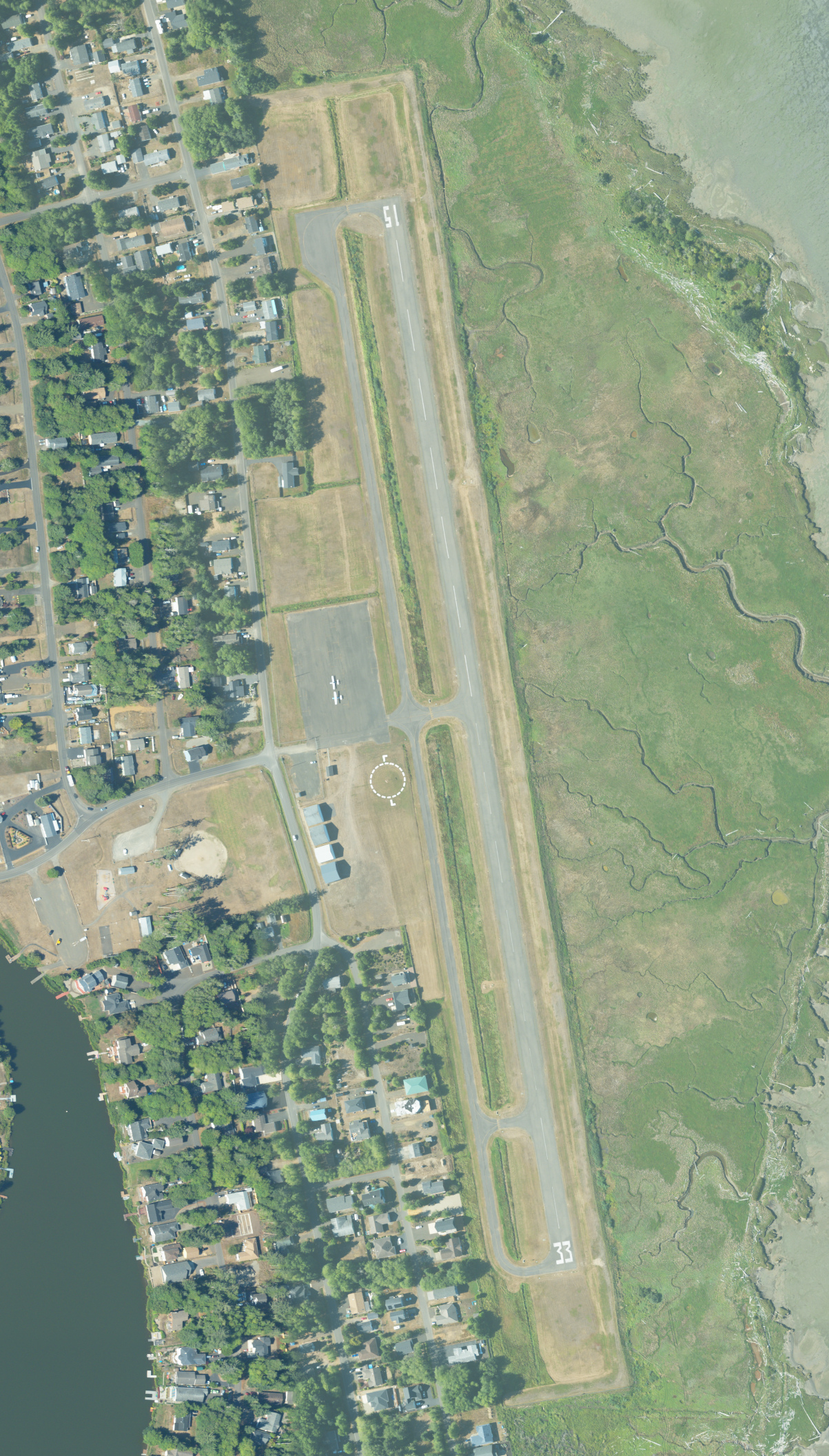
- Airport in August 2023
- IATA: none; ICAO: none; FAA LID: W04

Summary
- Airport type: Public
- Owner: City of Ocean Shores
- Serves: Ocean Shores, Washington
- Elevation AMSL: 15 ft (4.6 m)
- Coordinates: 46°59′57″N 124°08′33″W
- Website: Official website

Map
- Location of airport in Washington W04 (the United States)

Runways
Direction	Length		Surface
Direction	ft	m	Surface
15/33	3,100	945	Asphalt

Statistics (2011)
- Aircraft operations: 4,250
- Source: Federal Aviation Administration

Ocean Shores Municipal Airport (FAA LID: W04) is a city-owned, public-use airport located two nautical miles (4 km) northeast of the central business district of Ocean Shores, a city in Grays Harbor County, Washington, United States. It is included in the National Plan of Integrated Airport Systems for 2011–2015, which categorized it as a general aviation facility.

== Facilities and aircraft ==
Ocean Shores Municipal Airport covers an area of 49 acres (20 ha) at an elevation of 15 feet (5 m) above mean sea level. It has one runway designated 15/33 with an asphalt surface measuring 3,100 by 50 feet (945 x 15 m).

For the 12-month period ending May 31, 2011, the airport had 4,250 general aviation aircraft operations, an average of 11 per day.

== See also ==
- List of airports in Washington
