= Oyehut, Washington =

- Census-designated place
- Location of Oyehut, Washington
- Coordinates: 47°01′24″N 124°09′48″W
- Country: United States
- State: Washington
- County: Grays Harbor

Area
  - Total: 0.61 sq mi (1.59 km^{2})
  - Land: 0.60 sq mi (1.55 km^{2})
  - Water: 0.012 sq mi (0.03 km^{2})
- Elevation: 20 ft (6.1 m)

Population (2020)
  - Total: 79
  - Density: 130/sq mi (51/km^{2})
- Time zone: UTC-8 (Pacific (PST))
  - Summer (DST): UTC-7 (PDT)
- ZIP Code: 98550
- Area code(s): 360, 564
- FIPS code: 53-52378
- GNIS feature ID: 2652391

Oyehut is a census-designated place (CDP) in Grays Harbor County, Washington, United States. The population was 79 at the 2020 census, down from 85 at the 2010 census. Prior to 2010 it was part of the combined Oyehut-Hogan's Corner CDP.

== Geography ==
Oyehut is located in western Grays Harbor County at the south end of Washington State Route 115. The CDP is bordered to the south by the city of Ocean Shores, to the east by SR 115, to the north by Ocean City State Park, and to the west by the Pacific Ocean. Via SR 115 and SR 109, it is 18 miles (29 km) east to Hoquiam.

According to the United States Census Bureau, the Oyehut CDP has a total area of 0.62 square miles (1.6 km^{2}), of which 0.01 square miles (0.03 km^{2}), or 2.02%, are water.

== Demographics ==
Historical population
Census	Pop.	Note	%±
2010	85		—
2020	79		−7.1%
U.S. Decennial Census; 1990 2000 2010

Oyehut first appeared as a census designated place in the 2010 U.S. census formed from part of the deleted Oyehut-Hogans Corner CDP.

=== Racial and ethnic composition ===
Oyehut CDP, Washington – Racial and ethnic composition Note: the US Census treats Hispanic/Latino as an ethnic category. This table excludes Latinos from the racial categories and assigns them to a separate category. Hispanics/Latinos may be of any race.
Race / Ethnicity (NH = Non-Hispanic)	Pop 2010	Pop 2020	% 2010	% 2020
White alone (NH)	75	60	88.24%	75.95%
Black or African American alone (NH)	0	1	0.00%	1.27%
Native American or Alaska Native alone (NH)	1	3	1.18%	3.80%
Asian alone (NH)	2	0	2.35%	0.00%
Native Hawaiian or Pacific Islander alone (NH)	0	0	0.00%	0.00%
Other race alone (NH)	0	3	0.00%	3.80%
Mixed race or Multiracial (NH)	3	6	3.53%	7.59%
Hispanic or Latino (any race)	4	6	4.71%	7.59%
Total	85	79	100.00%	100.00%

== Education ==
The community is served by the North Beach School District.
