= Moclips River =

River in the United States of America

- Location of the mouth of the Moclips River in Washington Moclips River (the United States)

Location
- Country: United States
- State: Washington
- County: Grays Harbor

Physical characteristics
- Source: Macafee Hill
  - coordinates: 47°16′27″N 124°2′33″W
- Mouth: Pacific Ocean
  - coordinates: 47°14′52″N 124°13′10″W
  - elevation: 0 ft (0 m)
- Length: 12 mi (19 km)
- Basin size: 22 sq mi (57 km^{2})

The Moclips River is a river in the U.S. state of Washington. It is about 12 miles (19 km) long. Its main tributary, the North Fork Moclips River, is longer than the main stem. The length of the North Fork, along with the lower main stem below the North Fork's confluence, is 17 miles (27 km). The drainage basin of the Moclips River is 22.4 square miles (58 km^{2}) in area.

== Course ==
Both the Moclips River and its main tributary, the North Fork Moclips River, originate on the slopes of Macafee Hill. Both flow generally west. The North Fork joins the main river about 2 miles (3.2 km) from the Pacific Ocean. The Moclips River empties into the Pacific near Moclips.

== History ==
According to Edmond S. Meany the word moclips comes from a Quinault word meaning a place where girls were sent as they were approaching puberty. However, according to William Bright, the name comes from the Quinault word meaning, simply, "large stream".

== See also ==
- List of rivers of Washington (state)
