= Pacific Beach, Washington =

- Census-designated place
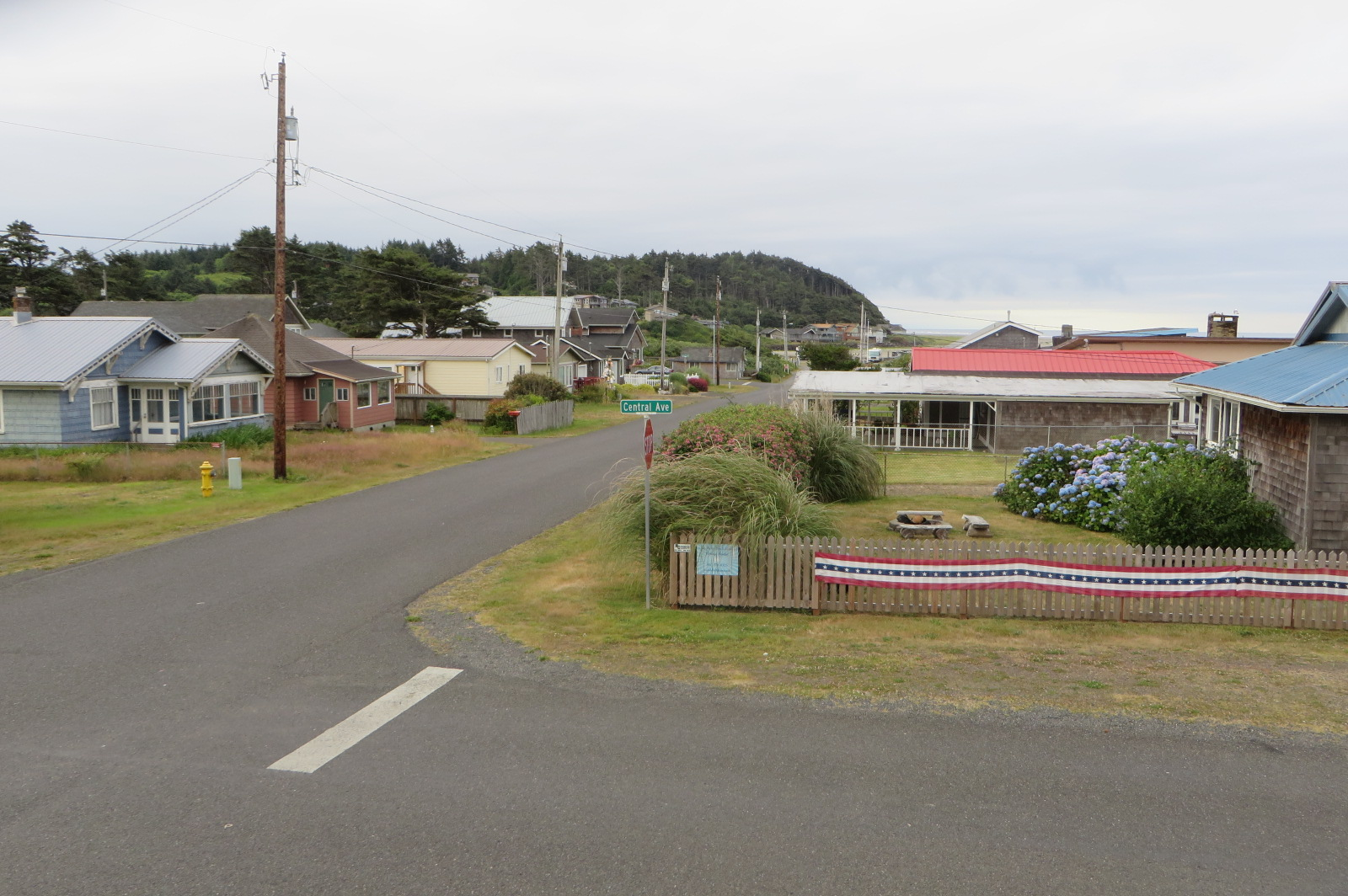
- View of the community

- Location within Washington (state) Location within the United States
- Coordinates: 47°12′54″N 124°11′48″W
- Country: United States
- State: Washington
- County: Grays Harbor

Area
  - Total: 1.23 sq mi (3.19 km^{2})
  - Land: 1.21 sq mi (3.13 km^{2})
  - Water: 0.027 sq mi (0.07 km^{2})
- Elevation: 89 ft (27 m)

Population (2020)
  - Total: 280
  - Density: 230/sq mi (89/km^{2})
- Time zone: UTC-8 (Pacific (PST))
  - Summer (DST): UTC-7 (PDT)
- ZIP Code: 98571
- Area code(s): 360, 564
- FIPS code: 53-52530
- GNIS feature ID: 2585017

Pacific Beach is a census-designated place (CDP) in Grays Harbor County, Washington, United States. The population was 280 at the 2020 census, down from 291 at the 2010 census. Prior to 2010 it was part of the Moclips CDP.

== Geography ==
Pacific Beach is located in western Grays Harbor County, along the Pacific Ocean. It is bordered to the north by Moclips and to the south by Joe Creek. The CDP includes the neighborhood of Highland Heights, north of Pacific Beach proper. State Route 109 passes through the CDP, leading north through Moclips 11 miles (18 km) to its terminus at Taholah, and south 8 miles (13 km) to Copalis Beach. Hoquiam is 25 miles (40 km) to the southeast.

According to the United States Census Bureau, the Pacific Beach CDP has a total area of 1.2 square miles (3.2 km^{2}), of which 0.03 square miles (0.07 km^{2}), or 2.07%, are water.

== Demographics ==
Historical population
Census	Pop.	Note	%±
2010	291		—
2020	280		−3.8%
U.S. Decennial Census; 2000 2010

Pacific Beach first appeared as a census designated place in the 2010 U.S. census formed from part of Moclips CDP.

=== Racial and ethnic composition ===
Pacific Beach CDP, Washington – Racial and ethnic composition Note: the US Census treats Hispanic/Latino as an ethnic category. This table excludes Latinos from the racial categories and assigns them to a separate category. Hispanics/Latinos may be of any race.
Race / Ethnicity (NH = Non-Hispanic)	Pop 2010	Pop 2020	% 2010	% 2020
White alone (NH)	234	224	80.41%	80.00%
Black or African American alone (NH)	1	0	0.34%	0.00%
Native American or Alaska Native alone (NH)	22	26	7.56%	9.29%
Asian alone (NH)	0	3	0.00%	1.07%
Native Hawaiian or Pacific Islander alone (NH)	1	1	0.34%	0.36%
Other race alone (NH)	0	0	0.00%	0.00%
Mixed race or Multiracial (NH)	22	16	7.56%	5.71%
Hispanic or Latino (any race)	11	10	3.78%	3.57%
Total	291	280	100.00%	100.00%

== Education ==
The community is served by the North Beach School District.
