= Oyehut-Hogans Corner, Washington =

- Former CDP
- Location of Oyehut-Hogans Corner, Washington
- Coordinates: 47°2′26″N 124°9′23″W
- Country: United States
- State: Washington
- County: Grays Harbor

Area
  - Total: 1.3 sq mi (3.4 km^{2})
  - Land: 1.3 sq mi (3.3 km^{2})
  - Water: 0.039 sq mi (0.1 km^{2})

Population (2000)
  - Total: 188
  - Density: 150/sq mi (57/km^{2})
- Time zone: UTC-8 (Pacific (PST))
  - Summer (DST): UTC-7 (PDT)
- FIPS code: 53-52380

Oyehut-Hogans Corner was a census-designated place (CDP) in Grays Harbor County, Washington, United States. The population was 188 at the 2000 census. At the 2010 census Oyehut and Hogans Corner were split into separate CDPs.

== Geography ==
The Oyehut-Hogans Corner CDP was located at 47°2′26″N 124°9′23″W (47.040689, -124.156273).

According to the United States Census Bureau, the CDP had a total area of 1.3 square miles (3.4 km^{2}), of which 1.3 square miles (3.3 km^{2}) was land and 0.04 square miles (0.1 km^{2}) of it (2.31%) was water.

== Demographics ==
As of the census of 2000, there were 188 people, 89 households, and 50 families residing in the CDP. The population density was 147.7 people per square mile (57.2/km^{2}). There were 162 housing units at an average density of 127.3/sq mi (49.3/km^{2}). The racial makeup of the CDP was 93.62% White, 4.79% Native American, 1.06% Asian, and 0.53% from two or more races.

There were 89 households, out of which 14.6% had children under the age of 18 living with them, 49.4% were married couples living together, 5.6% had a female householder with no husband present, and 42.7% were non-families. 33.7% of all households were made up of individuals, and 19.1% had someone living alone who was 65 years of age or older. The average household size was 2.11 and the average family size was 2.71.

In the CDP, the population was spread out, with 16.0% under the age of 18, 2.7% from 18 to 24, 18.1% from 25 to 44, 32.4% from 45 to 64, and 30.9% who were 65 years of age or older. The median age was 54 years. For every 100 females, there were 80.8 males. For every 100 females age 18 and over, there were 79.5 males.

The median income for a household in the CDP was $23,355, and the median income for a family was $28,313. Males had a median income of $24,250 versus $21,250 for females. The per capita income for the CDP was $13,227. None of the families and 4.4% of the population were living below the poverty line.
