= Quinault River =

River in the United States of America

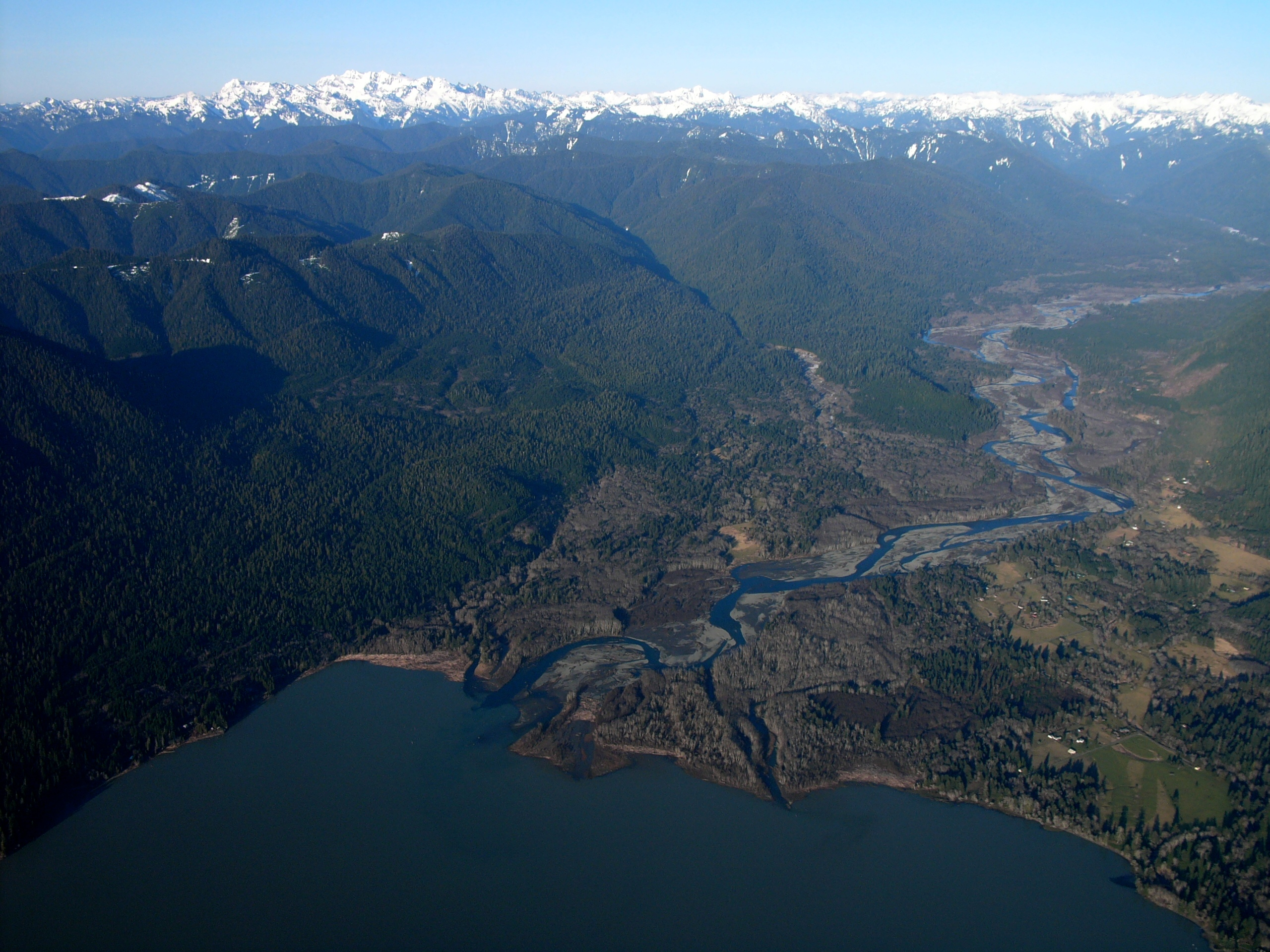
- Quinault River emptying into Lake Quinault

- Mouth of the Quinault River in Washington

Location
- Country: United States
- State: Washington

Physical characteristics
- Source: Olympic Mountains
  - coordinates: 47°42′6″N 123°20′3″W
- Mouth: Pacific Ocean
  - location: Taholah
  - coordinates: 47°20′58″N 124°17′59″W
- Length: 69 mi (111 km)
- Basin size: 188 sq mi (490 km^{2})

The Quinault River (/kwɪˈnɒlt/ or /kwɪˈnɔːlt/) is a 69-mile-long (111 km) river located on the Olympic Peninsula in the U.S. state of Washington. It originates deep in the Olympic Mountains in the Olympic National Park. It flows southwest through the "Enchanted Valley" to opposite Quinault Canyon. Several miles above Lake Quinault the river is joined by its main tributary, the North Fork Quinault River. The main stem Quinault River above this confluence is sometimes called the East Fork Quinault River. Below the confluence the river marks the boundary of Olympic National Park for several miles before emptying into Lake Quinault. After the lake, the Quinault River flows southwest, reaching the Pacific at Taholah. From Lake Quinault to the ocean, the river is contained within the Quinault Indian Reservation.

The Quinault River's drainage basin is 188 square miles (487 km^{2}) in area. Its main tributaries include the North Fork Quinault River, Graves Creek, Fox Creek, and Cook Creek.

A well maintained trail follows the East Fork of the Quinault from Graves Creek to the Enchanted Valley Ranger Station through old growth rain forest. In early summer snow melt creates many waterfalls in the valley, giving it the name "Valley of a Thousand Waterfalls".

The Quinault River has been reaching new recorded lows in recent years, as it was fed by the Anderson Glacier which had melted away by 2011.

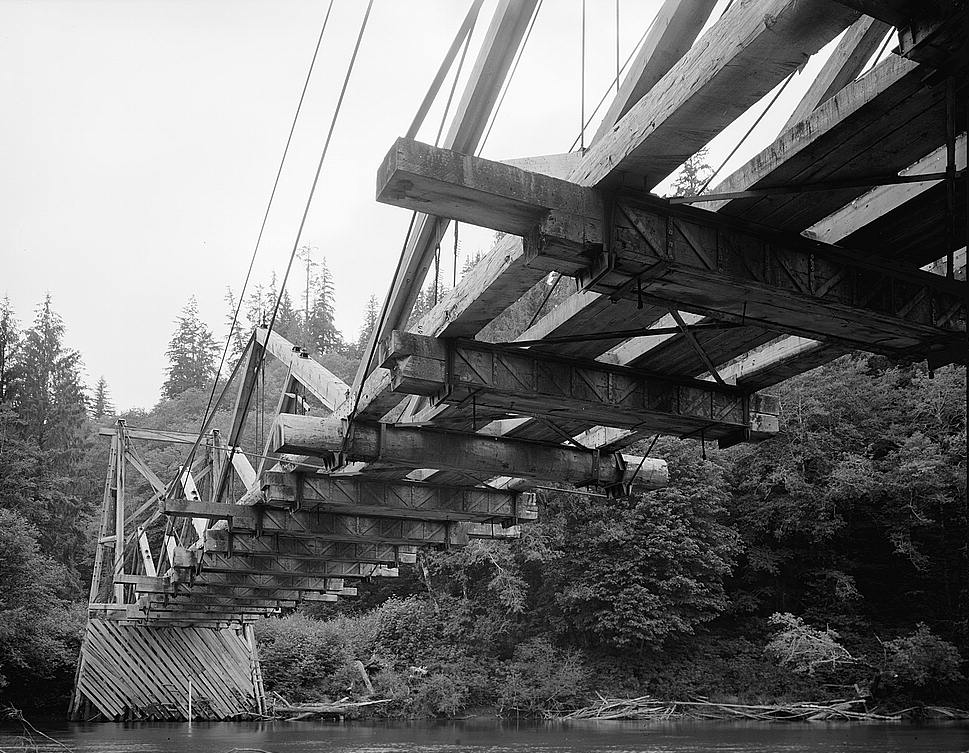
The Chow Chow Bridge ca. 1968

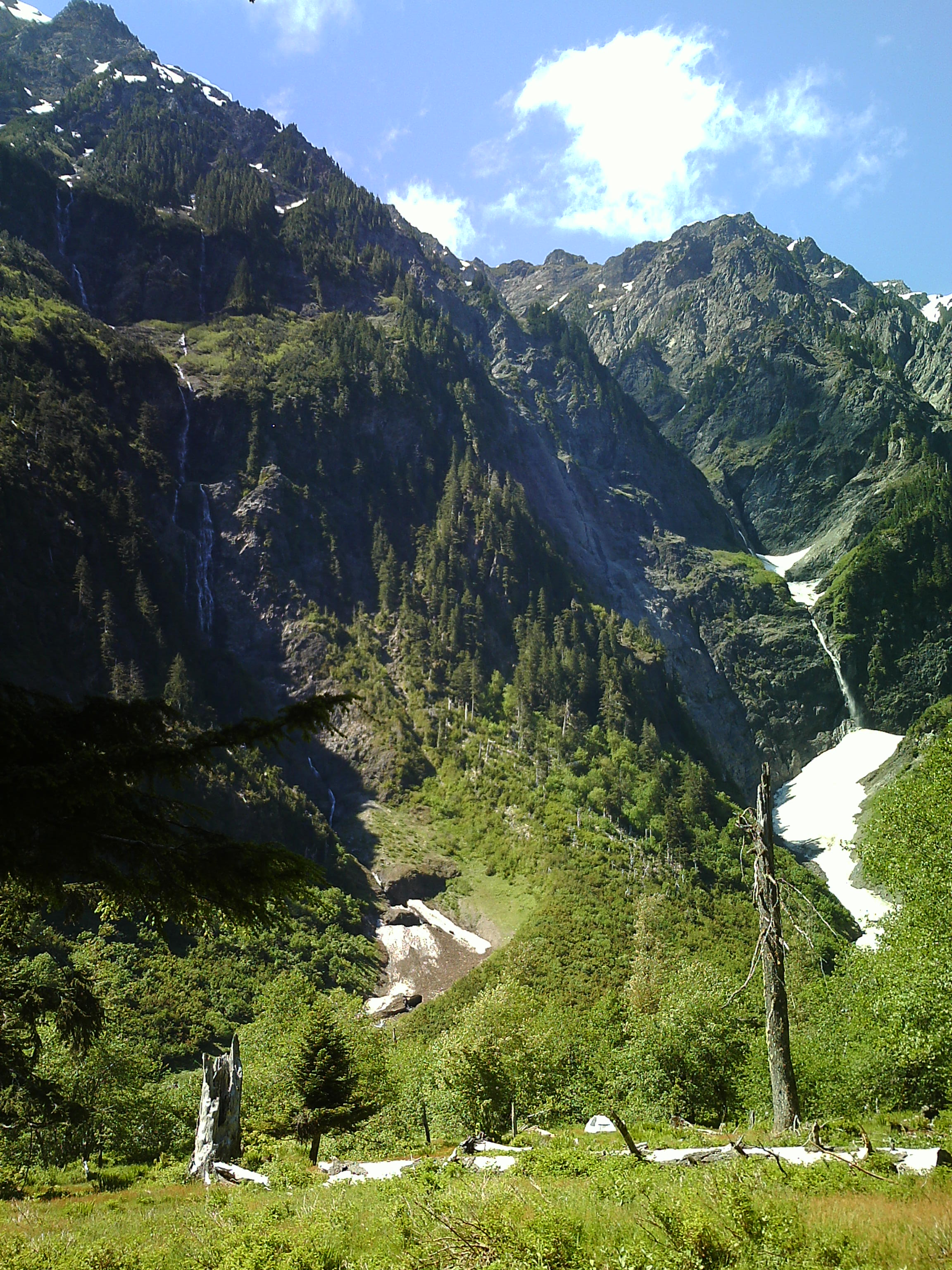
Enchanted Valley, East Fork Quinault River

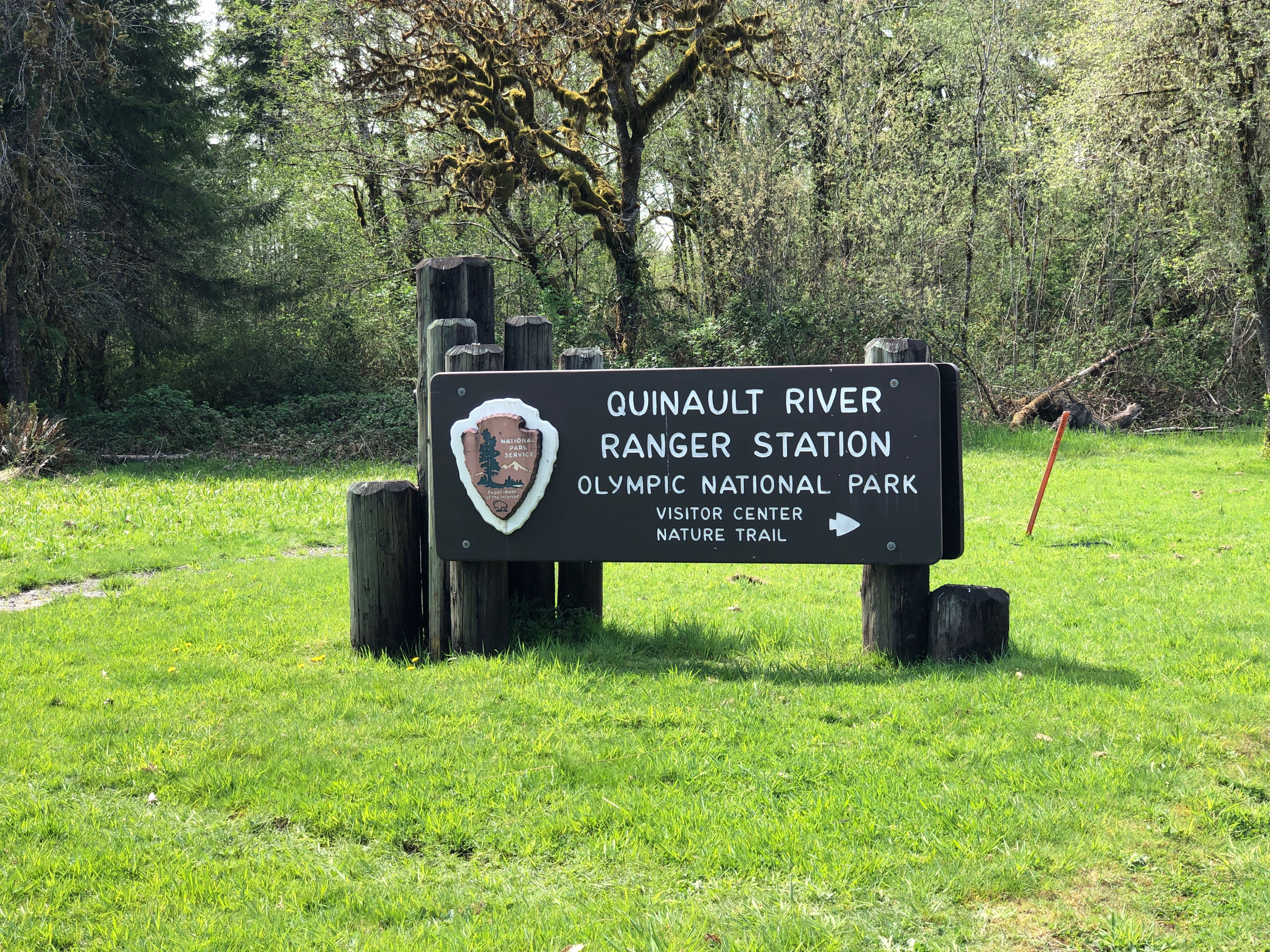

== See also ==
- List of rivers of Washington (state)
