= Griffiths-Priday State Park =

Washington state park in Grays Harbor County

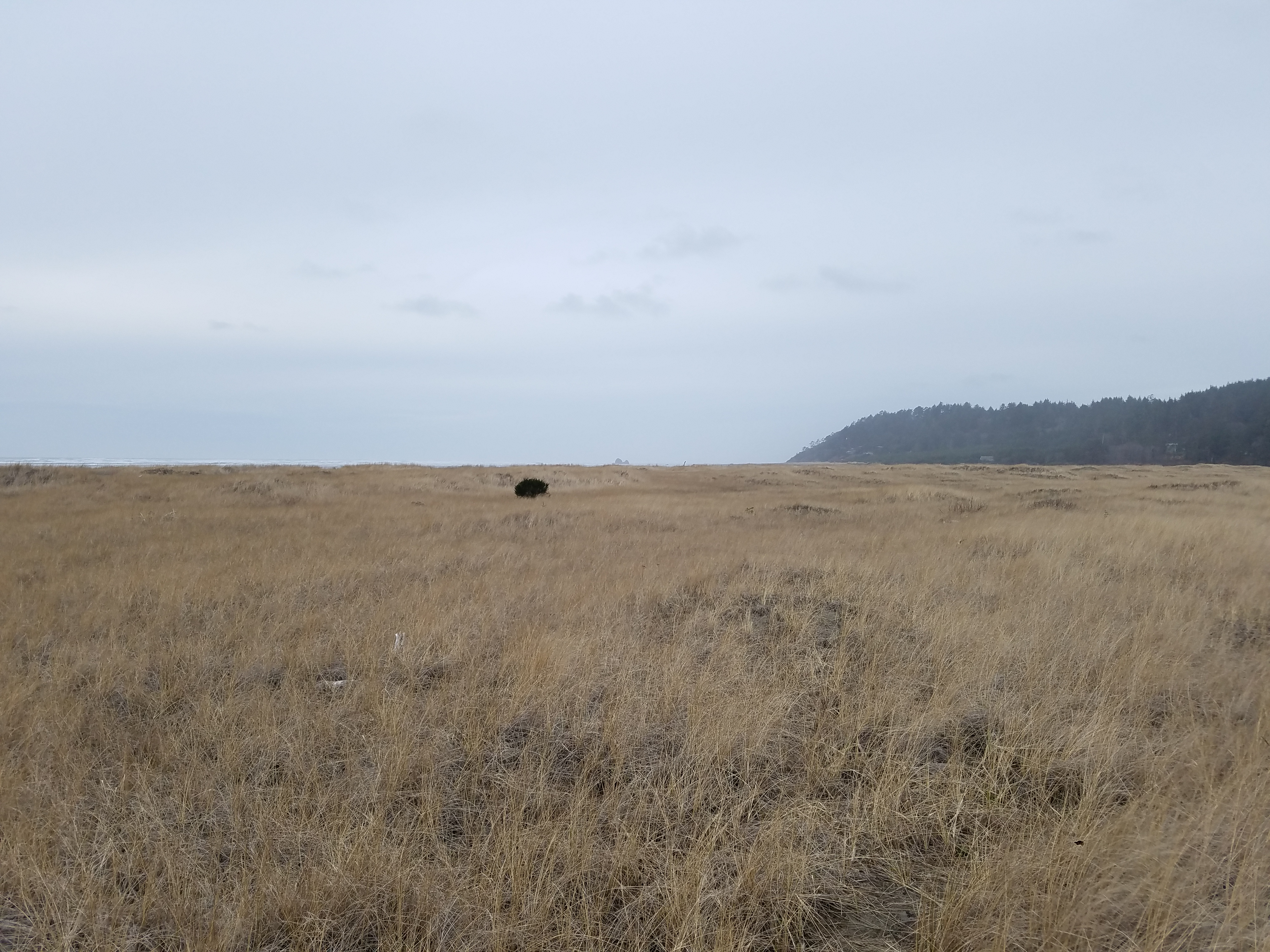
- Dunes with ocean and Copalis Rock in the distance

- Location within Washington (state) Location within the United States
- Location: Grays Harbor County, Washington, United States
- Coordinates: 47°07′34″N 124°10′47″W
- Area: 364 acres (147 ha)
- Elevation: 3 ft (0.91 m)
- Administrator: Washington State Parks and Recreation Commission
- Website: Official website

Griffiths-Priday State Park (formerly Griffiths-Priday Ocean State Park) is a 364-acre (147 ha) state-operated, public recreation area at the mouth of the Copalis River on the Pacific Ocean in Grays Harbor County, Washington. The park has beach, low dunes, and 8,316 feet (2,535 m) of ocean shoreline plus 9,950 feet (3,030 m) of freshwater river shoreline along both the Copalis River and the adjacent Connor Creek. The park includes the Copalis Spit, a small peninsula that serves as refuge for migratory birds. Park activities include picnicking, fishing, clam digging, beachcombing, birdwatching, mountain biking, and wildlife viewing, including migratory gray whales.
