= Ocean City State Park =

Public recreation area in Grays Harbor County, Washington, United States

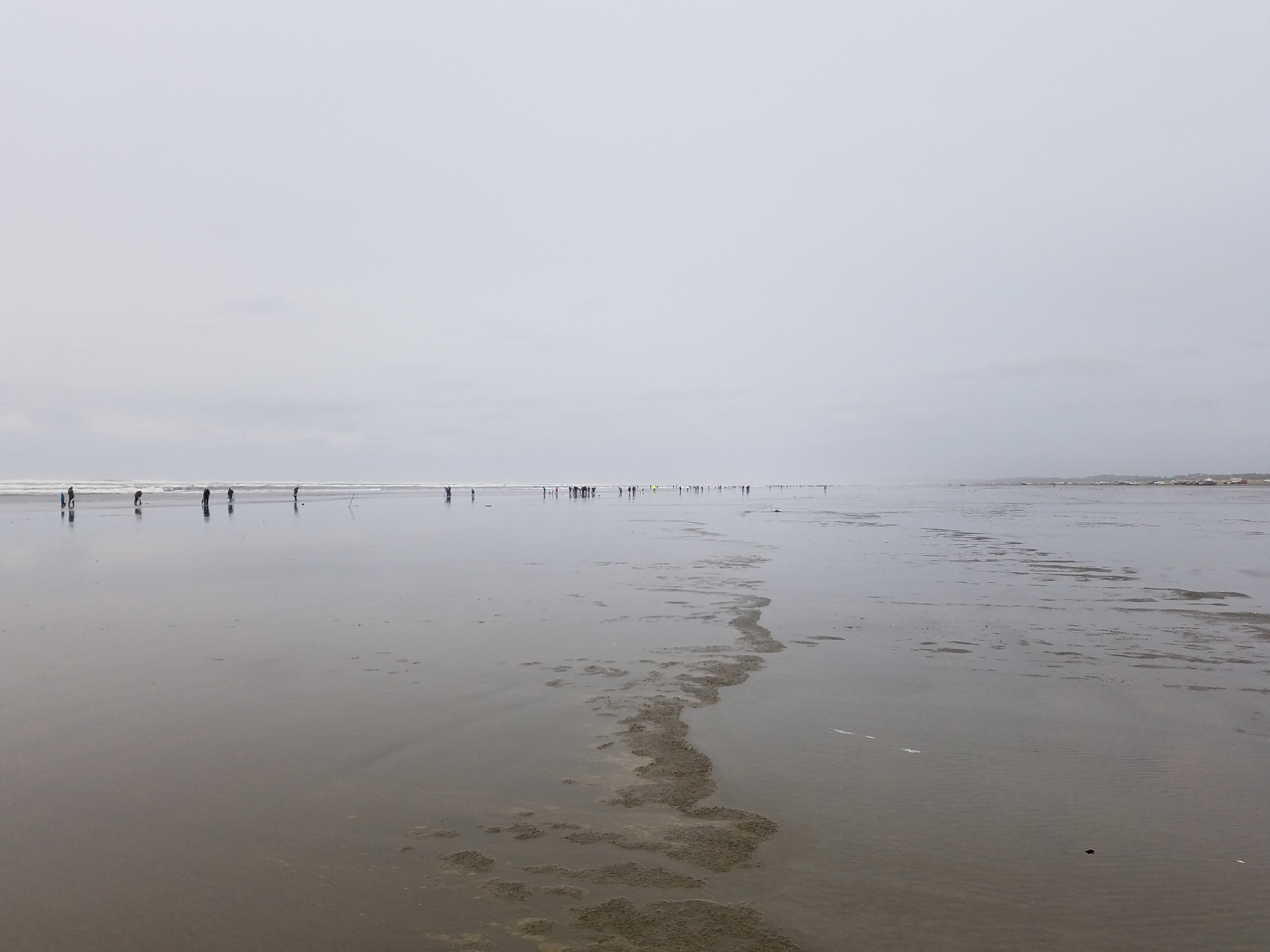
- Ocean City State Park beach with people digging for clams in the distance

- Location within Washington (state) Location within the United States
- Location: Grays Harbor County, Washington, United States
- Coordinates: 47°01′57″N 124°09′51″W
- Area: 170 acres (69 ha)
- Elevation: 20 ft (6.1 m)
- Administrator: Washington State Parks and Recreation Commission
- Website: Official website

Ocean City State Park is a public recreation area on the Pacific Ocean in Grays Harbor County, Washington, about 2 miles (3.2 km) north of downtown Ocean Shores. The park offers 170 acres (69 ha) of beach, dunes and lodgepole pine, and activities that include picnicking, camping, fishing, scuba diving, swimming, clam digging, crabbing, beachcombing, birdwatching, wildlife viewing, and interpretive programs.
