= Quinault people =

Native American peoples

Quinault
kʷínayɬ
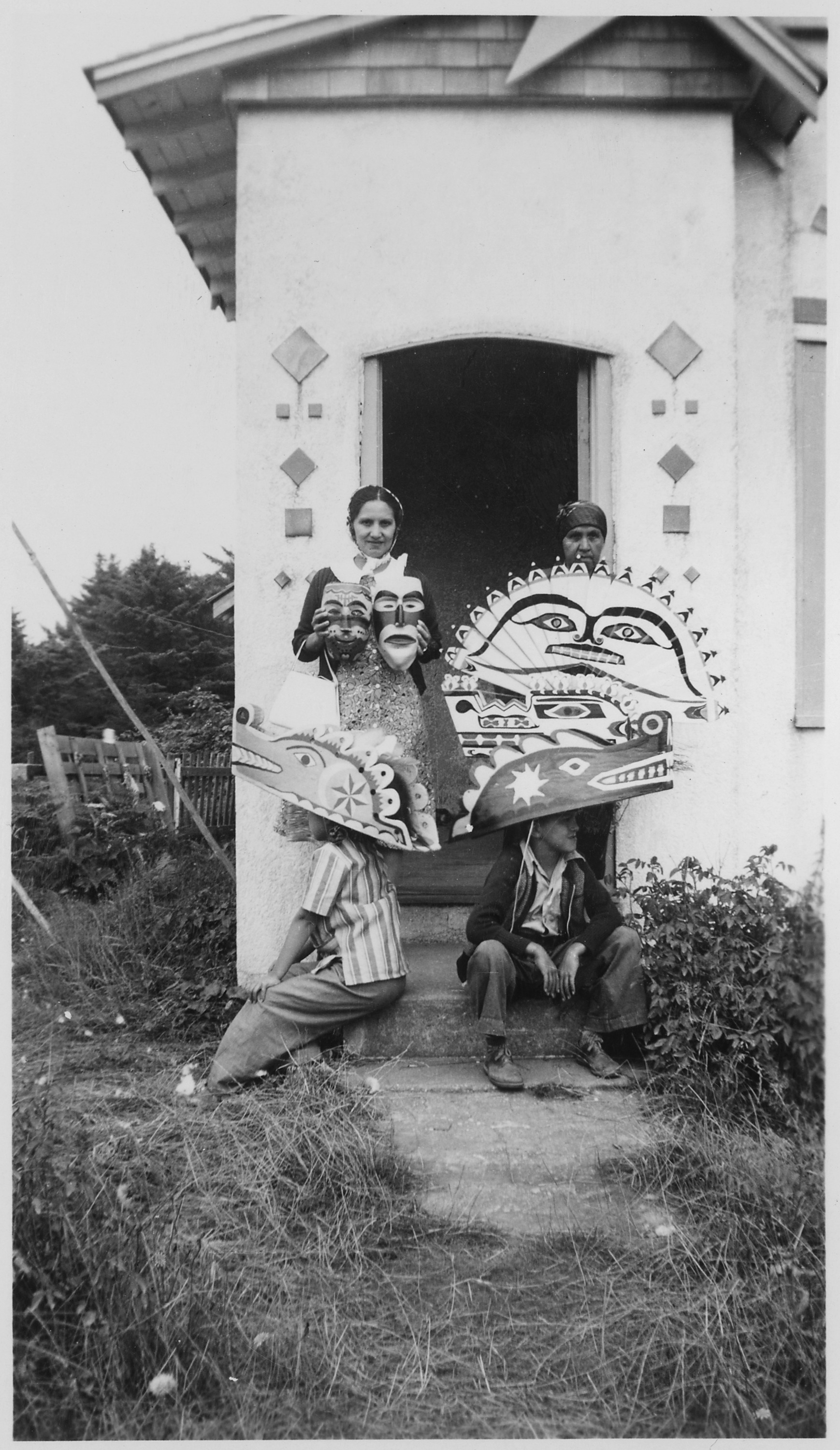
- Quinault family in Taholah Agency in the 1930s

Regions with significant populations
- United States (Washington)

Languages
- English, formerly Quinault language

The Quinault (/kwɪˈnɒlt/ or /kwɪˈnɔːlt/, kʷínayɬ) are a group of Native American peoples from western Washington in the United States. They are a Southwestern Coast Salish people and are enrolled in the federally recognized Quinault Indian Nation.

The name "Quinault" is a French-influenced anglicized version of kʷínayɬ /ˈkʷinajɬ/, the traditional name of a village at the mouth of the Quinault River, today called Taholah. The river, village, and people were given the anglicized name Quinault in 1787 by the maritime fur trader Charles William Barkley. It is also possible that both names come from a French trapper from the Quinault family who visited the area.

== Lands ==
The Quinault Indian Reservation, at 47°25′05″N 124°08′19″W, is located on the Pacific coast of Washington, primarily in northwestern Grays Harbor County, with small parts extending north into southwestern Jefferson County. It has a land area of 819.294 km^{2} (316.331 sq mi) and reported a resident population of 1,370 persons as of the 2000 census. The Quinault people settled onto reservation lands after signing the Quinault Treaty with the former Washington Territory in 1856. About 60% of the reservation's population lives in the community of Taholah, on the Pacific coast at the mouth of the Quinault River.

Motorists are cautioned that it is not possible to traverse the entire reservation on Highway 109, in spite of what some online mapping services indicate. Construction of the highway north from Taholah to U.S. Highway 101 was halted in the late 1960s. There is only limited access (for private property owners and tribe members) along the northern coast of the reservation.

Currently, only enrolled members of the Quinault Indian Nation and their guests are allowed onto the beaches throughout the reservation without a pass. Guests can obtain access passes that allow them to use the beaches for the day issued.

== Culture ==
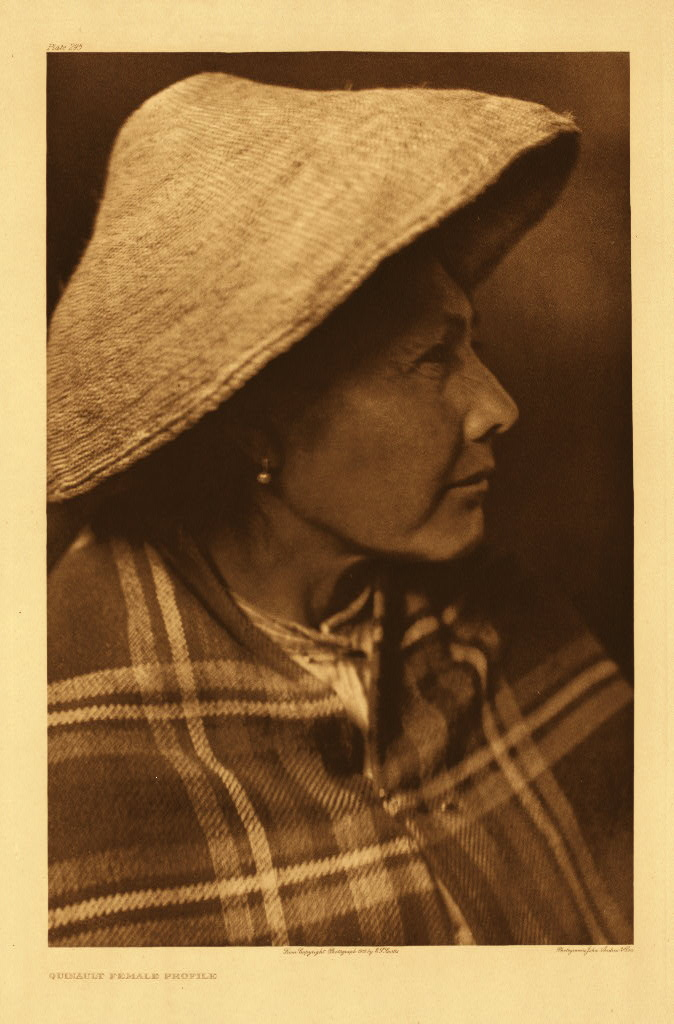
Quinault female profile by Edward S. Curtis, 1913

=== Basketry and weaving ===
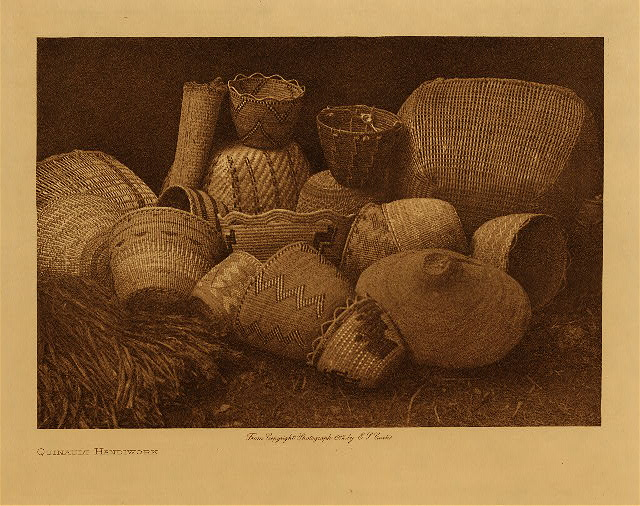
Photograph of Quinault baskets by Edward S. Curtis c. 1912

The Quinault people have been noted basket makers and weavers. Baskets were made from locally available materials such as reeds and grasses, spruce, maple and red cedar, and in many styles suited to the task at hand. For instance, burden baskets made for gathering oysters and other shellfish had an open weave to allow for drainage, and were made from water resistant materials like cedar bark. Archaeology has revealed some of the ways basketmaking evolved over time, and the Ozette Indian Village Archeological Site, about 40 miles (64 km) up the Pacific coast from the present-day Quinault reservation, has been an invaluable site that preserved objects subject to decay, such as baskets and blankets, in a mudslide.

Quinault basket artifacts are in many museums in the Northwest and around the world. The following were notable basket weavers of the Quinault prior to 1960.

- Anna Black of Queets
- Beatrice Black b. 1886 of Taholah
- Irene Charley (Shale) b. 1908 of Taholah
- Lena Hebalakp Charley (Bastian) b. 1877 of Taholah
- Maggie Charley (Kalama) b. 1870 of Hoquiam
- Mary Chips b. 1857 of Puyallup and La Push
- Emily Cleveland b. 1929 of Queets
- Lilly Cliff or Clip (Ford) b. 1865 of Neah Bay
- Agnes Garfield (Hudson) b. 1894 of Taholah
- Frances James (Bowechop) (1905–1972) of Neah Bay
- Maggie James (Wain)(Kelly) b. 1886 of Queets
- Anna Jette (Jackson) b. 1889 of Taholah
- Hannah Mason (Bowechop)(Saux)(Payne) (1895–1971) of Taholah
- Blanche Mowitch b. 1908 of Quinault
- Laura Obi (Sam) b. 1864 of Queets
- Charlotte Penn (Kalama) (1924–2010) of Queets
- Hazel Purdy (Underwood) b. 1908 of Taholah
- Blanche Lila Shale (McBride) b. 1925 of Taholah
- Ella Shileba Hobucket Wa-uc or Wa-bas-tub b. 1865 of La Push
- Sarah or Sally Shileba/Shalber Legg (James)(Mason)(Freeman) b. 1865 of Lake Quinault and Taholah, wife of Chief Taholah
- Joyce Simmons (Cheeka) b. 1901 of Neah Bay
- Ida Strom (Law) b. 1898 of Taholah
- Alice Taholah (Jackson) b. 1853 of Taholah, daughter of Chief Taholah
- Maggie Ward (Harlow) Tso-ba-dook b. 1886 of Queets
- Annie Williams (Waukenas) (1859–1951) of Taholah
- Leta Williams (Shale) (Sailto) b. 1928 of Queets

There has been some attempt to preserve traditional basketmaking techniques on the Quinault reservation, though the style has been intermixed with that of other tribes.

=== Housing ===
Traditionally, Quinault people lived in Longhouses.

== Economy ==
Many tribes within the Pacific Northwest receive per capita payments from their tribes but the Quinault Indian Nation currently does not. The economy for Quinault Indian Nation is mainly derived from the Quinault Beach Resort and Casino, timber, and various fishing entities (Quinault Pride Seafood, etc.). Quinault Indian Nation is the largest employer within Grays Harbor County.

== Communities ==
- Amanda Park
- Queets
- Qui-nai-elt Village
- Santiago
- Taholah

== See also ==
- MV Quinault
