= Moclips, Washington =

- Census-designated place
- Location of Moclips, Washington
- Coordinates: 47°14′06″N 124°12′10″W
- Country: United States
- State: Washington
- County: Grays Harbor

Area
  - Total: 1.81 sq mi (4.69 km^{2})
  - Land: 1.78 sq mi (4.62 km^{2})
  - Water: 0.027 sq mi (0.07 km^{2})
- Elevation: 62 ft (19 m)

Population (2020)
  - Total: 211
  - Density: 118/sq mi (45.7/km^{2})
- Time zone: UTC-8 (Pacific (PST))
  - Summer (DST): UTC-7 (PDT)
- ZIP Code: 98562
- Area code(s): 360, 564
- FIPS code: 53-46405
- GNIS feature ID: 2408849

Moclips is an unincorporated community and census-designated place (CDP) in Grays Harbor County, Washington, United States. The population was 211 at the 2020 census. It is located near the mouth of the Moclips River.

According to Edmond S. Meany, the word moclips comes from a Quinault word meaning a place where girls were sent as they were approaching puberty. However, according to William Bright, the name comes from the Quinault word meaning simply "large stream".

== History ==
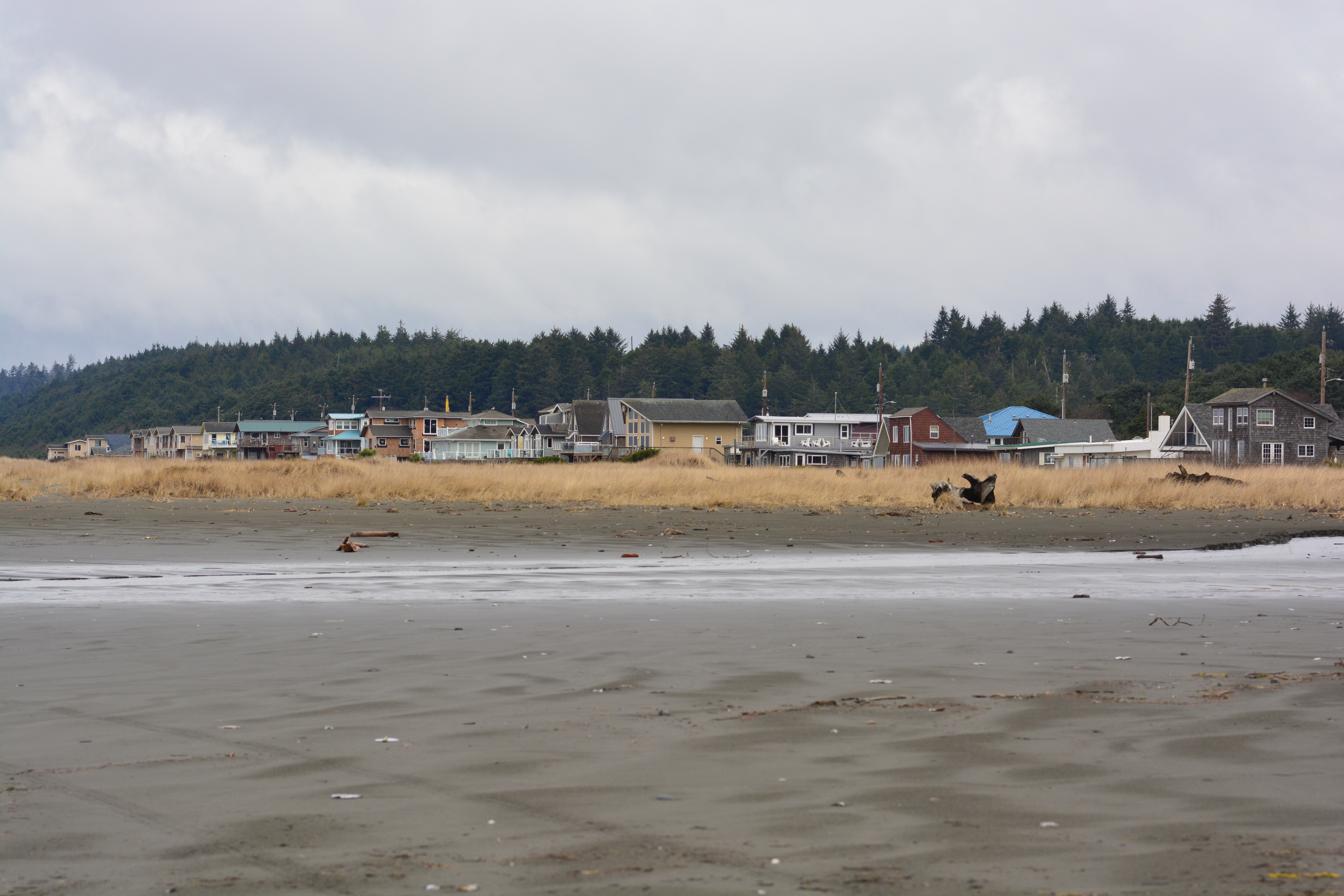
Houses along the beach, Moclips, 2023

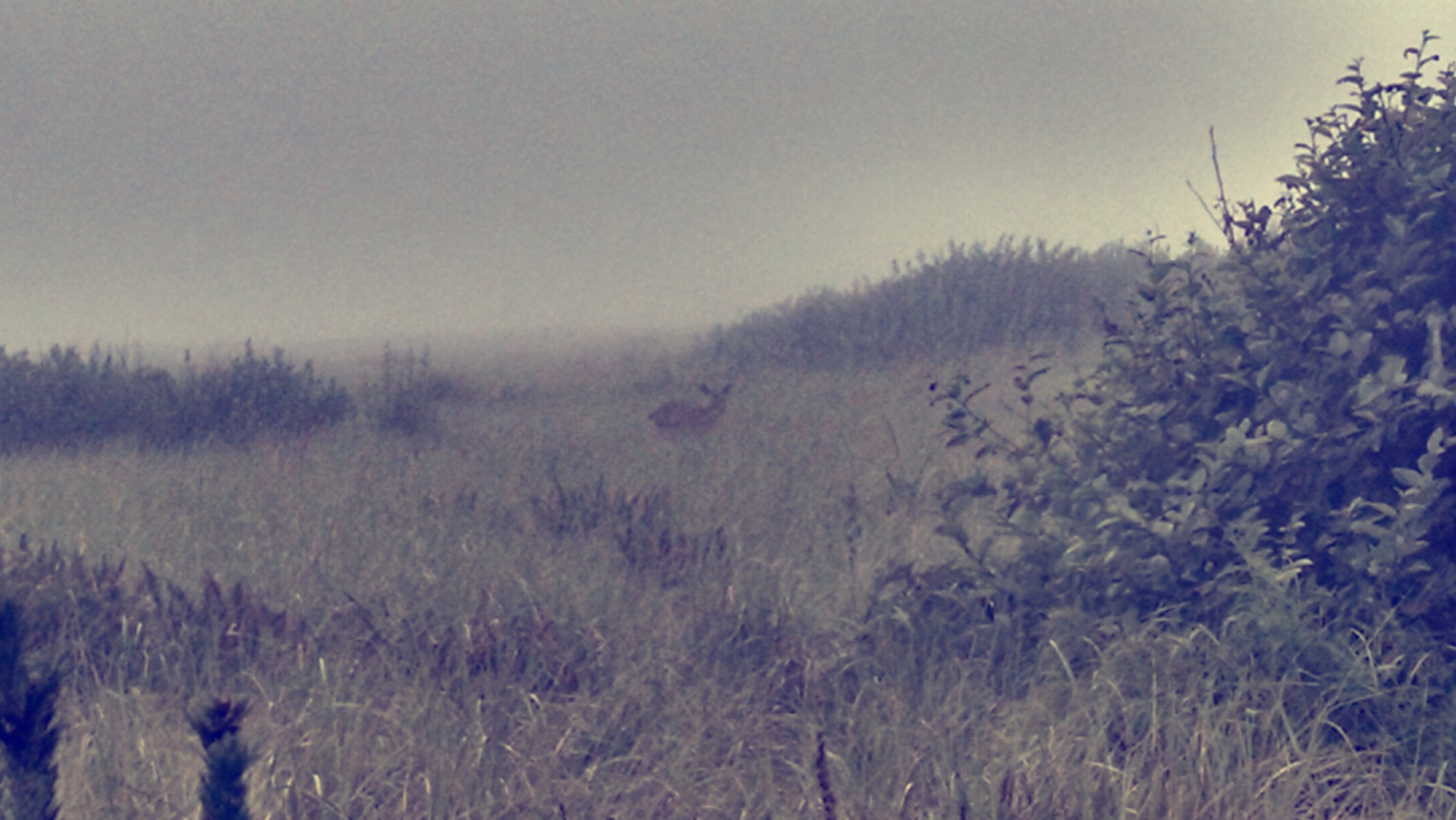
Moclips preserves a lot of its naturally wooded area in order to block high winds from the Pacific Ocean, making it home to several forest-dwelling fauna, such as deer.

Although settled earlier by homesteaders such as Steve Grover in 1862, Moclips was not incorporated until 1905 with the completion of the Northern Pacific Railway and the first Moclips Beach Hotel built by Dr. Edward Lycan. The hotel was a two-story, 150-room beachside resort. It burned down in 1905, just months after it was completed. Dr. Lycan then had a new, larger hotel built on the same site. It was three stories high, a block long, and loomed from the dunes. This Moclips Beach Hotel was completed in 1907 and advertised as having 270 "outside" rooms, with 2,000 feet (610 m) of 10-foot (3.0 m) covered veranda, and a perfect view of the Pacific Ocean, reported to be just 12 feet (3.7 m) from the hotel grounds. Moclips grew into a sizable town with restaurants, hotels, a candy store, theater, canneries, and the M.R. Smith Lumber and Shingle Mill. Many hotels, schools, canneries and shingle mills were quickly built. Four schools once taught children from Taholah to Ocean Shores. Class schedules for the local schools were based on the clamming tides. Two of these buildings exist today.

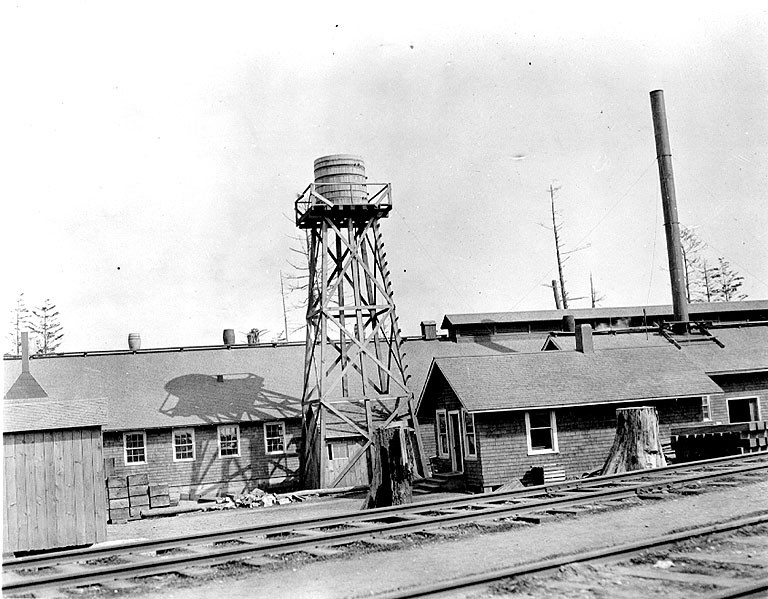
W.W. Kurtz's cannery in Moclips, 1915

In 1911 Moclips was struck by a series of fatal storms, eventually washing much of the town away. The Moclips Beach Hotel stood in pieces. By the end of 1913, there was nothing left of the hotel. Fires destroyed much of Moclips along the beach. In 1948 a hilltop welding accident destroyed many homes and businesses.

The U.S. Navy and Air Force made the neighboring town of Pacific Beach their home during World War II. The Navy still occupies property along the bluff in Pacific Beach - now a recreational use center for the military.

== Geography ==
Moclips is located in western Grays County, around 5 miles south of the major headland Point Grenville, called Point Haynisisoos by the local Quinault. The CDP includes the community of Moclips, plus the residential area of Sunset Beach. The CDP is bordered to the south by Pacific Beach, to the north by the Quinault Indian Reservation, and to the west by the Pacific Ocean.

Washington State Route 109 passes through Moclips, leading north 9 miles (14 km) along the Pacific coast to its terminus at Taholah and southeast 31 miles (50 km) to Hoquiam.

According to the United States Census Bureau, the CDP has a total area of 1.81 square miles (4.69 km^{2}), of which 1.78 square miles (4.62 km^{2}) are land and 0.03 square miles (0.07 km^{2}), or 1.48%, are water.

== Demographics ==
Historical population
Census	Pop.	Note	%±
2000	615		—
2010	207		−66.3%
2020	211		1.9%
U.S. Decennial Census; 1990 2000 2010

Moclips first appeared as a census designated place in the 2000 U.S. census.

=== Racial and ethnic composition ===
Moclips CDP, Washington – Racial and ethnic composition Note: the US Census treats Hispanic/Latino as an ethnic category. This table excludes Latinos from the racial categories and assigns them to a separate category. Hispanics/Latinos may be of any race.
Race / Ethnicity (NH = Non-Hispanic)	Pop 2000	Pop 2010	Pop 2020	% 2000	% 2010	% 2020
White alone (NH)	386	126	140	62.76%	60.87%	66.35%
Black or African American alone (NH)	1	1	1	0.16%	0.48%	0.47%
Native American or Alaska Native alone (NH)	141	52	36	22.93%	25.12%	17.06%
Asian alone (NH)	5	0	1	0.81%	0.00%	0.47%
Native Hawaiian or Pacific Islander alone (NH)	3	0	0	0.49%	0.00%	0.00%
Other race alone (NH)	0	0	1	0.00%	0.00%	0.47%
Mixed race or Multiracial (NH)	35	2	12	5.69%	0.97%	5.69%
Hispanic or Latino (any race)	44	26	20	7.15%	12.56%	9.48%
Total	615	207	211	100.00%	100.00%	100.00%

=== 2000 census ===
As of the 2000 census, the Moclips CDP included the area of Pacific Beach, which was split before the 2010 census to form its own CDP.

As of the census of 2000, there were 615 people, 273 households, and 146 families residing in the CDP. The population density was 189.1 people per square mile (73.1/km^{2}). There were 565 housing units at an average density of 173.7/sq mi (67.1/km^{2}). The racial makeup of the CDP was 64.72% White, 0.16% African American, 24.72% Native American, 0.81% Asian, 0.49% Pacific Islander, 2.44% from other races, and 6.67% from two or more races. Hispanic or Latino of any race were 7.15% of the population.

There were 273 households, out of which 17.2% had children under the age of 18 living with them, 36.6% were married couples living together, 11.4% had a female householder with no husband present, and 46.5% were non-families. 36.6% of all households were made up of individuals, and 11.4% had someone living alone who was 65 years of age or older. The average household size was 2.25 and the average family size was 2.90.

In the CDP, the population was spread out, with 21.0% under the age of 18, 6.5% from 18 to 24, 25.0% from 25 to 44, 31.9% from 45 to 64, and 15.6% who were 65 years of age or older. The median age was 44 years. For every 100 females, there were 109.2 males. For every 100 females age 18 and over, there were 106.8 males.

The median income for a household in the CDP was $27,500, and the median income for a family was $32,045. Males had a median income of $31,250 versus $21,250 for females. The per capita income for the CDP was $17,411. About 8.1% of families and 9.5% of the population were below the poverty line, including 2.3% of those under age 18 and 5.5% of those age 65 or over.

== Education ==
The community is served by the North Beach School District.

== Popular culture ==
The song "NW Apt." by Seattle-based rock band Band of Horses takes place in Moclips.

According to Michael Azzerad, Nirvana frontman Kurt Cobain and his band Fecal Matter opened for the Melvins at a Moclips beach bar called The Spot Tavern.
