= Copalis River =

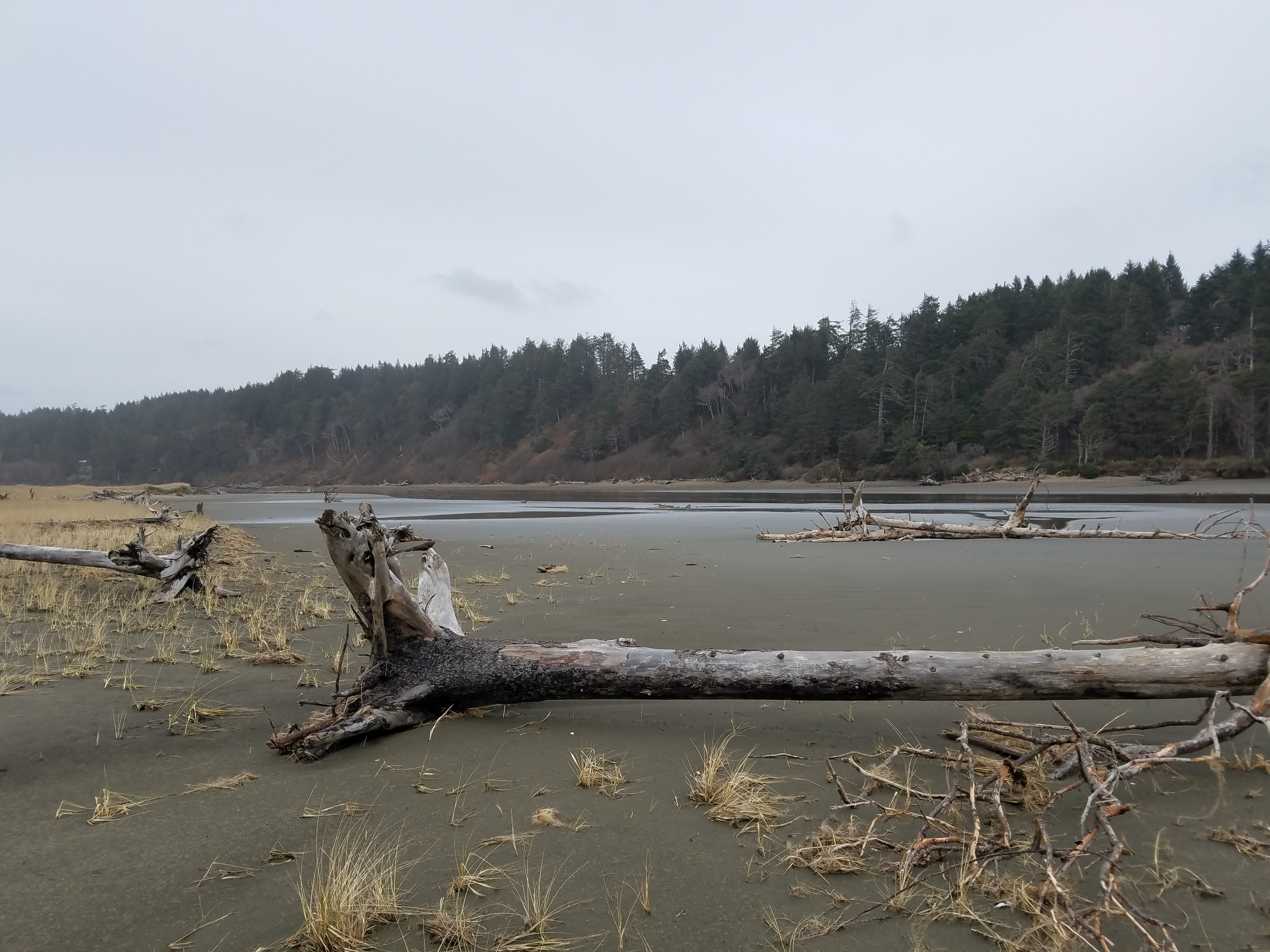
- Copalis spit near the mouth of the Copalis River

- Location of the mouth of the Copalis River in Washington

Location
- Country: United States
- State: Washington
- County: Grays Harbor

Physical characteristics
- Source: Olympic Peninsula
  - coordinates: 47°17′28″N 123°57′35″W
  - elevation: 360 ft (110 m)
- Mouth: Pacific Ocean
  - location: Copalis Beach
  - coordinates: 47°7′34″N 124°10′47″W
  - elevation: 0 ft (0 m)
- Length: 24 mi (39 km)

The Copalis River is a stream on the Olympic Peninsula in the U.S. state of Washington. It originates in the foothills on the southwest side of the Olympic Mountains and empties into the Pacific Ocean. The name "Copalis" comes from the Quinault language term /k'ʷpíls/. The Copalises are a Native American group. Both the Chehalis people and Quinault Indian Nation claim the Copalis are a subdivision of their tribe.

== Course ==
The Copalis River originates in the southwestern portion of the Olympic Peninsula a few miles south of the Quinault Reservation and just north of the Humptulips River. It flows southwest for about 24 mi (39 km) to the Pacific Ocean, emptying into the ocean at Copalis Beach in Griffiths-Priday State Park. At its mouth, the river is bordered by the Copalis spit, a small peninsula that serves as refuge for migratory birds. The bank of the Copalis is the site of a ghost forest.

== See also ==
- List of rivers of Washington (state)
