= Copalis Beach, Washington =

- CDP
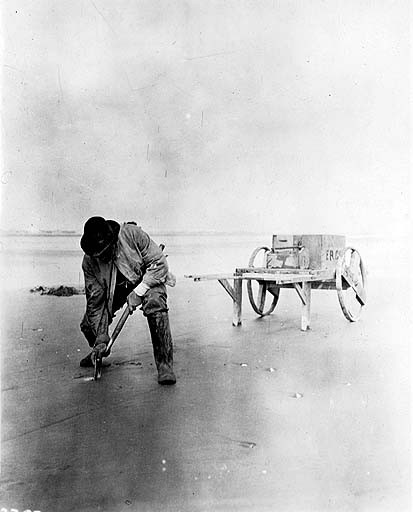
- Digging razor clams on the beach, 1915

- Location of Copalis Beach, Washington
- Coordinates: 47°07′34″N 124°10′30″W
- Country: United States
- State: Washington
- County: Grays Harbor

Area
  - Total: 3.8 sq mi (9.8 km^{2})
  - Land: 3.7 sq mi (9.6 km^{2})
  - Water: 0.12 sq mi (0.3 km^{2})
- Elevation: 10 ft (3.0 m)

Population (2020)
  - Total: 447
  - Density: 120/sq mi (47/km^{2})
- Time zone: UTC-8 (Pacific (PST))
  - Summer (DST): UTC-7 (PDT)
- ZIP Code: 98535
- Area code(s): 360, 564
- FIPS code: 53-14660
- GNIS feature ID: 2407656

Copalis Beach is a census-designated place (CDP) in Grays Harbor County, Washington, United States. The population was 447 at the 2020 census.

The name "Copalis" comes from the Quinault language term /k'ʷpíls/. The Copalis are a Native American group. Both the Chehalis people and Quinault Indian Nation claim the Copalis as a subdivision of their tribe.

== History ==
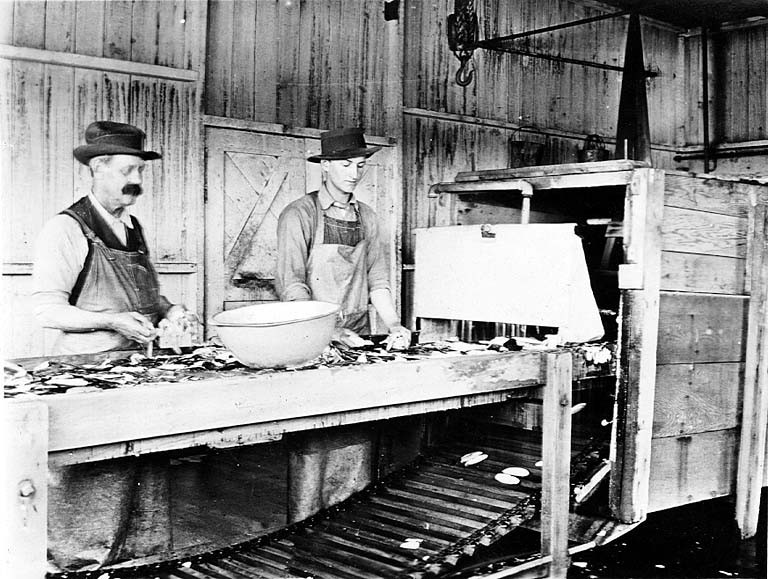
Working at a Sea Beach Packing Works clam opening machine

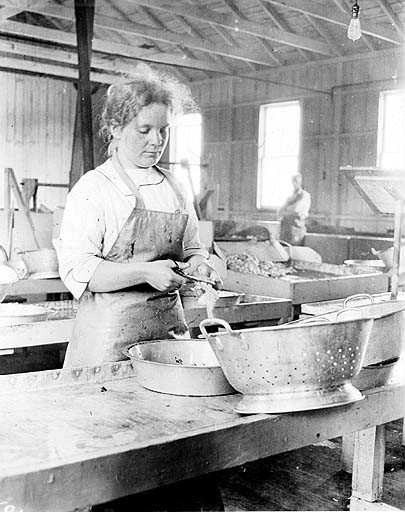
Sea Beach Packing Works cannery in Copalis, 1915

The Copalis Native Americans belong to the coastal division of the Salishan language family and historically occupied the area of Copalis River and the Pacific Coast between the mouth of Joe Creek and Grays Harbor. In 1805, Lewis and Clark estimated a population of 200 Copalis in 10 houses. The 5 individuals assigned to a "Chepalis" tribe in an enumeration given by Olson of the year 1888 probably refers to them.

The first non-Native American people settled in Copalis Beach in around the 1890s. Copalis, along with the beach of the same name, has become famed as the "Home of the razor clam." The community sits near the northern end of probably the greatest razor clam bed in the world for the flavor renowned variety abounds, apparently only in the Pacific Northwest, and particularly on Copalis Beach. During the commercial season, Copalis' normal population of about 350 persons, leaped fourfold.

During 1947 and 1948, commercial diggers took more than a million pounds of bivalves from Copalis Beach, earned themselves approximately $200,000.00 and brought huge additional sums to cannery men and workers. Tourists dug thousands of pounds more.

== Geography ==
According to the United States Census Bureau, the CDP has a total area of 3.8 square miles (9.8 km^{2}), of which, 3.7 square miles (9.6 km^{2}) of it is land and 0.1 square miles (0.3 km^{2}) of it (2.63%) is water.

== Demographics ==
Historical population
Census	Pop.	Note	%±
2000	489		—
2010	415		−15.1%
2020	447		7.7%
U.S. Decennial Census; 1990 2000 2010

Copalis Beach first appeared as a census designated place in the 2000 U.S. census.

=== Racial and ethnic composition ===
Copalis Beach CDP, Washington – Racial and ethnic composition Note: the US Census treats Hispanic/Latino as an ethnic category. This table excludes Latinos from the racial categories and assigns them to a separate category. Hispanics/Latinos may be of any race.
Race / Ethnicity (NH = Non-Hispanic)	Pop 2000	Pop 2010	Pop 2020	% 2000	% 2010	% 2020
White alone (NH)	441	361	385	90.18%	86.99%	86.13%
Black or African American alone (NH)	1	3	1	0.20%	0.72%	0.22%
Native American or Alaska Native alone (NH)	23	22	14	4.70%	5.30%	3.13%
Asian alone (NH)	7	3	6	1.43%	0.72%	1.34%
Native Hawaiian or Pacific Islander alone (NH)	0	0	0	0.00%	0.00%	0.00%
Other race alone (NH)	0	0	5	0.00%	0.00%	1.12%
Mixed race or Multiracial (NH)	10	17	19	2.04%	4.10%	4.25%
Hispanic or Latino (any race)	7	9	17	1.43%	2.17%	3.80%
Total	489	415	447	100.00%	100.00%	100.00%

=== 2000 census ===
As of the census of 2000, there were 489 people, 232 households, and 135 families residing in the CDP. The population density was 132.0 people per square mile (51.0/km^{2}). There were 484 housing units at an average density of 130.7/sq mi (50.5/km^{2}). The racial makeup of the CDP was 91.00% White, 0.20% African American, 4.70% Native American, 1.43% Asian, and 2.66% from two or more races. Hispanic or Latino of any race were 1.43% of the population.

There were 232 households, out of which 21.1% had children under the age of 18 living with them, 45.7% were married couples living together, 8.6% had a female householder with no husband present, and 41.4% were non-families. 34.5% of all households were made up of individuals, and 15.9% had someone living alone who was 65 years of age or older. The average household size was 2.11 and the average family size was 2.67.

In the CDP, the population was spread out, with 19.6% under the age of 18, 4.7% from 18 to 24, 20.0% from 25 to 44, 32.1% from 45 to 64, and 23.5% who were 65 years of age or older. The median age was 49 years. For every 100 females, there were 90.3 males. For every 100 females age 18 and over, there were 89.9 males.

The median income for a household in the CDP was $33,194, and the median income for a family was $33,807. Males had a median income of $45,694 versus $20,156 for females. The per capita income for the CDP was $17,437. About 17.3% of families and 17.4% of the population were below the poverty line, including 37.9% of those under age 18 and 16.3% of those age 65 or over.

== Education ==
The community is served by the North Beach School District.
