= Taholah, Washington =

Taholah, Washington tɑholɑ (Quinault)
- Unincorporated village Census-designated place
- Location of Taholah, Washington
- Coordinates: 47°19′37″N 124°15′22″W
- Country: United States
- State: Washington
- County: Grays Harbor

Area
  - Total: 3.53 sq mi (9.13 km^{2})
  - Land: 3.46 sq mi (8.96 km^{2})
  - Water: 0.069 sq mi (0.18 km^{2})
- Elevation: 144 ft (44 m)

Population (2020)
  - Total: 776
  - Density: 224/sq mi (86.6/km^{2})
- Time zone: UTC-8 (Pacific (PST))
  - Summer (DST): UTC-7 (PDT)
- ZIP Code: 98587
- Area code(s): 360, 564
- FIPS code: 53-70175
- GNIS feature ID: 2410051

Taholah (Quinault: tɑholɑ) is an unincorporated village on the Quinault Indian Reservation, in Grays Harbor County, Washington, United States. It was named in 1905 after a Quinault chief. For statistical purposes, the United States Census Bureau has defined Taholah as a census-designated place (CDP). The headquarters for the Quinault Indian Nation was moved to Taholah from the town of Quinault on the shore of Lake Quinault.

As of the 2020 census, Taholah had a population of 776.

== History ==
Taholah lies within a tsunami inundation zone and is at risk of flooding from rising sea levels due to climate change. The village has a 2,000-foot-long (610 m) seawall facing the Pacific Ocean, but it required several repairs due to damage sustained by breaches. The seawall was raised by 4 feet (1.2 m) by the U.S. Army Corps of Engineers in 2014 in response to more frequent flooding. In 2015, the tribal government proposed a $60 million plan to relocate the village to an uphill area southeast of the existing village. The relocation plan would first require the acquisition of 246 acres (100 ha) to be allocated to individuals with 175 homes for 129 families from the existing village, followed by the construction of new streets and water facilities.

A revised estimate of $150 million for the plan was released in 2017, with construction beginning two years later. The first part of the relocated village, a senior and children center named the Generations Building (WenɑsɡwəllɑʔɑW), opened in May 2021.

== Geography ==
Taholah is located in northwestern Grays Harbor County. The Quinault River empties into the Pacific Ocean on the northern edge of Taholah. Point Grenville, a major headland on the Washington coast, is 3 miles to the south. It is called Point Haynisisoos by the local Quinault.

Washington State Route 109 has its northern terminus in Taholah; the highway leads south 9 miles (14 km) to Moclips and 41 miles (66 km) to Hoquiam.

According to the United States Census Bureau, the Taholah CDP has a total area of 3.5 square miles (9.1 km^{2}), of which 3.5 square miles (9.0 km^{2}) are land and 0.1 square miles (0.2 km^{2}), or 1.92%, are water.

=== Climate ===
The climate in this area has mild differences between highs and lows, and there is adequate rainfall year-round. According to the Köppen Climate Classification system, Taholah has a marine west coast climate, abbreviated "Cfb" on climate maps. Average annual rainfall is 94 inches (2,400 mm).

== Demographics ==
Historical population
Census	Pop.	Note	%±
2000	824		—
2010	840		1.9%
2020	776		−7.6%

As of the census of 2000, there were 824 people, 240 households, and 197 families residing in the CDP. The population density was 485.7 people per square mile (187.1/km^{2}). There were 249 housing units at an average density of 146.8/sq mi (56.6/km^{2}). The racial makeup of the CDP was 4.85% White, 93.20% Native American, 0.12% Asian, 0.73% from other races, and 1.09% from two or more races. Hispanic or Latino of any race were 1.46% of the population.

There were 240 households, out of which 44.6% had children under the age of 18 living with them, 39.6% were married couples living together, 28.3% had a female householder with no husband present, and 17.9% were non-families. 13.3% of all households were made up of individuals, and 2.9% had someone living alone who was 65 years of age or older. The average household size was 3.43 and the average family size was 3.63.

In the CDP, the population was spread out, with 38.1% under the age of 18, 8.1% from 18 to 24, 27.4% from 25 to 44, 21.1% from 45 to 64, and 5.2% who were 65 years of age or older. The median age was 28 years. For every 100 females, there were 116.3 males. For every 100 females age 18 and over, there were 113.4 males.

The median income for a household in the CDP was $24,688, and the median income for a family was $25,875. Males had a median income of $21,964 versus $24,250 for females. The per capita income for the CDP was $9,373. About 29.0% of families and 34.9% of the population were below the poverty line, including 41.5% of those under age 18 and 30.0% of those age 65 or over.

== Education ==
The community is served by the Taholah School District.

The Taholah School District's mascot is the Chitwhin, meaning "black bear" in Quinault.
