= Aloha (disambiguation) =

Aloha is a word in the Hawaiian language for love, affection, peace, compassion and mercy.

Aloha may also refer to:

== Arts ==
=== Film and TV ===
- Aloha (1931 film), a 1931 American melodrama directed by Albert Rogell
- Aloha (1951 film), a 1950 Malay-language film by B. S. Rajhans
- Aloha (2015 film), a 2015 American romantic comedy film written, produced and directed by Cameron Crowe
- "Aloha" (Hawaii Five-0), the series finale of the American television series Hawaii Five-0
- Aloha, a contestant on Real Chance of Love 2

=== Music ===
==== Performers ====
- Aloha (band), a band on Polyvinyl Record Co

==== Albums ====
- Aloha, a 1981 album by Henry Kaiser
- Aloha, a 1984 album by Italian band Pooh
- Aloha (album), a 2012 album by Todd Smith under the moniker El-Creepo!
- Aloha (EP), by Diarrhea Planet

==== Songs ====
- "Aloha", Glenn Miller And His Orchestra, The Royal Tahitians, etc., often referring to Aloha ʻOe
- "Aloha", single by Afric Simone 1976
- "Aloha", song by B. J. Thomas 1978
- "Aloha" (Fat Joe song), a song by Fat Joe
- "Aloha", a song by Møme

== Businesses ==
- Aloha Air Cargo
- Aloha Airlines
- Aloha Petroleum
- Aloha Yachts, a Canadian boat building company
- Island Air (Hawaii), formerly called Aloha IslandAir

== Clothing ==
- Aloha shirt
- Muumuu, also called an aloha dress

== Computing ==
- ALOHA protocol, a networking protocol designed around ALOHAnet
- ALOHAnet, an early computer networking system developed at the University of Hawaii

== Places ==
- Aloha, Louisiana
- Aloha, Michigan
- Aloha, Oregon
- Aloha, Washington, a community in Grays Harbor County, Washington
- Aloha (crater), a lunar crater

== Other uses ==
- Aloha (planthopper), a genus of planthoppers
- ALOHA, Aboriginal Lands of Hawaiian Ancestry, a Hawaiian organization seeking reparations from the U.S. government
- Aloha Wanderwell (1906–1996), Canadian adventurer and filmmaker
- USS Aloha (SP-317), a US Navy patrol vessel in commission from 1917 to 1919
- Aloha-class freighter, a cargo ship design
- Aloha, a boss in the 2005 action-puzzle video game Pac-Pix
- Operation Aloha (disambiguation)

== See also ==
- Aroha
