= Malone-Porter, Washington =

- Former CDP
- Location of Malone-Porter, Washington
- Coordinates: 46°58′42″N 123°18′21″W
- Country: United States
- State: Washington
- County: Grays Harbor

Area
  - Total: 10.5 sq mi (27.3 km^{2})
  - Land: 10.5 sq mi (27.3 km^{2})
  - Water: 0 sq mi (0.0 km^{2})
- Elevation: 400 ft (120 m)

Population (2000)
  - Total: 473
  - Density: 45/sq mi (17.3/km^{2})
- Time zone: UTC-8 (Pacific (PST))
  - Summer (DST): UTC-7 (PDT)
- ZIP Code: 98559 (Malone)
- Area code(s): 360, 564
- FIPS code: 53-42355

Malone-Porter was a census-designated place (CDP) in Grays Harbor County, Washington, United States. The population was 473 at the 2000 census. For the 2010 census the area was split into two CDPs, Malone and Porter, two small towns located just off U.S. Route 12, southeast of Elma and northwest of Oakville, and along a shortline that is part of Puget Sound and Pacific Railroad.

== Malone ==
Malone is the home of Red's Hop N' Market, a mini-mart that is also the U.S. Postal Service's (USPS) first official village post office, a post office located within an existing retail establishment, with limited service and no full-time postmaster. The mini-mart's owner is paid $2,000/year by the US Postal Service to sell stamps and shipping supplies and allow the USPS to place mailboxes on-site.

== Porter ==
Porter was named after Fairchild Porter, who settled in the area around 1860.

Much of Porter was destroyed by fire on January 31, 1924. Porter Saloon was re-built later that same year. When it re-opened in 1933 following the repeal of Prohibition, it was one of the first establishments to receive a liquor license in the State of Washington.

== Geography ==
The Malone-Porter CDP was located at 46°57′26″N 123°19′16″W (46.957344, -123.321008).

According to the United States Census Bureau, the CDP had a total area of 27.3 km^{2} (10.5 sq mi), all of it land.

== Demographics ==
As of the census of 2000, there were 473 people, 172 households, and 124 families residing in the CDP. The population density was 44.9 people per square mile (17.3/km^{2}). There were 194 housing units at an average density of 18.4/sq mi (7.1/km^{2}). The racial makeup of the CDP was 90.70% White, 0.85% Native American, 0.21% Asian, 1.06% from other races, and 7.19% from two or more races. Hispanic or Latino of any race were 6.77% of the population.

There were 172 households, out of which 37.8% had children under the age of 18 living with them, 61.0% were married couples living together, 6.4% had a female householder with no husband present, and 27.9% were non-families. 20.9% of all households were made up of individuals, and 7.0% had someone living alone who was 65 years of age or older. The average household size was 2.75 and the average family size was 3.23.

In the CDP, the population was spread out, with 29.6% under the age of 18, 6.8% from 18 to 24, 29.2% from 25 to 44, 24.5% from 45 to 64, and 9.9% who were 65 years of age or older. The median age was 36 years. For every 100 females, there were 97.9 males. For every 100 females age 18 and over, there were 99.4 males.

The median income for a household in the CDP was $37,875, and the median income for a family was $43,036. Males had a median income of $32,266 versus $27,768 for females. The per capita income for the CDP was $15,434. About 9.1% of families and 8.7% of the population were below the poverty line, including 9.5% of those under age 18 and none of those age 65 or over.
