= Hazel Pete =

American basket weaver

Hazel Pete (March 21, 1914 – January 2, 2003) was a woman of the Chehalis Tribe in Washington State and known for her rare skills in the ancient craft of Chehalis basket weaving.

== Early life ==
Hazel Doris Pete was born on March 21, 1914, on the Chehalis Indian Reservation in Grays Harbor County in the State of Washington. Her father was a member of the Chehalis Tribe and worked as a farmer, a logger, and on the Tribe's police force. Her mother was not of the Chehalis sect but rather belonged to the Kwalhioqua—a tribe no longer in existence. They married when they were fifteen years of age and had four children including Hazel. Pete grew up in difficult conditions, but poverty and hardship were common characteristics on reservations of the day. A love of learning was transferred to Pete at early age. Even at the age of 4, she would secretly tag along with her older siblings on their three-mile trek to the Chehalis Day school even though she was not yet old enough to attend. This strong appreciation for learning would eventually take on an even more significant role in her life years later (Collins 2001, p. 16)

== Education ==
When Pete began her formal education, she came under a federally mandated system designed to assimilate Native Americans into the dominant culture and replace Indigenous languages, beliefs, and traditions with those of mainstream American society. The boarding school system formed part of a broader federal policy of assimilation and territorial dispossession that sought to weaken tribal identities, reduce tribal autonomy, and facilitate the transfer of Indigenous lands to non-Native ownership. Every aspect of the life Pete knew would be replaced or undermined by a new language, clothing, beliefs, and philosophies. This phenomenon would have a profound effect on Pete's future career choice and on her life as whole (Collins 2001, p. 16).

Like her siblings, Hazel first went to the Chehalis Day School but was moved to a grade school in Oakville, WA after third grade. It was here where she experienced a degree of racism and bigotry from white children who greatly outnumbered Native Americans in attendance. She left Oakville in 1925, due in part to the death of her sixteen-year-old sister Katherine due to tuberculosis. Before long, however, Hazel was moved once again but this time to the only government funded boarding school in the state of Washington: Tulalip Indian School. The school was located too far for a daily commute and, aside from the summers, became Hazel's temporary home. Though in disrepair and without inadequate funding, Tulalip introduced Hazel to a higher level of education and a deeper appreciation for practical skills. She learned how to sew everything from bed sheets to dresses and went on to work in the bakery and laundry. Hazel consistently improved in her studies from year to year and achieved the highest ranking in her class during her final year at the school. Upon completion of the ninth grade in May 1929, Hazel had graduated with honors and was prepared for another move (Collins 2001, p. 17–18).

Hazel completed her high school education at Chemawa Indian School in Salem, Oregon. She thrived there as well, making sure that she focused on her grades and finishing with excellence. She was also inspired to become a nurse in her junior year—a desire that she began working towards. While it was not known at the time, the most meaningful element of Hazel's enrollment at Chemawa was a class she attended on Indian arts and crafts in her senior year. She was introduced to working with various materials and learned a significant amount about beading, leather, and basketry. She took to these skills so well that she was awarded a medal for the most talented artist at the school. Ironically though, Her new-found intent to become a nurse gave this award little meaning when she received it. Hazel finished her high school education on May 26, 1932, after her official graduation from Chemawa Indian School (Collins 2001, p. 19–20).

Hazel Pete's hopes of becoming a nurse were quickly undone when she made her first inquiry at St. Joseph Hospital in Tacoma, WA. Regardless of her strong academic record, She was rejected on the basis of her skin color by the head supervisor. This experience removed any interest in becoming a nurse and instead gave her a desire to go back to school. Advisers from Chemawa recalled her natural talent in the arts and recommended that she pursue the field further at the Santa Fe Indian School in New Mexico. This school, designed for high school graduates, served as a place of preservation for Native American culture and understanding and was therefore the perfect environment for Pete to grow in her artistic ability. Pete was once again recognized for her distinct skills in the arts and was encouraged by her professors to continue cultivating her talents. She attended Santa Fe from 1932 to 1934—graduating on May 29 of that year. (Collins 2001, p. 21–22)

Below is a quote from Pete regarding her experience at Santa Fe:

I learned more about Indian culture than my parents knew. When I went to Santa Fe, I knew nothing about Indians. We weren't allowed to even think about being Indian. We were supposed to get out of [school] and be like the whites. So when I was there, I didn't realize that [native] baskets were a great craft. I didn't know that our woodwork, our totem poles, were unique and really different from [those of] other tribes. I didn't know the difference. So when I was there, I had to go to the books and learn about baskets and all the rituals that we had. (Collins 2001, p. 22)

It was not until the 1970s that Pete finally completed her academic endeavors. With her children out of the house and independent, she was freed up to pursue two college degrees: a Bachelor of Arts from the Evergreen State College in Olympia (1974) and a Master of Arts in Native American studies from the University of Washington (1978). She was in her 60s at the time (Collins 2001, p. 26).

== Marital life ==
There is not a great deal of information available on the marital life of Pete but what is known is that she married Joseph DuPuis and was remarried to Frank Richardson. She mothered a total of thirteen children. Six have already died but her other children include Janet Camp, Curtis DuPuis, Yvonne Peterson, Trudy Marcellay, Henrietta Boyd, Donna DuPuis, and David DuPuis.

== Basket weaving ==
At some point along the way and with her artistic skills and training in mind, Pete's mother suggested that she take up basket making. Pete agreed. She remembered watching her grandmother make them decades earlier and utilized this memory to reintroduce the ancestral methodology of basket weaving to the Chehalis people once again. Though it had nearly been forgotten, Pete reinvigorated Chehalis artistry by opening an art studio and workshop in her own house. She went on to create the Hazel Pete Institute of Chehalis Basketry through which she taught her children and grandchildren her unique trade. Her business was so successful that it assisted in paying college tuition for many of her relatives (Collins 2001, p. 25).

Major galleries across America have shown Hazel Pete's work and have given her national recognition as a result. Two of these include the American Indian Community House Museum in New York City and the Burke Museum of National History and Culture in Seattle, WA (Collins 2001, p. 25). One of her baskets can be seen online at My Public Art Portal for Washington's State Art Collection.

== Career ==
In 1934, Pete was given a teaching position by the BIA (Bureau of Indian Affairs) at Warm Springs Indian School in Oregon. There, she served as an instructor of Indian Arts and Crafts. 1937 brought Pete to a new school located in Riverside, California: the Sherman Institute. In 1940, she went on to teach at Carson City Indian School in Nevada. (Collins 2001. p. 22–23)

Later in life, Pete was employed by the Grays Harbor Community College in Aberdeen, WA to teach a class in Indian studies (Collins 2001, p. 26).

== Awards ==
In 2001, Pete was chosen to receive the most renowned honor available in the state of Washington for artists: the Governor's Heritage Award. This prize was created in 1966 and has been awarded to 51 individuals and organizations since that time. It is intended to identify and commend exceptional artists and artistic endeavors for their contributions to the state. Pete was given her award by Governor Gary Locke.

Pete also won the award of Master Artist through the Washington State Arts Commission Folk Arts Program in seven years earlier in 1994.

== Death ==
At the age of 88, Hazel Pete died on January 2, 2003, in Oakville, Washington. She is buried at the Chehalis Tribal Cemetery.

== Legacy ==
Hazel Pete worked on the preservation and restoration of Chehalis culture and traditions. She also helped promote basket weaving, which was later featured in museums.
