= Aaroh (disambiguation) =

Aaroh is an alternative rock band from Karachi, Sindh, Pakistan.

Aaroh, Aroh, Aroha, Aaroha or Arohana may also refer to:

- Arohana, the ascending scale of notes in a raga
- Association for Advancement & Rehabilitation of Handicapped (AAROH), a charitable society in Delhi, India
- AROH Foundation, a non-governmental organization
