= Malone, Washington =

- Census-designated place
- Location of Malone in Washington
- Coordinates: 46°59′40″N 123°15′18″W
- Country: United States
- State: Washington
- County: Grays Harbor

Area
  - Total: 9.05 sq mi (23.43 km^{2})
  - Land: 9.04 sq mi (23.42 km^{2})
  - Water: 0.0039 sq mi (0.01 km^{2})
- Elevation: 299 ft (91 m)

Population (2020)
  - Total: 468
  - Density: 51.8/sq mi (20.0/km^{2})
- Time zone: UTC-8 (Pacific (PST))
  - Summer (DST): UTC-7 (PDT)
- ZIP Code: 98559
- Area code(s): 360, 564
- FIPS code: 53-42345
- GNIS feature ID: 2633137

Malone is an unincorporated community and census-designated place (CDP) in Grays Harbor County, Washington, United States. The population was 468 at the 2020 census. Prior to 2010 it was part of the Malone-Porter CDP; Malone and Porter are now separate CDPs. They are located just off U.S. Route 12, southeast of Elma and northwest of Oakville, and along a shortline that is part of the Puget Sound and Pacific Railroad.

== Geography ==
Malone is located in southeastern Grays Harbor County, east of the Chehalis River valley. It is bordered to the southeast by the Porter CDP and to the southwest by U.S. Route 12, which leads west 25 miles (40 km) to Aberdeen and southeast 21 miles (34 km) to Grand Mound and Interstate 5.

According to the United States Census Bureau, the Malone CDP has a total area of 9.0 square miles (23.4 km^{2}), of which 0.004 square miles (0.01 km^{2}), or 0.06%, are water.

Malone is the home of Red's Hop N' Market, a mini-mart that is also the U.S. Postal Service's (USPS) first official village post office, a post office located within an existing retail establishment, with limited service and no full-time postmaster. The mini-mart's owner is paid $2,000/year by the US Postal Service to sell stamps and shipping supplies and allow the USPS to place mailboxes on-site.

== Demographics ==
Historical population
Census	Pop.	Note	%±
2010	475		—
2020	468		−1.5%
U.S. Decennial Census; 1990 2000 2010

Malone first appeared as a census designated place in the 2010 U.S. census formed from part of deleted Malone-Porter CDP.

=== Racial and ethnic composition ===
Malone CDP, Washington – Racial and ethnic composition Note: the US Census treats Hispanic/Latino as an ethnic category. This table excludes Latinos from the racial categories and assigns them to a separate category. Hispanics/Latinos may be of any race.
Race / Ethnicity (NH = Non-Hispanic)	Pop 2010	Pop 2020	% 2010	% 2020
White alone (NH)	433	397	91.16%	84.83%
Black or African American alone (NH)	0	0	0.00%	0.00%
Native American or Alaska Native alone (NH)	9	3	1.89%	0.64%
Asian alone (NH)	1	4	0.21%	0.85%
Native Hawaiian or Pacific Islander alone (NH)	0	0	0.00%	0.00%
Other race alone (NH)	0	0	0.00%	0.00%
Mixed race or Multiracial (NH)	20	34	4.21%	7.26%
Hispanic or Latino (any race)	12	30	2.53%	6.41%
Total	475	468	100.00%	100.00%

== Education ==
The community is served by the Elma School District.
