= Humptulips River =

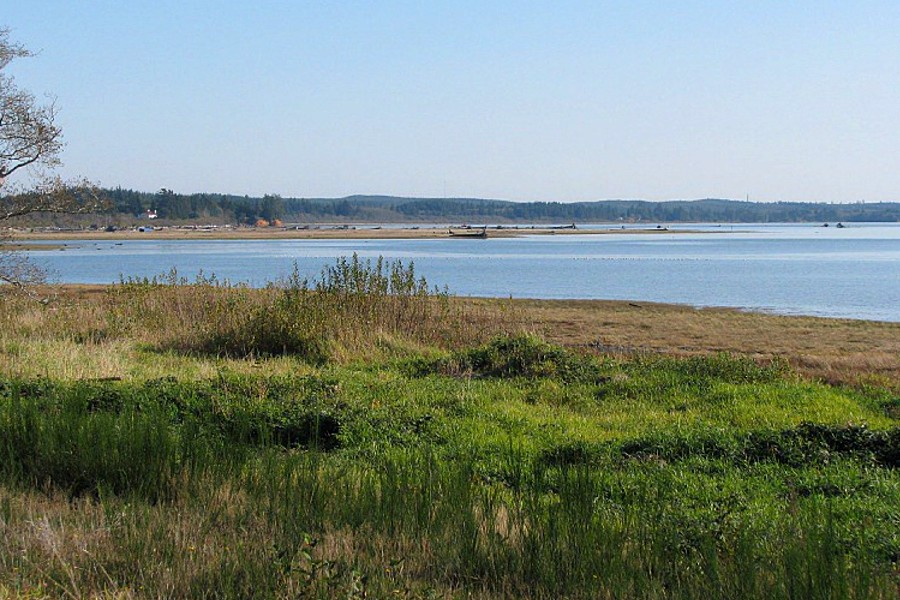
- Mouth of the Humptulips River at Grays Harbor

- Mouth of the Humptulips River in Washington

Location
- Country: United States
- State: Washington

Physical characteristics
- Source: Olympic Mountains
- Mouth: Pacific Ocean
  - location: Copalis Crossing
  - coordinates: 47°2′28″N 124°3′16″W
- Length: 50 mi (80 km)
- Basin size: 276 sq mi (710 km^{2})
- Discharge
  - average: 1,344 cu ft/s (38.1 m^{3}/s)
  - minimum: 82 cu ft/s (2.3 m^{3}/s)
  - maximum: 37,500 cu ft/s (1,060 m^{3}/s)

The Humptulips River is a river in Grays Harbor County, Washington, in the United States. Its main tributaries are the East Fork Humptulips River, about 20 miles (32 km) long (32 km), and West Fork Humptulips River, about 30 miles (48 km) long (48 km). After the forks join, the main river is approximately 20 miles (32 km) long.

The Humptulips has a drainage basin of 276 square miles (710 km^{2}). The river's average discharge is 1,344 cu ft/s (38.1 m^{3}/s), with a maximum recorded discharge of 37,500 cu ft/s (1,060 m^{3}/s), in November, 2006, and a minimum of 82 cu ft/s (2.3 m^{3}/s), in September, 1944.

Variant names, according to the United States Geological Survey (USGS), include Hum-tu-lups, Humptolups, Humtutup, and Um-ta-lah. The name comes from the Humptulips Indians, part of the Chehalis tribe. Some sources say the word "humptulips" means "hard to pole" while others say it means "chilly region".

== Course ==
The Humptulips River originates in the Olympic National Forest in the East Fork and West Fork. This region of Olympic Peninsula receives around 220 inches (5,600 mm) of precipitation annually, feeding many streams. The forks are separated by Humptulips Ridge. The West Fork is separated from the Quinault River by Quinault Ridge, while the East Fork is separated from the Wynoochee River by Fitzgerald Peak.

Flowing south and southwest, the forks exit the mountains, merging about 4.5 miles (7.2 km) above the town of Humptulips. Near the town the river is crossed by U.S. Route 101. The Humptulips Salmon Hatchery is located just below the town, at the mouth of Stevens Creek, a tributary of the Humptulips River. After the hatchery, the river turns south, flowing the last few miles before its mouth at North Bay of Grays Harbor, which empties into the Pacific Ocean. There are two small towns near the river's mouth, Copalis Crossing and Tulips.

Although the Chehalis River ends when it flows into Grays Harbor as well, the Humptulips is sometimes considered the westernmost tributary of the Chehalis system, when Grays Harbor is considered part of the system.

== Natural history ==
The Humptulips East Fork area has been logged. Most of the land in the river's drainage basin is commercial forest. There are some areas of pasture and cropland as well. In the upper drainage basin there are 88 square miles (230 km^{2}) within the Olympic National Forest. The Humptulip River's headwaters are managed by the Olympic National Park.

About 30 splash dams, used for log driving, were built on the river. These dams decimated the native salmon runs. Several salmon hatcheries have been built in an attempt to mitigate the damage.

== Cities and towns ==
Humptulips, Copalis Crossing, and Tulips are small towns located along the Humptulips River. The nearest cities are Hoquiam and Aberdeen, located at the mouth of the Chehalis River on Grays Harbor.

== See also ==
- List of rivers of Washington (state)
