= Grays Harbor Light =

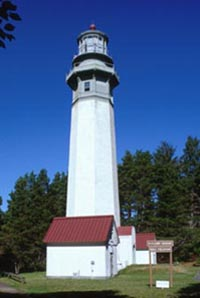
- Location: Westport, Washington, United States
- Coordinates: 46.8883°N 124.1170°W

Tower
- Foundation: Sandstone
- Construction: Brick and concrete
- Automated: 1960s
- Height: 107 feet (33 m)
- Shape: Octagonal
- Heritage: National Register of Historic Places listed place

Light
- First lit: 1898
- Focal height: 37 m (121 ft)
- Lens: Third order Fresnel lens
- Range: 19 miles (17 nmi; 31 km)
- Characteristic: Alternating red and white every 15 s
- Grays Harbor Light Station
- U.S. National Register of Historic Places
- Nearest city: Westport, Washington
- Area: 1 acre (0.40 ha)
- Built: 1897–98
- Built by: Erickson, C.S.
- Architect: Leick, Carl W.
- Architectural style: Late Victorian: Italianate
- NRHP reference No.: 77001333
- Added to NRHP: November 2, 1977

The Grays Harbor Lighthouse (Westport Light) is a lighthouse located on Point Chehalis on the southern side of the entrance to Grays Harbor, Westport, Grays Harbor County, Washington, in the United States.

== History ==
The 107-foot (33 m) Grays Harbor Lighthouse is the tallest lighthouse in Washington and the third tallest on the West Coast. It marks the entrance to Grays Harbor, which is one of Washington's few outer-coast harbors, and was first lit in 1898. Construction began in 1897, using plans drawn up by architect Carl Leick, at a site facing the Pacific Ocean about 400 feet (120 m) from water's edge. Massive amounts of accretion, due in large part to the jetty system at the entrance to Grays Harbor, have since built up, and the lighthouse now stands approximately 3,000 feet (910 m) from high tide.

The base of the lighthouse rests on a 12-foot-thick (3.7 m) foundation of sandstone. The lighthouse walls, which are four feet thick at the base, are made of brick with a coating of cement on the exterior. Originally windows lit the interior of the tower, but to cut down on maintenance they were cemented over when electricity was added to the station. One hundred thirty-five (135) metal stairs bolted to the wall lead to the lantern room.

The light's initial signature was a five-second white flash, darkness, then a five-second red flash. After electricity reached the lighthouse, the signature became white flashes followed by 15 seconds of darkness, then red flashes followed by 15 seconds of darkness. In August 1992, the original third order Fresnel lens was turned off. A smaller light (FA-251), manufactured in New Zealand, was mounted to the balcony. The new light operates on a 35 watt bulb and can be seen 19 miles (17 nmi; 31 km) with the white sector, 17 on the red sector. The original lens still occupies the lantern room.

In late 1960s, the Coast Guard automated the light. In 1977, the lighthouse achieved listing on the National Register of Historic Places. In 2004, under the National Historic Lighthouse Preservation Act of 2000, ownership was transferred to the Westport-South Beach Historical Society, which conducts regular tours. The light station is adjacent to Westport Light State Park.
