= Qui-nai-elt Village, Washington =

- Census-designated place
- Location within Washington (state) Location within the United States
- Coordinates: 47°14′56″N 124°11′25″W
- Country: United States
- State: Washington
- County: Grays Harbor

Area
  - Total: 0.73 sq mi (1.90 km^{2})
  - Land: 0.73 sq mi (1.90 km^{2})
  - Water: 0 sq mi (0.0 km^{2})
- Elevation: 262 ft (80 m)

Population (2020)
  - Total: 320
  - Density: 440/sq mi (170/km^{2})
- Time zone: UTC-8 (Pacific (PST))
  - Summer (DST): UTC-7 (PDT)
- ZIP Code: 98587
- Area code(s): 360, 564
- FIPS code: 53-57030
- GNIS feature ID: 2585027

Qui-nai-elt Village is a census-designated place (CDP) in Grays Harbor County, Washington, United States. The population was 320 at the 2020 census, significantly up from 54 at the 2010 census.

The community is in the southwestern part of the Quinault Indian Nation in western Grays Harbor County, about 2 miles (3 km) east of the Pacific Ocean. It is bordered to the south by the community of Moclips. The Moclips Highway runs past the village, leading southwest to Moclips and northeast 19 miles (31 km) to U.S. Route 101 near Neilton.

== Demographics ==
Historical population
Census	Pop.	Note	%±
2010	54		—
2020	320		492.6%
U.S. Decennial Census; 2000 2010

Qui-nai-elt Village first appeared as a census designated place in the 2010 U.S. census.

=== Racial and ethnic composition ===
Qui-nai-elt Village CDP, Washington – Racial and ethnic composition Note: the US Census treats Hispanic/Latino as an ethnic category. This table excludes Latinos from the racial categories and assigns them to a separate category. Hispanics/Latinos may be of any race.
Race / Ethnicity (NH = Non-Hispanic)	Pop 2010	Pop 2020	% 2010	% 2020
White alone (NH)	3	18	5.56%	5.63%
Black or African American alone (NH)	0	0	0.00%	0.00%
Native American or Alaska Native alone (NH)	42	274	77.78%	85.63%
Asian alone (NH)	0	0	0.00%	0.00%
Native Hawaiian or Pacific Islander alone (NH)	0	0	0.00%	0.00%
Other race alone (NH)	0	0	0.00%	0.00%
Mixed race or Multiracial (NH)	7	11	12.96%	3.44%
Hispanic or Latino (any race)	2	17	3.70%	5.31%
Total	54	320	100.00%	100.00%

=== 2020 census ===
As of the 2020 census, there were 320 people, 77 housing units, and 17 families in the CDP. There were 18 White people, 0 African Americans, 280 Native Americans, 9 people from some other race, and 13 people from two or more races. 17 people were of Hispanic or Latino origin.

The median age was 52.5 years old. 10.2% of the population spoke Spanish at home. 22.4% of the population were older than 65, 10.2% from 65 to 74, and 12.2% from 75 to 84.

The median household income was $87,917, with families having $53,750. 0.0% of the population were in poverty.

== Education ==
The community is served by the Taholah School District.
