= Sine, Washington =

Unincorporated community in Washington, US

- Unincorporated community
- Location within Washington (state) Location within the United States
- Coordinates: 47°01′53″N 123°15′53″W
- Country: United States
- State: Washington
- County: Grays Harbor
- Established: 1905
- Elevation: 259 ft (79 m)
- Time zone: UTC-8 (Pacific (PST))
  - Summer (DST): UTC-7 (PDT)
- Area code(s): 360, 564
- GNIS feature ID: 1511317

Sine is an unincorporated community in Grays Harbor County, in the U.S. state of Washington.

== History ==
A post office called Sine was established in 1905, and remained in operation until 1910. The community has the name of Jackson Sine, an early settler.
