= Newton, Washington =

Unincorporated community in Washington, US

- Unincorporated community
- Location within Washington (state) Location within the United States
- Coordinates: 47°04′52″N 124°03′20″W
- Country: United States
- State: Washington
- County: Grays Harbor
- Named: 1906
- Elevation: 26 ft (8 m)
- Time zone: UTC-8 (Pacific (PST))
  - Summer (DST): UTC-7 (PDT)
- Area code(s): 360, 564
- GNIS feature ID: 1511183

Newton is an unincorporated community in Grays Harbor County, in the U.S. state of Washington.

== History ==
Newton was so named in 1906. A post office was established in 1908 and remained in operation until 1919.
