= Whites, Washington =

Unincorporated community in Washington, US

- Unincorporated community
- Location within Washington (state) Location within the United States
- Coordinates: 47°02′21″N 123°20′13″W
- Country: United States
- State: Washington
- County: Grays Harbor
- Established: 1913
- Time zone: UTC-8 (Pacific (PST))
  - Summer (DST): UTC-7 (PDT)
- Area code(s): 360, 564
- GNIS feature ID: 1513240

Whites is an unincorporated community in Grays Harbor County, in the U.S. state of Washington.

== History ==
A post office called Whites was established in 1913, and remained in operation until 1949. The community was named after Allen White, the proprietor of a local sawmill.
