= Westhaven State Park =

Former state park in Washington, US

Westhaven State Park was a 79-acre (32 ha) public recreation area in Grays Harbor County, Washington. The park's acreage was subsumed into the expanded Westport Light State Park in 2016.
