= Aroha =

- Gender: Female or male
- Language: Māori

Origin
- Meaning: "love"

Aroha is a Māori word meaning "love", cognate with the Hawaiian term aloha. It is also a given name, and can be either masculine or feminine.

== Notable people ==
Notable people with the name include:

- Aroha Awarau (1976–2026), journalist and playwright from New Zealand
- Aroha Clifford, first woman in New Zealand to gain a pilot's license from an aero club
- Aroha Harris (born 1963), New Zealand historian
- Te Aroha Keenan, New Zealand former netball coach
- Aroha Reriti-Crofts (1938–2022), New Zealand community worker, national president of the Māori Women's Welfare League
- Aroha Savage (born 1990), rugby union player from New Zealand
- Aroha Yates-Smith, New Zealand performer

== Fictional characters ==
- Aroha Reed, character in the TVNZ soap opera Shortland Street

== Other uses ==
- Aroha is an alternate spelling for Hindi language word Aaroh.
- Aroha is the name for the fans of the kpop group Astro (South Korean band).

== See also ==
- Te Aroha, a town in the North Island of New Zealand
