= Neilton, Washington =

- Census-designated place
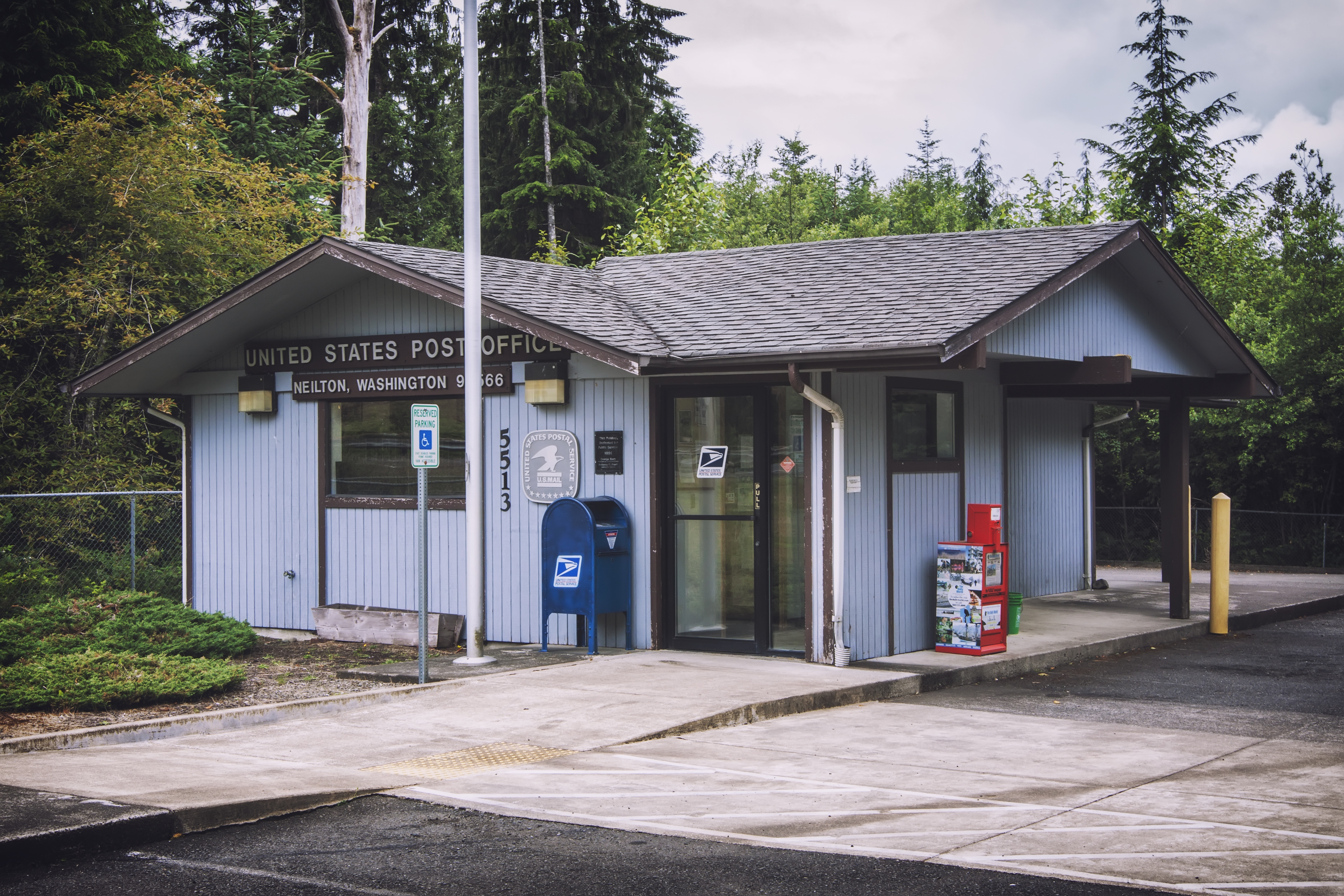
- Post office in Neilton

- Location of Neilton, Washington
- Coordinates: 47°24′16″N 123°52′14″W
- Country: United States
- State: Washington
- County: Grays Harbor

Area
  - Total: 9.7 sq mi (25.0 km^{2})
  - Land: 9.7 sq mi (25.0 km^{2})
  - Water: 0 sq mi (0.0 km^{2})
- Elevation: 604 ft (184 m)

Population (2020)
  - Total: 299
  - Density: 31.0/sq mi (12.0/km^{2})
- Time zone: UTC-8 (Pacific (PST))
  - Summer (DST): UTC-7 (PDT)
- ZIP Code: 98566
- Area code(s): 360, 564
- FIPS code: 53-48330
- GNIS feature ID: 2408910

Neilton is an unincorporated community and census-designated place (CDP) in Grays Harbor County, Washington, United States. The population was 299 at the 2020 census, down from 315 at the 2010 census.

== Geography ==
Neilton is located in northern Grays Harbor County within Olympic National Forest along U.S. Route 101. The CDP extends north along US 101 to Boulder Creek and south to Cook Creek, while to the east it runs to the 2,654-foot (809 m) crest of Quinault Ridge. US 101 leads north 4 miles (6 km) to Amanda Park and south 14 miles (23 km) to Humptulips. Aberdeen is 39 miles (63 km) to the south on US 101, and Queets is 29 miles (47 km) to the northwest.

According to the United States Census Bureau, the Neilton CDP has a total area of 9.7 square miles (25.0 km^{2}), all of it land.

=== Climate ===
The climate in this area has mild differences between highs and lows, and there is adequate rainfall year-round. According to the Köppen Climate Classification system, Neilton has a marine west coast climate, abbreviated "Cfb" on climate maps.

== Demographics ==
Historical population
Census	Pop.	Note	%±
2000	345		—
2010	315		−8.7%
2020	299		−5.1%
U.S. Decennial Census; 1990 2000 2010

Neilton first appeared as a census designated place in the 2000 U.S. census.

=== Racial and ethnic composition ===
Neilton CDP, Washington – Racial and ethnic composition Note: the US Census treats Hispanic/Latino as an ethnic category. This table excludes Latinos from the racial categories and assigns them to a separate category. Hispanics/Latinos may be of any race.
Race / Ethnicity (NH = Non-Hispanic)	Pop 2000	Pop 2010	Pop 2020	% 2000	% 2010	% 2020
White alone (NH)	303	219	184	87.83%	69.52%	61.54%
Black or African American alone (NH)	0	1	1	0.00%	0.32%	0.33%
Native American or Alaska Native alone (NH)	14	17	20	4.06%	5.40%	6.69%
Asian alone (NH)	0	0	0	0.00%	0.00%	0.00%
Native Hawaiian or Pacific Islander alone (NH)	0	0	2	0.00%	0.00%	0.67%
Other race alone (NH)	0	0	2	0.00%	0.00%	0.67%
Mixed race or Multiracial (NH)	7	17	12	2.03%	5.40%	4.01%
Hispanic or Latino (any race)	21	61	78	6.09%	19.37%	26.09%
Total	345	315	299	100.00%	100.00%	100.00%

=== 2000 census ===
As of the census of 2000, there were 345 people, 128 households, and 96 families residing in the CDP. The population density was 35.8 people per square mile (13.8/km^{2}). There were 138 housing units at an average density of 14.3/sq mi (5.5/km^{2}). The racial makeup of the CDP was 88.41% White, 4.35% Native American, 5.22% from other races, and 2.03% from two or more races. Hispanic or Latino of any race were 6.09% of the population.

There were 128 households, out of which 40.6% had children under the age of 18 living with them, 64.8% were married couples living together, 4.7% had a female householder with no husband present, and 25.0% were non-families. 19.5% of all households were made up of individuals, and 8.6% had someone living alone who was 65 years of age or older. The average household size was 2.70 and the average family size was 3.06.

In the CDP, the population was spread out, with 29.0% under the age of 18, 6.7% from 18 to 24, 25.2% from 25 to 44, 27.2% from 45 to 64, and 11.9% who were 65 years of age or older. The median age was 38 years. For every 100 females, there were 111.7 males. For every 100 females age 18 and over, there were 100.8 males.

The median income for a household in the CDP was $35,250, and the median income for a family was $44,375. Males had a median income of $30,781 versus $26,250 for females. The per capita income for the CDP was $15,856. About 5.6% of families and 8.0% of the population were below the poverty line, including 7.8% of those under age 18 and none of those age 65 or over.

== Education ==
The community is served by the Lake Quinault School District.
