= Nisson, Washington =

Unincorporated community in Washington, US

- Unincorporated community
- Location within Washington (state) Location within the United States
- Coordinates: 47°06′57″N 123°48′33″W
- Country: United States
- State: Washington
- County: Grays Harbor
- Established: 1912
- Elevation: 125 ft (38 m)
- Time zone: UTC-8 (Pacific (PST))
  - Summer (DST): UTC-7 (PDT)
- Area code(s): 360, 564
- GNIS feature ID: 1513021

Nisson is an unincorporated community in Grays Harbor County, in the U.S. state of Washington.

== History ==
A post office called Nisson was established in 1912, and remained in operation until 1917. The community was named after a pioneer lumberman.
