= Westport Light State Park =

State park in the U.S. state of Washington

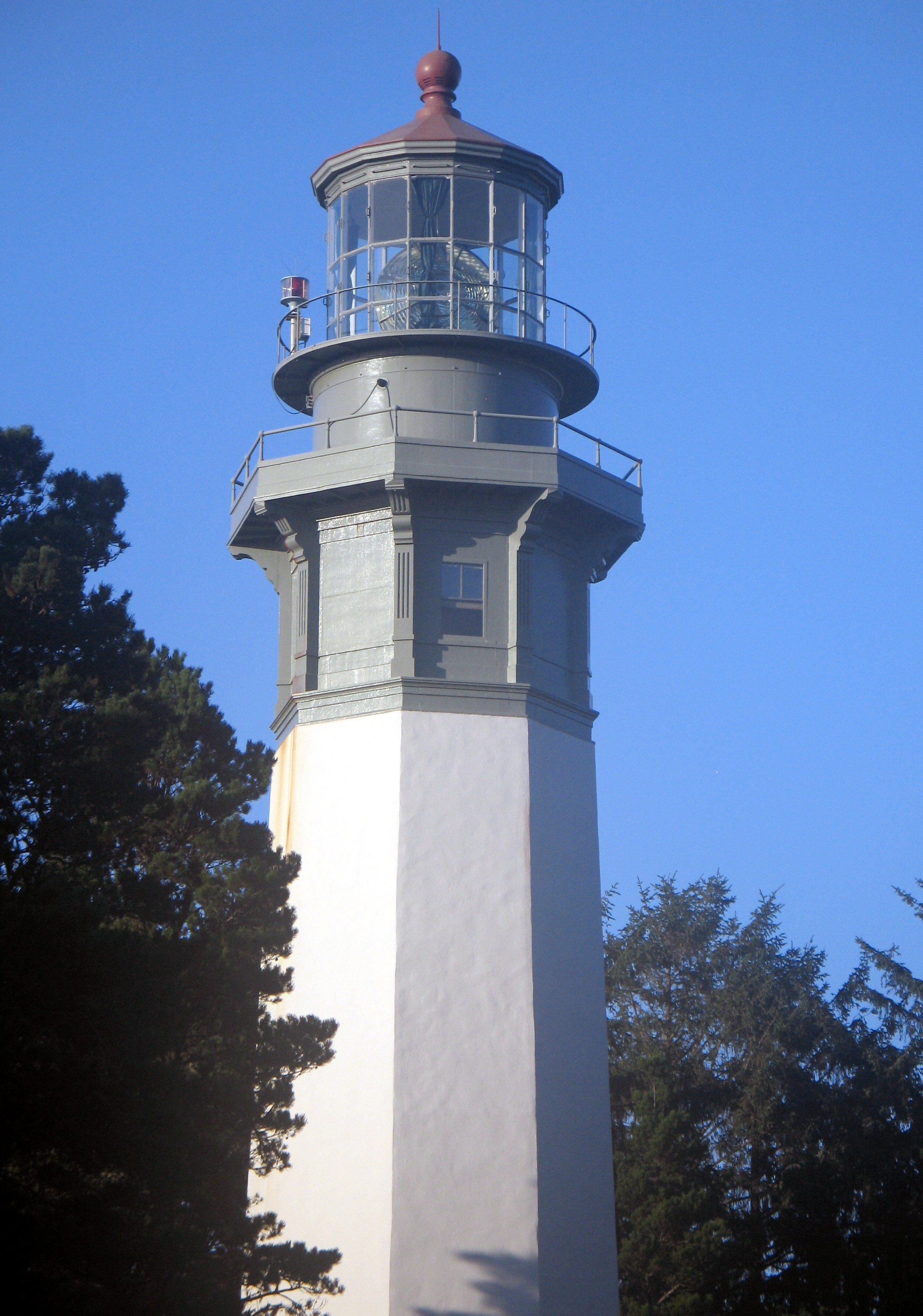
- The Westport Light sits adjacent to the park on U.S. Coast Guard land

- Location within Washington (state) Location within the United States
- Location: Grays Harbor County, Washington, United States
- Coordinates: 46°53′34″N 124°07′25″W
- Area: 560 acres (230 ha)
- Elevation: 13 ft (4.0 m)
- Established: 1968
- Administrator: Washington State Parks and Recreation Commission
- Website: Official website

Westport Light State Park is a public recreation area of 560 acres (230 ha) on the Pacific Ocean in Grays Harbor County, Washington. It sits adjacent to the historic Grays Harbor Light, the tallest lighthouse in Washington. Park activities include hiking, fishing, beachcombing, and birdwatching.

The park was combined with the former Westhaven State Park and an additional 270-acre (110 ha) parcel that had been under development as a golf course since 2016. The proposed 18-hole links golf course would be developed by a private company under a long-term lease and concession agreement with the state government. In 2026, the State Parks and Recreation Commission vetoed the golf course proposal due to its environmental impacts.
