= Vesta, Washington =

Unincorporated community in Washington, US

- Unincorporated community
- Location within Washington (state) Location within the United States
- Coordinates: 46°49′59″N 123°35′20″W
- Country: United States
- State: Washington
- County: Grays Harbor
- Established: 1892
- Elevation: 157 ft (48 m)
- Time zone: UTC-8 (Pacific (PST))
  - Summer (DST): UTC-7 (PDT)
- Area code(s): 360, 564
- GNIS feature ID: 1511396

Vesta is an unincorporated community in Grays Harbor County, in the U.S. state of Washington.

== History ==
A post office called Vesta was established in 1892, and remained in operation until 1936. The community was named after Vesta Dwinelle, the wife of a local pioneer.
