= Junction City, Washington =

- Former Census-designated place
- Location of Junction City, Washington
- Coordinates: 46°58′26″N 123°45′32″W
- Country: United States
- State: Washington
- County: Grays Harbor

Area
  - Total: 1.61 sq mi (4.16 km^{2})
  - Land: 1.42 sq mi (3.67 km^{2})
  - Water: 0.19 sq mi (0.50 km^{2})
- Elevation: 10 ft (3.0 m)

Population (2010)
  - Total: 18
  - Density: 13/sq mi (4.9/km^{2})
- Time zone: UTC-8 (Pacific (PST))
  - Summer (DST): UTC-7 (PDT)
- ZIP Code: 98520
- Area code(s): 360, 564
- FIPS code: 53-34470
- GNIS feature ID: 2408456

Junction City was a census-designated place (CDP) in Grays Harbor County, Washington, United States. The population was 18 at the 2010 census.

== Geography ==
Junction City is located in south-central Grays Harbor County and is bordered to the west by the city of Aberdeen and to the south by the city of Cosmopolis. The CDP is on low ground in the valley of the Chehalis River, between the Chehalis to the west and Elliott Slough to the northeast. U.S. Route 12 runs along the northern edge of the CDP, leading west into Aberdeen and east 18 miles (29 km) to Elma. Olympia is 49 miles (79 km) to the east of Junction City via U.S. 12 and State Route 8.

According to the United States Census Bureau, the Junction City CDP has a total area of 1.6 square miles (4.2 km^{2}), of which 1.4 square miles (3.7 km^{2}) are land and 0.2 square miles (0.5 km^{2}), or 11.92%, are water.

== Demographics ==
Historical population
Census	Pop.	Note	%±
2000	80		—
2010	18		−77.5%
U.S. Decennial Census; 1990 2000 2010

Junction City first appeared as a census designated place in the 2000 U.S. census. The CDP was deleted prior to the 2020 U.S. census.

=== Racial and ethnic composition ===
Junction City CDP, Washington – Racial and ethnic composition Note: the US Census treats Hispanic/Latino as an ethnic category. This table excludes Latinos from the racial categories and assigns them to a separate category. Hispanics/Latinos may be of any race.
Race / Ethnicity (NH = Non-Hispanic)	Pop 2000	Pop 2010	% 2000	% 2010
White alone (NH)	76	6	95.00%	33.33%
Black or African American alone (NH)	0	4	0.00%	22.22%
Native American or Alaska Native alone (NH)	0	0	0.00%	0.00%
Asian alone (NH)	0	1	0.00%	5.56%
Native Hawaiian or Pacific Islander alone (NH)	0	0	0.00%	0.00%
Other race alone (NH)	0	1	0.00%	5.56%
Mixed race or Multiracial (NH)	3	0	3.75%	0.00%
Hispanic or Latino (any race)	1	6	1.25%	33.33%
Total	80	18	100.00%	100.00%

=== 2000 census ===
As of the census of 2000, there were 80 people, 36 households, and 23 families residing in the CDP. The population density was 45.9 people per square mile (17.8/km^{2}). There were 38 housing units at an average density of 21.8/sq mi (8.4/km^{2}). The racial makeup of the CDP was 95.00% White, 1.25% from other races, and 3.75% from two or more races. Hispanic or Latino of any race were 1.25% of the population.

There were 36 households, out of which 16.7% had children under the age of 18 living with them, 47.2% were married couples living together, 8.3% had a female householder with no husband present, and 36.1% were non-families. 33.3% of all households were made up of individuals, and 11.1% had someone living alone who was 65 years of age or older. The average household size was 2.22 and the average family size was 2.70.

In the CDP, the population was spread out, with 16.3% under the age of 18, 1.3% from 18 to 24, 32.5% from 25 to 44, 31.3% from 45 to 64, and 18.8% who were 65 years of age or older. The median age was 45 years. For every 100 females, there were 142.4 males. For every 100 females age 18 and over, there were 148.1 males.

The median income for a household in the CDP was $32,292, and the median income for a family was $37,813. Males had a median income of $29,688 versus $21,250 for females. The per capita income for the CDP was $16,895. There were no families and 22.1% of the population living below the poverty line, including no under eighteens and none of those over 64.
