= Porter, Washington =

- Census-designated place
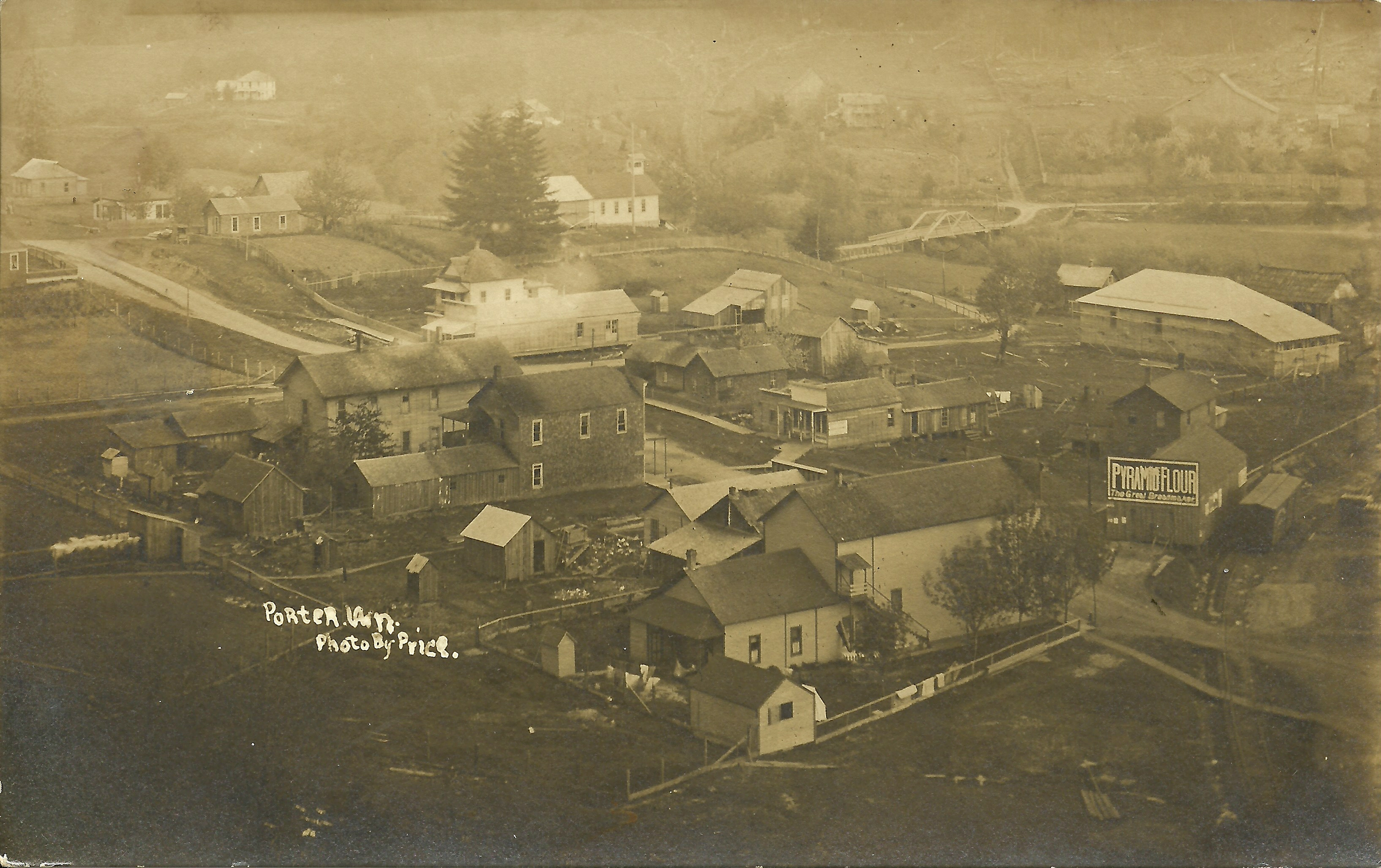
- Porter, Washington, early 20th century

- Location within Washington (state) Location within the United States
- Coordinates: 46°57′18″N 123°15′32″W
- Country: United States
- State: Washington
- County: Grays Harbor

Area
  - Total: 8.9 sq mi (23.0 km^{2})
  - Land: 8.9 sq mi (23.0 km^{2})
  - Water: 0 sq mi (0.0 km^{2})
- Elevation: 492 ft (150 m)

Population (2020)
  - Total: 204
  - Density: 23.0/sq mi (8.87/km^{2})
- Time zone: UTC-8 (Pacific (PST))
  - Summer (DST): UTC-7 (PDT)
- ZIP Code: 98541
- Area code(s): 360, 564
- FIPS code: 53-55540
- GNIS feature ID: 2585019

Porter is an unincorporated community and census-designated place (CDP) in Grays Harbor County, Washington, United States. The population was 204 at the 2020 census, slightly down from 207 at the 2010 census. Prior to 2010 it was part of the Malone-Porter CDP; Malone and Porter are now separate CDPs. They are located just off U.S. Route 12, southeast of Elma and northwest of Oakville, and along a shortline that is part of the Puget Sound and Pacific Railroad.

== History ==
Porter was named after Fairchild Porter, who settled in the area around 1860. The Sharon Grange, located in Oakville, began in the Porter community as the Porter Grange No. 800 in 1923.

Much of Porter was destroyed by fire on January 31, 1924. Porter Saloon was re-built later that same year. When it re-opened in 1933 following the repeal of Prohibition, it was one of the first establishments to receive a liquor license in the state of Washington.

== Geography ==
Porter is located in southeastern Grays Harbor County, east of the Chehalis River valley near the mouth of Porter Creek. The CDP extends northeast up the Porter Creek valley and east to the first ridgecrest of the local Black Hills. It is bordered to the northwest by the Malone CDP and to the west by U.S. Route 12, which leads west 27 miles (43 km) to Aberdeen and southeast 19 miles (31 km) to Grand Mound and Interstate 5.

According to the United States Census Bureau, the Porter CDP has a total area of 8.9 square miles (23.0 km^{2}), all of it land.

== Demographics ==
Historical population
Census	Pop.	Note	%±
2010	207		—
2020	204		−1.4%
U.S. Decennial Census; 2000 2010

Porter first appeared as a census designated place in the 2010 U.S. census formed from part of the deleted Malone-Porter CDP and additional area.

=== Racial and ethnic composition ===
Porter CDP, Washington – Racial and ethnic composition Note: the US Census treats Hispanic/Latino as an ethnic category. This table excludes Latinos from the racial categories and assigns them to a separate category. Hispanics/Latinos may be of any race.
Race / Ethnicity (NH = Non-Hispanic)	Pop 2010	Pop 2020	% 2010	% 2020
White alone (NH)	189	176	91.30%	86.27%
Black or African American alone (NH)	4	1	1.93%	0.49%
Native American or Alaska Native alone (NH)	3	3	1.45%	1.47%
Asian alone (NH)	0	3	0.00%	1.47%
Native Hawaiian or Pacific Islander alone (NH)	1	1	0.48%	0.49%
Other race alone (NH)	0	1	0.00%	0.49%
Mixed race or Multiracial (NH)	1	10	0.48%	4.90%
Hispanic or Latino (any race)	9	9	4.35%	4.41%
Total	207	204	100.00%	100.00%

== Education ==
Primary and secondary education in Elma is provided by the Elma School District.
