= Copalis Crossing, Washington =

Unincorporated community in Washington, United States

- Unincorporated community
- Location within Washington (state) Location within the United States
- Coordinates: 47°06′28″N 124°04′10″W
- Country: United States
- State: Washington
- County: Grays Harbor
- Elevation: 79 ft (24 m)
- Time zone: UTC-8 (Pacific (PST))
  - Summer (DST): UTC-7 (PDT)
- ZIP Code: 98536
- Area code(s): 360, 564
- GNIS feature ID: 1512114

Copalis Crossing is an unincorporated community in Grays Harbor County, Washington, United States. Copalis Crossing is 5 miles (8.0 km) east of Copalis Beach. Copalis Crossing has a post office with ZIP Code 98536.
