= Aloha, Washington =

Unincorporated community in Washington, US

- Unincorporated community
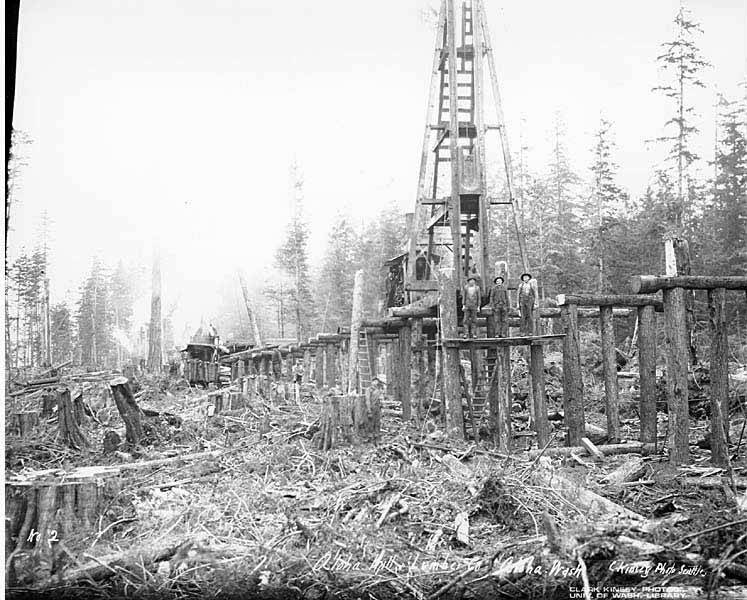
- Railroad trestle of Aloha Mill & Lumber Company, c. 1921

- Location within Washington (state) Location within the United States
- Coordinates: 47°12′03″N 124°10′05″W
- Country: United States
- State: Washington
- County: Grays Harbor
- Elevation: 59 ft (18 m)
- Time zone: UTC-8 (Pacific (PST))
  - Summer (DST): UTC-7 (PDT)
- Area code(s): 360, 564
- GNIS feature ID: 1511961

Aloha is an unincorporated community in Grays Harbor County, in the U.S. state of Washington. It is located two miles east of the Pacific Ocean at Beaver Creek in west central Grays Harbor County.

== History ==
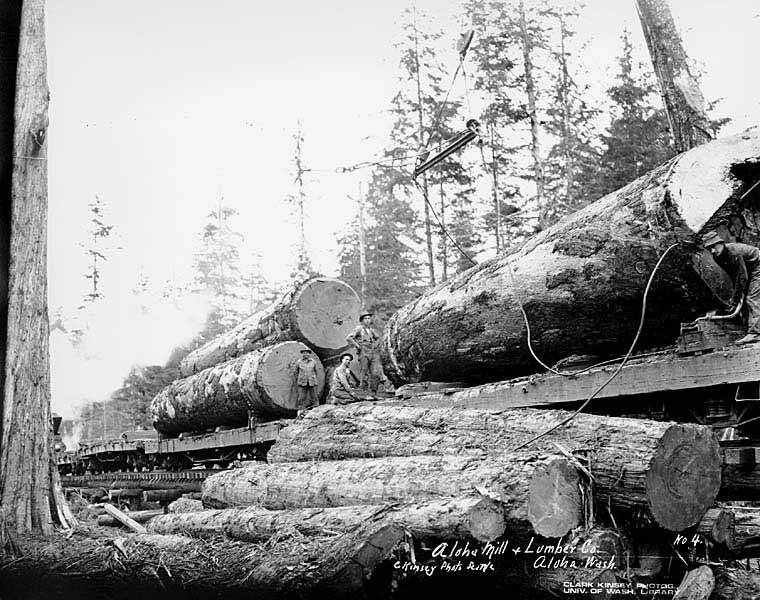
Logging crew of Aloha Mill & Lumber Company loading logs onto railroad cars, c. 1921

The community was named after the Hawaiian-language word aloha. The name may have been inspired by the song "Aloha ʻOe".

Aloha was once home to Aloha Mill & Lumber Company. It was founded by R. D. Emerson and W. H. Dole in 1905. The name, a Hawaiian greeting, was chosen by members of the Dole family, who were landowners and business people in Hawaii. In 1920, Aloha Mill & Lumber Co. successfully bid on a unit of timber near Moclips, six miles away from its mill. For the next two years the company toiled at constructing a railroad to the sale site. Heavy rains during the winter months, 25 to 30 inches a month, delayed the start of logging until the summer of 1922.
