= Aloha (crater) =

Crater on the Moon

- Coordinates: 29.8°N 53.9°W
- Diameter: 2.55 km
- Depth: Unknown
- Colongitude: 54° at sunrise
- Eponym: A Hawaiian female name

Aloha is a tiny, horseshoe-shaped impact crater on the Moon. It lies to the northwest of the Montes Agricola ridge, on the Oceanus Procellarum. The crater is located near the faint terminus of a ray that crosses the mare from the southeast, originating at the crater Glushko. The female name Aloha is Hawaiian in origin and was formally adopted by the International Astronomical Union in 1976.
