= AROH Foundation =

Indian NGO

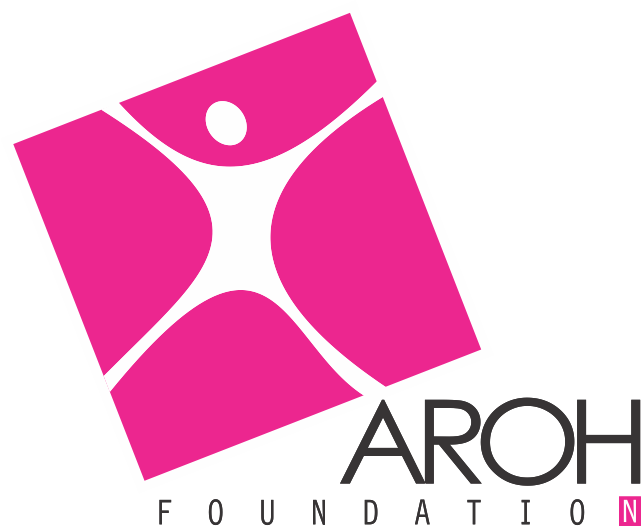
- Founded: 2001
- Founder: Neelam Gupta
- Type: Non-Governmental Organisation
- Purpose: Education, Health, Sanitation, Livelihood, Natural resource management, Renewable Energy
- Location: Noida, Uttar Pradesh, India
- Region served: India
- Method: Donations and Grants
- Website: www.aroh.in

AROH Foundation is a national-level Indian non-governmental organization founded in 2001 by Dr. Neelam Gupta. Focused on sustainable development, the foundation works across key sectors including education, healthcare, sanitation, livelihood promotion, natural resource management, and renewable energy.

== Work ==
AROH has been working on various initiatives toward 'women empowerment' Holistic Rural Development Skill & Livelihood Generation, Health & Sanitation and Water & Natural Resource Management in 18 states of India.
