= Operation Aloha =

Operation Aloha may refer to:

- Operation Aloha, a coalition military operation of the Iraq War
- Operation Aloha (album), 2009, the only album released by the supergroup Operation Aloha
