= Humptulips, Washington =

- CDP
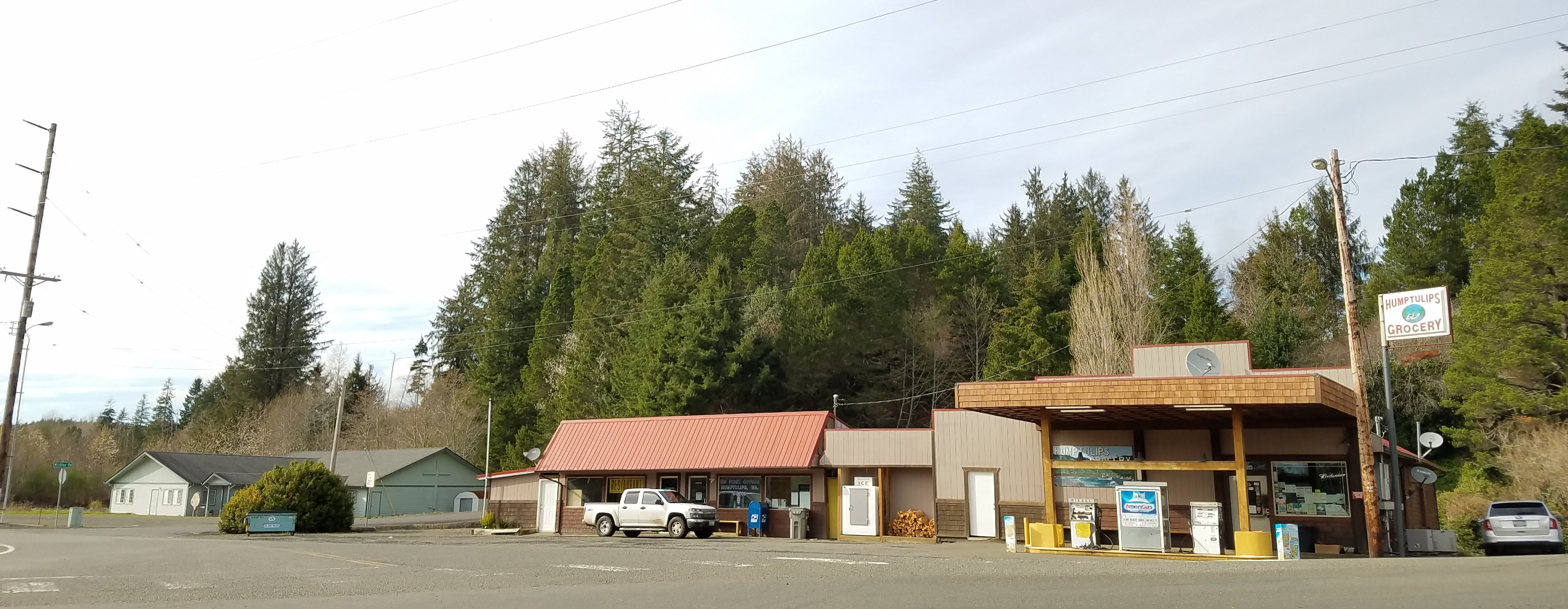
- Humptulips grocery store and post office

- Location of Humptulips, Washington
- Coordinates: 47°13′54″N 123°58′5″W
- Country: United States
- State: Washington
- County: Grays Harbor

Area
  - Total: 9.5 sq mi (24.6 km^{2})
  - Land: 9.3 sq mi (24.1 km^{2})
  - Water: 0.15 sq mi (0.4 km^{2})
- Elevation: 171 ft (52 m)

Population (2020)
  - Total: 236
  - Density: 25/sq mi (9.8/km^{2})
- Time zone: UTC-8 (Pacific (PST))
  - Summer (DST): UTC-7 (PDT)
- ZIP Code: 98552
- Area code(s): 360, 564
- FIPS code: 53-32650
- GNIS feature ID: 2408407

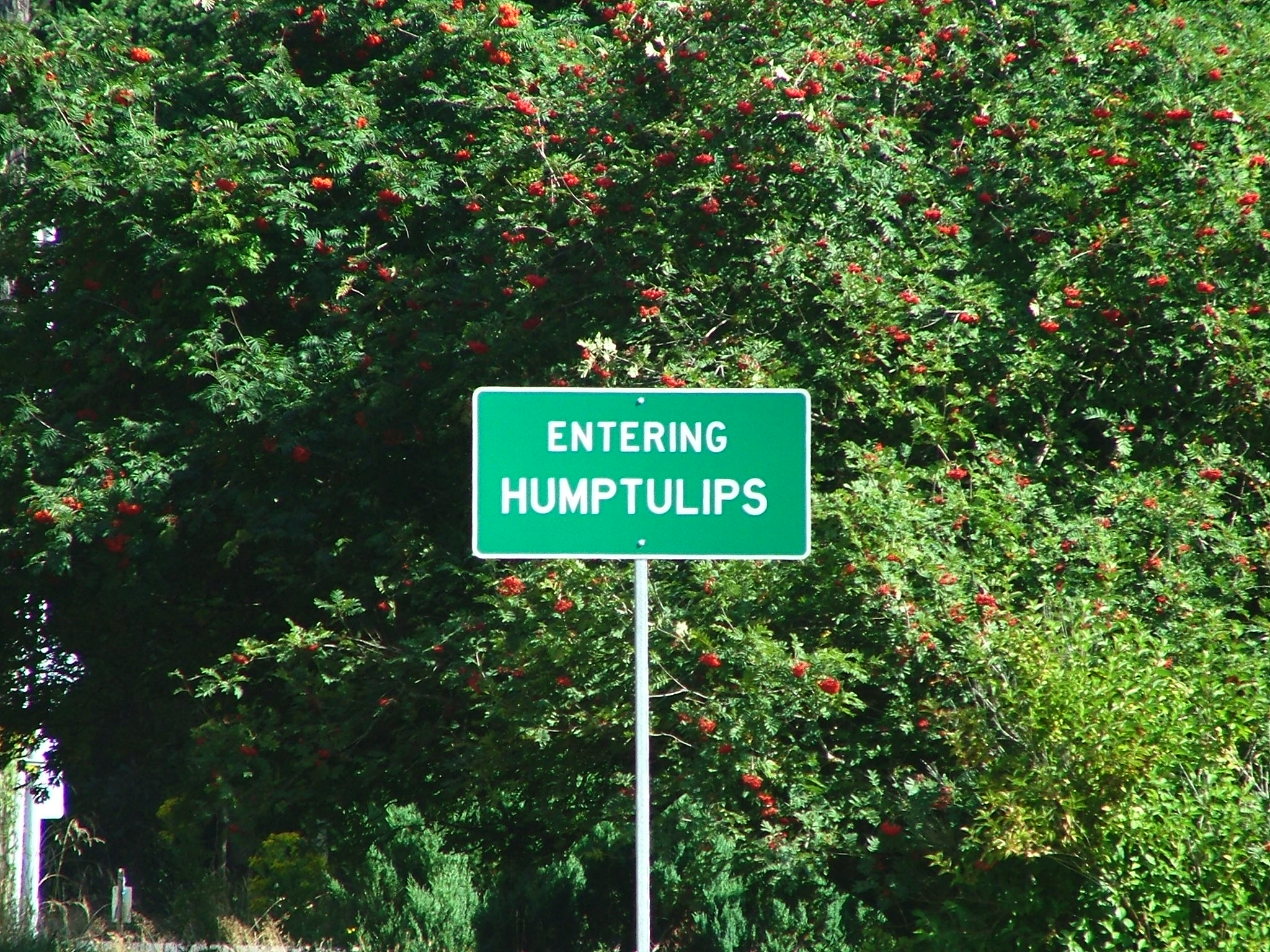
A sign designating the area

Humptulips is a census-designated place (CDP) in Grays Harbor County, Washington, United States. The population of the CDP was 236 according to the 2020 census.

== Etymology ==
The name Humptulips was the name of a band of the Chehalis tribe who lived in the area. The name comes from a local Native American language, meaning 'hard to pole', referring to the difficulty local Native Americans had poling their canoes along the Humptulips River. According to other sources the word means 'chilly region'. It has frequently been noted on lists of unusual place names.

== Geography ==
Humptulips is located on the Humptulips River and is within the Lake Quinault school district boundary.

=== Climate ===
Humptulips is in a temperate rain forest. The climate in this area has mild differences between highs and lows, and there is adequate rainfall year-round. According to the Köppen Climate Classification system, Humptulips has a marine west coast climate, abbreviated "Cfb" on climate maps.

Climate data for Humptulips Salmon Hatchery, Washington, 1991–2020 normals, extremes 1987–present
| Month | Jan | Feb | Mar | Apr | May | Jun | Jul | Aug | Sep | Oct | Nov | Dec | Year |
|---|---|---|---|---|---|---|---|---|---|---|---|---|---|
| Record high °F (°C) | 63 (17) | 73 (23) | 78 (26) | 84 (29) | 93 (34) | 95 (35) | 97 (36) | 96 (36) | 101 (38) | 89 (32) | 67 (19) | 73 (23) | 101 (38) |
| Mean maximum °F (°C) | 55.1 (12.8) | 59.8 (15.4) | 65.3 (18.5) | 72.8 (22.7) | 81.4 (27.4) | 82.9 (28.3) | 86.5 (30.3) | 87.4 (30.8) | 83.4 (28.6) | 71.7 (22.1) | 59.0 (15.0) | 54.6 (12.6) | 91.1 (32.8) |
| Mean daily maximum °F (°C) | 45.4 (7.4) | 47.5 (8.6) | 51.2 (10.7) | 55.1 (12.8) | 61.3 (16.3) | 64.4 (18.0) | 69.4 (20.8) | 70.3 (21.3) | 67.0 (19.4) | 57.9 (14.4) | 49.3 (9.6) | 44.4 (6.9) | 56.9 (13.8) |
| Daily mean °F (°C) | 40.0 (4.4) | 40.6 (4.8) | 43.0 (6.1) | 46.3 (7.9) | 51.8 (11.0) | 55.6 (13.1) | 59.6 (15.3) | 60.1 (15.6) | 56.7 (13.7) | 49.4 (9.7) | 42.8 (6.0) | 39.1 (3.9) | 48.8 (9.3) |
| Mean daily minimum °F (°C) | 34.7 (1.5) | 33.6 (0.9) | 34.8 (1.6) | 37.5 (3.1) | 42.4 (5.8) | 46.9 (8.3) | 49.9 (9.9) | 50.0 (10.0) | 46.3 (7.9) | 40.9 (4.9) | 36.3 (2.4) | 33.7 (0.9) | 40.6 (4.8) |
| Mean minimum °F (°C) | 23.5 (−4.7) | 23.9 (−4.5) | 27.1 (−2.7) | 29.2 (−1.6) | 33.4 (0.8) | 38.9 (3.8) | 42.7 (5.9) | 42.8 (6.0) | 36.8 (2.7) | 30.0 (−1.1) | 26.0 (−3.3) | 24.7 (−4.1) | 20.1 (−6.6) |
| Record low °F (°C) | 11 (−12) | 4 (−16) | 21 (−6) | 25 (−4) | 28 (−2) | 32 (0) | 39 (4) | 38 (3) | 30 (−1) | 23 (−5) | 15 (−9) | 8 (−13) | 4 (−16) |
| Average precipitation inches (mm) | 18.69 (475) | 11.34 (288) | 13.23 (336) | 8.65 (220) | 4.54 (115) | 3.59 (91) | 1.62 (41) | 2.49 (63) | 4.56 (116) | 11.24 (285) | 18.30 (465) | 17.39 (442) | 115.64 (2,937) |
| Average snowfall inches (cm) | 0.5 (1.3) | 0.0 (0.0) | 0.0 (0.0) | 0.0 (0.0) | 0.0 (0.0) | 0.0 (0.0) | 0.0 (0.0) | 0.0 (0.0) | 0.0 (0.0) | 0.0 (0.0) | 0.1 (0.25) | 0.4 (1.0) | 1.0 (2.5) |
| Average precipitation days (≥ 0.01 in) | 20.5 | 16.5 | 20.4 | 16.9 | 11.7 | 11.2 | 6.2 | 6.4 | 9.7 | 15.7 | 19.7 | 20.3 | 175.2 |
| Average snowy days (≥ 0.1 in) | 0.3 | 0.2 | 0.1 | 0.0 | 0.0 | 0.0 | 0.0 | 0.0 | 0.0 | 0.0 | 0.2 | 0.2 | 1.0 |
Source: NOAA

== Demographics ==
Historical population
| Census | Pop. | Note | %± |
|---|---|---|---|
| 2000 | 216 | | — |
| 2010 | 255 | | 18.1% |
| 2020 | 236 | | −7.5% |
U.S. Decennial Census; 1990 2000 2010

Humptulips first appeared as a census designated place in the 2000 U.S. census.

=== Racial and ethnic composition ===
Humptulips CDP, Washington – Racial and ethnic composition Note: the US Census treats Hispanic/Latino as an ethnic category. This table excludes Latinos from the racial categories and assigns them to a separate category. Hispanics/Latinos may be of any race.
| Race / Ethnicity (NH = Non-Hispanic) | Pop 2000 | Pop 2010 | Pop 2020 | % 2000 | % 2010 | % 2020 |
|---|---|---|---|---|---|---|
| White alone (NH) | 168 | 160 | 131 | 77.78% | 62.75% | 55.51% |
| Black or African American alone (NH) | 0 | 0 | 0 | 0.00% | 0.00% | 0.00% |
| Native American or Alaska Native alone (NH) | 7 | 4 | 10 | 3.24% | 1.57% | 4.24% |
| Asian alone (NH) | 2 | 0 | 0 | 0.93% | 0.00% | 0.00% |
| Native Hawaiian or Pacific Islander alone (NH) | 0 | 0 | 0 | 0.00% | 0.00% | 0.00% |
| Other race alone (NH) | 0 | 0 | 0 | 0.00% | 0.00% | 0.00% |
| Mixed race or Multiracial (NH) | 9 | 7 | 22 | 4.17% | 2.75% | 9.32% |
| Hispanic or Latino (any race) | 30 | 84 | 73 | 13.89% | 32.94% | 30.93% |
| Total | 216 | 255 | 236 | 100.00% | 100.00% | 100.00% |

=== 2020 census ===
As of the 2020 census, there were 236 people, 101 housing units, and 80 families in the CDP. There were 154 White people, 10 Native Americans, 30 people from some other race, and 42 people were from two or more races. 73 people were from Hispanic or Latino origin.

The ancestry was 55.9% German, 42.4% Irish, 1.3% French, and 1.3% Norwegian.

The median age was 37.9 years. 24.9% of the population was older than 65, with 18.8% from the ages of 65 to 74, 5.2% from 75 to 84, and 0.9% from the ages older than 85.

41.5% of the population were in poverty. 65.7% of people under 18 were in poverty, 44.1% of people between the ages of 18 and 64 were in poverty, and 7.0% of people older than 65 were in poverty.

=== 2000 census ===
As of the census of 2000, there were 216 people, 81 households, and 60 families residing in the CDP. The population density was 22.8 people per square mile (8.8/km^{2}). There were 93 housing units at an average density of 9.8/sq mi (3.8/km^{2}). The racial makeup of the CDP was 79.17% White, 3.24% Native American, 0.93% Asian, 11.57% from other races, and 5.09% from two or more races. Hispanic or Latino of any race were 13.89% of the population.

There were 81 households, out of which 39.5% had children under the age of 18 living with them, 55.6% were married couples living together, 11.1% had a female householder with no husband present, and 24.7% were non-families. 16.0% of all households were made up of individuals, and 1.2% had someone living alone who was 65 years of age or older. The average household size was 2.67 and the average family size was 2.87.

In the CDP, the population was spread out, with 27.8% under the age of 18, 6.5% from 18 to 24, 29.2% from 25 to 44, 30.1% from 45 to 64, and 6.5% who were 65 years of age or older. The median age was 37 years. For every 100 females, there were 109.7 males. For every 100 females age 18 and over, there were 105.3 males.

The median income for a household in the CDP was $26,000, and the median income for a family was $22,188. Males had a median income of $38,125 versus $17,500 for females. The per capita income for the CDP was $10,210. About 26.9% of families and 32.7% of the population were below the poverty line, including 40.6% of those under the age of eighteen and 23.5% of those 65 or over.

== Education ==
The community is served by the Lake Quinault School District.
