= AAROH =

Indian charitable society founded in 1983

- Association for Advancement & Rehabilitation of Handicapped
- Abbreviation: AAROH
- Founded: 1983
- Founder: S C Gupta (Retd. Air Vice Marshal)
- Location: New Delhi, India
- Region served: India
- Website: AAROH

Association for Advancement & Rehabilitation of Handicapped (abbr.: AAROH) is an Indian charitable society founded in 1983 by a few committed citizens and affected parents of disabled children.

== History ==
Air Vice Marshal SC Gupta founded AAROH in 1983 and functioned as secretary AAROH until his untimely demise in 2004. Mrs. Asha Gupta co-founded AAROH/Navjyoti together with AVM SC Gupta in 1983.
