= Oakville, Washington =

City in Washington, United States

Oakville
- City
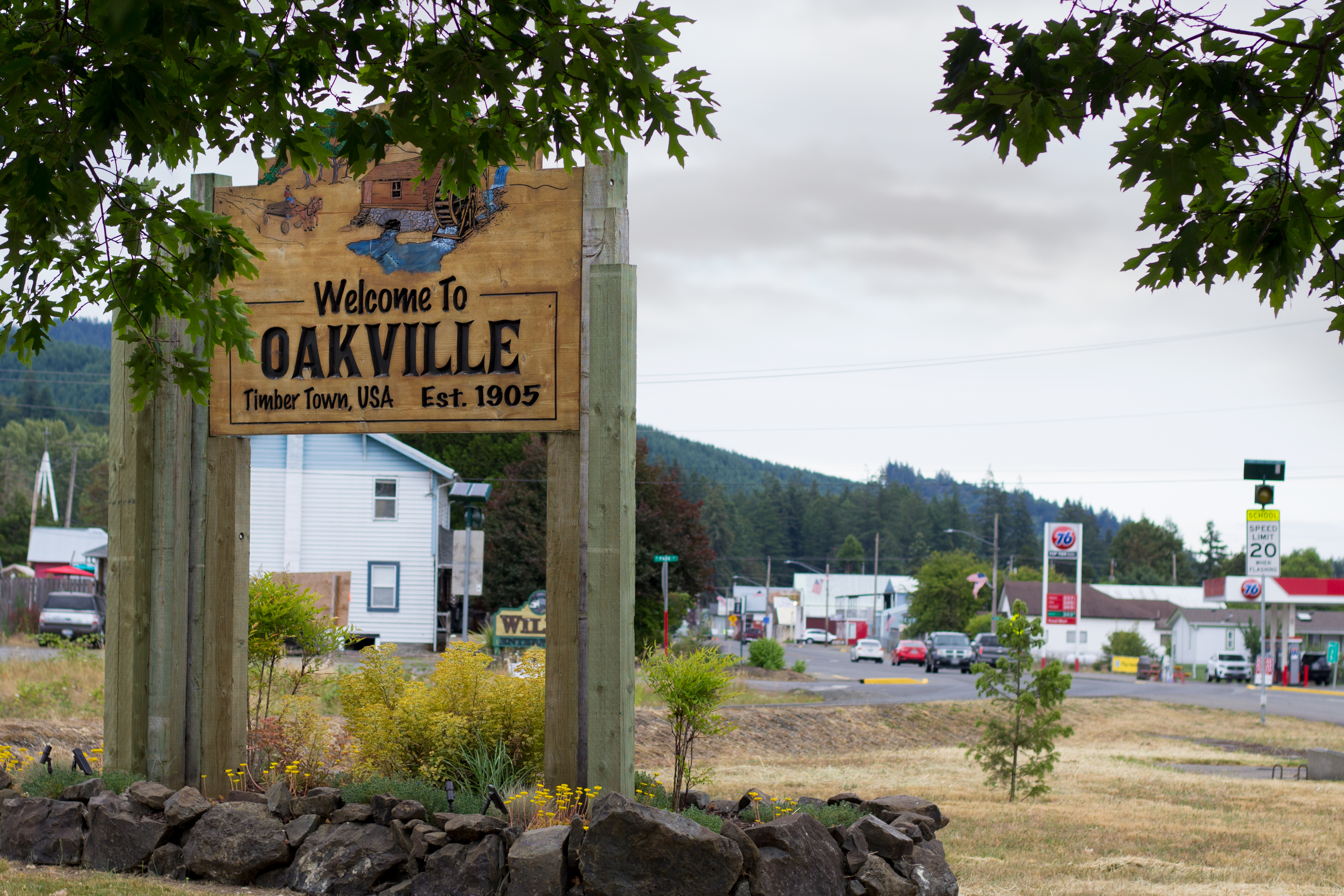
- Nickname: Timber Town, USA
- Location of Oakville, Washington
- Coordinates: 46°50′24″N 123°14′01″W
- Country: United States
- State: Washington
- County: Grays Harbor
- Established: December 18, 1905

Government
  - Type: Mayor–council
  - Mayor: Bill Breedlove

Area
  - Total: 0.55 sq mi (1.43 km^{2})
  - Land: 0.55 sq mi (1.43 km^{2})
  - Water: 0 sq mi (0.00 km^{2})
- Elevation: 92 ft (28 m)

Population (2020)
  - Total: 715
- Time zone: UTC-8 (Pacific (PST))
  - Summer (DST): UTC-7 (PDT)
- ZIP Code: 98568
- Area code(s): 360, 564
- FIPS code: 53-50430
- GNIS feature ID: 2411298
- Website: oakvillecityhall.com

Oakville is a city in Grays Harbor County, Washington, United States. It was incorporated in 1905, with booming lumber, railway, and farming industries creating the early foundation of the community. The population was 715 at the 2020 census.

== History ==
In 1818, the United States and Great Britain agreed to a treaty of joint occupancy in the Oregon Country, which included the land that would eventually become Oakville, Washington. Over the next several decades, citizens of the United States began to settle in the area. As traveling by boat was easier than moving through the dense forests, many used the river system, entering from the port of Grays Harbor and canoeing inland via the Chehalis River. The British government gave full ownership of the area to the United States in 1846.

In 1850, the land in the area was mainly open prairie, maintained by yearly fires started deliberately by local tribes, which kept the forest from encroaching and which encouraged the bloom of camas, a staple food, and other plants. The prairie lands were attractive to settlers arriving in the area, helped by the indigenous people, and towns began to be platted up and down the Chehalis River.

In the 1870s, a party of several families relocated to the area from Crawford County, Illinois. The leader of the party, James Reed Harris, had purchased the donation claim for the area from John Hole for $1200. He applied for a post office, and after some discussion, it was decided to use the name "Oakville," inspired by the Garry oak trees in the area. The post office opened on December 31, 1873.

Logging and railroad construction soon brought other settlers to the area; the plat of the city site was filed on September 27, 1887. Around 1890, Northern Pacific Railway was laying tracks through the city. By the turn of the century, a Northern Pacific train station had been established in the city, and the area had several general stores, a new school, and a couple of hotels. Oakville was officially incorporated on December 18, 1905.

In 1909, a report by the Railroad Commission of Washington described Oakville:

"Oakville is a town of about 400 inhabitants, located on the line of the Northern Pacific trailer in the center of an important lumbering and taking district. The timber resources of this section are of immense value and the bottom lands are well adapted to general farming. Oakville is a growing town and will develop more rapidly as the resources of the surrounding district are more thoroughly exploited."

Lumber was a major industry in the early days of the city; in 1916, Oakville Lumber Company, Big Fir Lumber Company, Vance Lumber Company, and others were in operation, along with the Callow Mill. The city was "noted for large shipments of cascara bark." Factories were also part of the city's economy, with the E.H. Hilton & Co. Oiled Clothes Factory in operation by 1915, and the Oakville Co-Operative Cheese Company incorporating a few years later.

The historic Oakville State Bank was incorporated on August 14, 1909 by C.R. Harper and C.C. Scates. The bank changed names and ownership several times over the next century. It is said to be the last bank in Washington to be robbed by a rider on horseback. Other businesses in the early days of the city included a jewelry store, a shoe company, and a hardware store.

The city's librarian Clara Trudgeon had been appointed by the State Traveling Library by 1908, making Oakville eligible to be a recipient of one of the 150 cases of books the state had in rotation. The weekly newspaper was The Oakville Cruiser. By 1919, the city had an active community center, and the high school had received accreditation as a four-year school.

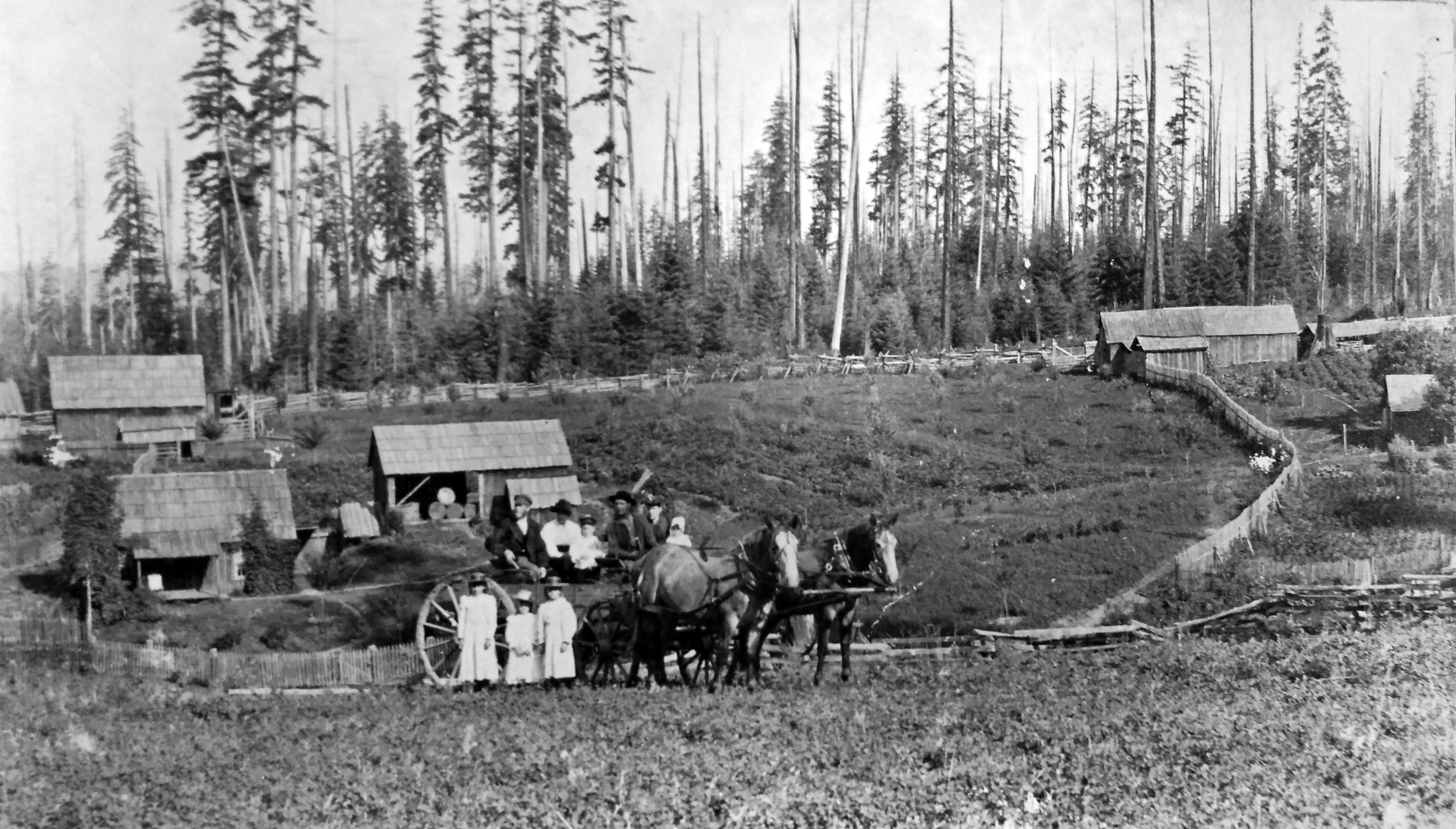
Settlers at their homestead on the west side of Oakville, circa 1890.

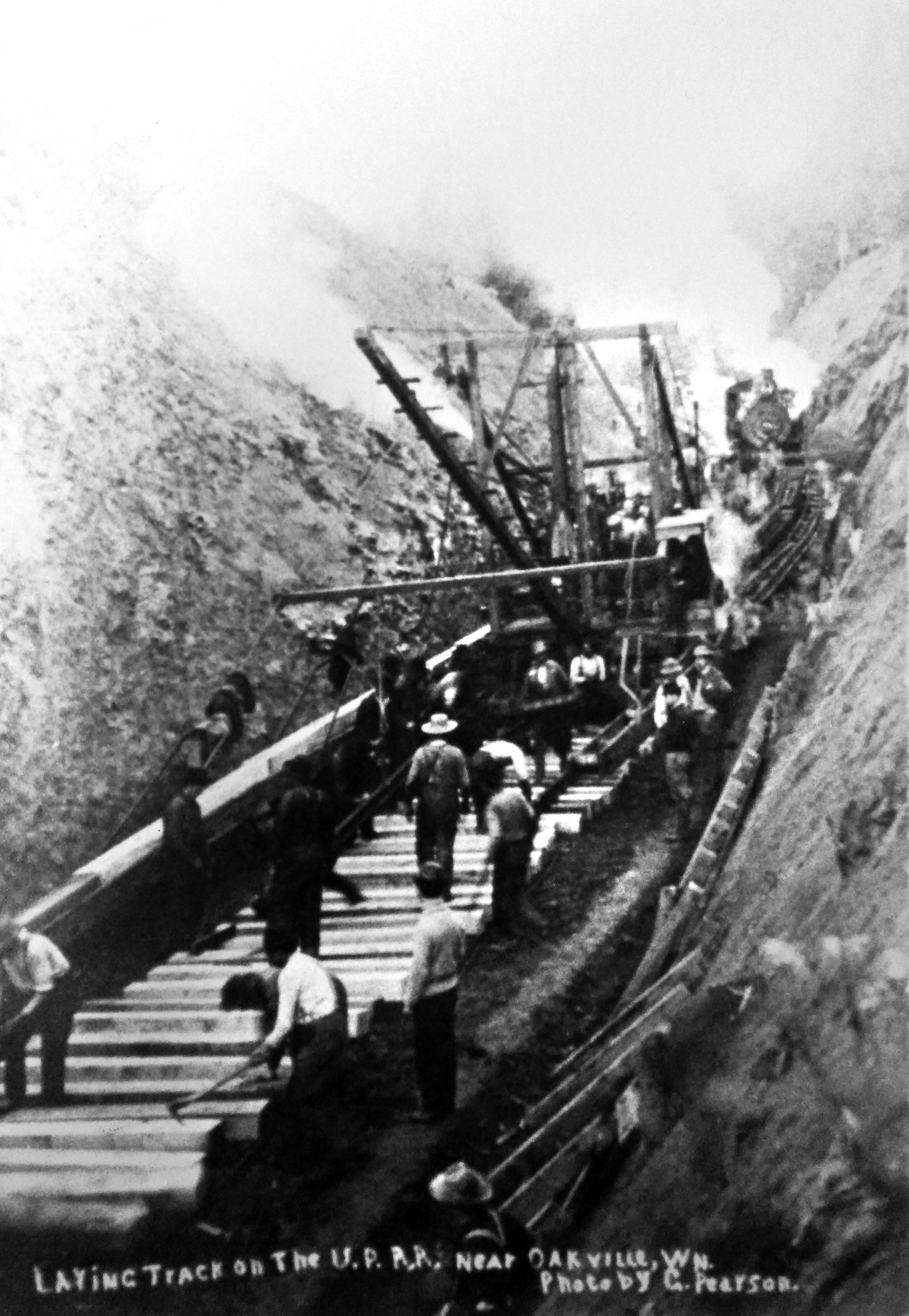
Track being laid for the railroad near Oakville, circa 1890.

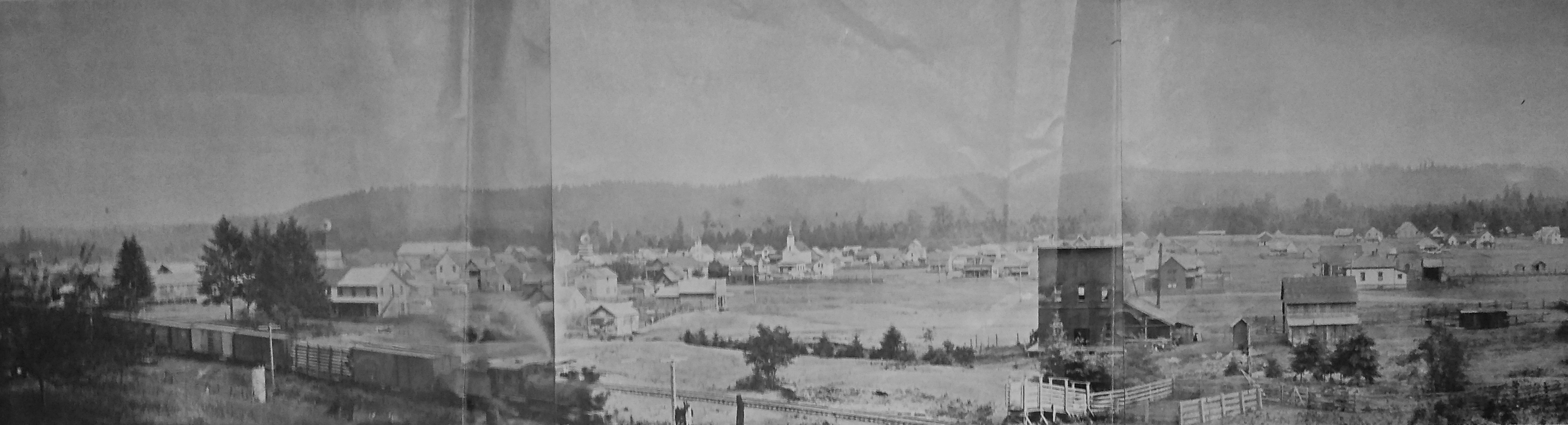
Oakville in 1906

=== Oakville blobs ===
On August 7, 1994, a resident reported that a translucent, gelatinous substance had rained down in the night; she expressed concern that it might have caused her and her mother to become ill, and speculated that it might have been the reason her kitten died. According to the resident, a hospital lab technician tested the substance, colloquially known as "Oakville blobs", and said that it contained human blood cells. However tests made by the Department of Ecology refuted these results, as tests showed that there were no nuclei present. Several theories were given by residents, including wondering whether the substance might have been waste from a commercial plane toilet or whether it may have been particles of deceased jellyfish that had evaporated and been incorporated into a rain cloud. The blobs were also found to contain two species of bacteria. There are no remaining testing samples of the blobs.

The incident received coverage in several media outlets, including The New York Times, and a segment was produced about the event for an episode of Unsolved Mysteries and Monsters and Mysteries in America.

In 2025, an additional instance of the blobs were documented in the neighboring town of Rochester. It was apparently identified as Polyacrylamide.

== Geography ==
According to the United States Census Bureau, the city has a total area of 0.50 square miles (1.29 km^{2}), all of it land.

Oakville is on the northern shore of the Chehalis River, just downstream from the convergence of the Chehalis and Black rivers. This is an area subject to annual flooding, with major floods occurring most recently in 2007 and 1996. Both of these floods were federally declared disasters due to the extensive damage to human life, livestock, and property in the region. In 2016, the Chehalis River Basin Flood Authority authorized $55,000 to be used to collect data, geography, and history on the flooding in the city, which reports indicated to be affecting approximately 35 homes and causing on average three road closures per event, with this flooding occurring typically twice a year.

To its north, Oakville is bordered by the hills of the Capitol State Forest. The area is filled with hills, valleys, rivers, and dense forests. The Chehalis apple, a possible Golden Delicious offshoot, was discovered near Oakville in 1937.

=== Climate ===
According to the Köppen Climate Classification system, Oakville has a warm-summer Mediterranean climate, abbreviated "Csb" on climate maps.

Climate data for Oakville
Month	Jan	Feb	Mar	Apr	May	Jun	Jul	Aug	Sep	Oct	Nov	Dec	Year
Record high °F (°C)	66 (19)	75 (24)	80 (27)	91 (33)	98 (37)	100 (38)	105 (41)	105 (41)	100 (38)	90 (32)	74 (23)	66 (19)	105 (41)
Mean daily maximum °F (°C)	45.3 (7.4)	49.7 (9.8)	54.2 (12.3)	60.1 (15.6)	66.5 (19.2)	71.5 (21.9)	77.1 (25.1)	77.3 (25.2)	72.4 (22.4)	62.1 (16.7)	51.8 (11.0)	45.9 (7.7)	61.2 (16.2)
Mean daily minimum °F (°C)	32.2 (0.1)	33.4 (0.8)	34.7 (1.5)	37.4 (3.0)	41.7 (5.4)	46.8 (8.2)	49.7 (9.8)	49.9 (9.9)	46.0 (7.8)	41.1 (5.1)	36.3 (2.4)	33.8 (1.0)	40.3 (4.6)
Record low °F (°C)	−8 (−22)	3 (−16)	13 (−11)	20 (−7)	22 (−6)	22 (−6)	33 (1)	25 (−4)	23 (−5)	16 (−9)	2 (−17)	−6 (−21)	−8 (−22)
Average precipitation inches (mm)	8.25 (210)	6.34 (161)	5.84 (148)	3.83 (97)	2.35 (60)	1.78 (45)	0.68 (17)	1.15 (29)	2.44 (62)	4.99 (127)	7.72 (196)	9.02 (229)	54.39 (1,382)
Average snowfall inches (cm)	3.2 (8.1)	0.9 (2.3)	0.8 (2.0)	0 (0)	0 (0)	0 (0)	0 (0)	0 (0)	0 (0)	0 (0)	0.3 (0.76)	1.4 (3.6)	6.6 (16.76)
Average precipitation days (≥ 0.01 inch)	18	15	17	14	11	8	4	5	8	13	18	19	150

== Demographics ==
Historical population
Census	Pop.	Note	%±
1910	465		—
1920	396		−14.8%
1930	469		18.4%
1940	418		−10.9%
1950	372		−11.0%
1960	377		1.3%
1970	460		22.0%
1980	537		16.7%
1990	493		−8.2%
2000	675		36.9%
2010	684		1.3%
2020	715		4.5%
U.S. Decennial Census; 2020 Census

=== 2020 census ===
As of the 2020 census, Oakville had a population of 715. The median age was 37.5 years. 25.7% of residents were under the age of 18 and 17.3% of residents were 65 years of age or older. For every 100 females there were 89.7 males, and for every 100 females age 18 and over there were 92.4 males age 18 and over.

0.0% of residents lived in urban areas, while 100.0% lived in rural areas.

There were 267 households in Oakville, of which 41.2% had children under the age of 18 living in them. Of all households, 40.1% were married-couple households, 18.7% were households with a male householder and no spouse or partner present, and 27.3% were households with a female householder and no spouse or partner present. About 20.6% of all households were made up of individuals and 8.9% had someone living alone who was 65 years of age or older.

There were 287 housing units, of which 7.0% were vacant. The homeowner vacancy rate was 3.4% and the rental vacancy rate was 1.4%.

Racial composition as of the 2020 census
Race	Number	Percent
White	515	72.0%
Black or African American	9	1.3%
American Indian and Alaska Native	89	12.4%
Asian	7	1.0%
Native Hawaiian and Other Pacific Islander	2	0.3%
Some other race	38	5.3%
Two or more races	55	7.7%
Hispanic or Latino (of any race)	65	9.1%

=== 2010 census ===
As of the 2010 census, there were 684 people, 260 households, and 176 families residing in the city. The population density was 1,368.0 inhabitants per square mile (528.2/km^{2}). There were 291 housing units at an average density of 582.0 per square mile (224.7/km^{2}). The racial makeup of the city was 86.5% White, 0.6% African American, 5.1% Native American, 0.9% Asian, 0.1% Pacific Islander, 4.1% from other races, and 2.6% from two or more races. Hispanic or Latino of any race were 6.6% of the population.

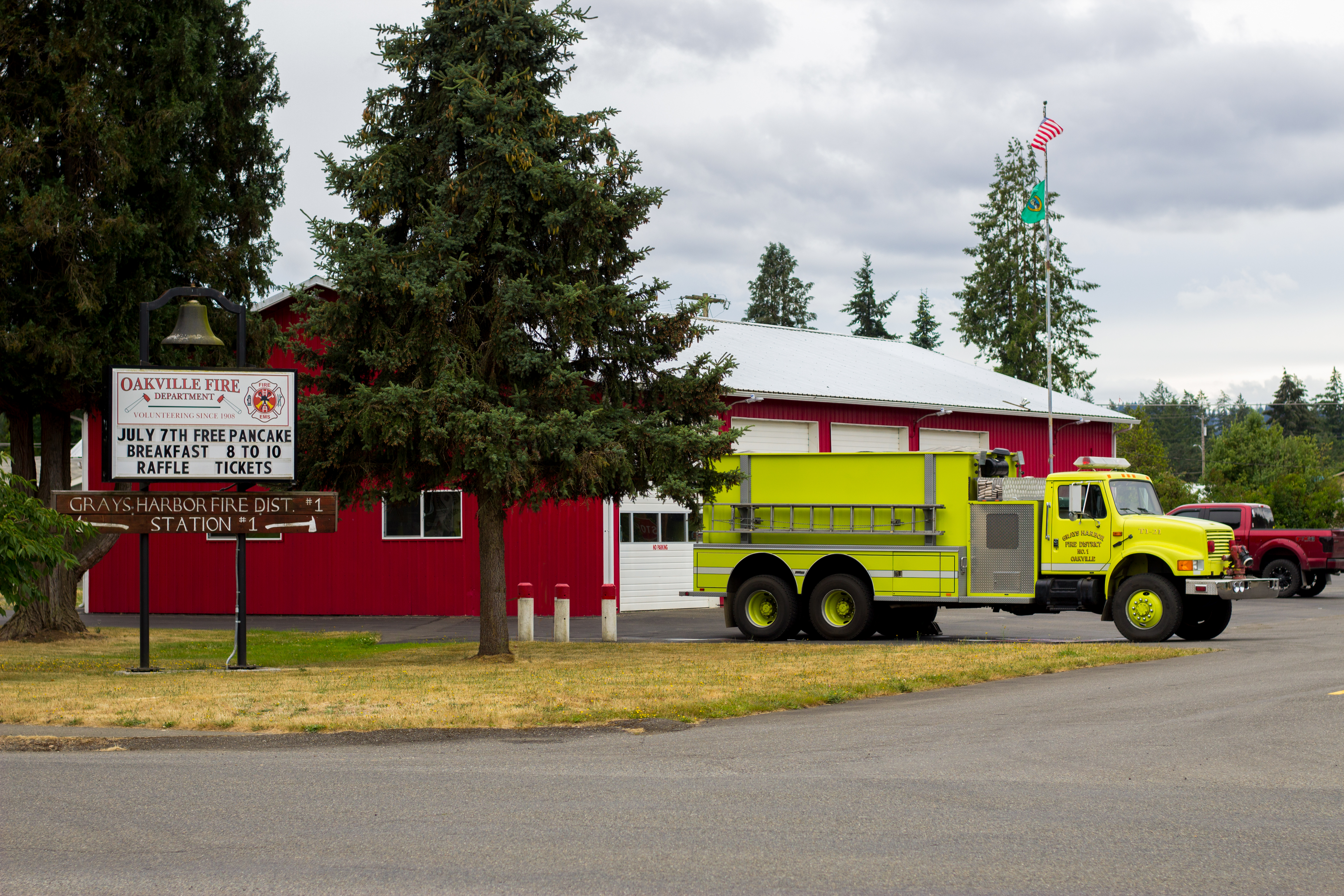
The fire station serving Oakville, Washington.

There were 260 households, of which 36.9% had children under the age of 18 living with them, 46.2% were married couples living together, 13.5% had a female householder with no husband present, 8.1% had a male householder with no wife present, and 32.3% were non-families. 22.3% of all households were made up of individuals, and 7.7% had someone living alone who was 65 years of age or older. The average household size was 2.63 and the average family size was 3.08.

The median age in the city was 37.1 years. 26% of residents were under the age of 18; 7.2% were between the ages of 18 and 24; 27% were from 25 to 44; 25.7% were from 45 to 64; and 14% were 65 years of age or older. The gender makeup of the city was 49.1% male and 50.9% female.

=== 2000 census ===
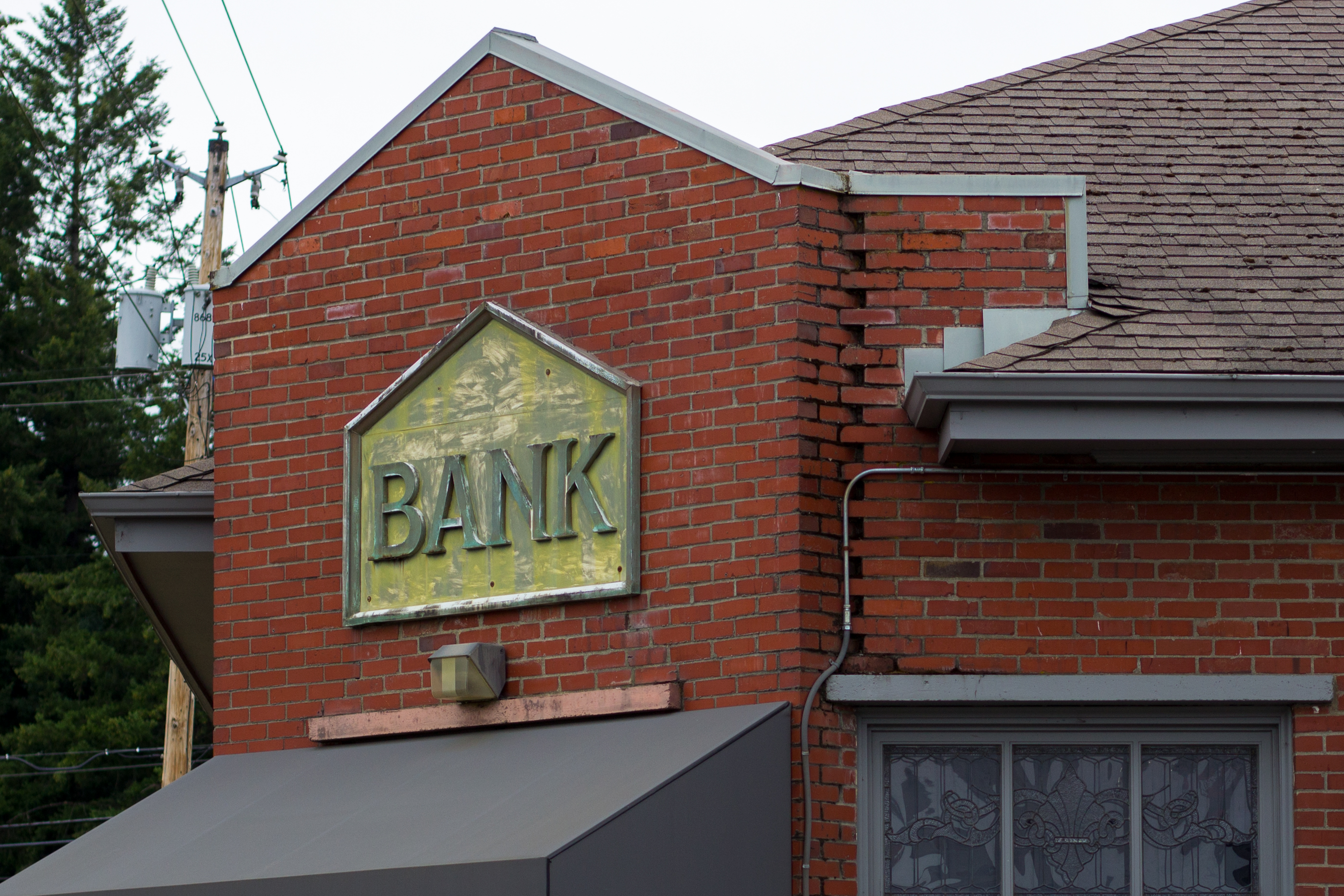
The sign for the historic bank in Oakville, Washington.

As of the 2000 census, there were 675 people, 233 households, and 170 families residing in the city. The population density was 1,407.3 people per square mile (543.0/km^{2}). There were 260 housing units at an average density of 542.1 per square mile (209.1/km^{2}). The racial makeup of the city was 81.04% White, 1.19% African American, 7.11% Native American, 0.59% Asian, 0.15% Pacific Islander, 3.41% from other races, and 6.52% from two or more races. Hispanic or Latino of any race were 7.41% of the population. 18.6% were of German, 6.8% American, 6.6% Norwegian, 5.6% Irish and 5.1% European ancestry.

There were 233 households, out of which 42.9% had children under the age of 18 living with them, 50.6% were married couples living together, 14.6% had a female householder with no husband present, and 27.0% were non-families. 21.9% of all households were made up of individuals, and 9.0% had someone living alone who was 65 years of age or older. The average household size was 2.90 and the average family size was 3.35.

In the city, the population was spread out, with 34.4% under the age of 18, 6.8% from 18 to 24, 27.4% from 25 to 44, 20.9% from 45 to 64, and 10.5% who were 65 years of age or older. The median age was 32 years. For every 100 females, there were 96.8 males. For every 100 females age 18 and over, there were 92.6 males.

The median income for a household in the city was $30,357, and the median income for a family was $32,500. Males had a median income of $32,431 versus $23,214 for females. The per capita income for the city was $13,428. About 17.5% of families and 18.6% of the population were below the poverty line, including 25.7% of those under age 18 and 23.1% of those age 65 or over.

== Economy ==
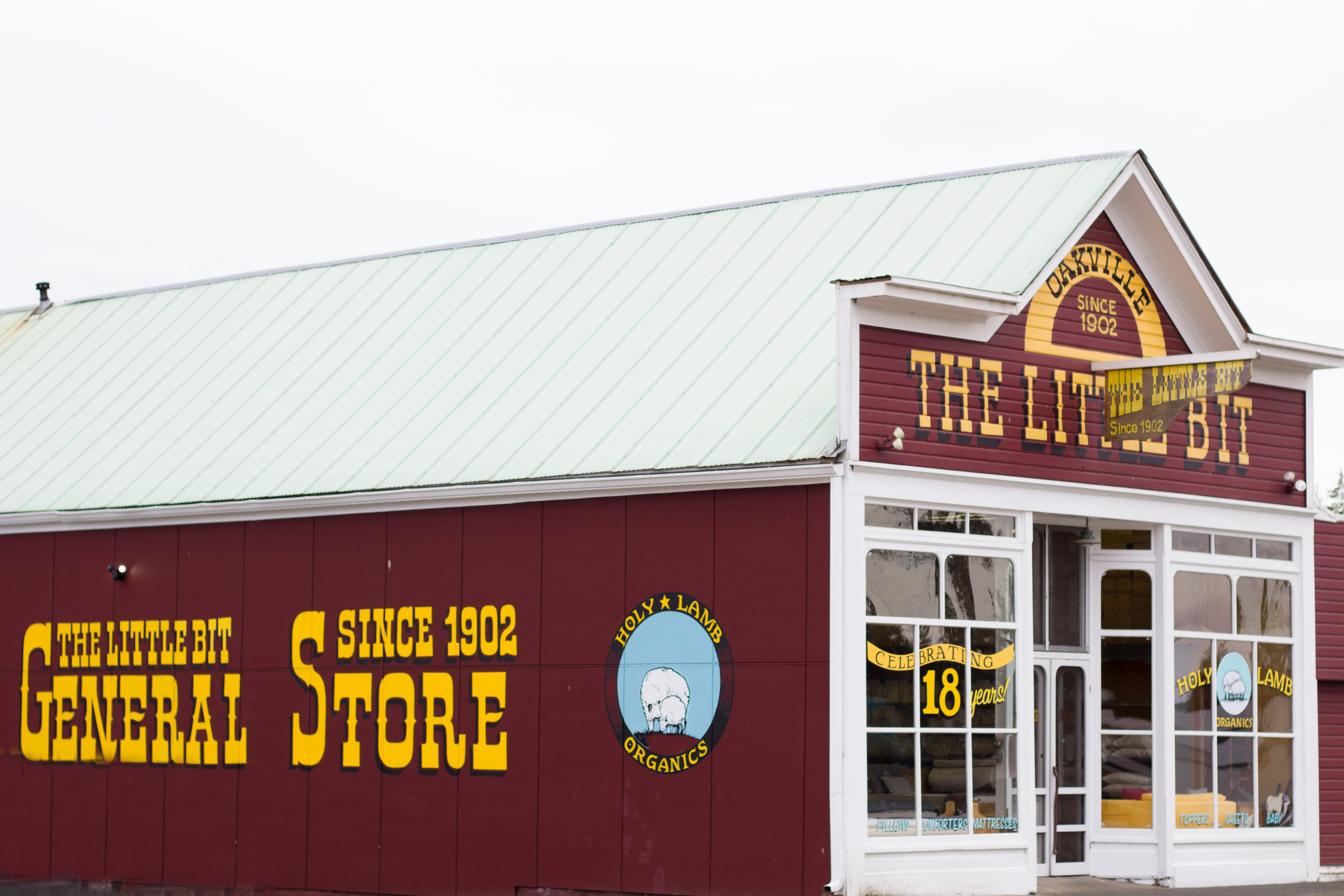
"Little Bit General Store", built in 1902

In the first few decades of Oakville, the area had a booming trade in lumber, with logging and mills providing a flourishing foundation to the economy, and with many other businesses springing up to sell to the workers these trades brought in. As the timber industry faded, many of the other businesses shut down as well.

As of 2018, Oakville's main businesses included a small grocery store, a few diners, an organic bedding manufacturer Holy Lamb Organics, an auction house, and a chip plant, as well as some farms on the outskirts of the city. Oakville also has a chamber of commerce.

== Arts and culture ==
Oakville is bordered on the east by the Confederated Tribes of the Chehalis Reservation. The tribe offers many services to its members in the community, helping to maintain the cultural heritage of the area.

Oakville is home to the Sharon Grange. Founded in August 1923 in Porter, Washington, the association moved to Oakville after taking residence in the Sharon schoolhouse. The grange is known for its annual oyster dinner.

The city is served by Timberland Regional Library. The library shares a building with city hall.

=== Festivals and events ===
The city has several annual events. In July, it hosts an Independence Day parade, temporarily closing a stretch of U.S. Highway 12. Later in the summer, it is home to the Zucchini Jubilee. Other local traditions have included a tree lighting and an egg hunt. The city also regularly hosts a Saint Patrick's Day dinner, a harvest festival, and a spaghetti dinner.

The city has commemorated the Oakville State Bank robbery throughout the years by hosting reenactments of the crime, with groups competing to give the best performance.

== Parks and recreation ==
The city has a playground, a picnic shelter, and a basketball court located at Al Brandt Municipal Park, across from city hall. The area surrounding the city is host to a variety of outdoor activities, with boating, fishing, and swimming taking place in the Chehalis and Black rivers to the south, and hiking, hunting, camping, horseback riding, and mountain biking in Capitol State Forest to the north.

The Oakville Regional Event Center hosts a variety of competitions, from rodeos to adventure races.

== Government ==
The city is governed by a mayor and a city council. The council meets twice a month. As of 2026, the mayor of Oakville is Bill Breedlove.

The city also maintains a municipal court, a cemetery, water utility, and a fire department. In the fiscal years of 2013 and 2014, the City was operating on annual budgets of approximately $800,000.

The city regularly partners with the chamber of commerce to plan community events.

== Education ==
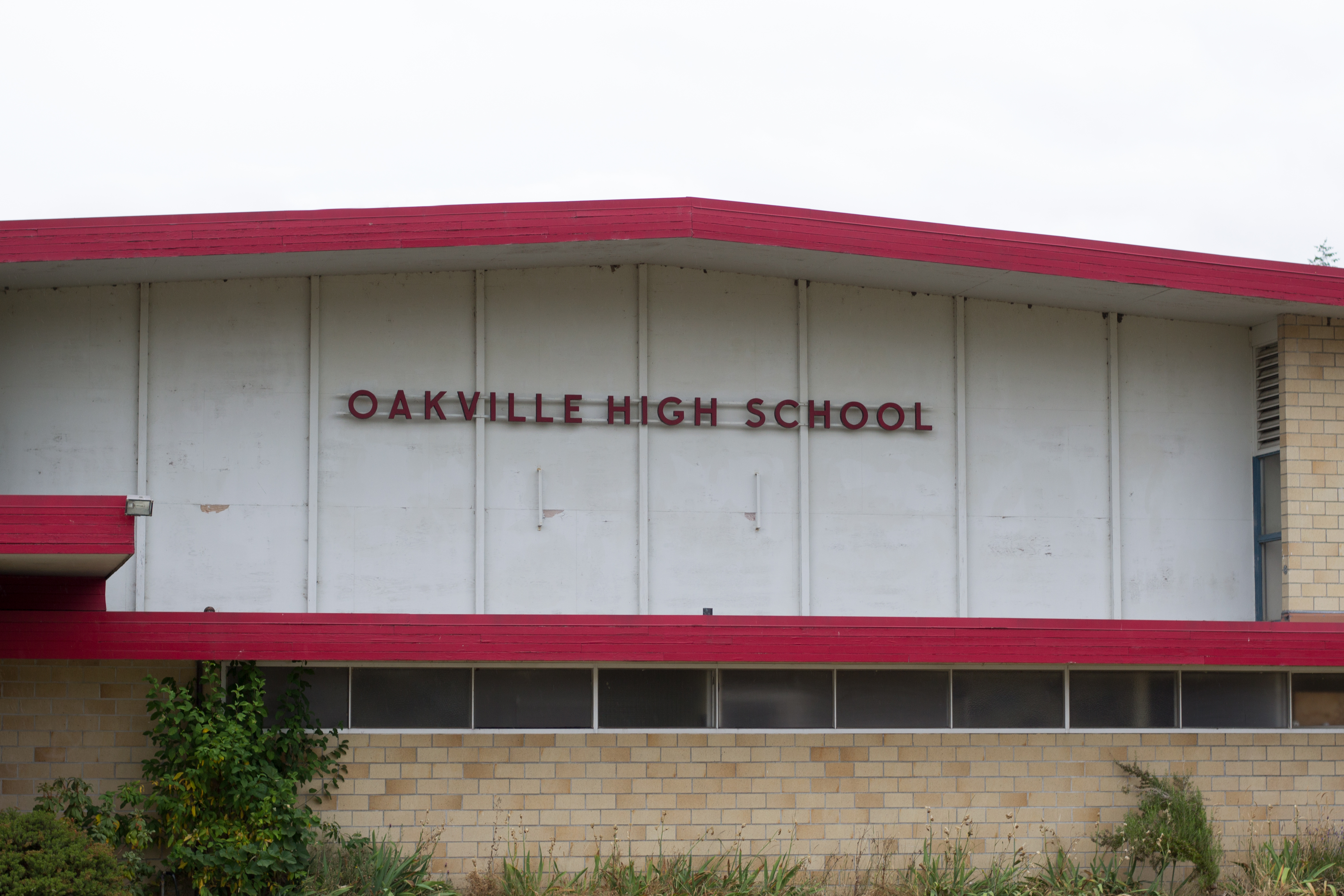
The sign on the gymnasium of the high school in Oakville, Washington.

The city is served by the Oakville School District. Oakville School District No. 400 has one elementary school, one middle school, and one high school. As of May 2018, it serves 241 students in Grays Harbor County. The Board of Directors governs the operations of the district; this board has five members, who are elected to terms lasting four years. The day-to-day operations of the district are managed under the leadership of the superintendent, who is appointed by the school board. Based on a 2016 report, the district employs approximately thirty people in the roles of teachers and support staff and the district operates on a general fund budget of approximately $3.5 million.

The original Oakville elementary school, built in 1953, began to be demolished in November 2021 after a bond program to rebuild and renovate the school system campus was passed in 2020. The $5.6 million measure covered the cost of a new elementary building and help to refurbish several areas at the high school. A separate, small schools modernization grant of $4.6 million covered additional upgrades on the campus. Additional programs, funded separately from the construction bond by business, charity, and government grants, were implemented during the time, such as the beginnings of a preschool curriculum, additional building upgrades and renovations, and the creation of a library at the elementary building. The new school was completed and opened in late 2022.

== Notable people ==
- Hazel Pete, basket weaver from the Chehalis tribe
- Katherine Van Winkle Palmer, paleontologist
- Frank Hinman Waskey, delegate from the District of Alaska
