= Grays Harbor County, Washington =

County in Washington, United States

- County
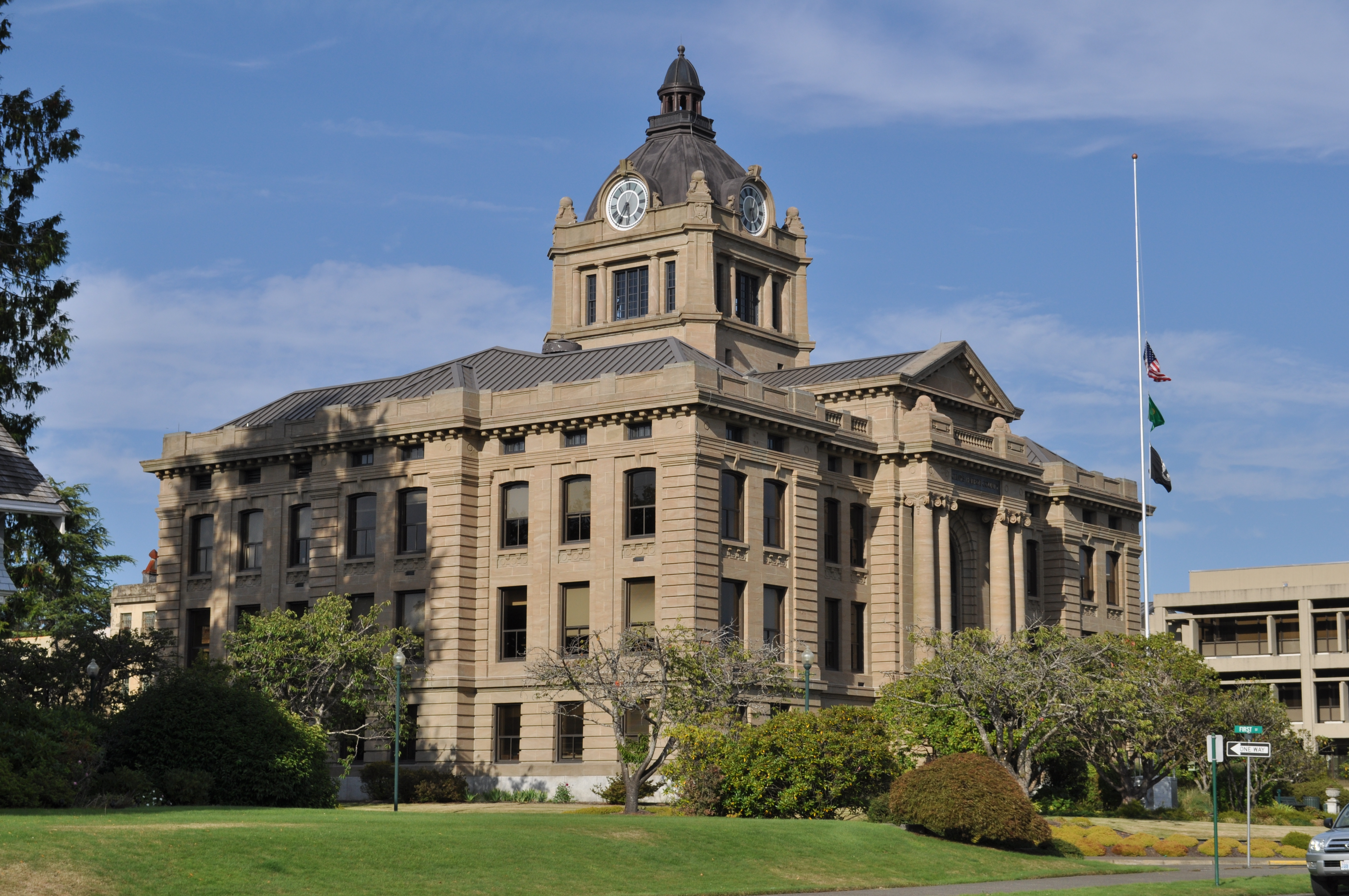
- Grays Harbor County Courthouse

- Location within the U.S. state of Washington
- Coordinates: 47°09′N 123°50′W
- Country: United States
- State: Washington
- Founded: April 14, 1854
- Named for: Grays Harbor
- Seat: Montesano
- Largest city: Aberdeen

Area
  - Total: 2,224 sq mi (5,760 km^{2})
  - Land: 1,902 sq mi (4,930 km^{2})
  - Water: 322 sq mi (830 km^{2}) 14%

Population (2020)
  - Total: 75,636
  - Estimate (2025): 78,144 ▲
  - Density: 38.3/sq mi (14.8/km^{2})
- Time zone: UTC−8 (Pacific)
  - Summer (DST): UTC−7 (PDT)
- Congressional district: 6th
- Website: www.graysharbor.us

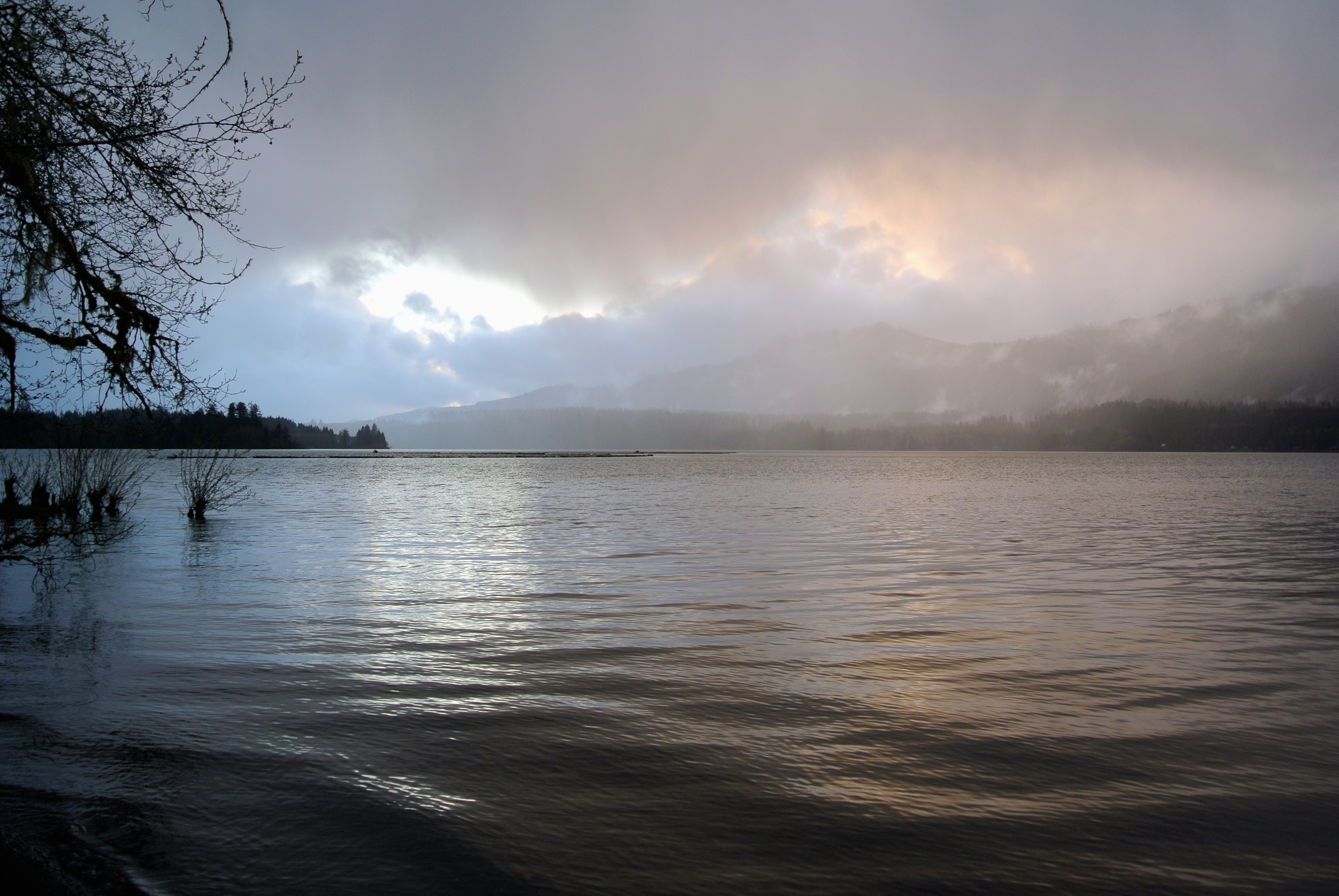
Lake Quinault

Grays Harbor County is a county in the U.S. state of Washington. As of the 2020 census, the population was 75,636. Its county seat is Montesano, and its largest city is Aberdeen. Grays Harbor County is included in the Aberdeen Micropolitan Statistical Area.

== History ==
The area that comprises modern-day Grays Harbor County is the ancestral territory of several indigenous Coast Salish peoples, including the Quinault and Lower Chehalis. They first came into contact with European explorers in the late 18th century and the tribes were later afflicted by regional epidemics. Grays Harbor was named for Boston fur trader and merchantman Robert Gray, who entered the bay on May 7, 1792. It was originally named Bullfinch Harbor and later Chehalis Bay before it was renamed for Gray. The first permanent white resident in the future county was William O'Leary, an Irish immigrant who settled on the south side of Grays Harbor in 1848.

The modern-day Washington Coast was originally part of the Oregon Country, which was administratively shared between the United States and British North America until the signing of the Oregon Treaty in 1846, which ceded it to the United States. The American Provisional Government of Oregon, which had been established prior to the treaty, created Lewis County on December 21, 1845. It encompassed most of the territory north of the Columbia River and west of the Cascade Mountains. The area around Grays Harbor remained part of Lewis County as it was transferred into the reorganized Oregon Territory in 1848 and later Washington Territory, created in 1853.

On April 14, 1854, the Washington Territorial Legislature created Chehalis County from portions of Lewis and Thurston counties that surrounded Grays Harbor. The first county seat was at Bruceport on Willapa Bay until a referendum in 1860 moved it to the homestead of the Scammon family in modern-day Montesano. The settlements of Aberdeen and Hoquiam were platted along the north side of Grays Harbor and incorporated by 1890. The cities had 80 percent of the county's population in 1900 and unsuccessfully attempted to move the county seat to one of their cities. A second plan to create a new county, named Grays Harbor, was approved by the Washington State Legislature but ruled unconstitutional by the state Supreme Court on February 27, 1907.

The state legislature passed a bill to rename Chehalis County to Grays Harbor County on March 15, 1915. The name change, which took effect on June 9, eliminated confusion with the town of Chehalis in neighboring Lewis County.

== Geography ==
According to the United States Census Bureau, the county has a total area of 2,224 square miles (5,760 km^{2}), of which 1,902 square miles (4,930 km^{2}) is land and 322 square miles (830 km^{2}) (14%) is water.

Due to the flat topography of the county and the drainage of the Chehalis River watershed into the Pacific Ocean, the region experiences repeated floods. In addition to tidal surges and coastal flooding, high waters stemming from excessive rainfall events are often difficult to shed. As of 2024, the value of various buildings and infrastructure in flood risk areas within the county is valued at over $1.0 billion.

=== Geographic features ===
- Aberdeen Lake
- Chehalis River
- Duck Lake
- Failor Lake
- Grays Harbor
- Humptulips River
- Hoquiam River
- Lake Quinault
- Olympic Mountains
- Olympic Peninsula
- Pacific Ocean
- Quinault River
- Quinault Rain Forest
- Satsop River
- Wishkah River
- Wynoochee Lake
- Wynoochee River

=== State parks ===
- Griffiths-Priday State Park
- Lake Sylvia State Park
- Ocean City State Park
- Pacific Beach State Park
- Twin Harbors State Park
- Westhaven State Park (now part of Westport Light State Park)
- Westport Light State Park

=== Major highways ===
- State Route 8
- U.S. Route 12
- U.S. Route 101
- State Route 105
- State Route 107
- State Route 109

=== Adjacent counties ===
- Jefferson County – north
- Mason County – northeast
- Thurston County – east/southeast
- Lewis County – south/southeast
- Pacific County – south

=== National protected areas ===
- Chehalis Indian Reservation
- Colonel Bob Wilderness
- Copalis National Wildlife Refuge
- Grays Harbor National Wildlife Refuge
- Olympic National Forest (part)
- Olympic National Park (part)
- Quinault Indian Reservation

== Demographics ==
Historical population
Census	Pop.	Note	%±
1860	285		—
1870	401		40.7%
1880	921		129.7%
1890	9,249		904.2%
1900	15,124		63.5%
1910	35,590		135.3%
1920	44,745		25.7%
1930	59,982		34.1%
1940	53,166		−11.4%
1950	53,644		0.9%
1960	54,465		1.5%
1970	59,553		9.3%
1980	66,314		11.4%
1990	64,175		−3.2%
2000	67,194		4.7%
2010	72,797		8.3%
2020	75,636		3.9%
2025 (est.)	78,144	▲	3.3%
U.S. Decennial Census; 1790–1960 1900–1990; 1990–2000 2010–2020

=== 2020 census ===
As of the 2020 census, the county had a population of 75,636. Of the residents, 20.0% were under the age of 18 and 22.5% were 65 years of age or older; the median age was 44.8 years. For every 100 females there were 104.9 males, and for every 100 females age 18 and over there were 104.8 males. 60.9% of residents lived in urban areas and 39.1% lived in rural areas.

Grays Harbor County, Washington – Racial and ethnic composition Note: the US Census treats Hispanic/Latino as an ethnic category. This table excludes Latinos from the racial categories and assigns them to a separate category. Hispanics/Latinos may be of any race.
Race / Ethnicity (NH = Non-Hispanic)	Pop 2000	Pop 2010	Pop 2020	% 2000	% 2010	% 2020
White alone (NH)	58,112	59,282	57,068	86.48%	81.43%	75.45%
Black or African American alone (NH)	205	762	972	0.31%	1.05%	1.29%
Native American or Alaska Native alone (NH)	2,975	3,005	3,495	4.43%	4.13%	4.62%
Asian alone (NH)	790	995	1,024	1.18%	1.37%	1.35%
Pacific Islander alone (NH)	67	177	127	0.10%	0.24%	0.17%
Other race alone (NH)	56	72	411	0.08%	0.10%	0.54%
Mixed race or Multiracial (NH)	1,731	2,232	4,705	2.58%	3.07%	6.22%
Hispanic or Latino (any race)	3,258	6,272	7,834	4.85%	8.62%	10.36%
Total	67,194	72,797	75,636	100.00%	100.00%	100.00%

The racial makeup of the county was 78.1% White, 1.4% Black or African American, 5.1% American Indian and Alaska Native, 1.4% Asian, 4.8% from some other race, and 9.0% from two or more races. Hispanic or Latino residents of any race comprised 10.4% of the population.

There were 29,869 households in the county, of which 25.8% had children under the age of 18 living with them and 26.4% had a female householder with no spouse or partner present. About 29.3% of all households were made up of individuals and 14.8% had someone living alone who was 65 years of age or older.

There were 36,058 housing units, of which 17.2% were vacant. Among occupied housing units, 69.1% were owner-occupied and 30.9% were renter-occupied. The homeowner vacancy rate was 1.9% and the rental vacancy rate was 6.9%.

=== 2010 census ===
As of the 2010 census, there were 72,797 people, 28,579 households, and 18,493 families living in the county. The population density was 38.3 inhabitants per square mile (14.8/km^{2}). There were 35,166 housing units at an average density of 18.5 units per square mile (7.1 units/km^{2}). The racial makeup of the county was 84.9% white, 4.6% American Indian, 1.4% Asian, 1.1% black or African American, 0.3% Pacific islander, 3.9% from other races, and 3.9% from two or more races. Those of Hispanic or Latino origin made up 8.6% of the population. In terms of ancestry, 21.0% were German, 13.5% were Irish, 11.7% were English, 6.8% were Norwegian, and 4.2% were American.

Of the 28,579 households, 28.8% had children under the age of 18 living with them, 46.8% were married couples living together, 11.9% had a female householder with no husband present, 35.3% were non-families, and 27.6% of all households were made up of individuals. The average household size was 2.45 and the average family size was 2.94. The median age was 41.9 years.

The median income for a household in the county was $41,899 and the median income for a family was $49,745. Males had a median income of $42,998 versus $34,183 for females. The per capita income for the county was $21,656. About 11.7% of families and 16.1% of the population were below the poverty line, including 23.1% of those under age 18 and 7.9% of those age 65 or over.

=== 2000 census ===
As of the 2000 census, there were 67,194 people, 26,808 households, and 17,907 families living in the county. The population density was 35 people per square mile (14 people/km^{2}). There were 32,489 housing units at an average density of 17 units per square mile (6.6 units/km^{2}). The racial makeup of the county was 88.30% White, 0.34% Black or African American, 4.66% Native American, 1.22% Asian, 0.11% Pacific Islander, 2.27% from other races, and 3.10% from two or more races. 4.85% of the population were Hispanic or Latino of any race. 16.3% were of German, 11.9% United States or American, 9.9% English, 9.2% Irish, and 6.1% Norwegian ancestry. 94.1% spoke English and 3.9% Spanish as their first language.

There were 26,808 households, out of which 30.50% had children under the age of 18 living with them, 50.70% were married couples living together, 11.10% had a female householder with no husband present, and 33.20% were non-families. 26.70% of all households were made up of individuals, and 11.60% had someone living alone who was 65 years of age or older. The average household size was 2.48 and the average family size was 2.98.

In the county, the population was spread out, with 25.70% under the age of 18, 7.90% from 18 to 24, 26.00% from 25 to 44, 25.00% from 45 to 64, and 15.40% who were 65 years of age or older. The median age was 39 years. For every 100 females there were 98.80 males. For every 100 females age 18 and over, there were 96.20 males.

The median income for a household in the county was $34,160, and the median income for a family was $39,709. Males had a median income of $35,947 versus $24,262 for females. The per capita income for the county was $16,799. 16.10% of the population and 11.90% of families were below the poverty line, including 21.60% of those under the age of 18 and 40% of those 65 and older.

== Politics ==
United States presidential election results for Grays Harbor County, Washington
Year	Republican		Democratic		Third party(ies)	
Year	No.	%	No.	%	No.	%
1892	990	42.02%	798	33.87%	568	24.11%
1896	1,267	47.97%	1,350	51.12%	24	0.91%
1900	1,850	58.77%	1,081	34.34%	217	6.89%
1904	2,589	68.13%	624	16.42%	587	15.45%
1908	3,128	60.35%	1,248	24.08%	807	15.57%
1912	3,055	34.66%	1,953	22.16%	3,806	43.18%
1916	5,024	44.32%	4,992	44.04%	1,320	11.64%
1920	5,920	50.94%	3,378	29.07%	2,324	20.00%
1924	8,273	60.16%	1,239	9.01%	4,239	30.83%
1928	10,798	66.30%	5,258	32.29%	230	1.41%
1932	5,141	27.89%	10,310	55.92%	2,985	16.19%
1936	5,053	23.37%	15,851	73.31%	718	3.32%
1940	8,369	35.63%	14,861	63.27%	257	1.09%
1944	7,834	35.99%	13,803	63.41%	130	0.60%
1948	8,357	36.00%	13,660	58.84%	1,198	5.16%
1952	12,168	49.30%	12,317	49.90%	198	0.80%
1956	11,599	47.32%	12,858	52.45%	57	0.23%
1960	10,067	41.94%	13,773	57.37%	166	0.69%
1964	5,744	24.94%	17,145	74.46%	138	0.60%
1968	7,720	34.03%	13,480	59.43%	1,484	6.54%
1972	10,839	45.65%	11,786	49.64%	1,120	4.72%
1976	9,464	39.61%	13,478	56.41%	951	3.98%
1980	10,226	40.19%	11,290	44.37%	3,928	15.44%
1984	11,286	43.96%	14,050	54.73%	335	1.30%
1988	8,860	37.88%	14,097	60.27%	434	1.86%
1992	6,904	25.35%	12,599	46.26%	7,735	28.40%
1996	7,635	29.09%	14,082	53.65%	4,533	17.27%
2000	11,225	43.22%	13,304	51.22%	1,443	5.56%
2004	12,871	46.05%	14,583	52.17%	499	1.79%
2008	12,104	41.47%	16,354	56.04%	726	2.49%
2012	11,914	41.54%	15,960	55.64%	810	2.82%
2016	14,067	48.01%	12,020	41.02%	3,214	10.97%
2020	19,877	51.71%	17,354	45.14%	1,210	3.15%
2024	19,432	51.42%	17,161	45.41%	1,200	3.18%

Grays Harbor County used to be one of the most consistently Democratic counties in the nation, due to its unionized logging industry. Until 2016, the last Republican presidential candidate to carry the county was Herbert Hoover in 1928; the last Republican gubernatorial candidate to win the county until 2016 was Roland H. Hartley in 1924. Donald Trump carried the county by a plurality in 2016, and went on to win a majority of its votes in both 2020 and 2024.

In the United States House of Representatives, Grays Harbor is part of Washington's 6th congressional district, which has a Cook Partisan Voting Index of D+5 and is represented by Emily Randall. In the Washington State Legislature it lies in the 19th and 24th districts. In the Washington State Senate it is represented by Mike Chapman (D) and Jeff Wilson (R). In the Washington House of Representatives it is represented by Adam Bernbaum (D), Joel McEntire (R), Steve Tharinger (D), and Jim Walsh (R).

== Economy ==
Principal economic activity in Grays Harbor County includes manufacturing, seafood, and various service industries; the largest local employers are government, healthcare, social assistance, lodging, food service, retail.

As of May 2025, Grays Harbor County had 23,840 non-farm jobs and an unemployment rate of 5.5% without adjustments for seasonal labor; there was a total of 1,607 unemployed individuals.

== Infrastructure ==
To combat flooding concerns, the county has received several upgrades or new builds of flood protection systems under the combined efforts of the Chehalis River Basin Flood Authority and county, federal, and local governments, beginning in 2012. Mostly consisting of pumping stations in flood-prone communities, the efforts also include the construction of floodwalls and levees. The ongoing project is estimated to cost over $50 million as of 2024, providing protection to over 5,100 residences and 1,300 businesses.

== Communities ==
=== Cities ===
- Aberdeen
- Cosmopolis
- Elma
- Hoquiam
- McCleary
- Montesano (county seat)
- Oakville
- Ocean Shores
- Westport

=== Census-designated places ===
- Aberdeen Gardens
- Amanda Park
- Brady
- Central Park
- Chehalis Village (former)
- Cohassett Beach
- Copalis Beach
- Grayland
- Hogans Corner
- Humptulips
- Junction City (former)
- Malone
- Markham
- Moclips
- Neilton
- Ocosta
- Ocean City
- Oyehut
- Pacific Beach
- Porter
- Queets (part)
- Qui-nai-elt Village
- Santiago
- Satsop
- Taholah

=== Other unincorporated communities ===
- Aloha
- Artic
- Alder Grove
- Axford
- Bay City
- Carlisle
- Copalis Crossing
- Deckerville
- Garden City
- Gray Gables
- Grays Harbor City
- Heather
- Melbourne
- New London
- Newton
- Nisson
- Quinault
- Saginaw
- Seabrook
- Sine
- South Elma
- South Montesano
- Vesta
- Whites
- Wishkah

== Education ==
School districts include:

- Aberdeen School District
- Cosmopolis School District
- Elma School District
- Hoquiam School District
- Mary M. Knight School District
- Lake Quinault School District
- McCleary School District
- Montesano School District
- North Beach School District
- North River School District
- Oakville School District
- Ocosta School District
- Rochester School District
- Satsop School District
- Taholah School District
- Wishkah Valley School District

== Notable people ==
- Robert Arthur, actor
- Elton Bennett, artist
- Adam Bighill, CFL player
- Gail Brown, actress
- Trisha Brown, choreographer
- Mark Bruener, NFL player
- Jeff Burlingame, author
- Daniel Bryan, professional wrestler
- Robert Eugene Bush, Medal of Honor recipient
- Kurt Cobain, musician
- Colin Cowherd, ESPN Radio host (The Herd with Colin Cowherd)
- Dale Crover, musician
- Reuben H. Fleet, aviation pioneer
- Clarence Chesterfield Howerton, circus performer
- Jerry Lambert, actor
- Robert Motherwell, artist
- Peter Norton, software developer (Norton Utilities)
- Krist Novoselic, musician
- Buzz Osborne, musician
- Douglas Osheroff, Nobel-winning physicist
- Blanche Pennick, Washington State legislator
- Patrick Simmons, musician
- Kurdt Vanderhoof, musician

== See also ==
- Port of Grays Harbor
- National Register of Historic Places listings in Grays Harbor County, Washington
