= List of Washington Natural Area Preserves =

This is a list of Natural Area Preserves (NAPs), part of the Washington Natural Areas Program managed by Washington Department of Natural Resources.

Name	County	Location/GPS Coordinates	Notes
Marcellus Shrub Steppe	Adams	47.231°N 118.412°W	
Camas Meadows	Chelan	47.489°N 120.595°W	
Entiat Slopes	Chelan	47.649°N 120.251°W	
Upper Dry Gulch	Chelan	47.331°N 120.149°W	
Washougal Oaks	Clark	45.565°N 122.270°W	Largest remaining Garry oak forest in Western Washington
The Two-Steppe	Douglas	47.599°N 119.633°W	
Kahlotus Ridgetop	Franklin	46.695°N 118.555°W	
Castle Rock	Grant	47.890°N 119.065°W	
Carlisle Bog	Grays Harbor	47.143°N 124.084°W	Sphagnum bog
Chehalis River Surge Plain	Grays Harbor	46.941°N 123.705°W	
Goose Island	Grays Harbor	46.979°N 124.070°W	Island in Grays Harbor, sometimes submerged
North Bay	Grays Harbor	47.049°N 124.103°W	Sphagnum bog
Sand Island	Grays Harbor	46.962°N 124.062°W	Island in Grays Harbor, sometimes submerged
Whitcomb Flats	Grays Harbor	46.909°N 124.074°W	Island in Grays Harbor, sometimes submerged
Admiralty Inlet	Island	48.176°N 122.686°W	Located inside Ebey's Landing National Historical Reserve; population of threatened golden paintbrush
Clearwater Bogs	Jefferson	47.583°N 124.165°W	Sphagnum bog
Dabob Bay	Jefferson	47.834°N 122.827°W	
Charley Creek	King	47.242°N 121.793°W	
Kings Lake Bog	King	47.596°N 121.779°W	Sphagnum bog
Snoqualmie Bog	King	47.662°N 121.622°W	Sphagnum bog
Kitsap Forest	Kitsap	47.612°N 122.867°W	One of the last old-growth forests in Puget Sound region
Badger Gulch	Klickitat	45.842°N 120.537°W	Oak savanna
Cleveland Shrub Steppe	Klickitat	45.961°N 120.376°W	
Columbia Hills	Klickitat	45.704°N 121.075°W	
Monte Cristo	Klickitat	45.906°N 121.557°W	
Trout Lake	Klickitat	46.018°N 121.563°W	
Spring Creek Canyon	Lincoln	47.750°N 117.889°W	
Hamma Hamma Balds	Mason	47.585°N 123.075°W	Rocky balds
Ink Blot	Mason	47.293°N 123.242°W	Sphagnum bog
Oak Patch	Mason	47.477°N 122.920°W	
Schumacher Creek	Mason	47.311°N 123.080°W	Also spelled Schumocher Creek; Critically imperiled Sitka alder/skunk cabbage/water parsley community
Skookum Inlet	Mason	47.139°N 123.081°W	
Kennedy Creek	Mason and Thurston	47.095°N 123.080°W	One of the largest Chum salmon spawning areas in the lower Puget Sound
Barker Mountain	Okanogan	48.680°N 119.300°W	
Chopaka Mountain	Okanogan	48.975°N 119.780°W	2,764 acres (1,119 ha) surrounding summit of Chopaka Mountain
Davis Canyon	Okanogan	48.240°N 119.766°W	
Methow Rapids	Okanogan	48.032°N 119.892°W	
Riverside Breaks	Okanogan	48.484°N 119.496°W	
Bone River	Pacific	46.659°N 123.870°W	
Gunpowder Island	Pacific	46.658°N 124.036°W	
Niawiakum River	Pacific	46.632°N 123.914°W	
Willapa Divide	Pacific	46.448°N 123.581°W	Old-growth forest
Point Doughty	San Juan	48.708°N 122.941°W	Adjacent to Point Doughty Recreation Site
Cypress Highlands	Skagit	48.579°N 122.725°W	Wetlands and rocky balds
Olivine Bridge	Skagit	48.615°N 121.905°W	Dwarf forest on serpentine soil
Skagit Bald Eagle	Skagit	48.469°N 121.453°W	1,546 acres (626 ha), part of 8,000-acre (3,200 ha) Skagit River Bald Eagle Natural Area
Columbia Falls	Skamania	45.615°N 122.134°W	Threatened Larch Mountain salamander, threatened and sensitive plant species
Pinecroft	Spokane	47.682°N 117.232°W	
Little Pend Oreille River	Stevens	48.589°N 117.555°W	
Bald Hill	Thurston	46.821°N 122.433°W	Cliffs and rocky balds; over 1,000 plant species
Mima Mounds	Thurston	46.89°N 123.05°W	
Rocky Prairie	Thurston	46.918°N 122.859°W	
Dailey Prairie	Whatcom	48.723°N 122.037°W	
Selah Cliffs	Yakima	46.705°N 120.455°W	Near Selah Creek Bridge; largest known population of threatened basalt daisy

== Sources ==
- Natural Area Preserves, Washington Department of Natural Resources, archived from the original on January 14, 2010
- Natural Area List by Agency: Washington DNR, Pacific Northwest Interagency Natural Areas Network
