= KXRO =

Radio station in Aberdeen, Washington

- Aberdeen, Washington; United States
- Broadcast area: Grays Harbor
- Frequency: 1320 kHz
- Branding: KXRO News Radio

Programming
- Format: News/talk
- Network: CBS News Radio
- Affiliations: NBC News Radio; Premiere Networks; Radio America; Westwood One

Ownership
- Owner: Connoisseur Media; (Alpha Media Licensee LLC)
- Sister stations: KDUX-FM, KWOK, KXXK

History
- First air date: May 28, 1928; 97 years ago
- Former frequencies: 1320 kHz (1927–1928); 1340 kHz (1928); 1420 kHz (1928–1929); 1310 kHz (1929–1941); 1340 kHz (1941–1950)

Technical information
- Licensing authority: FCC
- Facility ID: 52674
- Class: B
- Power: 5,000 watts day 1,000 watts night
- Transmitter coordinates: 46°57′26.3″N 123°48′38.6″W
- Translator: 101.7 K269FT (Hoquiam)

Links
- Public license information: Public file; LMS
- Webcast: Listen Live
- Website: kxro.com

KXRO (1320 AM) is a commercial radio station broadcasting a news/talk radio format. Licensed to Aberdeen, Washington, the station serves the Grays Harbor section of Washington. It is currently owned by Connoisseur Media.

KXRO is also heard on a 250 watt FM translator, 101.7 MHz K269FT in Hoquiam.

== Programming ==
Weekday mornings begin with a news and information program, "The KXRO Morning News." That's followed with a call-in show, "Live @ Nine." The rest of the schedule is made up of nationally syndicated shows including The Ramsey Show with Dave Ramsey, The Dana Show with Dana Loesch, The Thom Hartmann Program, Our American Stories with Lee Habeeb, Ground Zero with Clyde Lewis, Coast to Coast AM with George Noory and America in the Morning.

Weekends feature shows on religion, movies, technology and the outdoors. Weekend syndicated shows include Rich DeMuro on Tech, Meet The Press and Somewhere in Time with Art Bell as well as repeats of weekday shows. Most hours begin with world and national news from CBS Radio News.

== History ==
KXRO signed on the air on May 28, 1928. Its studios and offices were originally located in Hotel Morck, a noted resort hotel in Aberdeen. Its power was only 100 watts at first, and it was owned by KXRO, Inc. It spent time on several different radio frequencies.

With the enactment of the North American Regional Broadcasting Agreement (NARBA) in 1941, KXRO moved to 1340 kHz, powered at 250 watts. It was a network affiliate of the Mutual Broadcasting System and the Don Lee Network during the "Golden Age of Radio."

In 1950, KXRO moved to 1320 kHz, its current dial position. That was coupled with an increase in power to 1,000 watts. In the 1960s, it got another boost in daytime power, to 5,000 watts. As the era of network programming ended for radio and moved to television, KXRO adopted a full service middle of the road music format.

Previous logo

By the 1990s, KXRO had moved from a mix of music and talk to all talk.
