= Grays Harbor National Wildlife Refuge =

Protected area in Washington state, US

- IUCN category IV (habitat/species management area)
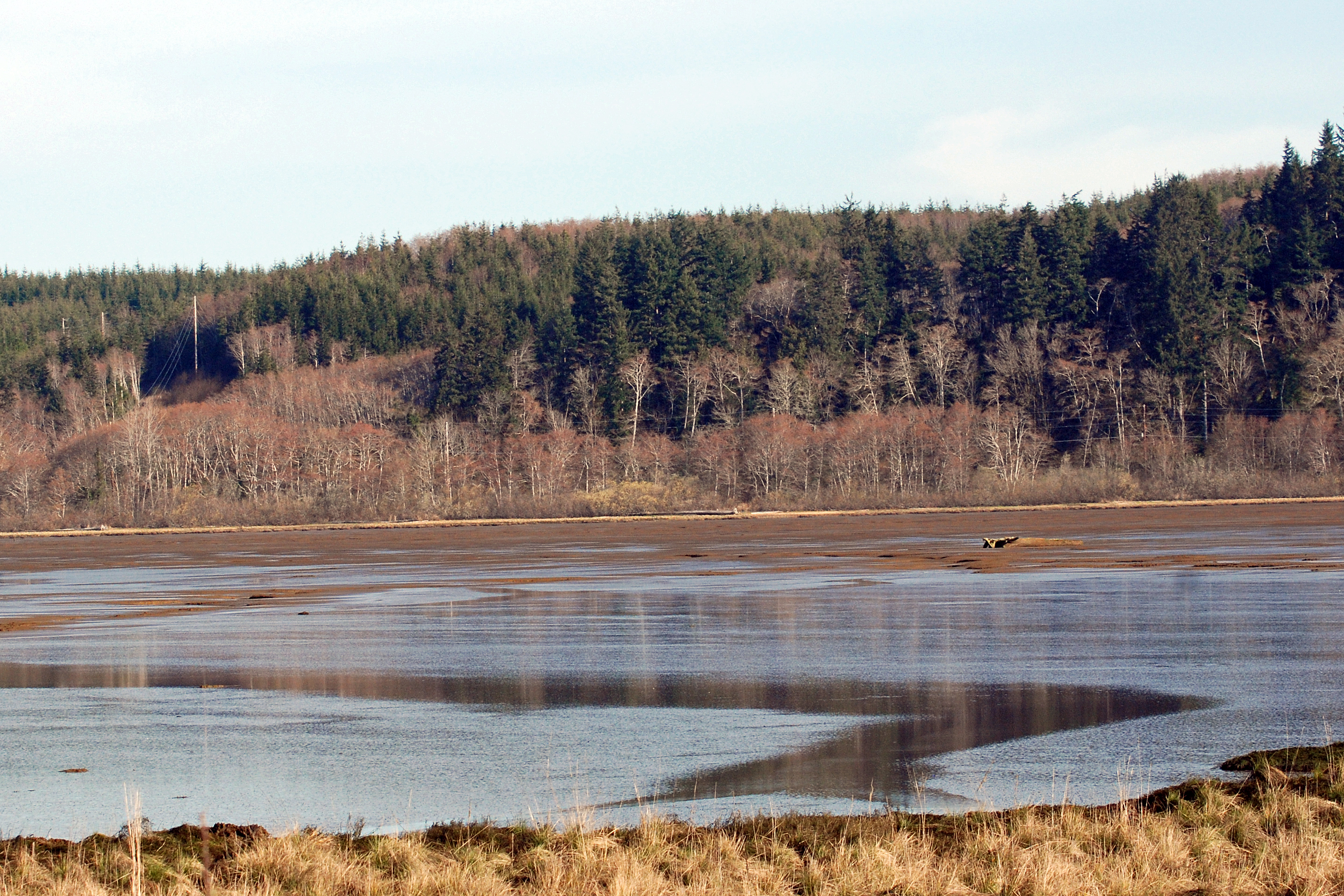
- Salt marsh

- Location within Washington (state)
- Location: Grays Harbor County, Washington, United States
- Nearest city: Hoquiam, Washington
- Coordinates: 46°58′26″N 123°55′50″W
- Area: 1,471.38 acres (595.45 ha)
- Established: 1990
- Governing body: U.S. Fish and Wildlife Service
- Website: Grays Harbor National Wildlife Refuge

Grays Harbor National Wildlife Refuge is located within Grays Harbor, at the mouth of the Chehalis River, which makes up the second largest watershed in Washington. It is one of four major staging areas for migrating shorebirds in the Pacific Flyway. Up to one million shorebirds gather here in spring and fall to feed and rest.

Grays Harbor is designated as a Western Hemisphere Shorebird Reserve Network Site, recognizing this internationally significant shorebird habitat. Although the refuge occupies only two percent of the intertidal habitat of Grays Harbor, it hosts up to 50 percent of the shorebirds that stage in the estuary. As many as 24 species of shorebirds use Grays Harbor National Wildlife Refuge, with the most abundant species being western sandpiper and dunlin. Semipalmated plover, least sandpiper, red knot, and black-bellied plover are also common during migration. The refuge is also used by peregrine falcon, bald eagle, northern harrier, Caspian tern, great blue heron, songbirds, and a variety of waterfowl.

The accessible boardwalk offers a means to develop and implement interpretation and education programs for the more than half a million shorebirds who pass by each year on their way through the gateway to the Olympic Peninsula.
