= KXXK =

Radio station in Hoquiam, Washington

- Hoquiam, Washington; United States
- Broadcast area: Aberdeen, Washington
- Frequency: 95.3 MHz
- Branding: KIX 95.3

Programming
- Format: Country
- Affiliations: Premiere Networks; Westwood One

Ownership
- Owner: Connoisseur Media; (Alpha Media Licensee LLC)
- Sister stations: KDUX-FM; KWOK; KXRO

History
- First air date: 1965 (as KHOK-FM)
- Former call signs: KHOK-FM (1965); KGHO-FM (1965–1995); KJET-FM (1995); KGHO (1995–1996); KGHO-FM (1996–2000)

Technical information
- Licensing authority: FCC
- Facility ID: 67897
- Class: A
- ERP: 3,500 watts
- HAAT: 129 meters (423 ft)
- Transmitter coordinates: 46°55′54.3″N 123°44′8.5″W

Links
- Public license information: Public file; LMS
- Webcast: Listen Live
- Website: kix953.com

KXXK (95.3 FM, "KIX 95.3") is a radio station broadcasting a country music format. Licensed to Hoquiam, Washington, United States, the station is owned by Connoisseur Media.
