= Kennedy Creek Natural Area Preserve =

Protected area in Washington state, US

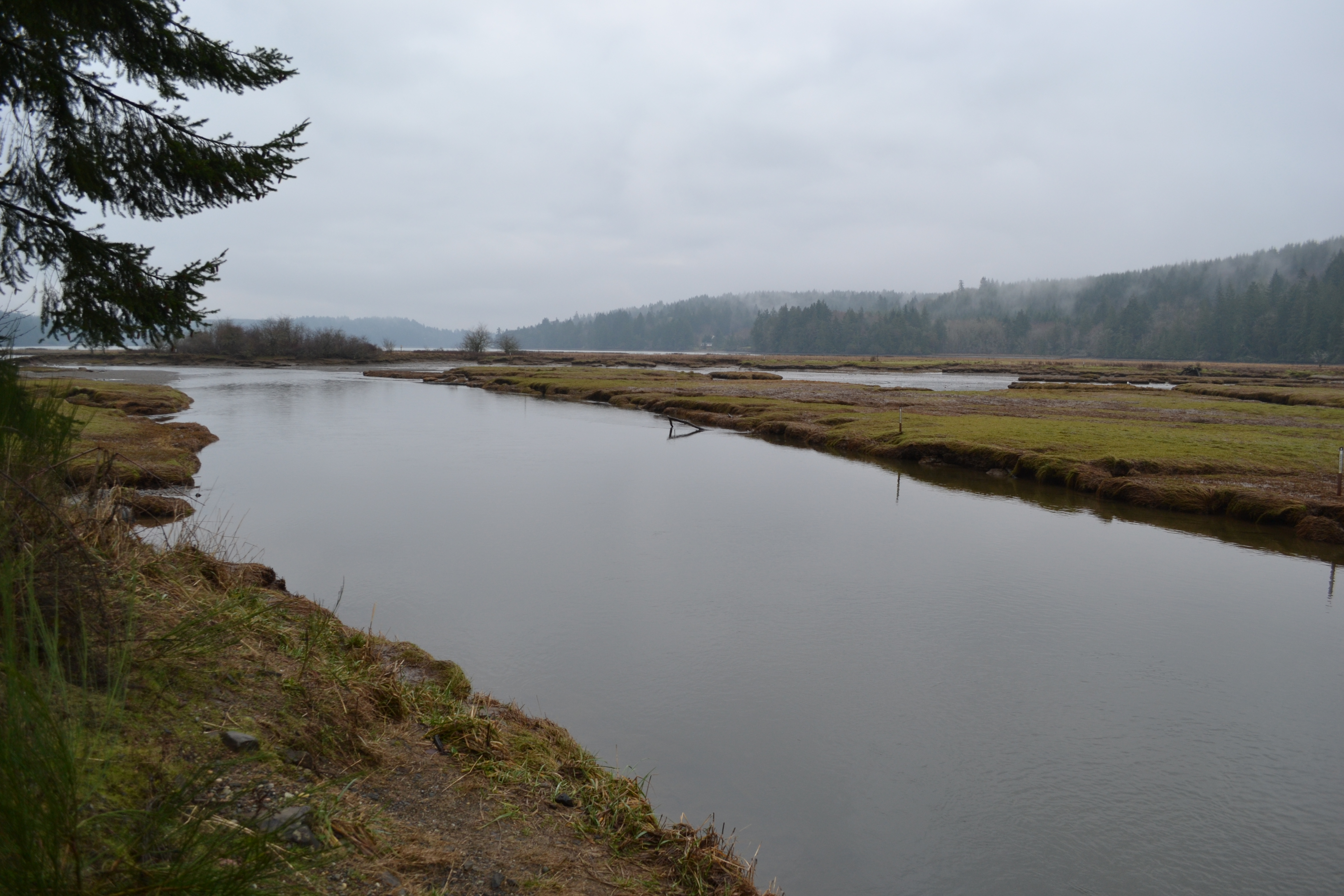

- Location within Washington (state) Location within the United States
- Location: Southwest Washington, Washington, United States
- Coordinates: 47.095°N 123.080°W
- Area: 203 acres (82 ha)
- Established: 1999
- Governing body: Washington Department of Natural Resources
- Website: DNR - Kennedy Creek Natural Area Preserve

Kennedy Creek Natural Area Preserve is a state-protected natural area near US Highway 101 on Oyster Bay, Puget Sound, in southwest Washington state, United States. The preserve is on the border of Thurston County and Mason County and contains 203 acres (82 ha) of intertidal salt marsh and upland forest.

The area is located approximately 100 yards from the junction of U.S. Highway 101 and Old Olympic Highway, about a 15-minute drive from Washington's capital city of Olympia. Parking areas are located on the side of Old Olympic Highway, and a short all-weather pedestrian trail leads to an improved wildlife viewing and interpretive area. The preserve is visited by large numbers of migratory waterfowl, especially in winter months. Birding is best on a falling tide.

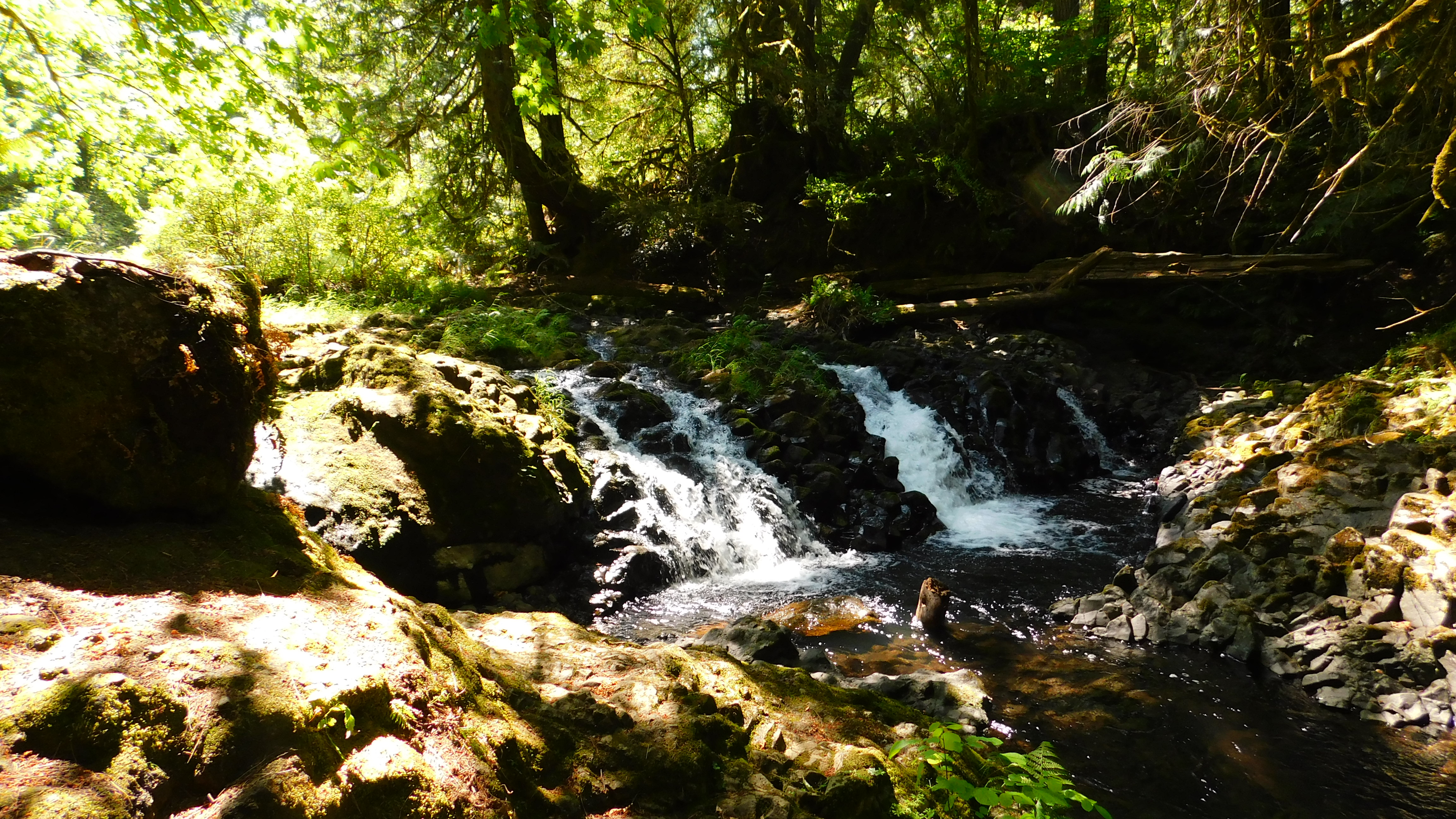
Kennedy Creek Falls, 2024

Kennedy Creek, whose headwaters are 500-foot (150 m) Summit Lake in the Black Hills, is one of the largest Chum salmon spawning areas in the lower Puget Sound, and has a genetically distinct run of Chum salmon. A forest trail about 1 mile (1.6 km) up from Oyster Bay along Kennedy Creek was opened in 2000 for salmon viewing during spawning season.

A $1 million expansion of the area has been proposed and is pending legislative action.

== See also ==
- List of geographic features in Thurston County, Washington
- List of parks and recreation in Thurston County, Washington
- List of Washington Natural Area Preserves
- Schneider Creek
