= SS Great Republic (1866) =

Coordinates: 46.278°N 124.024°W

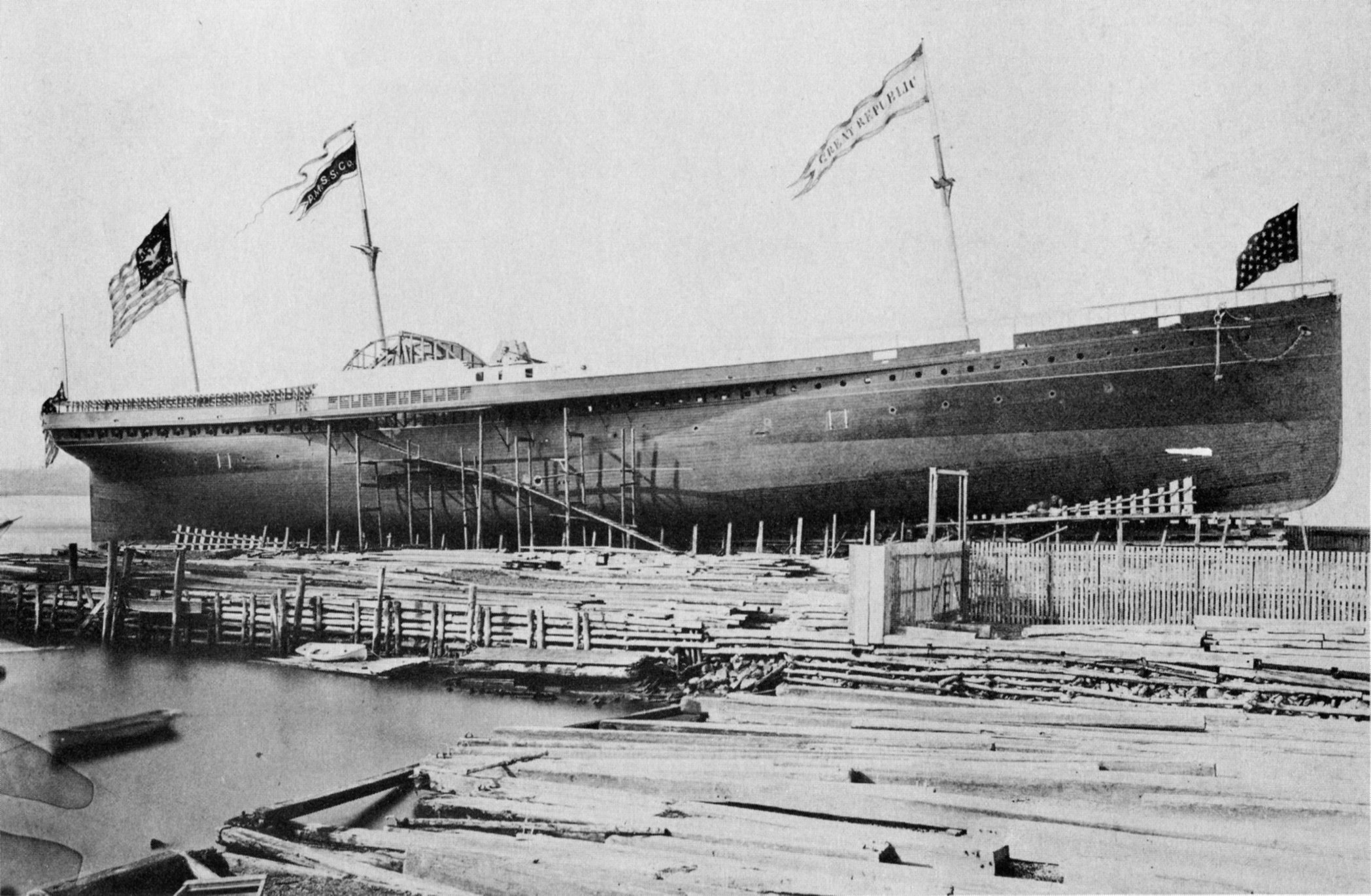
- Great Republic under construction at the yard of Henry Steers, New York, 1866

History

United States
- Name: Great Republic
- Owner: Pacific Mail Steamship Company
- Route: San Francisco–China
- Builder: Henry Steers
- Launched: 8 November 1866
- Fate: Wrecked on Sand Island, 19 April 1879

General characteristics
- Type: Passenger-cargo sidewheel steamship
- Tonnage: 4,100 GRT
- Length: 380 ft (120 m)
- Beam: 50 ft (15 m)
- Depth of hold: 31 ft 6 in (9.60 m)
- Propulsion: 105 in (2,700 mm) bore by 12 ft (3.7 m) stroke vertical beam steam engine
- Speed: 15 to 20 knots (28 to 37 km/h; 17 to 23 mph)
- Capacity: 1,450 passengers

SS Great Republic was a sidewheel steamship and the largest passenger liner on the US west coast when it ran aground near the mouth of the Columbia River, on Sand Island, south of Ilwaco, Washington, in 1879, in a region of frequent wrecks known as the Graveyard of the Pacific.

== Design ==
Great Republic was launched from Henry Steers's shipyard (see George Steers and Co), at Greenpoint, Long Island, New York on November 8, 1866, and was the largest ship of any kind that at that date had ever been built in the United States for commercial purposes. She was the first of the ships built by Pacific Mail Steamship Company for the new line between San Francisco, California and China, China Line, and was 380 feet (120 m) long, 50 feet (15 m) wide and 31 feet 6 inches (9.60 m) deep in hold.

== Construction details ==
Her frame timbers were of white and live oak, fastened with copper and iron, and braced with straps of iron five inches (130 mm) wide and seven-eighths-inch (22 mm) thick, crossing each other diagonally every four feet (1.2 m). The inner planking was also double-strapped, and outside the iron strapping was a double planking of Georgia yellow pine. The whole was thoroughly braced, and bolted together with three-nails of locust, iron, and composition spikes, and copper bolts.

Great Republic had three masts, and was full ship-rigged, her foremast, however being the highest of the three, and her mizzenmast the shortest. She had three full decks, with an orlop deck fore and aft, extending to the engine bulkhead. She had four stout, watertight bulkheads, dividing the hold into five separate compartments.

Immediately after the launch the steamer was taken to the wharf of the Novelty Iron Works (New York), at the foot of Twelfth Street, where she received her machinery, after being copper-bottomed at the Erie Basin Dock. It took 21 months to build her engines and put them in place. Steam was supplied to the cylinder by four horizontal tubular boilers, each heated by four furnaces, their grates having a surface of 560 square feet (52 m^{2}). The heating surface presented to the action of the furnaces was 15,100 square feet (1,400 m^{2}). The paddle-wheels were 40 feet (12 m) in diameter, having a face of 12 feet (3.7 m), each wheel being provided with 34 oak buckets.

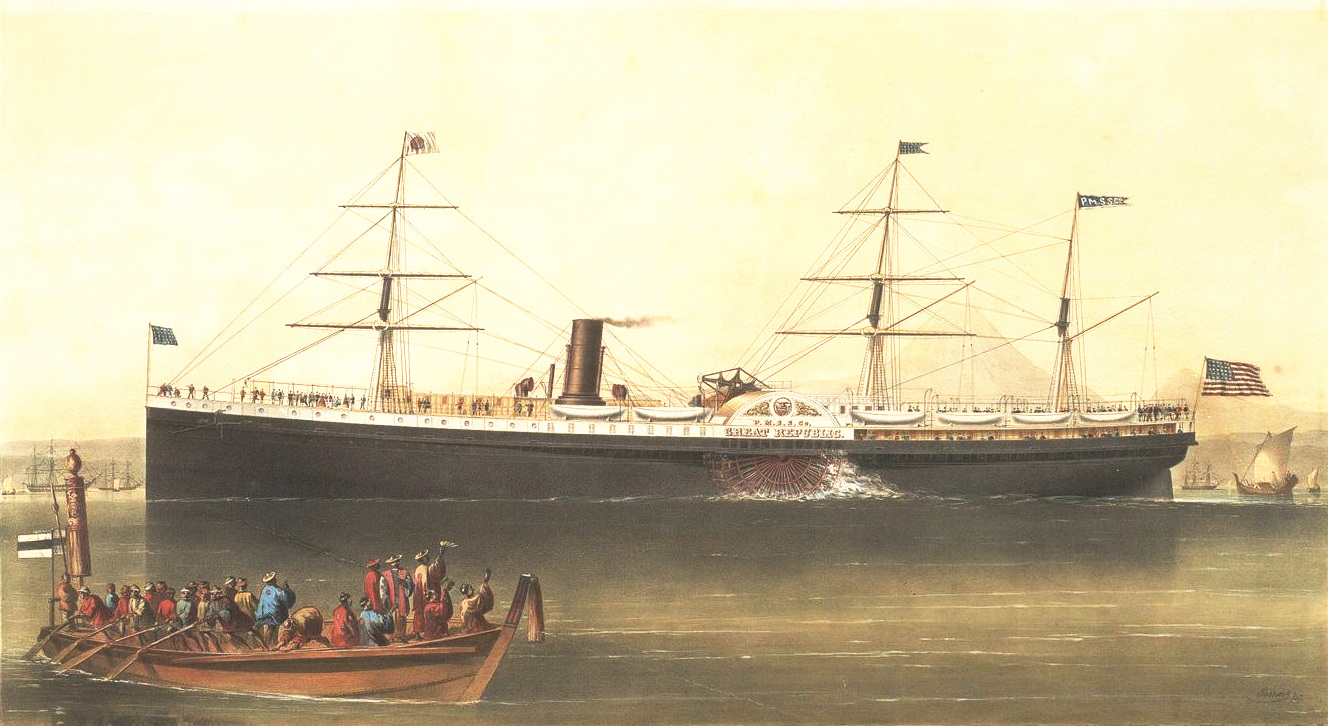
Great Republic (1866 steamship)

The only accident at her launch was the loss of two anchors, the cables breaking the ship was hove to in the river. She was arranged for 20 per cent more power than the other large vessels then in the company's fleet, and was built to make from 15 to 20 knots (28 to 37 km/h; 17 to 23 mph). Her gross register tonnage was 3,881 tons, the same as SS America and SS Japan.

== Loss ==
Great Republic eventually proved unprofitable in the China trade and was sold in 1878 to P. B. Cornwall for service along the U.S. Pacific coast.

On April 19, 1879, on a clear and calm night, the vessel traveled with over 1,000 passengers and crew, or with 94 crew and 579 passengers. After crossing the Columbia Bar at the beginning of an ebb tide, the pilot failed to heed the captain's warnings and ran aground on Sand Island.

Stranded on sand in a falling tide with a storm approaching the next morning, the captain evacuated the 896 passengers to Astoria, Oregon, on local boats. The crew remained aboard to re-float the vessel, but storm-driven waves began breaking up the hull, and they abandoned ship. The last boat to leave (except for that of the captain and pilot) overturned after a steering oar broke, casting 14 men into the water, resulting in the death of eleven, or all 14. Waves shortly rendered the vessel a total loss, though parts of the wreckage remained visible at low tide for many years.

The book Pacific Graveyard by James Gibbs Jr. states that Great Republic left San Francisco in the spring of 1879 and arrived off the mouth of the Columbia River at midnight on April 18, and was on the way to Portland, Oregon, heading upriver, when it ran aground on Sand Island and was lost. This contradicts some accounts that claim the ship was traveling in the opposite direction, heading out to sea. Primary sources quoted in Gibbs' book support his version of the story, as follows:

"The most authoritative account of the wreck was given by Capt. James Carroll, the ship's master, who testified at a special hearing following the loss of the ship ... 'There was not a ripple on the water, and we came over the bar under a slow bell all the way, crossing safely and reaching the inside buoy. The first and the third officers were on the lookout with me. I had a pair of glasses and was the first to discover Sand Island, and found the bearings all right. I reported it to the pilot, who had not yet seen it. We ran along probably two minutes, and then I told the pilot that I thought we were getting too close to the island and that he had better haul her up. He replied, I do not think we are in far enough. A minute later I said, Port your helm and put it hard over, as I think you are getting too near the island. He made no reply, but ran along for about five minutes and then put the helm hard aport, and the vessel swung up, heading toward Astoria, but the ebb tide caught her on the starboard bow and, being so near the island, sent her on the spit."

== Discovery of the wreck ==
Discovery of the wreck occurred in 1986, by a diver working to free a snagged fishing net. Following discovery, the vessel was believed to be Isabella, lost in 1830, carrying cargo to the Hudson's Bay Company outpost at Fort Vancouver. However, later analysis of the wreck's planking, proven to be American yellow pine, as well as the size of the wreck, suggests the wreck is instead Great Republic.
