= KDUX-FM =

Radio station in Hoquiam, Washington

- Hoquiam, Washington; United States
- Frequency: 104.7 MHz
- Branding: 104.7 KDUX

Programming
- Format: Classic rock

Ownership
- Owner: Connoisseur Media; (Alpha Media Licensee LLC)
- Sister stations: KWOK; KXRO; KXXK

History
- First air date: October 4, 1964

Technical information
- Licensing authority: FCC
- Facility ID: 52676
- Class: C2
- ERP: 31,000 watts
- HAAT: 110 meters (360 ft)
- Transmitter coordinates: 46°56′0.3″N 123°43′53.5″W

Links
- Public license information: Public file; LMS
- Webcast: Listen live
- Website: www.kdux.com

KDUX-FM (104.7 FM) is a radio station broadcasting a classic rock music format. Licensed to Hoquiam, Washington, United States, the station is owned by Connoisseur Media, through Alpha Media Licensee LLC.
