= KWOK =

Radio station in Aberdeen, Washington

- Aberdeen, Washington; United States
- Broadcast area: Grays Harbor County
- Frequency: 1490 kHz
- Branding: ESPN Radio 1490

Programming
- Format: Sports
- Affiliations: ESPN Radio; Westwood One

Ownership
- Owner: Connoisseur Media; (Alpha Media Licensee LLC)
- Sister stations: KDUX-FM; KXRO; KXXK

History
- First air date: November 16, 1961; 64 years ago
- Former call signs: KHOK (1961–1965); KGHO (1965–1995); KJET (1995–1999); KGHO (1999); KAYO (1999–2000)
- Former frequencies: 1560 kHz (1961–1985)

Technical information
- Licensing authority: FCC
- Facility ID: 68057
- Class: C
- Power: 1,000 watts
- Transmitter coordinates: 46°57′29.3″N 123°48′39.6″W

Links
- Public license information: Public file; LMS
- Webcast: Listen live
- Website: www.1490kwok.com

KWOK (1490 AM) is a commercial radio station in Aberdeen, Washington. It is owned by Connoisseur Media, broadcasting a sports radio format and featuring programming from ESPN Radio and Westwood One.

KWOK has a power of 1,000 watts and uses a non-directional antenna. The transmitter and studios are on Coolidge Road at West Huntley Street in Aberdeen.

== History ==
The station went on the air November 16, 1961. Its original call sign was KHOK and it broadcast on 1560 kHz in Hoquiam. Because that is a clear channel frequency, KHOK was a daytimer, required to go off the air at night. On October 5, 1965, it changed its call letters to KGHO.

KGHO relocated to 1490 AM in 1985, which allowed it to broadcast around the clock. It also changed its city of license to Aberdeen. It changed its call sign to KJET on June 1, 1995; back to KGHO on April 13, 1999; to KAYO on December 23, 1999; and to KWOK on February 18, 2000.

Logo under Fox Sports Radio affiliation

For many years, this station had a daytime power of 1,000 watts but had to reduce power at night to 250 watts. On September 23, 2016, KWOK was granted an FCC construction permit to increase night power to 1,000 watts.
