= Ida Soule Kuhn =

American social and political activist

- Born: Ida Soule Howes; 1869; Illinois, U.S.
- Died: November 19, 1952 (aged 82–83); Hoquiam, Washington, U.S.
- Burial place: Sunset Memorial Park
- Education: University of Washington (BS, MS)
- Occupation(s): Historian; social and political activist
- Organizations: Daughters of the American Revolution (Robert Gray Chapter); Mayflower Society; Order of Americans of Armorial Descent; Americans of Royals Descent; American Association of University Women; Hoquiam Business and Professional Women's Club
- Spouse: Albert Henry Kuhn (after 1900)
- Children: Son

Ida Soule Kuhn (born Ida Soule Howes; 1869–November 19, 1952) was a social and political activist from Hoquiam, Washington. Kuhn was an honorary member of and occupied managerial positions in a number of famous American social organizations. An activist and speaker, she publicly expressed her pro-American political beliefs during World Wars I and II.

Kuhn was an active member of the Daughters of the American Revolution (DAR). She occupied every position existent within the organization and, in 1903, founded the first DAR chapter in southwestern Washington, in Hoquiam. It was named the Robert Gray Chapter. Kuhn was a nominee for the position of DAR Washington State Regent several times, and was elected for a one-year term in 1908. She co-founded the Washington State Chapter of the Mayflower Society as its charter member and historian. She was a co-founder of the Grays Harbor Chapter of the American Association of University Women.

During World War I, Kuhn travelled extensively around Europe and Asia, observing as different countries prepared for war. She presented her political views as the speaker at DAR assemblies during both World Wars, emphasizing the necessity to fight any kind of propaganda, such as pro-German or anti-American.

== Early life, family and education ==
Ida Kuhn was born in Illinois in 1869. She was the daughter of Frances Fensley and Joseph Soule, a shipbuilder from Freeport, Maine. She had several siblings: John Fensley Soule, who was a secretary of the Northwestern Lumber Company; Sarah Soule McMillan; Captain Thomas Soule; and Josiah Onslow Stearns.

The Soule family's ancestry on both sides was wide. It could be traced back to Childeric I, King of the Franks, and included many other historical figures, such as Philip Schuyler, a General in the Revolutionary War; Timothy Pickering, the third United States Secretary of State; John Wheelwright, English clergyman; and others.

Kuhn graduated from the New York Normal School in Oneonta, New York and she received Bachelor of Science and Master of Science degrees from the University of Washington.

== Career ==
=== Daughters of the American Revolution ===
On March 7, 1903, Kuhn became the founder or Organizing Regent of the Robert Gray Chapter of Daughters of the American Revolution organization in Hoquiam, Washington. The sixth chapter in the state, it was the first chapter founded in the southwest Washington State. The chapter began with twelve members, including Kuhn and two of her sisters.

Over the years, Kuhn worked at every position available in the DAR. In 1907, she was the state assembly treasurer, and was nominated for the position of DAR Washington State Regent. She won at the state assembly; however, at the national assembly, the votes were divided equally between her and another nominee. Due to the tie, the previous regent stayed in the position for one more year. The following year, Kuhn was nominated again, and this time was elected to the position, serving one year.

=== Washington State Society of Mayflower Descendants ===
By 1912, Kuhn became a co-founder, charter member, and historian for the Mayflower Society Washington State chapter. All the founders of the Robert Gray Chapter were eligible to belong to the new society, and Kuhn, as well as other DAR members, was already a member of the Mayflower Society branch in Washington, D.C. In later years, Kuhn and her brother Thomas, who was also a member, were known as honor members of the Society.

=== Career pause and post-travel activity ===
Kuhn left her positions in 1912 to travel the world, returning to the U.S. in 1916. She resumed her work for the Daughters of the American Revolution, being active in both social and political endeavors. In 1918, as a DAR assembly speaker, she emphasized the need to "purge all schools of pro-German and anti-American teachers." In 1935, with World War II approaching, Kuhn actively stood by her anti-propaganda beliefs and lobbied the question of national defense against "foreign-bred, hydra-headed subversive propaganda" at the DAR convention.

In later years, Kuhn remained an active member of the DAR and was commonly referred to as the honorary Washington State Regent.

=== Other memberships and positions ===
Besides her memberships in the DAR and the Mayflower Society, Kuhn was a member of the Order of Americans of Armorial Descent, Americans of Royals Descent, and the Hoquiam Business and Professional Women's Club. She was founder and president of the Grays Harbor Branch of the American Association of University Women.

== Personal life and death ==
In 1900, Ida Soule Howes married Albert Henry Kuhn, Washington state pioneer and lumberman. They had a son in 1939.

In July 1912, Kuhn left Hoquiam, Washington with her husband to travel the world. They were in Europe as World War I began, and were forced to come back to the U.S. After a short time in America, they left again to visit Japan, China and India. They came back to America in 1916, sharing their travel experiences and observations of every country they had visited being "more or less in a state of preparation for national defense."

In 1917, Kuhn with her husband spent some time in California, and from there went to attend the inauguration of President Wilson.

Kuhn died on November 19, 1952, in Hoquiam, Washington, and was buried in the Sunset Memorial Park.

== See also ==
- Daughters of the American Revolution
- Mayflower Society

== Literature cited ==
- "State assembly of D. A. R. to meet", Seattle Post-Intelligencer, Seattle: Leigh S. J. Hunt, p. 4, May 29, 1907, ISSN 2379-7304, LCCN sn83045604, OCLC 9563195
- "Members of the D. A. R. plan for a convention", Seattle Post-Intelligencer, Seattle: Leigh S. J. Hunt, p. 20, March 29, 1908, ISSN 2379-7304, LCCN sn83045604, OCLC 9563195
- "Name new leader for state D. A. R.", Spokane Chronicle, Spokane: Cowles Company, p. 5, April 13, 1908, LCCN sn86072020, OCLC 14374699
- Bowron, Elizabeth M., ed. (April 30, 1910), Twelfth Report of the National Society Daughters American Revolution, vol. 12, Washington: Government Printing Office, LCCN 08036850, OCLC 706047768
- Avery, Elroy M., ed. (June 1, 1910), "Work of the Chapters: Rainier Chapter", American Monthly Magazine, vol. XXXVI, no. 6, Washington, D. C.: Daughters of the American Revolution, pp. 742–743, LCCN 94649934, OCLC 1780024
- "Society", Seattle Post-Intelligencer, Seattle: Leigh S. J. Hunt, p. 43, July 14, 1912, ISSN 2379-7304, LCCN sn83045604, OCLC 9563195
- "Tourist points to defense needs", Seattle Daily Times, Seattle: The Seattle Times Company, p. 14, June 6, 1916, ISSN 2639-4898, LCCN sn86072007, OCLC 1765328
- "Tales of the town Tersely told", Aberdeen Herald, Aberdeen, p. 5, March 2, 1917, ISSN 2331-9682, LCCN sn87093220, OCLC 17196902
- "A. H. Kuhn buys Hoquiam mill", Aberdeen Herald, Aberdeen, p. 1, March 30, 1917, ISSN 2331-9682, LCCN sn87093220, OCLC 17196902
- "Purge our schools", The Leavenworth Echo, Leavenworth: D. H. Mayar & I. W. Laden, p. 4, April 12, 1918, ISSN 2157-4812, LCCN sn87093039, OCLC 16996294
- "Hoquiam business girls here for state convention", Spokane Chronicle, Spokane: Cowles Company, p. 10, June 5, 1924, LCCN sn86072020, OCLC 14374699
- "Share state D. A. R. sessions here", The Spokesman-Review, Spokane: Cowles Company, p. 10, April 3, 1931, ISSN 1064-7317, LCCN sn84024754, OCLC 11102610
- "Defense goal set by D. A. R.", Spokane Chronicle, Spokane: Cowles Company, p. 18, March 29, 1935, LCCN sn86072020, OCLC 14374699
- "Sisters also mothers", The Spokesman-Review, vol. 37, no. 305, Spokane: Cowles Company, p. 3, January 1, 1939, ISSN 1064-7317, LCCN sn84024754, OCLC 11102610
- "Mrs. Sherman asks unity to preserve democracy", Seattle Post-Intelligencer, Seattle: Leigh S. J. Hunt, p. 10, October 1, 1941, ISSN 0745-970X, LCCN sn83045605, OCLC 3734418
- "Mayflower descendants to dine", Seattle Daily Times, Seattle: The Seattle Times Company, p. 59, March 8, 1953, ISSN 2639-4898, LCCN sn86072007, OCLC 1765328
- Hall, Mary Rose, ed. (April 1, 1983), "With the Chapters", Daughters of the American Revolution magazine, vol. 117, no. 4, Washington, D.C.: National Society of the Daughters of the American Revolution, pp. 410–519, ISSN 0011-7013, LCCN 14019571, OCLC 9004073
- Prosser, William Farrand (1903), Lewis, Edward Gardner (ed.), A history of the Puget Sound country, its resources, its commerce and its people, New York City: Edward Gardner Lewis, LCCN 05013767
- Stewart, Leora C. (March 4, 1937), "What the club women are doing", Seattle Daily Times, Seattle: The Seattle Times Company, p. 13, ISSN 2639-4898, LCCN sn86072007, OCLC 1765328
