= Hoquiam River =

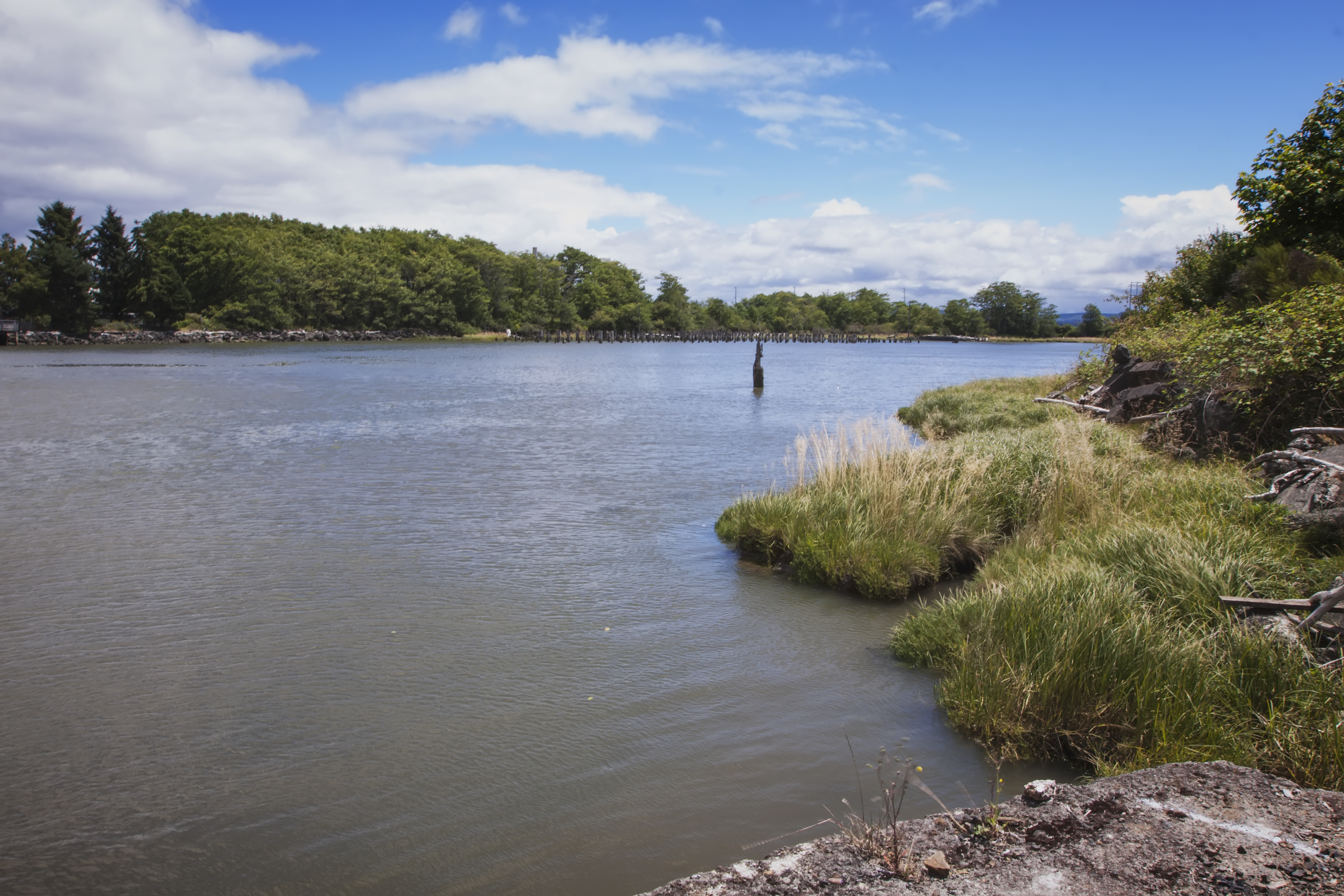
- Hoquiam River

- Location of the mouth of the Hoquiam River in Washington Hoquiam River (the United States)

Location
- Country: United States
- State: Washington
- County: Grays Harbor

Physical characteristics
- Source: Confluence of West Fork and East Fork
  - location: Willapa Hills
  - coordinates: 47°1′55″N 123°55′7″W
- Mouth: Grays Harbor
  - coordinates: 46°58′12″N 123°52′41″W
  - elevation: 0 ft (0 m)
- Length: 6 mi (9.7 km)
- Basin size: 98 sq mi (250 km^{2})

The Hoquiam River is a stream in the U.S. state of Washington. It has three main tributaries, the East Fork, West Fork, and Middle Fork Hoquiam Rivers. The main stem Hoquiam River is formed by the confluence of the West and East Forks. The Middle Fork is a tributary of the West Fork.

Most of the river's watershed lies within the Weyerhaeuser Twin Harbors Tree Farm. The City of Hoquiam owns 7,500 acres (30 km^{2}) of the watershed, including reservoirs on Davis Creek and the West Fork Hoquiam River. This reserve system serves as the source to meet Hoquiam's municipal water needs.

Along with neighboring watersheds, the Hoquiam River flows through one of the most biomass-productive zones in the world and an important forestry region. Most of the original and second-growth forests have been cut. Douglas-fir plantations have been established through the area.

Its name comes from a Native American word meaning "hungry for wood", so named from the great amount of driftwood at the mouth of the river.

== Course ==
The Hoquiam River rises in Grays Harbor County. It flows generally south to Hoquiam, where it empties into Grays Harbor, an estuary of the Pacific Ocean. The river has several significant tributaries, including the North, East, and Middle Forks, the Little Hoquiam River, and the North Fork Little Hoquiam River. These various tributaries unite near the coast, making the main stem Hoquiam River fairly short, relative to its tributaries.

The East, West, and Middle Forks all originate north of Grays Harbor and flow generally south. The East Fork Hoquiam River is the longest, at 22 mi (35 km) long. It joins the West Fork to form the main stem Hoquiam River near Hoquiam and Aberdeen. The West Fork and Middle Fork are both 9 mi (14 km) long. The West Fork is paralleled by U.S. Route 101. It joins the East Fork to form the main stem Hoquiam River. The Middle Fork is a tributary of the West Fork.

The main stem Hoquiam River, formed by the confluence of the East and West Forks, flows generally west for 6 mi (9.7 km) before emptying into Grays Harbor.

Other tributaries include the Little Hoquiam River, which originates west of Hoquiam and flows east for 6 mi (9.7 km) before joining the West Fork Hoquiam River just upstream from the confluence of the West and East Forks. The Little Hoquiam River's main tributary is the North Fork Little Hoquiam River, which is approximately as long as the Little Hoquiam River itself.

== Natural history ==
The Hoquiam River and its tributaries support runs of Chinook, chum and coho salmon, steelhead, and sea-run coastal cutthroat trout. Barriers such as culverts have been removed or replaced in recent years, allowing fish to migrate upstream farther and more easily.

== See also ==
- List of rivers of Washington (state)
