= Rennie Island =

Island in Washington, United States

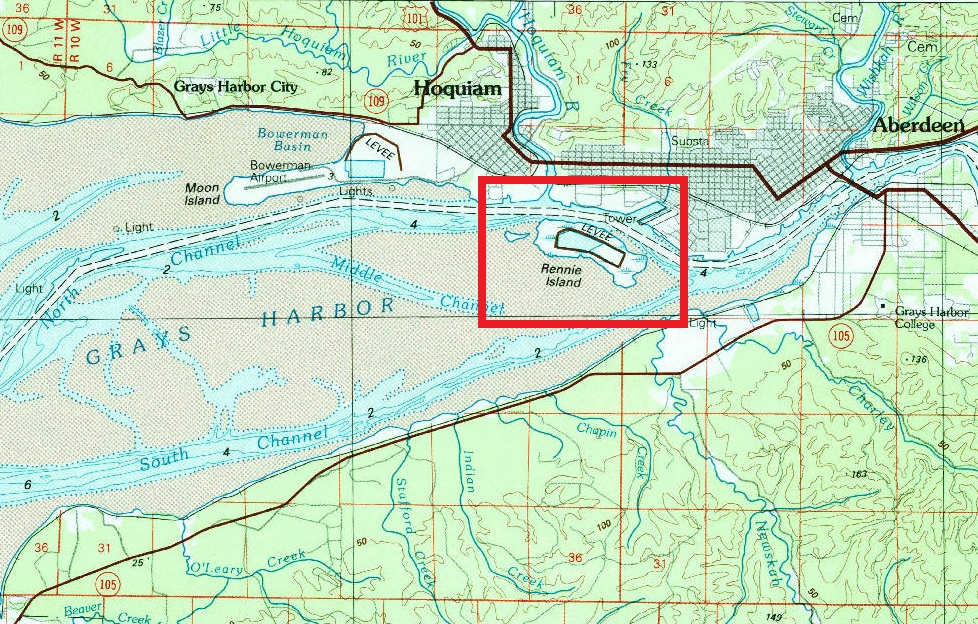
- Rennie Island (in red box)

- Location within Washington (state)

Geography
- Location: Grays Harbor
- Coordinates: 46°57′47″N 123°51′57″W
- Area: 225 acres (91 ha)
- Length: 1.0 mi (1.6 km)

Administration
- United States
- State: Washington
- County: Grays Harbor County

Rennie Island is an island in Grays Harbor, in the U.S. state of Washington. The island has been used as a treatment pond for sulfite effluent waste from local paper mills, and disposal site for dredging spoils. It was 225 acres (91 ha) in extent in the 1970s.

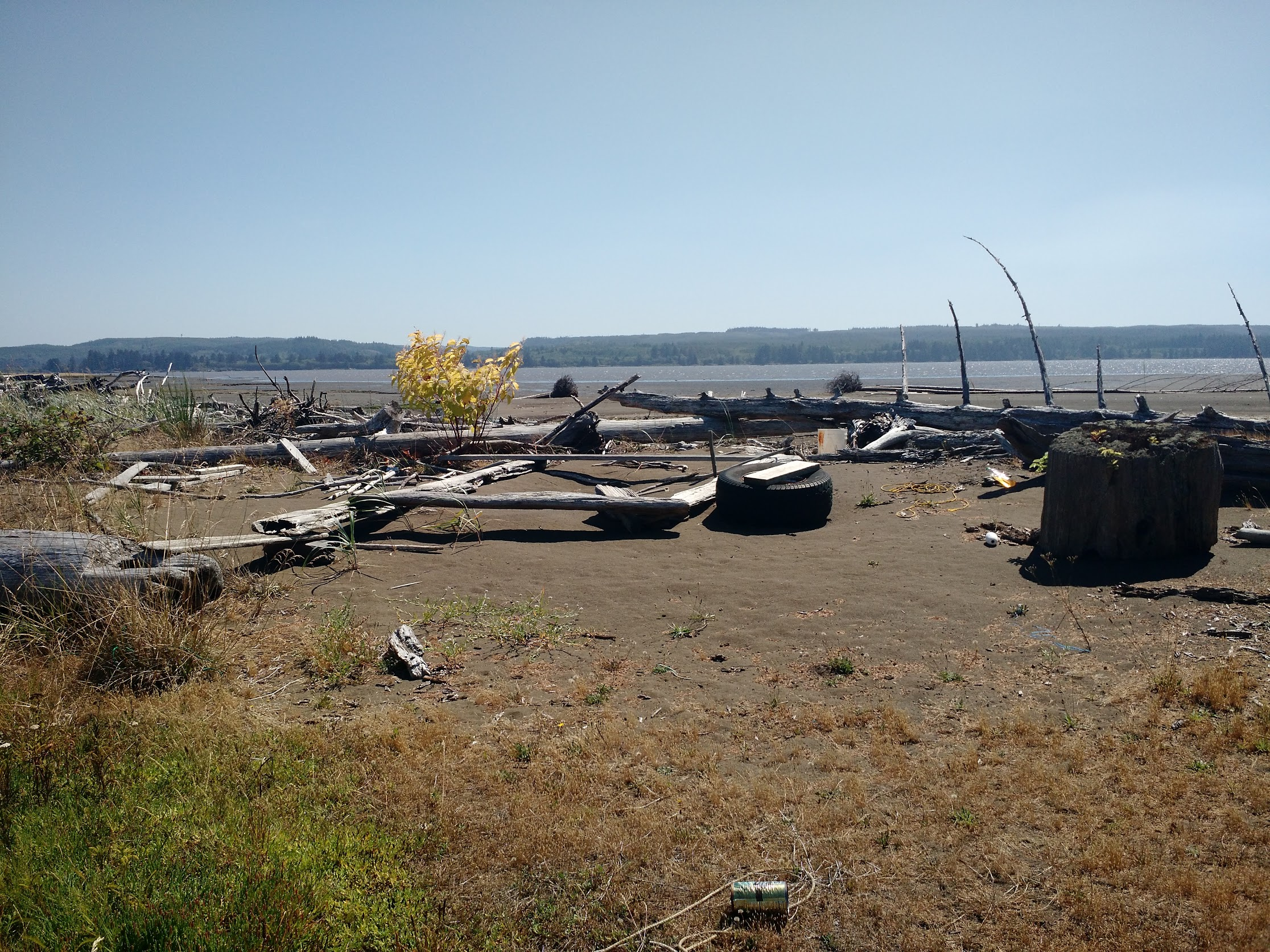
Evidence of human visitors at Stanley Island

The extreme western tip of Rennie Island is a sandy spit, a result of dredging dumps. Today this spit has grown a modest amount of vegetation, and is occasionally visited by boaters and hunters. Some locals know the spit as "Stanley Island." The spit is used as a landing for duck hunters coming ashore on the island, and its not uncommon that these hunters will build small campsites here. However, due to the very low elevation of Stanley Island, tides often wash over the entirety of the spit.
