= Schneider Creek =

Creek in Mason and Thurston County, Washington state

- Interactive map of Creek location
- Etymology: Konrad Schneider

Location
- Country: United States
- State: Washington
- County: Mason and Thurston County

Physical characteristics
- Mouth
  - location: Totten Inlet
  - coordinates: 47°05′30″N 123°04′36″W

Basin features
- Geographic Names Information System: 1508151

Schneider Creek is a stream in Mason and Thurston counties in the U.S. state of Washington. It is a tributary to Totten Inlet.

Schneider Creek was named after Konrad Schneider.

== See also ==
- Kennedy Creek Natural Area Preserve
- List of geographic features in Thurston County, Washington
