= Ink Blot Natural Area Preserve =

Natural area in Mason County, Washington state, United States of America

- Location within Washington (state)
- Location: Southwest Washington, Washington, United States
- Coordinates: 47.293°N 123.242°W
- Area: 153 acres (62 ha)
- Established: 2010
- Governing body: Washington Department of Natural Resources
- Website: dnr.wa.gov

Ink Blot Natural Area Preserve is a Washington state Natural Area Preserve located in Mason County. The preserve totals 153 acres (62 ha), mostly wetlands and Sphagnum bogs in three parallel glacier-formed basins.

The preserve was created in 2010 with a purchase by the State of Washington from a private landowner.
