= Albert Kuhn =

American businessman (1860–1934)

Albert Henry Kuhn
- Born: February 12, 1860; Waukesha, Wisconsin, US
- Died: January 5, 1934 (aged 73); Hoquiam, Washington, US
- Burial place: Sunset Memorial Park
- Education: State Normal School of Oshkosh (University of Wisconsin–Oshkosh)
- Occupations: Superintendent of the Hoquiam Lumber & Shingle Company; railroad operator and agent for the St. Paul, Minneapolis and Manitoba Railroad (the Great Northern Railway); agent for the Northern Pacific Railway
- Known for: American pioneer. Served as a log scaler for the Thurston and Lewis Counties, Lumber Inspector for District No. 5., superintendent for the Hoquiam Lumber & Shingle Company, and the manager of his own shingle mill.
- Spouse: Ida Soule Kuhn (m. 1900)

Albert Henry Kuhn (February 12, 1860 – January 5, 1934) was a Washington State pioneer and businessman. During his early career, Kuhn tried a variety of jobs, moving from state to state until he settled in Washington in 1884 and entered the logging business, where he remained for the rest of his career. He began as a logging foreman, but gained recognition in business circles over time. Eighteen years later, he was one of the founders of a new logging venture: Hoquiam Lumber and Shingle Company. In 1917, he became the manager and biggest shareholder of the Hoquiam shingle mill.

In Kuhn's first jobs, he was a teacher in Dale, Wisconsin and a telegraph operator for the Western Union in Chicago. Later, he became an experienced railroad employee, working for the St. Paul, Minneapolis and Manitoba Railroad (which was later called the Saint Paul and Pacific Railroad and then the Great Northern Railway) in Minnesota, and for the Northern Pacific Railway in Medora, North Dakota. He worked in Medora at the time of its development by Marquis de Morès, and served as a chief witness in the Marquis trial for the cattle man murder of 1883.

Eventually, Kuhn settled in Hoquiam, Washington and proceeded to work for the Northwestern Lumber Company for eighteen years. As he became known as a business specialist, he was appointed a log scaler for Thurston and Lewis Counties and Lumber Inspector for District No. 5. From 1902 to 1912, he worked for the Hoquiam Lumber and Shingle Company. He designed, and built and was one of the proprietors of the company's shingle mill, which was esteemed as the "finest" by the experts at the time. Later, as company superintendent, Kuhn built the lumber mill. From 1912 to 1916, Kuhn travelled the world. On his return, he re-entered the business and became the biggest shareholder in the Hoquiam Lumber & Shingle Company shingle mill.

== Early life, family and education ==
Kuhn was born in Waukesha, Wisconsin in 1860. Kuhn's parents were Henry Kuhn and Soloma Wellauer, both from Switzerland. There were German ancestors on both sides of the family, and Kuhn's father also had French roots. Henry Kuhn left home at 14 years old, lived for some time in France, and later emigrated to America, settling in Wisconsin and becoming a "prosperous farmer." Soloma Kuhn emigrated to America in her youth.

Soon after Albert Kuhn's birth, the family moved to Oshkosh, Wisconsin, where Kuhn grew up living on a family farm. He went to the State Normal School of Oshkosh (later the University of Wisconsin-Oshkosh. Later, he learned telegraphy while living and teaching in Dale, Wisconsin for a year.

== Career ==
=== Early positions ===
Teaching in Dale was Kuhn's first job. He taught for a year, learning telegraphy in the meantime. After his teaching term was over, he went to Chicago and became an operator for Western Union. His next position was as a railroad operator and agent in Fridley, Minnesota, for the St. Paul, Minneapolis and Manitoba Railroad (later reorganized as the Saint Paul and Pacific Railroad and then the Great Northern Railway). In 1881, Kuhn became an agent for the Northern Pacific Railway in Medora, North Dakota.

=== Hoquiam, Washington ===
Kuhn came to Hoquiam in 1884 and entered the lumber business. For eighteen years, he worked as a logging foreman for the Northwestern Lumber Company, and helped with some managerial work. Over the years, he gained respect in the field, and in 1893, was appointed as a log scaler for Thurston and Lewis counties and Lumber Inspector for District No. 5.

He played an important role in the formation of the Hoquiam Lumber and Shingle Company. In 1902, he designed and built the company's shingle mill and became one of its proprietors. The mill required less investment and provided better products in quality and quantity than other mills in the region, cutting 400,000 shingles per day. These advantages prompted the experts to call it "the finest mill of the kind in the northwest." A few days after the mill started working, Kuhn broke his leg while managing the working process.

By 1903, Kuhn became a superintendent of the Hoquiam Lumber and Shingle Company and started building its new large lumber mill. He was superintendent until 1912, when he quit in order to travel the world with his wife.

After Kuhn's return to America, he re-entered the business. In 1917, he bought a controlling share in the shingle mill of the Hoquiam Lumber & Shingle Company, separating this property from the company's lumber mill. After the transfer, the shingle mill and its attached grounds, including 1,000 feet (300 m) of waterfront, were under Kuhn's management.

== Travels ==
Over the years, Kuhn travelled extensively. In his early years, he lived and worked in several states, moving from Wisconsin to Illinois, then to Minnesota and to North Dakota. In 1883, he came to the Pacific coast and sailed from San Francisco to Australia. Eventually, he returned to America and settled in Hoquiam, Washington in 1884.

In 1912, Kuhn and his wife left America to travel around Europe. They were forced to leave and return to the U.S. due to the beginning of World War I. However, they soon left again, spending two years in Japan, China and India. In 1916, the Kuhns came home to Washington State, sharing their experiences and emphasizing the "state of preparation for national defense" in every country they had visited. Later, they spent some time in California, and in 1917, attended President Wilson's inauguration in Washington, D.C.

== Marquis de Morès murder trial ==
In the early 1880s, Kuhn worked as an agent for the Northern Pacific Railway in Medora, North Dakota when the development of the area was tightly connected to the two "fellow ranchers" – Marquis de Morès, the founder of Medora town, and Theodore Roosevelt, who often stayed there at his famous Elkhorn Ranch.

Marquis de Morès founded the town of Medora. He operated a meat manufacture and distribution business from his ranch, Chateau de Mores. During his life, Marquis "could not escape controversy;" he was a famous gunslinger and on trial for three murders. In 1885, de Mores was indicted for the murder of cowboy Riley Luffsey, which happened as a result of the altercation between three cowboys and de Mores over the property in Medora in 1883. As Kuhn was the key witness of the incident, he testified at the subsequent trial, which led to the Marquis' acquittal.

== Personal life and death ==
Kuhn married Ida Soule Kuhn from Hoquiam, Washington in 1900. She was the founder and regent of the Robert Gray Chapter of the Daughters of the American Revolution and a member of the Mayflower Society.

Kuhn died on January 5, 1934, in Hoquiam, Washington. He was buried in Sunset Memorial Park.

== Literature cited ==
- "A millionaire cattleman indicted for murder", The Weekly Times-Democrat, New Orleans: Times-Democrat Pub. Co., p. 4, August 22, 1885, LCCN sn87060164, OCLC 15152047
- "Albert H. Kuhn appointed log scaler", Seattle Post-Intelligencer, Seattle: Leigh S. J. Hunt, p. 2, March 26, 1893, ISSN 2379-7304, LCCN sn83045604, OCLC 9563195
- Murphy, John Miller, ed. (March 31, 1893), "Executive appointments", The Washington Standard, Olympia: McClatchy, p. 3, ISSN 2379-7339, LCCN sn84022770, OCLC 10580261
- "Suffers broken leg", Seattle Post-Intelligencer, Seattle: Leigh S. J. Hunt, p. 9, July 30, 1902, ISSN 2379-7304, LCCN sn83045604, OCLC 9563195
- Matthews, George E., ed. (July 30, 1902), "De Mores revenged", Buffalo Morning Express, Buffalo: J. N. Matthews, p. 1, LCCN sn85042195, OCLC 11890854
- Baird, J. H., ed. (October 1, 1908), "Another Big Class in Washington", The Bulletin: a monthly journal devoted to the interests of Hoo-Hoo, vol. XIV, no. 156, Nashville: Concatenated Order of Hoo-Hoo, pp. 61–62, OCLC 5134359
- "Tourist points to defense needs", Seattle Daily Times, Seattle: The Seattle Times Company, p. 14, June 6, 1916, ISSN 2639-4898, LCCN sn86072007, OCLC 1765328
- "Tales of the town Tersely told", Aberdeen Herald, Aberdeen, p. 5, March 2, 1917, ISSN 2331-9682, LCCN sn87093220, OCLC 17196902
- "A. H. Kuhn buys Hoquiam mill", Aberdeen Herald, Aberdeen, p. 1, March 30, 1917, ISSN 2331-9682, LCCN sn87093220, OCLC 17196902
- Wishart, David J., ed. (2004), Encyclopedia of the Great Plains, Lincoln: University of Nebraska Press, ISBN 0803247877, LCCN 2003021037, OCLC 474674820
- Leppart, Gary (2007), Medora and Theodore Roosevelt National Park, Images of America, Charleston: Arcadia Publishing, ISBN 978-0738551296, LCCN 2006940518, OCLC 146500806
- Prosser, William Farrand (1903), Lewis, Edward Gardner (ed.), A history of the Puget Sound country, its resources, its commerce and its people, New York City: Edward Gardner Lewis, LCCN 05013767
