= Grays Harbor =

Estuary in the U.S. state of Washington

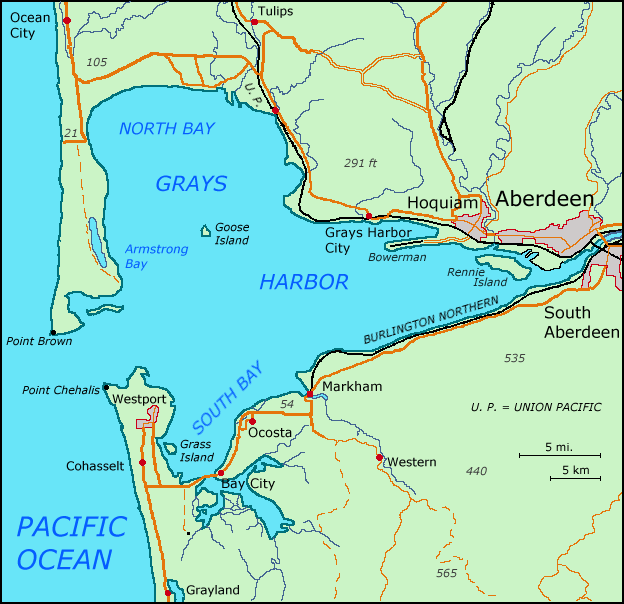
Map of Grays Harbor

Grays Harbor is an estuarine bay located 45 miles (72 km) north of the mouth of the Columbia River, on the southwest Pacific coast of Washington state, in the United States. It is a ria, which formed at the end of the last ice age, when sea levels flooded the Chehalis River. The bay is 17 miles (27 km) long and 12 miles (19 km) wide. The Chehalis River flows into its eastern end, where the city of Aberdeen stands at that river's mouth, on its north bank, with the somewhat smaller city of Hoquiam immediately to its northwest, along the bayshore. Besides the Chehalis, many lesser rivers and streams flow into Grays Harbor, such as the Hoquiam River and Humptulips River. A pair of low peninsulas separate it from the Pacific Ocean, except for an opening about two miles (3 km) in width. The northern peninsula, which is largely covered by the community of Ocean Shores, ends in Point Brown. Facing that across the bay-mouth is Point Chehalis, at the end of the southern peninsula upon which stands the town of Westport.

Grays Harbor is named after Captain Robert Gray, who entered it on May 7, 1792, in the course of his fur-trading voyages along the north Pacific coast of North America. Gray named the bay Bullfinch Harbor, but it was afterward named Gray's Harbor by Captain George Vancouver, whose contemporaneous explorations of the region—the ships of the two captains had met at sea, only days earlier—were well publicised at the time, while Gray's voyages were not. Gray's Harbor was the name that stuck (the apostrophe was omitted under US Board on Geographic Names guidelines). A few days later, on May 11, Gray found a navigable channel into the estuary of the Columbia River, and sailed into it, the first white man known to have done so.

Settlement of the area began in the early 1870s and was largely dependent on the lumber industry. As the forests of the eastern United States depleted, many loggers from the East and the Midwest migrated to the Grays Harbor area, as well as many Scandinavians and Finns from Europe.

Grays Harbor National Wildlife Refuge is located on 1,500 acres (6.1 km^{2}) of intertidal mudflats, salt marsh, and uplands around Hoquiam.

The Daily Washingtonian was a daily newspaper in Grays Harbor founded by Otis M. Moore.

== Islands and sandbars ==
Islands include:

- Grass Island (46°52′34″N 124°05′27″W), near Westport
- Rennie Island, near Aberdeen, the largest at 225 acres (91 ha)
- Sand Island, a seasonally submerged sand bar in the north bay, almost at the center of Grays Harbor
- Goose Island (46°58′38″N 124°04′13″W), immediately adjacent to Sand Island in the north bay

Protection Island (46°56′39″N 124°07′34″W) is listed by USGS, but as of 2018 is listed by the City of Ocean Shores as an accreted landform called Damon Point, a 61-acre (25 ha) park attached to Point Brown.

Named bars include Whitcomb Flats (46°54′39″N 124°04′54″W), near Westport. A large unnamed bar or island (46.911°N 124.007°W) also stands off of Markham at the mouth of Johns River.

Sand Island, Goose Island and Whitcomb Flats are included in Washington Natural Areas Program. Johns River Wildlife Area, managed by Washington State Department of Fish and Wildlife, includes the Markham island.

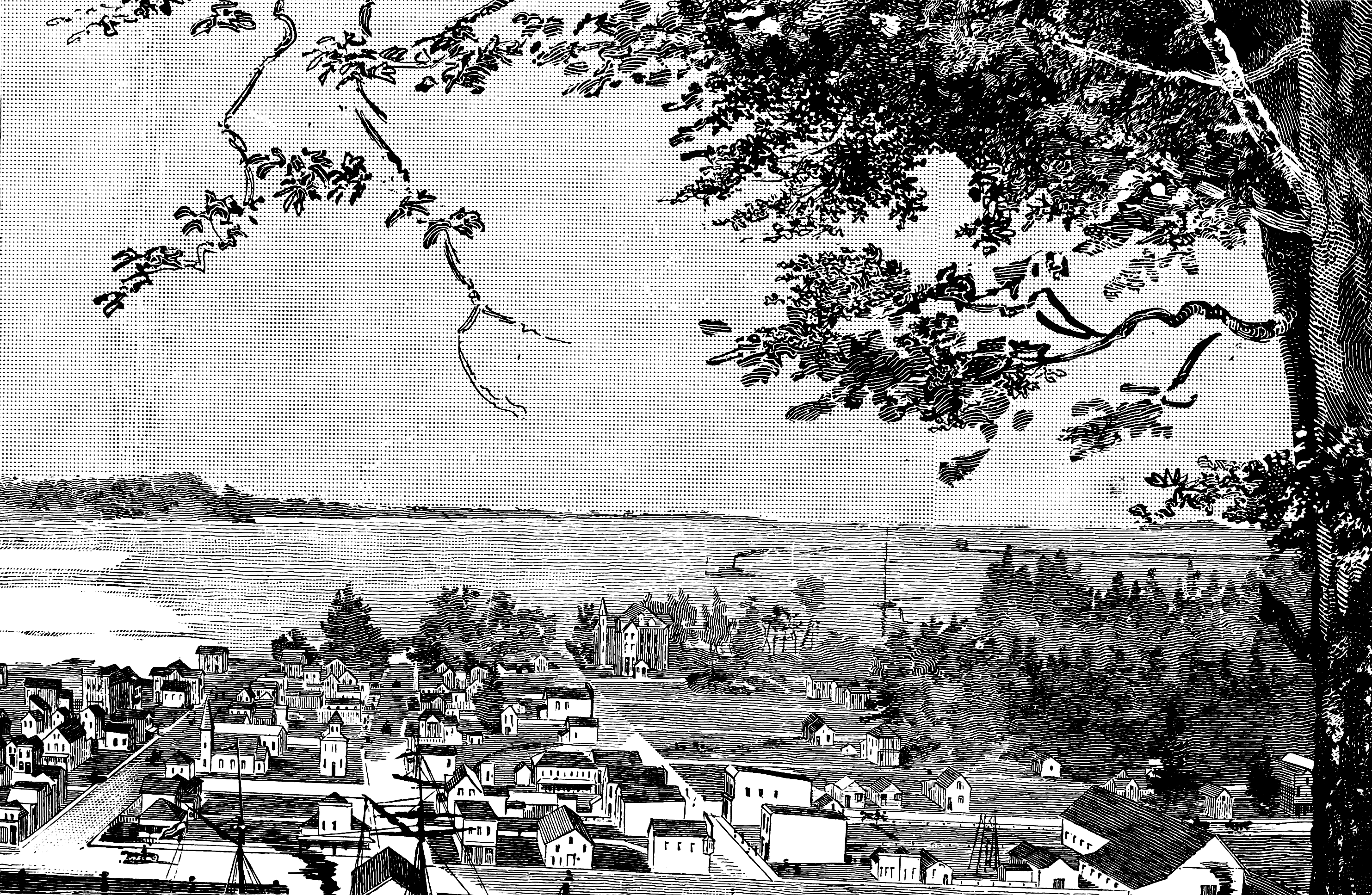
Grays Harbor in 1891 (or earlier?) viewed from Hoquiam, as depicted in Frances Fuller Victor's Atlantis Arisen.

== Historic events ==
In the early 20th century, Grays Harbor was the largest lumber shipyard in the world. The Industrial Workers of the World led strikes in the area in 1912, 1917, and 1923. Some of these labor actions were militant, such as an armed union ship in 1906 shooting at the Fearless, a scab ship.

The schooner Annie Larsen was seized at Grays Harbor on 25 June 1915 by US customs officials, later leading to what was at the time the most expensive trial in US legal history.

During World War II, harbor defenses including searchlights, 12-inch coast defense mortar, 155 mm howitzers and other guns were emplaced around Grays Harbor by Western Defense Command (see 56th Air Defense Artillery Regiment).

== See also ==
- Grays Harbor County, Washington
