= Bowerman Airport =

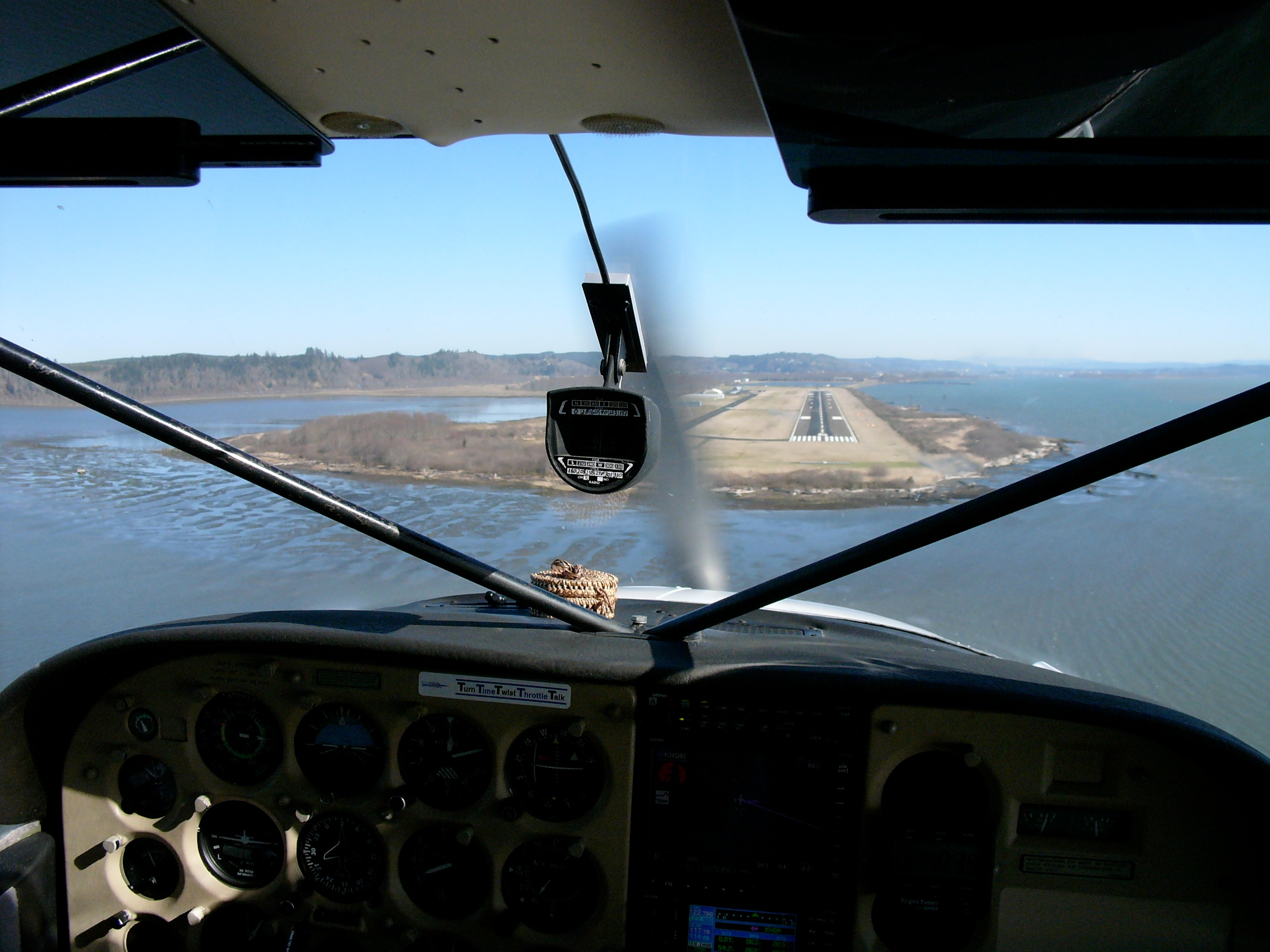
- IATA: HQM; ICAO: KHQM; FAA LID: HQM

Summary
- Airport type: Public
- Owner: Port of Grays Harbor
- Serves: Hoquiam, Washington
- Elevation AMSL: 14 ft (4.3 m)
- Coordinates: 46°58′16″N 123°56′12″W
- Interactive map of Bowerman Airport

Runways
Direction	Length		Surface
Direction	ft	m	Surface
6/24	5,000	1,524	Asphalt

Statistics (2011)
- Aircraft operations: 25,375
- Based aircraft: 25
- Sources: Airport website and FAA

Bowerman Airport (IATA: HQM, ICAO: KHQM, FAA LID: HQM), also known as Bowerman Field, is a public use airport located 2 miles (3 km) west of the central business district of Hoquiam, a city in Grays Harbor County, Washington, United States. It is owned by the Port of Grays Harbor. According to the FAA's National Plan of Integrated Airport Systems for 2009–2013, it is classified as a general aviation airport.

== History ==
The Grays Harbor County government selected a site west of Hoquiam to build an airport in 1941 using federal funding for civil defense. The airport, named Moon Island Airport, was converted into an army airfield in 1942 and expanded with two runways during World War II. It was renamed for pilot Robert C. Bowerman in 1953 after his death during the Korean War. The Port of Grays Harbor acquired the airport in 1962.

== Facilities and aircraft ==
Bowerman Airport covers an area of 145 acres (59 ha) at an elevation of 18 feet (5 m) above mean sea level. It has one runway designated 6/24 with an asphalt surface measuring 5,000 by 150 feet (1,524 m × 46 m).

For the 12-month period ending May 31, 2011, the airport had 24,625 aircraft operations, an average of 69 per day: 97% general aviation and 3% military. At that time there were 25 aircraft based at this airport, all single-engine. Bowerman Field airport has fueling facilities and is the only jet-capable airport on the Washington coast. The airport has an instrument landing approach system for use in instrument meteorological conditions.

== See also ==
- List of airports in Washington
