= SS America (1869) =

History

United States
- Name: SS America
- Operator: Pacific Mail Steamship Company
- Builder: Henry Steers, Greenpoint, Brooklyn
- Cost: $1,250,000
- Laid down: 1868
- Launched: 1869
- Fate: Destroyed by fire, August 24, 1872

General characteristics
- Tonnage: 4,454 tons
- Length: 363 ft (111 m)
- Beam: 49 ft (15 m)
- Draft: 18 ft (5.5 m)
- Depth of hold: 31 ft (9.4 m)
- Propulsion: Beam engine, 3,000 nhp
- Capacity: 92 passengers
- Crew: 103

SS America (1869–1872) was a ship for Pacific Mail Steamship Company operating on the China Line along with the SS Colorado, SS Great Republic, SS China, SS Alaska, SS Japan and spare steamer SS Herman. The America, which was one of the largest paddle wheel steamers in the world, was valued by Pacific Mail Steamship Company at $1,017,942 or about $40,000 less than the SS Great Republic or SS Japan.

== Construction ==
America was built in 1868–1869 by Henry Steers's shipyard (see George Steers and Co), at Greenpoint, Long Island, and was 4,454 tons. Length 363 feet; beam of hull 49 feet (wide) and 31 feet deep in hold, draft of water 18 feet. She had a beam engine, with 105-inch cylinder and twelve feet stroke of piston, the engine working up to 3,000 nominal horse-power.

At Bridgewater Iron Manufacturing Company were forged the large forgings for most of the ships of this time including America. The ship was built by George Steers and Co (New York) started in 1868, and finished in 1869. The ship cost $1,250,000.

== Trips ==
America was the pioneer of the China Line and was followed quickly by SS Japan, SS Great Republic and SS China.

She traveled around the Cape of Good Hope without passengers and used sail for a large part of the trip. At Singapore, America began to pick up Chinese for steerage passage and eventually arrived in San Francisco on 20 October 1869 with 730 immigrants.

=== Iwakura Mission ===
On December 23, 1871, the Japanese Iwakura Mission boarded the ship in Yokohama harbor. The Japanese described the ship as follows:

Our ship called the America. Reputed to be the most elegant vessel in the Pacific Mail Steamship Company fleet, the America was 363 feet long, 57 feet wide and 23 feet deep, with 8 feet above the deck.[…] Its displacement was 4,554 tons. There were 30 first-class cabins and 16 second-class ones - 46 in all. The vessel could carry 92 passengers. Under Captain Doane were 24 officers and 79 sailors and stewards, making a complement of 103. The ship was powered by a balance-wheel steam-engine driving external paddle-wheels.

== Destruction ==
TSS America was lost by fire on August 24, 1872, in Yokohama harbor, Japan after her eleventh voyage starting on August 1, 1872, from San Francisco to Yokohama and Hong Kong, China. Captain Seth Doane had inspected the ship before 10 o'clock. A loss of 19 to 70 lives occurred depending on the source. The monetary loss was estimated at $2,000,000.
