= Chehalis people =

Chehalis people may refer to:

- Lower Chehalis people
- Upper Chehalis people
- Confederated Tribes of the Chehalis Reservation, a federally recognized tribe of Upper Chehalis and Lower Chehalis people
- Sts'ailes people, formerly called the Chehalis
