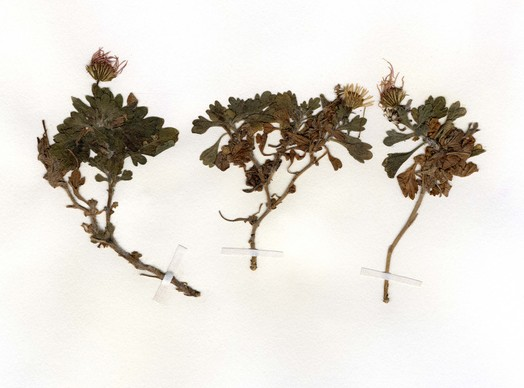
- herbarium specimen

Conservation status
- Imperiled (NatureServe)

Scientific classification
- Kingdom: Plantae
- Clade: Tracheophytes
- Clade: Angiosperms
- Clade: Eudicots
- Clade: Asterids
- Order: Asterales
- Family: Asteraceae
- Genus: Erigeron
- Species: E. basalticus

Binomial name
- Erigeron basalticus Hoover

= Erigeron basalticus =

Species of flowering plant

Erigeron basalticus is a species of flowering plant in the family Asteraceae known by the common names basalt fleabane and basalt daisy. It is endemic to Washington state in the United States, where it is known only from the banks of the Yakima River and its tributaries in Yakima and Kittitas Counties.

This perennial herb grows from a taproot and branching caudex, producing spreading or hanging stems up to 25 centimeters long. They are leafy, hairy, and glandular. The leaves have wedge-shaped or oval blades with three lobes and are hairy in texture. The hairy flower head contains white ray florets that develop a pinkish tinge as they dry. There are yellow disc florets at the center. Blooming occurs in May through October.

This plant grows on basalt cliffs located in and around the Yakima River canyon on the Columbia Plateau in Washington. The whole distribution of the plant is within an area 17 kilometers long by 4.5 wide.

Threats to the rare plant include mining of basalt rock, railroad and highway maintenance, dam maintenance, and agricultural chemicals, but there are no imminent threats to the survival of the species. There are an estimated 13,805 individuals in total, located within good-sized populations that appear to be stable.
