= Sand Island (Washington) =

Island in Grays Harbor, Washington, United States

- Location within Washington (state)

Geography
- Location: Grays Harbor
- Coordinates: 46°57′42″N 124°03′30″W

Administration
- United States
- State: Washington
- County: Grays Harbor County

Sand Island is an island in Grays Harbor, in the U.S. state of Washington. The entire island is occupied by Sand Island Natural Area Preserve, a protected area under the State Department of Natural Resources' Washington Natural Areas Program. The small sandy island is seasonally overtopped by the salt waters of the harbor.
