= Washington Natural Areas Program =

Washington (U.S. state) conservation program

The Washington Natural Areas Program, part of the Washington Department of Natural Resources, manages dozens of natural areas owned by the U.S. state of Washington. These areas have received funding through the state's general fund since the Washington State Legislature enacted the Natural Areas Preserve Act in 1972. As of May 2022, there are 58 Natural Area Preserves and 39 Natural Resources Conservation Areas. The program's goals are to protect rare and outstanding examples of Washington's widely varied ecosystems, maintain the state's biological diversity, support education and scientific research, and provide public opportunities for low-impact recreation.

== See also ==
- List of Washington Natural Area Preserves
- List of Washington Natural Resources Conservation Areas
