= Hoquiam, Washington =

- City
- City of Hoquiam
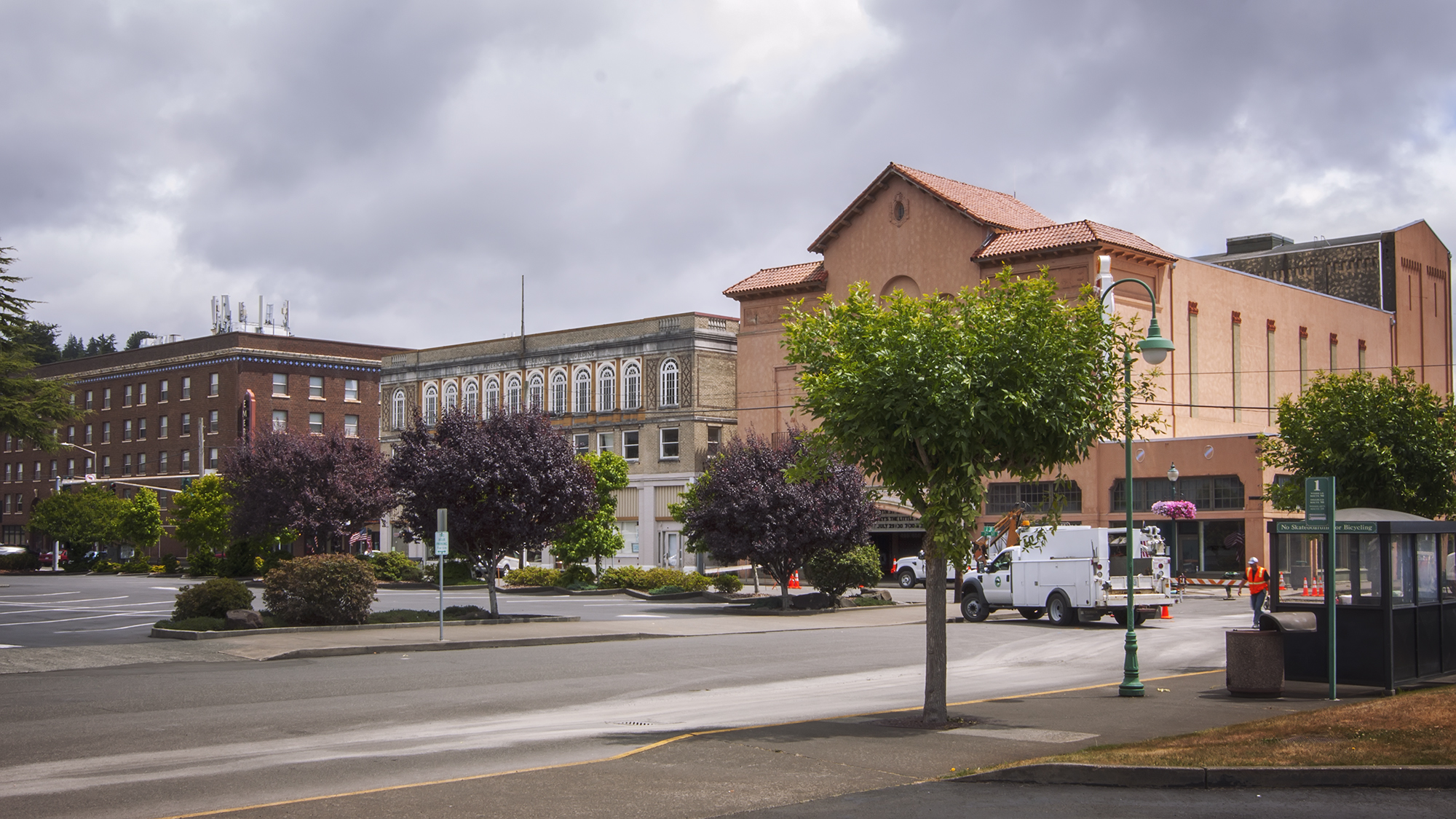
- Downtown Hoquiam

- Location of Hoquiam, Washington
- Coordinates: 46°59′15″N 123°53′28″W
- Country: United States
- State: Washington
- County: Grays Harbor
- Established: 1867
- Incorporated: May 21, 1890

Government
  - Type: Mayor–council
  - Mayor: Ben Winkelman

Area
  - City: 16.42 sq mi (42.54 km^{2})
  - Land: 9.54 sq mi (24.72 km^{2})
  - Water: 6.88 sq mi (17.82 km^{2})
- Elevation: 13 ft (4.0 m)

Population (2020)
  - City: 8,776
  - Estimate (2022): 8,798
  - Density: 906.9/sq mi (350.15/km^{2})
  - Metro: 77,038
- Time zone: UTC-8 (Pacific (PST))
  - Summer (DST): UTC-7 (PDT)
- ZIP Code: 98550
- Area code(s): 360, 564
- FIPS code: 53-32300
- GNIS feature ID: 2410792
- Website: cityofhoquiam.com

Hoquiam (/ˈhoʊkwiəm/ HOH-kwee-əm or /ˈhoʊkwɪm/ HOH-kwim) is a city in Grays Harbor County, Washington, United States. It borders the city of Aberdeen at Myrtle Street, with Hoquiam to the west. The two cities share a common economic history in lumbering and exporting, but Hoquiam has maintained its independent identity. It shares a long rivalry with its more populated neighbor, especially in high school sports.

Hoquiam was incorporated on May 21, 1890. Its name comes from a Native American word meaning "hungry for wood", from the great amount of driftwood at the mouth of the Hoquiam River. The population was 8,776 at the 2020 census.

== History ==
Until the early 1800s, the area now known as Hoquiam was jointly inhabited by several indigenous tribes, notably the Quinault people, the Lower Chehalis people, the Wynoochee, and the Chehalis people. A rapid decline of indigenous populations in the mid-1850s is largely attributed to the spread of European pathogens and a series of 1850s treaties that forced the indigenous population to vacate their homelands. White settlers arrived soon after, seeing an opportunity to profit off the newly acquired forests.

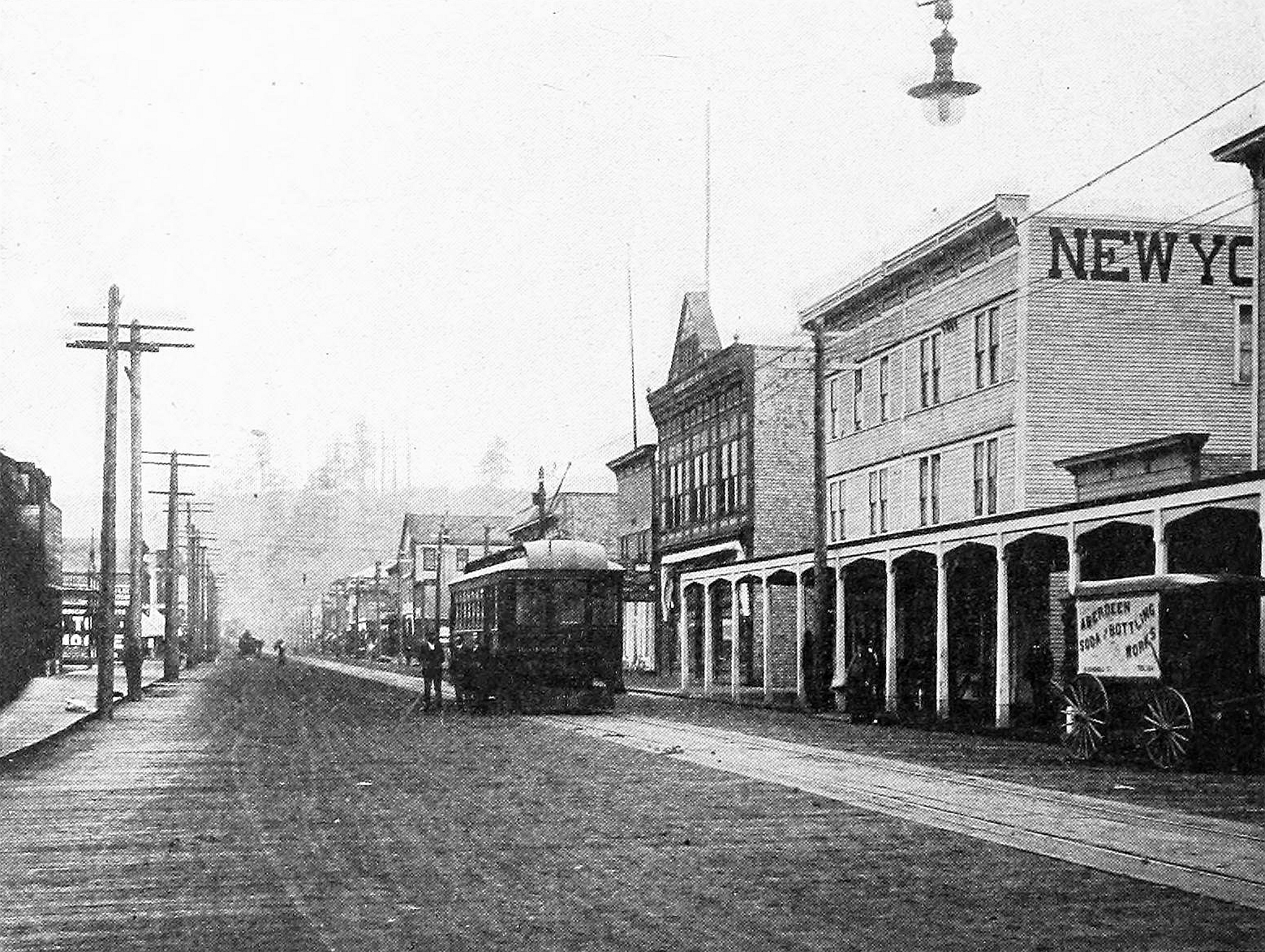
Eighth Street, 1884

One of the first logging operations in Hoquiam was established by Ed Campbell in 1872. Ten years later, the Northwestern Mill was jointly founded by lumber baron Asa M. Simpson and George H. Emerson, now known as the "father of Hoquiam". In 1881, he purchased 300 acres (120 ha) for new mill and lumber operation, and by September 1882, the Simpson mill was producing its first lumber products. In 1886, Simpson merged his mill with the already establisher Miller Brothers mill, forming the Northwest Lumber Company. Throughout the late 1800s, many service industries grew around the town's lumber industry, and in 1907, Industrial Workers of the World Industrial Union No. 276 was founded in Hoquiam.

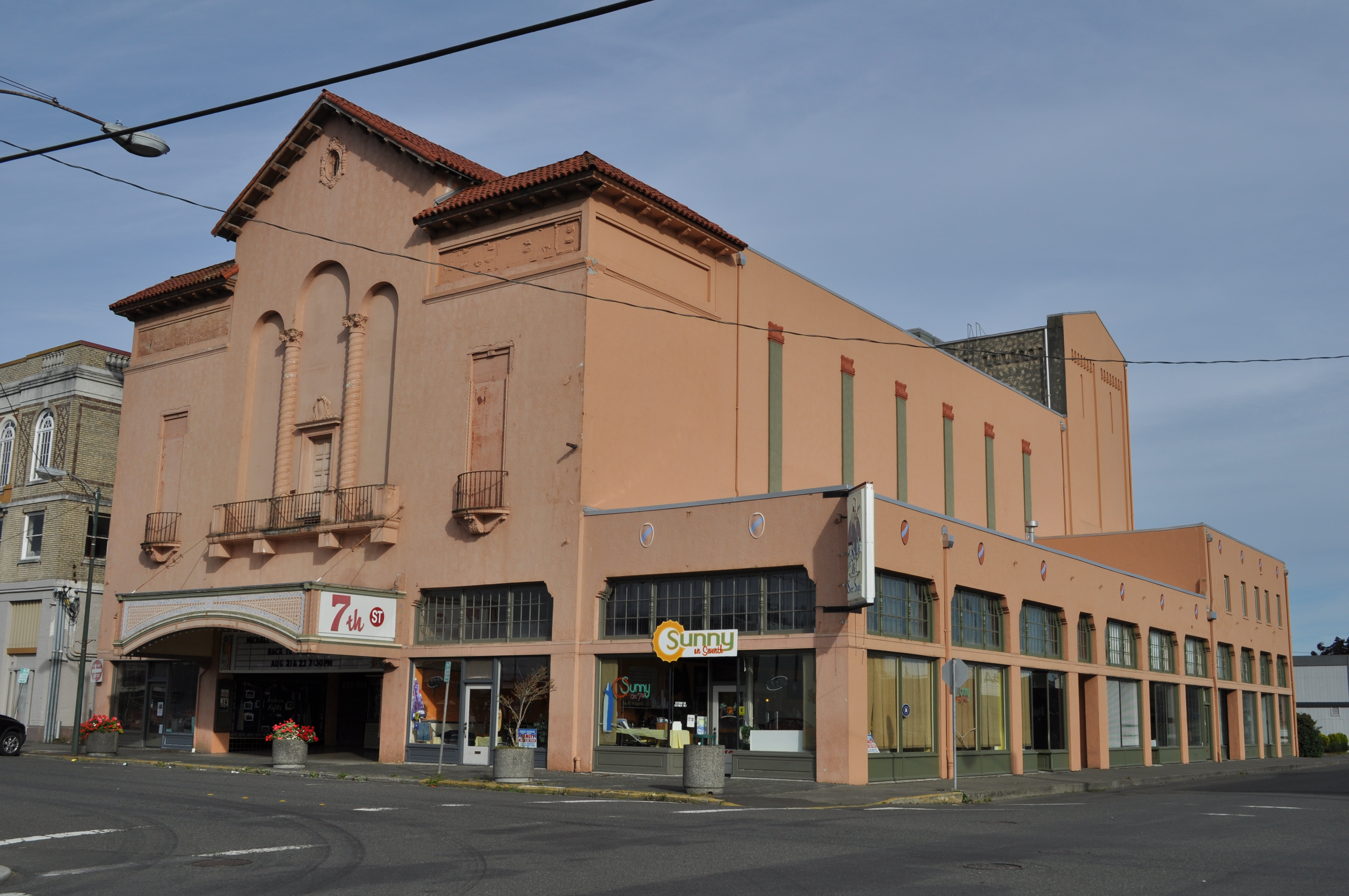
7th Street Theatre

A railroad extension from Aberdeen to Hoquiam in 1898 greatly boosted Hoquiam's economy. The town experienced a boom in the early 1900s, largely due to the completion of a railroad line from Aberdeen. Several of the town's historic structures were built during this time, including the 7th Street Theater, listed on the National Register of Historic Places in 1987. In 1927, a pulp mill was established, later merging with the Hammermill Paper Company, forming the Grays Harbor Pulp & Paper Company, and again with Rayonier Incorporated in 1936.

== Geography ==
According to the United States Census Bureau, the city has a total area of 15.60 square miles (40.40 km^{2}), of which, 9.02 square miles (23.36 km^{2}) is land and 6.58 square miles (17.04 km^{2}) is water.

=== Climate ===
Hoquiam experiences a Mediterranean climate (Köppen climate classification: Csb) that borders closely on an oceanic climate. Outside of the mild and dry summer season, rainfall is generally very high and monthly totals of over 20 inches (510 mm) are not unknown. Snowfall is rare and indeed does not fall many years; however, in the winter of 1964/1965 as much as 40.8 inches (1.0 m) of snow fell in two storms.

Climate data for Hoquiam, Washington (Bowerman Airport), 1991–2020 normals, extremes 1953–present
Month	Jan	Feb	Mar	Apr	May	Jun	Jul	Aug	Sep	Oct	Nov	Dec	Year
Record high °F (°C)	63 (17)	72 (22)	79 (26)	86 (30)	91 (33)	101 (38)	93 (34)	95 (35)	93 (34)	83 (28)	70 (21)	72 (22)	101 (38)
Mean maximum °F (°C)	55.9 (13.3)	59.4 (15.2)	65.5 (18.6)	71.9 (22.2)	77.6 (25.3)	79.0 (26.1)	81.9 (27.7)	84.2 (29.0)	82.3 (27.9)	72.7 (22.6)	60.2 (15.7)	55.0 (12.8)	88.3 (31.3)
Mean daily maximum °F (°C)	47.5 (8.6)	49.6 (9.8)	52.2 (11.2)	55.6 (13.1)	60.1 (15.6)	63.4 (17.4)	67.1 (19.5)	68.1 (20.1)	67.0 (19.4)	59.5 (15.3)	51.6 (10.9)	46.7 (8.2)	57.4 (14.1)
Daily mean °F (°C)	42.8 (6.0)	43.6 (6.4)	45.8 (7.7)	48.7 (9.3)	53.4 (11.9)	57.1 (13.9)	60.3 (15.7)	61.0 (16.1)	59.1 (15.1)	52.5 (11.4)	45.9 (7.7)	42.0 (5.6)	51.0 (10.6)
Mean daily minimum °F (°C)	38.0 (3.3)	37.6 (3.1)	39.3 (4.1)	41.9 (5.5)	46.6 (8.1)	50.8 (10.4)	53.7 (12.1)	53.9 (12.2)	51.2 (10.7)	45.5 (7.5)	40.3 (4.6)	37.3 (2.9)	44.7 (7.0)
Mean minimum °F (°C)	27.8 (−2.3)	27.8 (−2.3)	30.4 (−0.9)	32.8 (0.4)	37.1 (2.8)	43.4 (6.3)	47.4 (8.6)	47.1 (8.4)	42.7 (5.9)	34.2 (1.2)	29.7 (−1.3)	27.3 (−2.6)	23.7 (−4.6)
Record low °F (°C)	16 (−9)	13 (−11)	22 (−6)	27 (−3)	29 (−2)	36 (2)	35 (2)	40 (4)	32 (0)	27 (−3)	12 (−11)	9 (−13)	9 (−13)
Average precipitation inches (mm)	10.91 (277)	6.65 (169)	7.74 (197)	5.35 (136)	2.99 (76)	2.01 (51)	0.85 (22)	1.35 (34)	2.53 (64)	6.91 (176)	10.95 (278)	10.52 (267)	68.76 (1,747)
Average snowfall inches (cm)	1.3 (3.3)	0.8 (2.0)	trace	trace	0.0 (0.0)	0.0 (0.0)	0.0 (0.0)	0.0 (0.0)	0.0 (0.0)	0.0 (0.0)	0.4 (1.0)	0.4 (1.0)	2.9 (7.3)
Average precipitation days (≥ 0.01 in)	21.8	18.4	21.5	18.9	14.0	12.0	6.0	7.1	10.0	16.9	21.6	21.9	190.1
Average snowy days (≥ 0.1 in)	0.9	0.4	0.0	0.1	0.0	0.0	0.0	0.0	0.0	0.0	0.3	0.5	2.2
Source 1: NOAA (snow/snow days 1981–2010)
Source 2: National Weather Service

== Demographics ==
Historical population
Census	Pop.	Note	%±
1890	1,302		—
1900	2,608		100.3%
1910	8,171		213.3%
1920	10,058		23.1%
1930	12,766		26.9%
1940	10,835		−15.1%
1950	11,123		2.7%
1960	10,762		−3.2%
1970	10,466		−2.8%
1980	9,719		−7.1%
1990	8,972		−7.7%
2000	9,097		1.4%
2010	8,726		−4.1%
2020	8,776		0.6%
2022 (est.)	8,798		0.3%
U.S. Decennial Census; 2020 Census

=== 2020 census ===
As of the 2020 census, Hoquiam had a population of 8,776. The median age was 40.4 years. 22.3% of residents were under the age of 18 and 19.6% of residents were 65 years of age or older. For every 100 females there were 96.0 males, and for every 100 females age 18 and over there were 92.4 males age 18 and over.

95.7% of residents lived in urban areas, while 4.3% lived in rural areas.

There were 3,517 households in Hoquiam, of which 28.7% had children under the age of 18 living in them. Of all households, 35.1% were married-couple households, 22.0% were households with a male householder and no spouse or partner present, and 31.6% were households with a female householder and no spouse or partner present. About 31.5% of all households were made up of individuals and 15.3% had someone living alone who was 65 years of age or older.

There were 3,908 housing units, of which 10.0% were vacant. The homeowner vacancy rate was 2.3% and the rental vacancy rate was 7.5%.

Racial composition as of the 2020 census
Race	Number	Percent
White	6,779	77.2%
Black or African American	80	0.9%
American Indian and Alaska Native	432	4.9%
Asian	101	1.2%
Native Hawaiian and Other Pacific Islander	15	0.2%
Some other race	482	5.5%
Two or more races	887	10.1%
Hispanic or Latino (of any race)	1,111	12.7%

=== 2010 census ===
As of the 2010 census, there were 8,726 people, 3,480 households, and 2,119 families residing in the city. The population density was 967.4 inhabitants per square mile (373.5/km^{2}). There were 3,938 housing units at an average density of 436.6 per square mile (168.6/km^{2}). The racial makeup of the city was 85.5% White, 0.8% African American, 3.9% Native American, 1.1% Asian, 0.2% Pacific Islander, 4.2% from other races, and 4.2% from two or more races. Hispanic or Latino of any race were 9.5% of the population.

There were 3,480 households, of which 32.3% had children under the age of 18 living with them, 37.5% were married couples living together, 16.5% had a female householder with no husband present, 6.8% had a male householder with no wife present, and 39.1% were non-families. 30.7% of all households were made up of individuals, and 13.6% had someone living alone who was 65 years of age or older. The average household size was 2.48 and the average family size was 3.03.

The median age in the city was 37.6 years. 24.2% of residents were under the age of 18; 10.2% were between the ages of 18 and 24; 24.5% were from 25 to 44; 26.1% were from 45 to 64; and 15% were 65 years of age or older. The gender makeup of the city was 48.9% male and 51.1% female.

=== 2000 census ===
As of the 2000 census, there were 9,097 people, 3,640 households, and 2,245 families residing in the city. The population density was 992 people per square mile (383/km^{2}). There were 4,023 housing units, with an average density of 438.7 per square mile (169.4/km^{2}). The racial distribution of the city was 89.32% White, 5.75% Latino, 3.86% Native American, 1.18% Asian, 0.32% African-American, 0.07% Pacific Islander, 2.09% from other races, and 3.18% from two or more races. The white population breaks down as 14.6% American, 13.8% German, 9.6% Irish, 6.8% English and 5.7% Norwegian ancestry.

There were 3,640 households, of which 31.8% had children under the age of 18 living with them, 41.8% were married couples living together, 14.7% had a female head of house with no husband present, and 38.3% were non-families. 31.6% of all households were made up of individuals, and 15.4% had someone living alone who was 65 years of age or older. The average household size was 2.47 persons and the average family size was 3.09 members.

The population was aligned with 27.4% under the age of 18, 8.6% from 18 to 24, 26.6% from 25 to 44, 22.0% from 45 to 64, and 15.3% who were 65 years of age or older. The median age was 36 years. For every 100 females, there were 94.7 males. For every 100 females age 18 and over, there were 89.3 males.

The median household income was $29,658 and the median family income was $34,859. The median male income was $33,417 versus $23,558 for females. The per capita income for the city was $15,089, with 19.0% of the population and 16.1% of families living below the poverty line. Of the total population, 26.5% of those under the age of 18 and 8.9% of those 65 and older were living below the poverty line.

== Arts and culture ==
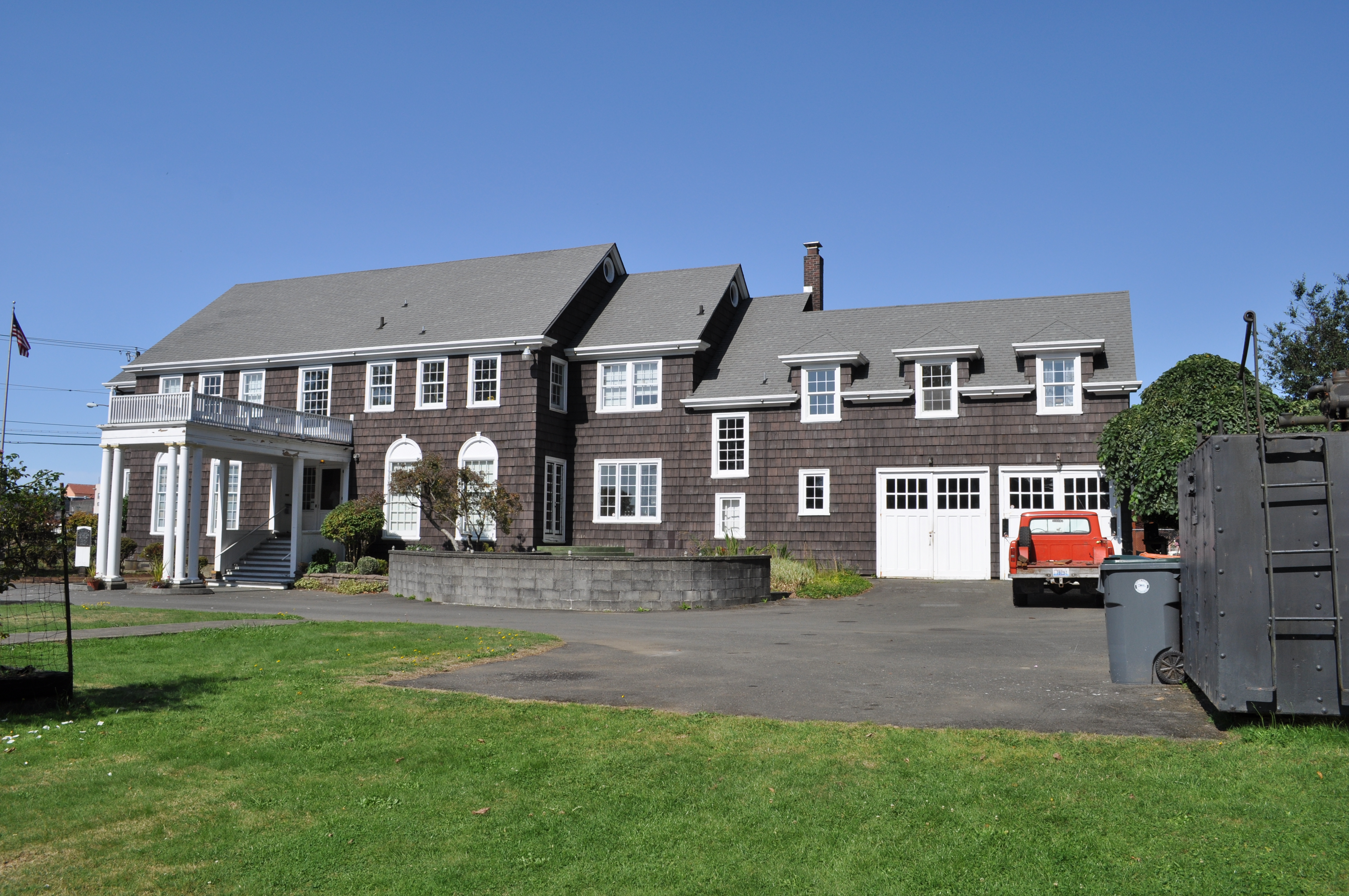
Hoquiam's Polson Museum occupies the F. Arnold Polson House and Alex Polson Grounds. The museum contains artifacts related to the history of Hoquiam and the region.

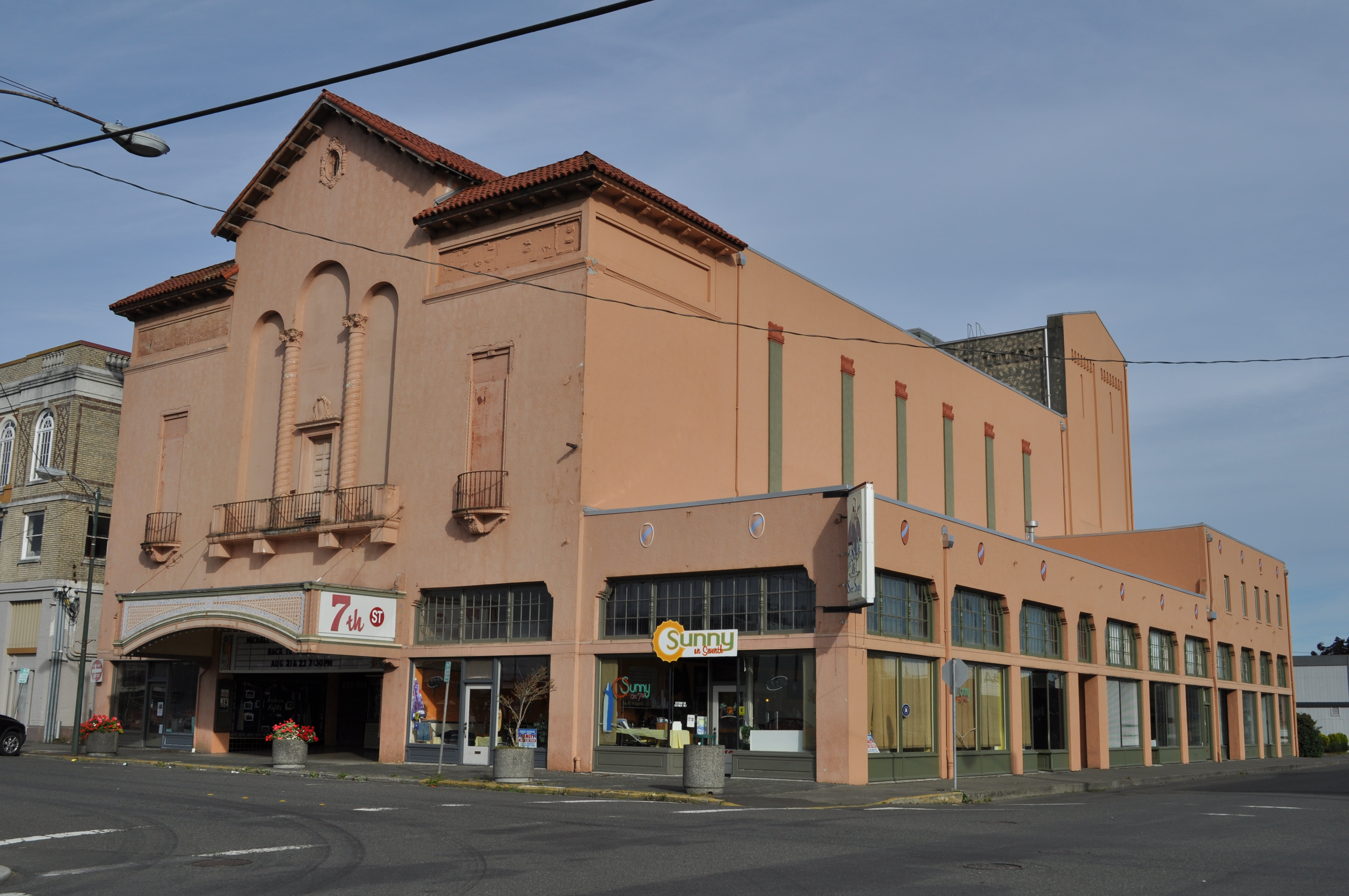
The 7th Street Theatre, listed on the National Register of Historic Places

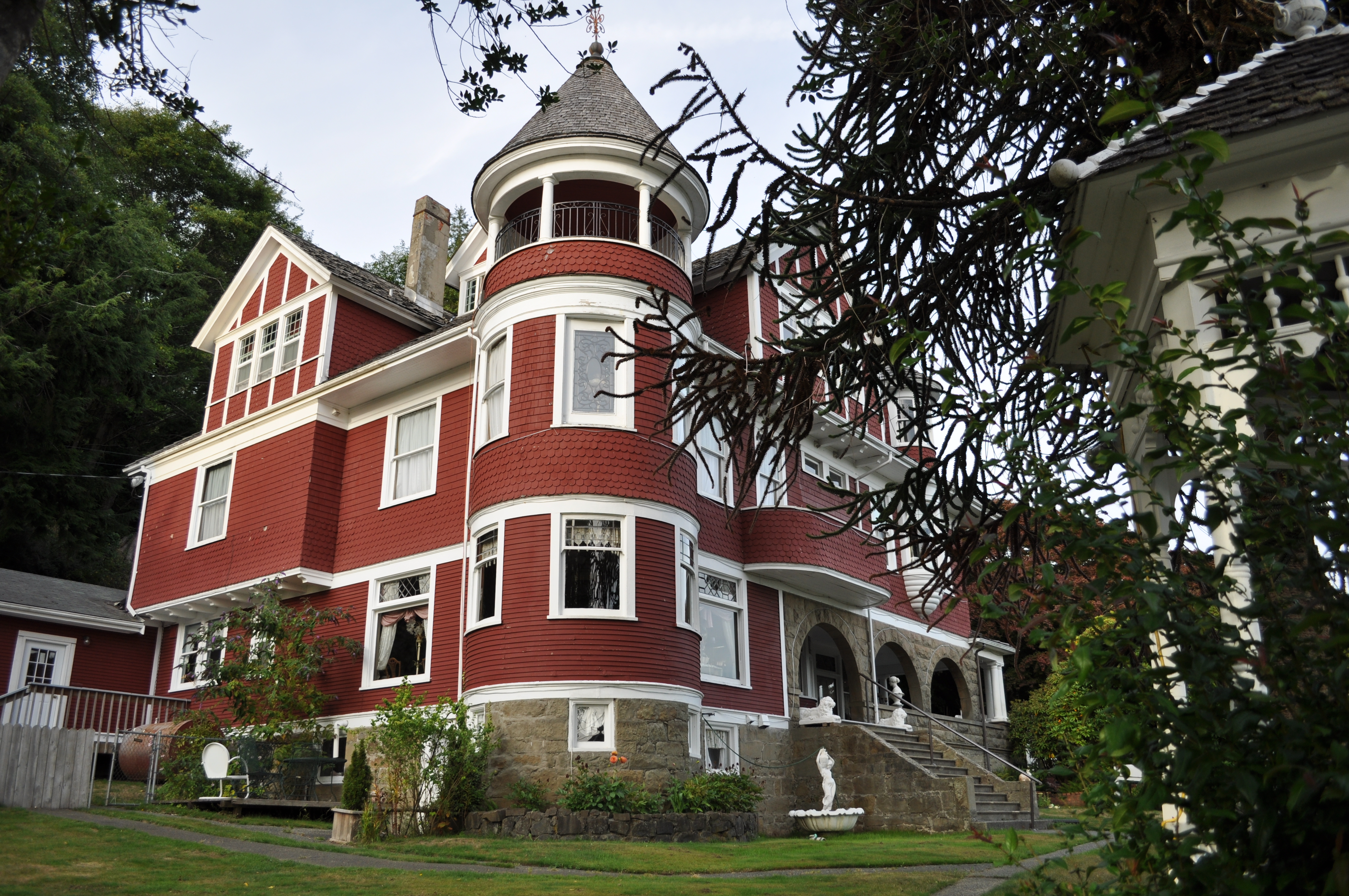
Hoquiam's Castle, listed on the National Register of Historic Places

=== Annual events ===
Hoquiam is the home of the Logger's Playday, an annual strength sport competition that celebrates the skills of timber workers from around the world and the logging heritage of the Pacific Northwest. The first Logger's Playday was held on September 18, 1965, as a part of celebrating the city's 75th anniversary. The event has featured games like speed-climbing, ax-throwing, power sawing, and logrolling, as well as an annual parade organized by the Hoquiam Elks Lodge #1082.

== Sports ==
The main sports team in the town is the Hoquiam High School Grizzlies, the Crimson and Gray. In 2004, the boys basketball team completed a perfect 28–0 season and won the state 2A championship. Victories included non-league wins over Lincoln High of Tacoma, Bellevue High, two over archrival Aberdeen High, and a win over a touring team from Australia. It was the only game the Australians lost during their tour.

In 2006, the Washington Interscholastic Activities Association (WIAA) changed the enrollment limit for the 2A classification allowing Aberdeen to drop to 2A along with other schools in the area creating a new league. The old league football rivalry which celebrated its 100th anniversary in 2006 was renewed with the 101st meeting between Hoquiam and Aberdeen on October 14. Hoquiam Grizzlies won 20–6. Although Aberdeen holds the overall record at 67-33-5 as of the 2010 season.

Hoquiam and Aberdeen High Schools also compete against each other in an annual Fall food drive, referred to as the "Food Ball" and dedicated to helping local low-income families. In this competition everyone wins regardless of which school collects the most food donations.

Since 1981, Hoquiam High School has hosted the largest distance running event on the Washington coast. The Hoquiam Grizzly Alumni Cross Country Invitational features 35+ schools and 1,000+ high school runners every October. Hoquiam also sponsors the Grizzly Alumni Wrestling tournament in January and Volleyball tournament in September.

The city was also home of the Western Baseball League's Grays Harbor Gulls from 1995 to 1997. They played their home games at Olympic Stadium listed on the National Register of Historic Places. The city is now home of the Grays Harbor Bearcats, a developmental football team of the North American Football League (NAFL). Historically, the city has been home to several Minor League Baseball teams including the Hoquiam Loggers and the Grays Harbor Ports.

== Infrastructure ==
=== Flood control ===
As part of the Chehalis Basin Strategy, Hoquiam received a new pump house to replace an ineffective, aging pump. Completed in 2018 at a cost of $1.3 million, the modernized station protects the community's northern residential area, including the Lincoln Elementary School, and is considered a vital infrastructure project for future levee builds, known as the North Shore Levee and the North Shore Levee West Segments. Pipelines that direct the flow of floodwaters were also replaced. The combination of the pump station and levee projects is calculated to eventually remove flood insurance requirements for homeowners and businesses in the neighborhood. During a January 2022 flood, the rebuilt station pumped a combined 51,000,000 US gallons (190,000,000 L; 42,000,000 imp gal) of water without fail over 30 consecutive hours. Due to the improvements, it has been estimated that the city would gain an 11:1 ratio on the return on investment, including a 2:1 ratio for damages avoided during a future flood event.

=== Transportation ===
The local airport, Bowerman Airport (IATA: HQM, ICAO: KHQM, FAA LID: HQM), is coastal Washington's only jet-capable airport. It has a 5,000-foot (1,524 m) runway and a parallel taxiway located on a narrow peninsula extending westward into Grays Harbor. Hoquiam is also home to dozens of species of migratory birds that nest along the water's edge during the milder months.

== Notable people ==
- Anton Anderson – chief engineer of Alaska Railroad; Mayor of Anchorage
- Thomas J. Autzen – pioneer in plywood manufacturing.
- Eldon Bargewell – U.S. Army general; commander of Delta Force.
- William Boeing – Aviator who founded the Boeing company.
- Robert Cantwell – novelist and critic; lived in Hoquiam.
- Harris Ellsworth – U.S. Congressman from Oregon.
- Jack Elway – football player and coach.
- Ed Gayda - basketball player for Washington State University
- George H. Hitchings – co-recipient of 1988 Nobel Prize in Physiology or Medicine.
- Lynn Kessler – eight-term member of Washington State House of Representatives.
- Albert Kuhn – pioneer and businessman.
- Ida Soule Kuhn – pioneer and activist.
- Walt Morey – author.
- Howard P. Robertson – mathematician and physicist.
- Martin F. Smith – U.S. Representative from Washington.
