= List of rivers of Washington (state) =

This is a list of rivers in the U.S. state of Washington.

== By drainage basin ==
This list is arranged by drainage basin. Respective tributaries are indented under each larger stream's name and are ordered downstream to upstream.

=== Strait of Georgia / Salish Sea ===
- Fraser River (British Columbia)
  - Sumas River
    - Chilliwack River
      - Silesia Creek
      - Depot Creek
      - Little Chilliwack River
- Lummi River

==== Bellingham Bay ====
- Nooksack River
  - South Fork Nooksack
    - Hard Scrabble Falls Creek
    - Hutchinson Creek
  - Middle Fork Nooksack
  - North Fork Nooksack
    - Wells Creek
- Samish River
- Whatcom Creek

=== Puget Sound ===
==== Whidbey Basin ====
- Skagit River
  - O'Toole Creek
  - Pressentin Creek
  - Grandy Creek
  - Baker River
    - Swift Creek
    - Shannon Creek
    - Blum Creek
    - Sulphide Creek
  - Jackman Creek
  - Sauk River
    - Suiattle River
    - Clear Creek
    - White Chuck River
    - Sloan Creek
  - Cascade River
    - Bacon Creek
    - Goodell Creek
- Stillaguamish River
  - Boulder River
- Snohomish River
  - Pilchuck River
  - Skykomish River
    - Sultan River
    - Wallace River
      - Olney Creek
    - North Fork Skykomish River
    - South Fork Skykomish River
      - Miller River
      - Beckler River
        - Rapid River
      - Foss River
      - Tye River
  - Snoqualmie River
    - Tolt River
    - Raging River
    - South Fork Snoqualmie River
    - North Fork Snoqualmie River
    - Middle Fork Snoqualmie River
      - Pratt River
      - Taylor River

==== Central Basin ====
- Boeing Creek
- Pipers Creek
- Lake Washington Ship Canal/Lake Washington
  - Taylor Creek
  - Ravenna Creek
  - Thornton Creek
  - McAleer Creek
  - Sammamish River
    - Swamp Creek
    - North Creek
    - Bear Creek
    - Little Bear Creek
    - Lake Sammamish
      - Issaquah Creek
      - Laughing Jacobs Creek
  - Juanita Creek
  - Forbes Creek
  - Yarrow Creek
  - Kelsey Creek
  - Coal Creek
  - Cedar River
    - Rex River
- Duwamish River
  - Longfellow Creek
  - Black River (historical)
    - Cedar River (historical)
  - Green River
    - White River (historical)
    - Soos Creek
    - Newaukum Creek
- Fauntleroy Creek
- Hylebos Creek
- Wapato Creek
- Puyallup River
  - Stuck River
    - White River
      - Clearwater River
      - Greenwater River
  - Carbon River
  - Kapowsin Creek
  - Mowich River
- Puget Creek

==== South Basin ====
- Chambers Creek
  - Clover Creek
- Sequalitchew Creek
- Nisqually River
  - Yelm Creek
  - Ohop Creek
  - Mashel River
    - Little Mashel River
  - Little Nisqually River
  - Kautz Creek
  - Paradise River
  - Van Trump Creek
- Indian Creek
- Deschutes River
- Kennedy Creek
- Sherwood Creek

==== Kitsap Peninsula ====
- Chico Creek
- Springbrook Creek
- Issei Creek

==== Hood Canal, Admiralty Inlet ====
- Union River
- Tahuya River
- Skokomish River
- Dewatto River
- Hamma Hamma River
- Duckabush River
- Dosewallips River
- Big Quilcene River
- Little Quilcene River
- Chimacum Creek

=== Strait of Juan de Fuca ===
- Dungeness River
  - Gray Wolf River
- Elwha River
  - Indian Creek
  - Little River
  - Lillian River
  - Lost River
  - Goldie River
  - Hayes River
- Salt Creek
- Lyre River
- East Twin River
- West Twin River
- Pysht River
- Clallam River
- Hoko River
- Sekiu River
- Sail River

=== Pacific Coast ===
- Waatch River
- Sooes River
- Ozette River
  - Big River
- Quillayute River
  - Dickey River
  - Sol Duc River
  - Bogachiel River
    - Calawah River
      - North Fork Calawah River
      - Sitkum River
- Goodman Creek
- Mosquito Creek
- Hoh River
- Queets River
  - Clearwater River
    - Snahapish River
    - Solleks River
  - Salmon River
  - Sams River
- Raft River
- Quinault River
- Moclips River
- Copalis River

==== Grays Harbor ====
- Humptulips River
- Hoquiam River
- Chehalis River
  - Wishkah River
  - Wynoochee River
  - Satsop River
    - Canyon River
  - Garrard Creek
  - Black River
    - Waddell Creek
  - Lincoln Creek
  - Skookumchuck River
  - Newaukum River
- Newskah Creek
- Johns River
- Elk River

==== Willapa Bay ====
- Cedar River
- North River
- Willapa River
- Bone River
- Niawiakum River
- Palix River
  - Canon River
- North Nemah River
  - Finn Creek
- South Nemah River
  - Middle Nemah River
- Naselle River
- Bear River

=== Columbia River ===
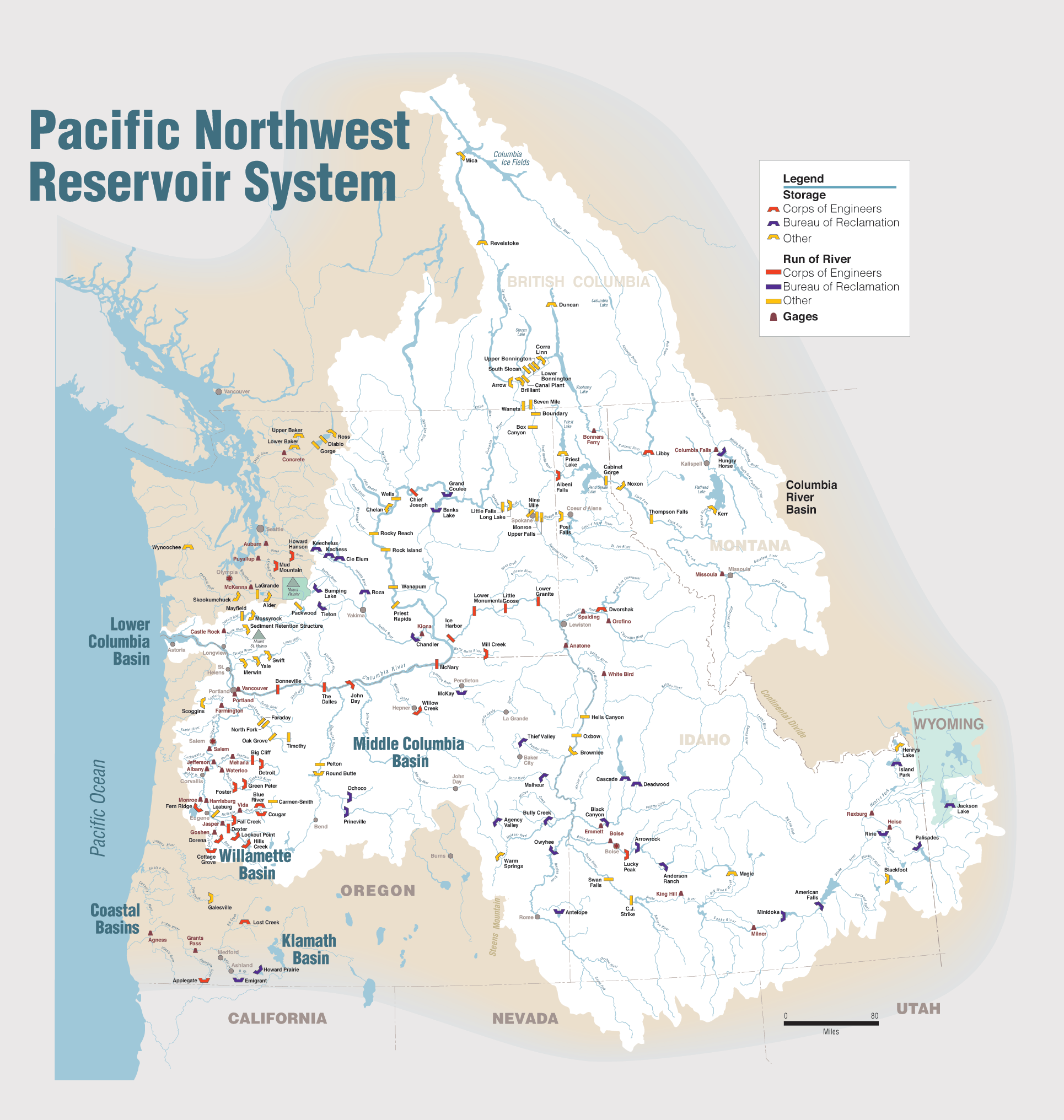
Columbia River Basin, showing major dams and tributaries

==== Lower Columbia Basin ====
- Wallacut River
- Chinook River
- Deep River
- Grays River
- Elochoman River
- Germany Creek
- Coal Creek
- Cowlitz River
  - Coweeman River
  - Arkansas Creek
  - Toutle River
    - South Fork Toutle River
    - North Fork Toutle River
      - Green River
  - Lacamas Creek
  - Salmon Creek
  - Tilton River
  - Cispus River
    - Iron Creek
    - East Canyon Creek
  - Ohanapecosh River
- Kalama River
- Lewis River
  - East Fork Lewis River
  - Canyon Creek
  - Muddy River
- Gee Creek
- Lake River
  - Salmon Creek
    - Woodin Creek / Weaver Creak
  - Burnt Bridge Creek
- Washougal River
  - Lacamas Creek
- Wind River
- Little White Salmon River
- White Salmon River
- Klickitat River

==== Walla Walla and Snake River Basins ====
- Walla Walla River
  - Touchet River
    - Patit Creek
    - South Fork Touchet River
    - North Fork Touchet River
      - Wolf Fork
  - Mill Creek
- Snake River
  - Palouse River
    - Union Flat Creek
    - Rock Creek
  - Tucannon River
  - Alpowa Creek
  - Asotin Creek
  - Grande Ronde River
    - Joseph Creek
    - Crooked Creek
    - Wenaha River

==== Central Columbian Basin ====
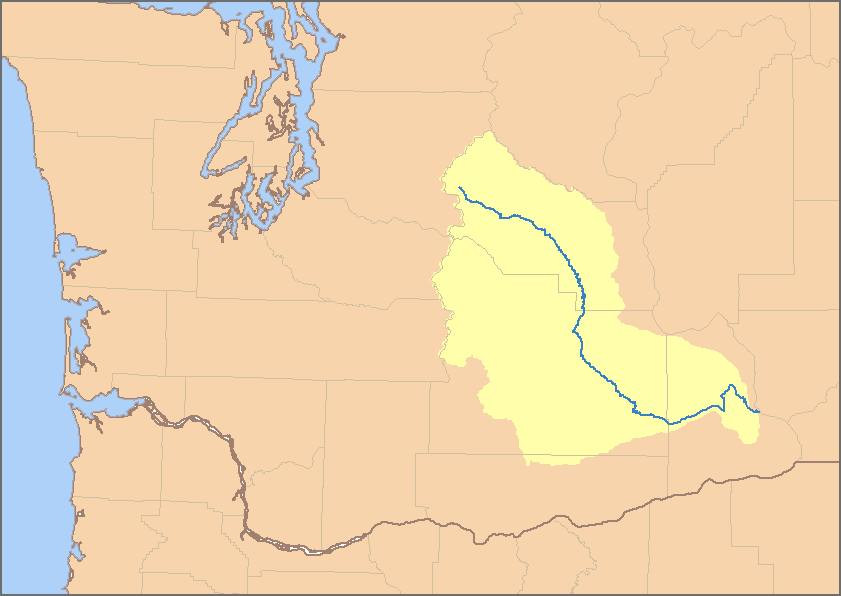
Yakima River Basin

- Yakima River
  - Amon Creek
  - Ahtanum Creek
  - Naches River
    - Tieton River
    - Bumping River
      - American River
  - Teanaway River
  - Cle Elum River
    - Cooper River
    - Waptus River
  - Kachess River
- Lower Crab Creek
  - Potholes Reservoir / Moses Lake
    - Grand Coulee
    - Upper Crab Creek
- Whiskey Dick Creek
- Wenatchee River
  - Icicle Creek (Enchantment Lakes)
  - Chiwawa River
  - Little Wenatchee River
    - White River
    - Napeequa River
- Entiat River
  - Mad River

==== Lake Chelan to Coulee Dam ====
- Chelan River (Lake Chelan)
  - Stehekin River
- Methow River
- Twisp River
- Chewuch River
- Lost River
- Okanogan River
  - Chiliwist Creek
  - Wilder Creek
  - Chewiliken Creek
  - Similkameen River
    - Cecil Creek
  - Ashnola River
  - Pasayten River
- Nespelem River

==== Upper Columbia Basin ====
- Sanpoil River
- Hawk Creek
- Spokane River
  - Cable Creek
  - Little Spokane River
  - Deep Creek
    - Coulee Creek
  - Latah Creek (Hangman Creek)
    - Garden Springs Creek
- Colville River
- Pingston Creek
- Kettle River
- Pend Oreille River (mouth just across Canada–United States border)
  - Priest River (itself in Idaho, but Western tributaries in Washington)

== Alphabetically ==
- American River
- Amon Creek
- Ashnola River
- Baker River
- Bear River
- Beckler River
- Big Quilcene River
- Black River (historical)
- Black River
- Boeing Creek
- Bogachiel River
- Bone River
- Bumping River
- Calawah River
- Canyon River
- Cape Labelle Creek
- Carbon River
- Cedar River (Lake Washington)
- Cedar River (Willapa Bay)
- Chaplain Creek
- Chehalis River
- Chelan River
- Chewuch River
- Chilliwack River
- Chinook River
- Chiwaukum Creek
- Chiwawa River
- Chumstick Creek
- Cispus River
- Clallam River
- Cle Elum River
- Clear Creek
- Clearwater River (Queets River)
- Clearwater River (White River)
- Clover Creek
- Coal Creek
- Columbia River
- Colville River
- Coulee Creek
- Couse Creek
- Coweeman River
- Cowlitz River
- Crab Creek
- Deep Creek
- Depot Creek
- Deschutes River
- Dewatto River
- Dickey River
- Dosewallips River
- Duckabush River
- Dungeness River
- Duwamish River
- East Fork Miller River
- East Twin River
- Edwards Creek
- Elk River
- Elwha River
- Entiat River
- Fauntleroy Creek
- Foss River
- Gray Wolf River
- Grays River
- Green River (Duwamish River tributary)
- Green River (Toutle River tributary)
- Greenwater River
- Hamma Hamma River
- Hard Scrabble Falls Creek
- Hoh River
- Hoko River
- Humptulips River
- Hutchinson Creek
- Icicle Creek
- Indian Creek (Elwha River)
- Issaquah Creek
- Juanita Creek
- Kachess River
- Kalama River
- Kelsey Creek
- Kettle River
- Klickitat River
- Lacamas Creek
- Lewis River
- Little Chilliwack River
- Little Pend Oreille River
- Little Quilcene River
- Little River
- Little Spokane River
- Little Wenatchee River
- Little White Salmon River
- Lyon Creek
- Mad River
- Mashel River
- McAleer Creek
- Methow River
- Middle Fork Snoqualmie River
- Miller River
- Muddy River
- Naches River
- Napeequa River
- Naselle River
- Nason Creek
- Nasty Creek
- Newaukum River
- Niawiakum River
- Nisqually River
- Nooksack River
- North Creek
- North Fork Skykomish River
- North Fork Snoqualmie River
- North River
- Okanogan River
- Palouse River
- Paradise River
- Pend Oreille River
- Pilchuck River
- Pingston Creek
- Pratt River
- Puyallup River
- Queets River
- Quillayute River
- Quinault River
- Raging River
- Rapid River
- Rex River
- Rock Creek (Latah Creek)
- Rock Creek (Palouse River)
- Sail River
- Samish River
- Sammamish River
- Satsop River
- Sauk River
- Silesia Creek
- Skagit River
- Skokomish River
- Skookumchuck River
- Skykomish River
- Sloan Creek
- Snahapish River
- Snake River
- Snohomish River
- Snoqualmie River
- Sol Duc River
- South Fork Skykomish River
- South Fork Snoqualmie River
- South Fork Sultan River
- Spokane River
- Stehekin River
- Stillaguamish River
- Stuck River
- Sultan River
- Swamp Creek
- Tahuya River
- Taylor Creek
- Teanaway River
- Thornton Creek
- Tieton River
- Tilton River
- Tolt River
- Touchet River
- Toutle River
- Tucannon River
- Twisp River
- Tye River
- Union River
- Van Trump Creek
- Walla Walla River
- Wallace River
- Washougal River
- Waatch River
- Wells Creek
- Wenatchee River
- West Fork Miller River
- West Twin River
- White River (Puyallup River tributary)
- White River (Wenatchee Lake tributary)
- White Salmon River
- Wilder Creek
- Willapa River
- Wishkah River
- Wynoochee River
- Yakima River

== See also ==
- List of rivers in the United States
- List of rivers of the Americas by coastline
