= Arkansas (disambiguation) =

Arkansas is a southern U.S. state.

Arkansas may also refer to the Quapaw people, a Native American tribe whom the state was named after.

Other meanings include:

== Places in the United States ==
- Arkansas, West Virginia
- Arkansas, a misspelling of Arkansaw, Wisconsin, an unincorporated community
- Arkansas City, Kansas
- Arkansas City, Arkansas
- Arkansas County, Arkansas
- Arkansas Creek, a stream in Washington
- Arkansas River, a tributary of the Mississippi River
- Mount Arkansas, a mountain in Colorado

== Music ==
- Arkansas (Glen Campbell album) 1975
- Arkansas (Bruce Hampton album), 1987
- Arkansas (The Residents album), 2009
- Arkansas (John Oates album), 2018
- "Arkansas" (song), the state anthem of Arkansas, by Eva Ware Barnett
- "Arkansas (You Run Deep in Me)", an alternative state song
- "Arkansas", a song from the 1975 Glen Campbell album Arkansas
- "Arkansas", a song by John Linnell from the album State Songs, 1999

== Ships ==
- CSS Arkansas, launched 1862, served in the American Civil War
- USS Arkansas, various US Navy ships

== Other uses ==
- Arkansas (grape), another name for the grape Catawba
- University of Arkansas
  - Arkansas Razorbacks, this school's athletic program
- Arkansas (film), a movie starring Vince Vaughn and Liam Hemsworth

== See also ==
- Arkansaw (disambiguation)
- Arkanasa, an album by Bruce Hampton
