= Edwards Creek =

Edwards Creek may refer to:

- Edwards Creek (Churchill County, Nevada)
- Edwards Creek (Washington)
