= Chinook, Washington =

- CDP
- Location of Chinook, Washington
- Coordinates: 46°16′32″N 123°56′32″W
- Country: United States
- State: Washington
- County: Pacific

Area
  - Total: 1.0 sq mi (2.6 km^{2})
  - Land: 1.0 sq mi (2.6 km^{2})
  - Water: 0 sq mi (0.0 km^{2})
- Elevation: 13 ft (4.0 m)

Population (2020)
  - Total: 457
  - Density: 460/sq mi (180/km^{2})
- Time zone: UTC-8 (Pacific (PST))
  - Summer (DST): UTC-7 (PDT)
- ZIP Code: 98614
- Area code(s): 360, 564
- FIPS code: 53-12315
- GNIS feature ID: 2407609

Chinook is a census-designated place (CDP) in Pacific County, Washington, United States. The population was 457 at the 2020 census.

== History ==
Chinook was the site of the first court in Pacific County in 1853, as well as the county's first salmon cannery in 1870.

Chinook was once a wealthy town based on the salmon harvest. There was no road connection to Ilwaco until 1891, when the bridge was completed across the Chinook River. Later, the Ilwaco Railway and Navigation Company built a narrow gauge railroad from Megler to Ilwaco, passing down the main street of Chinook. The railroad was dismantled in 1931.

== Geography ==
According to the United States Census Bureau, the CDP has a total area of 1.0 square miles (2.6 km^{2}), all of it land. The town is located on Baker Bay, on the north side of the Columbia River just behind Cape Disappointment and the mouth of the Columbia.

== Demographics ==
Historical population
Census	Pop.	Note	%±
2000	457		—
2010	466		2.0%
2020	457		−1.9%
U.S. Decennial Census; 1990 2000 2010; 2020

Chinook first appeared as a census designated place in the 2000 U.S. census.

=== Racial and ethnic composition ===
Chinook CDP, Washington – Racial and ethnic composition Note: the US Census treats Hispanic/Latino as an ethnic category. This table excludes Latinos from the racial categories and assigns them to a separate category. Hispanics/Latinos may be of any race.
Race / Ethnicity (NH = Non-Hispanic)	Pop 2000	Pop 2010	Pop 2020	% 2000	% 2010	% 2020
White alone (NH)	436	417	403	95.40%	89.48%	88.18%
Black or African American alone (NH)	0	0	2	0.00%	0.00%	0.44%
Native American or Alaska Native alone (NH)	4	11	12	0.88%	2.36%	2.63%
Asian alone (NH)	3	2	2	0.66%	0.43%	0.44%
Native Hawaiian or Pacific Islander alone (NH)	0	0	0	0.00%	0.00%	0.00%
Other race alone (NH)	0	0	0	0.00%	0.00%	0.00%
Mixed race or Multiracial (NH)	5	15	13	1.09%	3.22%	2.84%
Hispanic or Latino (any race)	9	21	25	1.97%	4.51%	5.47%
Total	457	466	457	100.00%	100.00%	100.00%

=== 2020 census ===
As of the census of 2020, there were 457 people, 282 housing units, and 131 families in the CDP. There were 408 White people, 2 African Americans, 13 Native Americans, 2 Asians, 19 people from some other race, and 13 people from two or more races. There were 25 people of Hispanic or Latino origin.

The ancestry of Chinook was 21.2% English, 10.8% Norwegian, 8.9% German, and 8.9% Irish.

The median age was 58.5 years old. 29.7% of the population were between the ages of 75 and 84 years. 10.8% of the population were veterans.

The median income was $64,050, with $63,950 for non-families. 0.0% of the population were in poverty.

=== 2000 census ===
As of the census of 2000, there were 457 people, 210 households, and 137 families residing in the CDP. The population density was 446.8 people per square mile (173.0/km^{2}). There were 263 housing units at an average density of 257.1/sq mi (99.6/km^{2}). The racial makeup of the CDP was 96.50% White, 0.88% Native American, 0.66% Asian, 0.22% from other races, and 1.75% from two or more races. Hispanic or Latino of any race were 1.97% of the population. 21.2% were of German, 14.9% Irish, 9.1% European, 7.7% French, 7.4% American, 6.9% English, 6.9% Swedish and 6.1% French Canadian ancestry according to Census 2000.

There were 210 households, out of which 20.5% had children under the age of 18 living with them, 56.7% were married couples living together, 6.7% had a female householder with no husband present, and 34.3% were non-families. 31.0% of all households were made up of individuals, and 11.9% had someone living alone who was 65 years of age or older. The average household size was 2.18 and the average family size was 2.71.

In the CDP, the population was spread out, with 19.3% under the age of 18, 4.4% from 18 to 24, 20.6% from 25 to 44, 32.6% from 45 to 64, and 23.2% who were 65 years of age or older. The median age was 48 years. For every 100 females, there were 95.3 males. For every 100 females age 18 and over, there were 93.2 males.

The median income for a household in the CDP was $30,417, and the median income for a family was $40,000. Males had a median income of $40,568 versus $20,625 for females. The per capita income for the CDP was $17,198. About 13.2% of families and 18.2% of the population were below the poverty line, including 40.8% of those under age 18 and none of those age 65 or over.
