= Coal Creek (Washington) =

Coordinates: 47.537717°N 122.129002°W

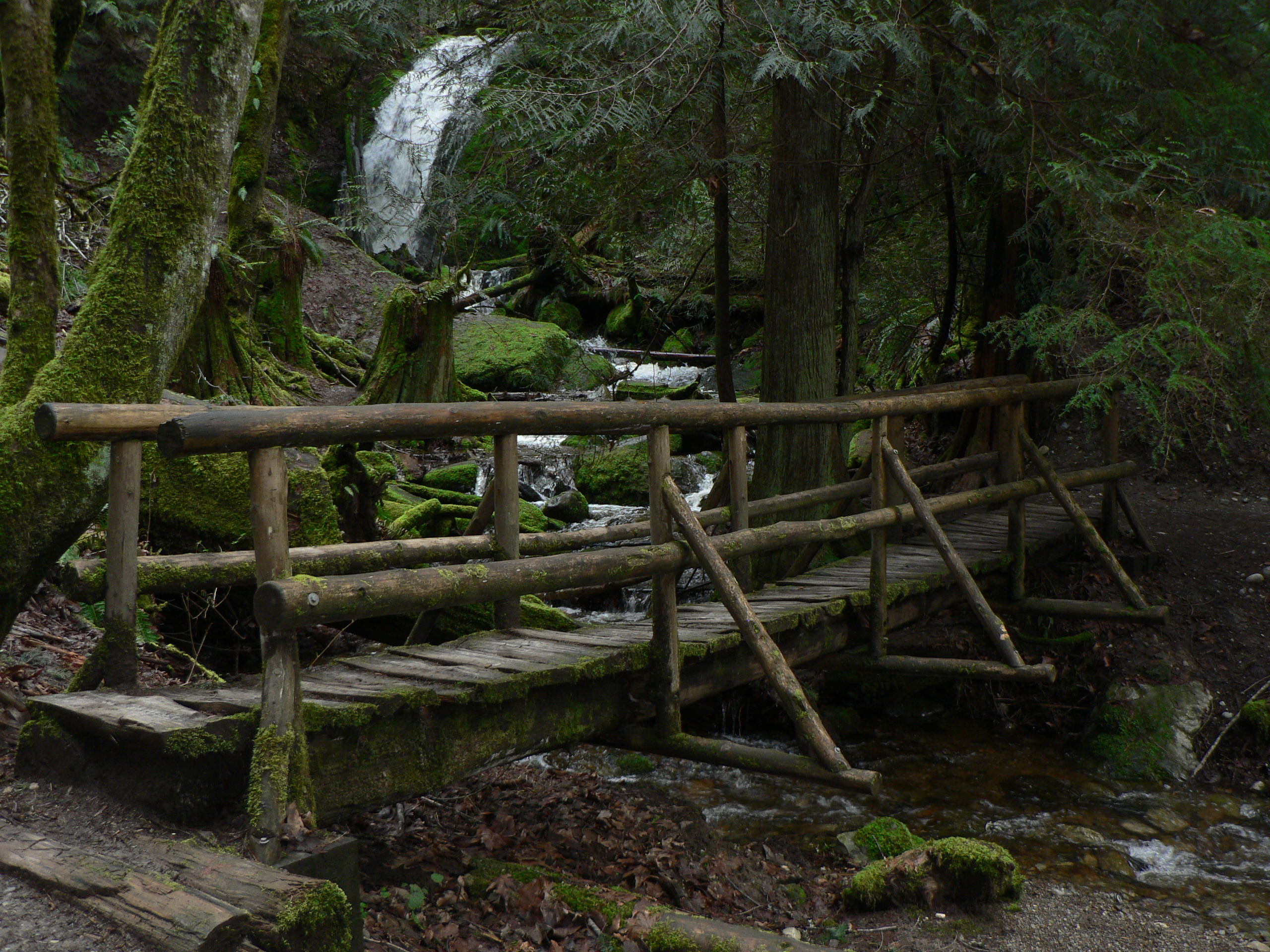
- Footbridge with Coal Creek Falls behind

Location
- Country: United States
- State: Washington
- County: King

Physical characteristics
- Source: Cougar Mountain
- Mouth: Lake Washington
  - location: Newport Shores, Bellevue
- Length: 7 mi (11 km)
- Basin size: 7.11 mi^{2} (18.4 km^{2})

Coal Creek is a creek in Bellevue, Washington, United States, on Seattle's Eastside. It is named for the coal mining industry prominent in the area in the 19th century. There is a popular trail which parallels the creek, allowing views of defunct coal mining equipment and even some bits of coal sitting on the ground in spots.

The source of Coal Creek is 1,400 feet (425 m) above sea level on Cougar Mountain. It flows approximately 7 miles (11 km) to the northwest, emptying into Lake Washington at Newport Shores.

== Coal mine ==
The surveyors Philip H. Lewis and Edwin Richardson first discovered coal along the creek in 1863. This coal was better located for transport to Seattle than the mines further east at Squak Mountain, and in the 1870s the mining of this coal led to the founding of Newcastle, Washington.

In 1983, the Office of Surface Mining Reclamation and Enforcement reclaimed entries to the mine, and by 1984 fenced off 16 "extremely hazardous" openings, contracting work to permanently seal them by 1986.

In 1987, King County and the City of Bellevue produced a hydrological model and subsequent watershed management plan for the creek. The earlier mining activity included mine tailings dumped along the stream bank, creating steep slopes which would collapse and create landslides, contributed to "extensive sedimentation problems" in Coal Creek. Additionally, it was found that 10% of base flows were from mine tunnels.

As of sampling in 2007, concentrations of arsenic, nickel, and Bis(2-ethylhexyl) phthalate were still higher concentrations than the sediment cleanup objectives set forth in the watershed management plan.

== Aquatic life ==
As part of the Bellevue city watershed management plan, Coal Creek salmon escapement is monitored annually. Populations of adult coho salmon stock were re-introduced into the creek in 2014, 2019, and 2021 from the Issaquah hatchery, as well as "9,000 - 13,800 zero age coho into Coal Creek from 1994 - 1997".

Other species of fish observed include sockeye salmon, chinook salmon, steelhead, and trout.

== See also ==
- List of rivers of Washington (state)
