= Wallace River =

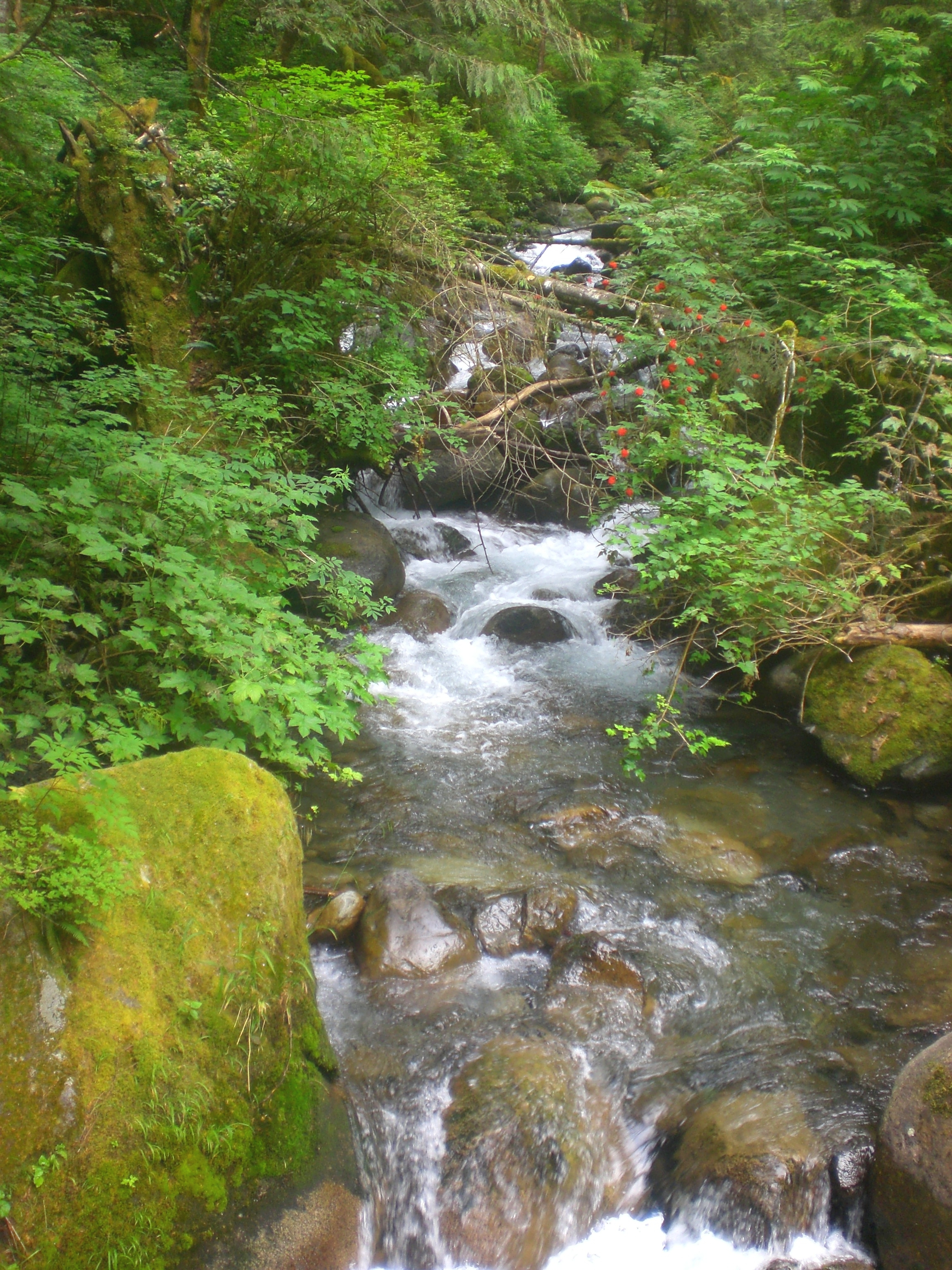
- Wallace River

- Location of the mouth of the Wallace River in Washington Wallace River (the United States)

Location
- Country: United States
- State: Washington
- County: Snohomish County

Physical characteristics
- Source: North Cascades
- Mouth: Skykomish River
  - location: Sultan
  - coordinates: 47°51′33″N 121°47′51″W
- Length: 15 mi (24 km)
- Basin size: 30 sq mi (78 km^{2})

The Wallace River is a medium-sized river in Washington, United States. It is a tributary of the Skykomish River and joins near Sultan, just upstream from the mouth of the Sultan River. The Wallace River is 15 miles (24 km) long. Its drainage basin is 30 square miles (78 km^{2}) in area.

== Course ==
The Wallace River begins at the divide between it and Salmon Creek. It flows west from here until it enters Wallace Falls State Park, where it flows southwest and drops over three large waterfalls, receives the North Fork Wallace River just below the final falls, before going in a westward direction again. It receives three large tributaries in short order before passing under the Stevens Pass Highway, Olney Creek, May Creek and Bear Creek. After flowing under the highway, it continues west until it reaches its confluence with the Skykomish. The North Fork Wallace River begins in Shaw Lake and flows south, passing through two more lakes, Jay Lake and Wallace Lake, before merging with the main fork just below the bottom of the three large waterfalls on the main fork. A trail leads to all three lakes.

== See also ==
- List of Washington rivers
