= Dewatto River =

River in Washington, United States

- Location of the mouth of the Dewatto River in Washington

Location
- Country: United States
- State: Washington
- Counties: Kitsap, Mason

Physical characteristics
- Source: Kitsap Peninsula
  - coordinates: 47°32′25″N 122°57′33″W
- Mouth: Hood Canal
  - coordinates: 47°27′14″N 123°2′55″W
- Length: 8 mi (13 km)

The Dewatto River is a river in the U.S. state of Washington. It originates in western Kitsap Peninsula and flows south, emptying into Hood Canal. The name "Dewatto" comes from the Twana placename [duʔwátaxʷ], which implies the presence of spirits causing mental derangement near the stream's mouth.

== Course ==
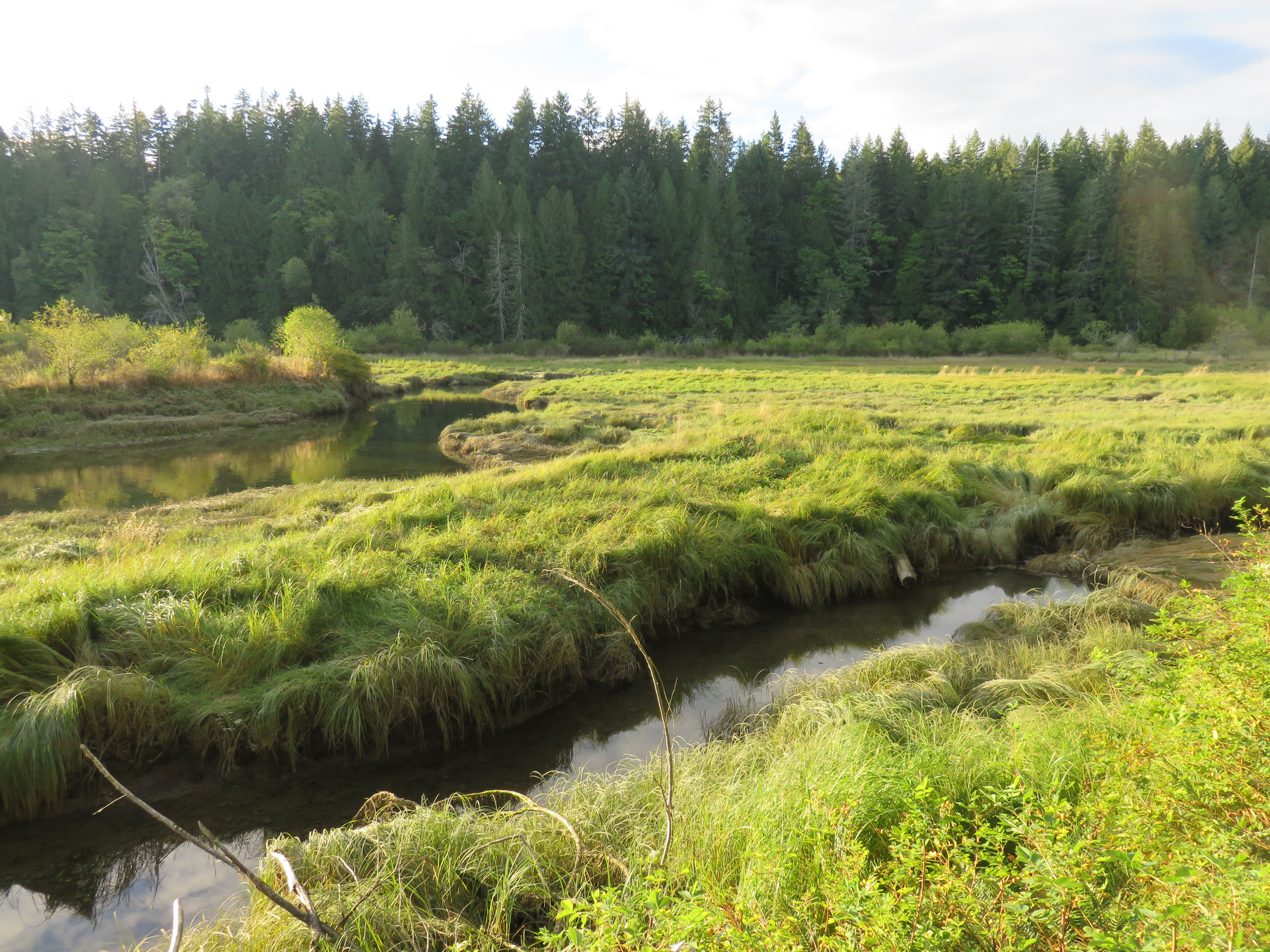
The Dewatto River estuary at the head of Dewatto Bay, where the river empties into the Hood Canal. Photograph taken from Dewatto Bay Road / Dewatto-Holly Road, sunset, 17 August 2017.

The Dewatto River originates in western Kitsap Peninsula near the town of Holly. It flows south and slightly west, approximately parallel to Hood Canal, then turns west to enter Hood Canal at Dewatto Bay.

== See also ==
- List of rivers of Washington (state)
