= Haller Creek =

Stream in Stevens County, Washington, U.S.

Coordinates: 48°28′16″N 117°53′38″W

Haller Creek is a stream in Stevens County, Washington, in the United States. Haller Creek was named for Thomas Haller, an early settler.

== See also ==
- List of rivers of Washington (state)
