= Baker Bay =

Bay in Oregon and Washington, United States

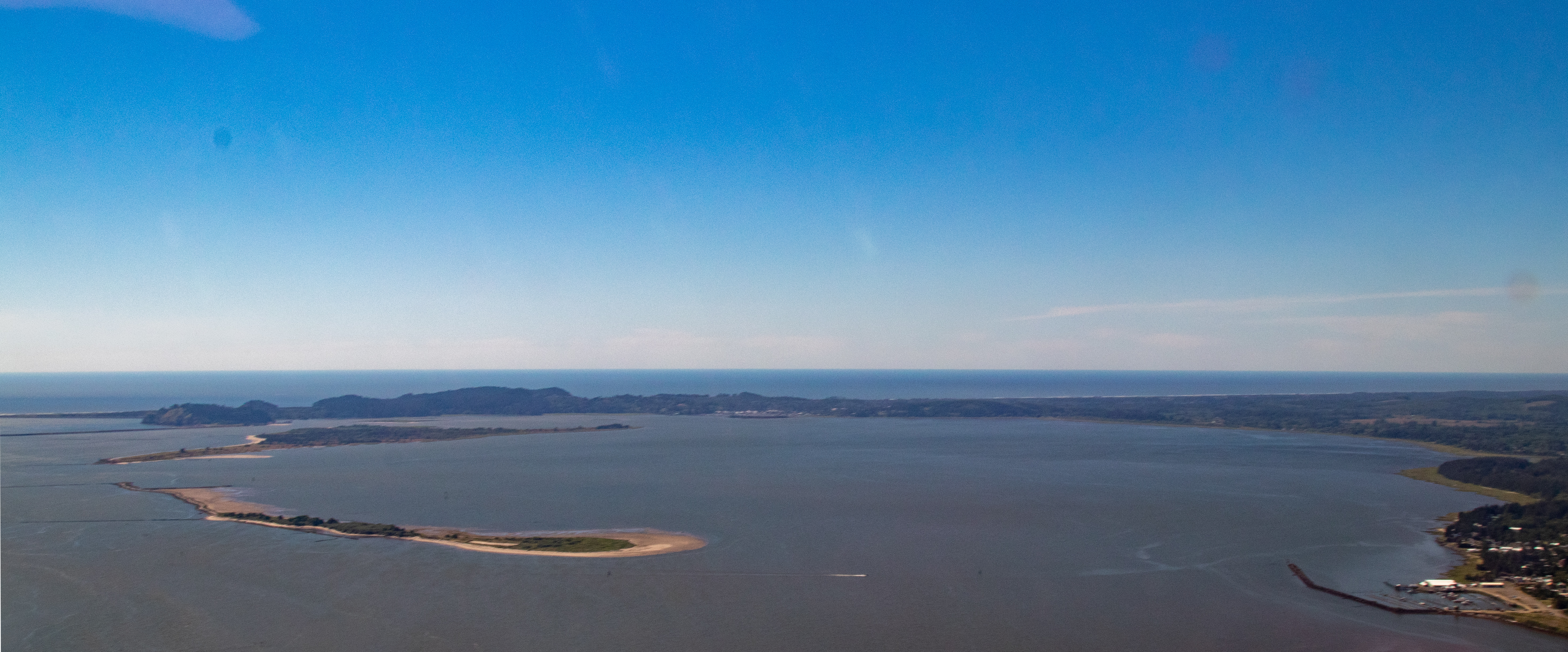

- Location within Washington (state)
- Location: Columbia River
- Coordinates: 46°17′55″N 124°0′3″W
- River sources: Wallacut River, Chinook River
- Basin countries: United States

Baker Bay is a bay located just inside the mouth of the Columbia River, behind Cape Disappointment on the north side of the river, in Pacific County, Washington and Clatsop County, Oregon.

Located on Baker Bay is the city of Ilwaco and the census-designated place (CDP) Chinook. The Wallacut River and Chinook River empty into the bay.

The bay was named in 1792 by William Robert Broughton, captain of HMS Chatham and part of the Vancouver Expedition. He named the bay for James Baker, captain of Jenny, which was anchored in Baker Bay when Broughton explored the river in 1792. Jenny and Chatham left together, crossing the Columbia Bar together.

Sand Island (Clatsop County, Oregon) is located within the bay.
