= Chewiliken Creek =

Stream in Washington, U.S.

Coordinates: 48°37′51″N 119°27′48″W

Chewiliken Creek is a stream in Okanogan County of Washington. It is a tributary of the Okanogan River.

Chewiliken Creek was named after Chewiliken, a local Indian tribal leader.

== See also ==
- List of rivers of Washington
