= Chiliwist Creek =

Stream in Washington, U.S.

Coordinates: 48°15′48″N 119°43′48″W

Chiliwist Creek is a stream in the U.S. state of Washington.

Chiliwist Creek was named after Charley Chiliwist, a pioneer settler of Native American descent.

== See also ==
- List of rivers of Washington
