= Wallace Falls State Park =

State park

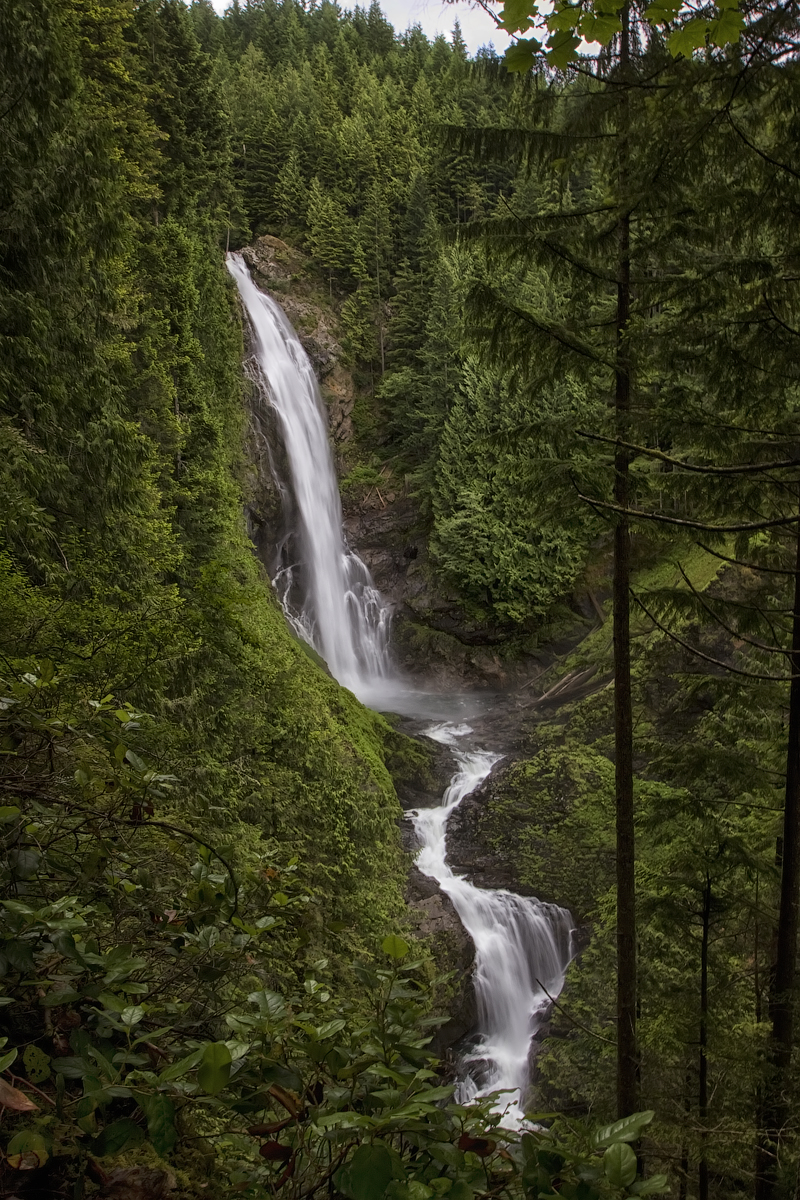
- The middle falls viewed from the trail

- Location within Washington (state) Location within the United States
- Location: Snohomish County, Washington, United States
- Coordinates: 47°52′23″N 121°38′56″W
- Area: 1,380 acres (560 ha)
- Elevation: 1,237 ft (377 m)
- Established: 1971
- Administrator: Washington State Parks and Recreation Commission
- Visitors: 190,111 (in 2024)
- Website: Wallace Falls State Park

Wallace Falls State Park is a public recreation area that encompasses 1,380 acres (560 ha) along the Wallace River in Snohomish County, Washington. The state park is located on the west side of the Cascade Mountains with an entrance point one mile (1.6 km) northeast of the community of Gold Bar. The park features three waterfalls, three backcountry lakes, old-growth coniferous forests, rushing mountain rivers and streams, and the evidence of its logging history in the ruins of railroad trestles, disused railroad grades, and springboard notches in stumps.

== History ==
The name "Wallace" is a corruption of the last name of Joe and Sarah Kwayaylsh, members of the Skykomish tribe, who were the first homesteaders in the area. The park originated with the state's purchase of land from the Weyerhaeuser Timber Company in 1971.

== Waterfalls ==
The park has three waterfalls: Upper Wallace Falls, which cannot be viewed in its entirety and drops 240 feet (73 m) in five separate tiers; 367-foot (112 m) Wallace Falls, the highlight of the park, which falls in three sections—the largest of which drops 265 feet (81 m) and can be seen from the Skykomish Valley; and Lower Wallace Falls, which drops 212 feet (65 m) in five tiers.

== Activities and amenities ==
The park has twelve miles (19 km) of hiking trails and five miles (8.0 km) of biking trails as well as a campground and cabins.
