= Hawk Creek (Columbia River tributary) =

Stream in Washington, U.S.

Coordinates: 47°49′26″N 118°22′23″W

Hawk Creek is a stream in the U.S. state of Washington. It is a tributary of Columbia River.

Hawk Creek derives its name from on Mr. Hawkins, a local pioneer.

== See also ==
- List of rivers of Washington (state)
