= Jackman Creek =

Stream in Washington, U.S.

Coordinates: 48°31′22″N 121°43′05″W

Jackman Creek is a stream in the U.S. state of Washington. It is a tributary of the Skagit River.

Jackman Creek was named after Jack Jackman, a pioneer settler.

== See also ==
- List of rivers of Washington (state)
