= Jenny (1783 ship) =

Merchant vessel, 1783–1797

History

Great Britain
- Name: Jenny
- Owner: 1783:John Clements; 1788:S.Teast & Son
- Builder: Harbour Grace, Newfoundland
- Launched: 1783
- Fate: Wrecked 1797

General characteristics
- Tons burthen: 1783:50 (bm); 1791:78 (bm)
- Sail plan: 1783: Two-masted Schooner; 1791: Three-masted schooner; 1794:Full-rigged ship

Jenny was built at Newfoundland in 1783. She sailed to Britain and traded between Britain and Newfoundland and then between Bristol and Africa until 1790 when Sydenham Teast (or Sidenham Teast) purchased her. Between 1791 and 1794 she made two voyages exploring the Pacific Northwest and gathering sea otter pelts. In 1796 she returned to trading with Africa but was lost in January 1797 as she was returning to Bristol from Africa.

== Career ==
Jenny entered Lloyd's Register (LR) in 1784 with J. Parsons, master, Clements, owner, and trade Bristol–Newfoundland.

Year	Master	Owner	Trade	Source
1784	J. Parsons	Clements	Newfoundland–Bristol	LR
1786	J.Parsons; Wm.Fowlers	J. Clements	Bristol–Newfoundland	LR
1787	Arch. Hill; W.Fowler	Clements	Bristol–Newfoundland	LR
1790	D.Prosser; C.M'Carthy	S. Teast & Son	Bristol–Africa	LR

=== Trading with Africa ===
Records exist for three voyages to Africa for Jenny, none of which involved slave trading. She carried no cannons on any of these voyages, and her crew numbered from eight to ten.

Voyage #1 (1788–1789): Captain William Byrne sailed from Bristol on 22 March 1788. He died on 5 October and it was Captain David Prosser who returned Jenny to Bristol on 5 June 1789.

Voyage #2 (1789–1790): Captain Prosser sailed from Bristol on 3 July 1789. Jenny returned direct from Africa on 15 March 1790.

Voyage #3 (1790): Captain Prosser sailed from Bristol on 26 March 1790. (He died at some point on the voyage before Jenny returned to Bristol.) In June Jenny took on ivory and wax from African Queen at Cape Lahou. Jenny sailed for Bristol on 7 July and returned to Bristol on 9 September.

=== Trading with the Pacific Northwest ===
Clements went bankrupt in 1790 and was forced to sell Jenny, which Sydenham Teast then purchased. Some sources state that Teast employed Jenny as a slaver, carrying slaves between West Africa and Barbados. The most complete database of trans-Atlantic slave voyages does not support that assertion. There was a Jenny that carried slaves to Barbados, but that occurred some two decades before the launch of the Jenny of this article.

Teast had Jenny lengthened and rebuilt in 1791, including the addition of a third mast. Her master changed from M'Carthy to James Baker.

Voyage #1 (1791–1793): Captain James Baker sailed Jenny for the Pacific in the first week of October 1791, bound for Cape Verde and the South Seas.

During her voyage Jenny was at Tahiti. There she picked the captain, two men, and two boys, survivors from the wrecking of Matilda. Two young Tahitian women also came on Jenny. Jenny took them with her to Nootka Sound. In addition to Tahiti Baker also visited Easter Island, Kiritimati (Christmas Island), and the Hawaiian Islands, before sailing to the Pacific Northwest Coast.

In June or July of 1792, Baker entered a harbor at 43°50' and "stayed trading either the natives ten or twelve days" naming the harbor "Port Sidenham" after his employer. The "Jenny" is therefore the first known Euro-American vessel to enter the Umpqua River and trade with the Quuiich (Lower Umpqua people). A copy of Baker's chart of "Puerto Sidman" was retained in Spanish archives through Juan Francisco de la Bodega y Quadra.

In early August 1792, Jenny was in Clayoquot Sound where, with the Butterworth Squadron, Baker was involved in a violent conflict with Tla-o-qui-aht people of chief Wickaninnish. After that Baker took Jenny north to trade for sea otter furs in Haida Gwaii, collecting a cargo of about 350 otter skins. Then Baker sailed to Nootka Sound, arriving in early October, 1792.

Baker did not have a license that would permit him to go to Guangzhou (Canton) to sell his cargo of furs. He therefore decided to sail back to England. He did not want to return to Tahiti and so was pleased that George Vancouver, who was going back, would take the two Tahitian women.

In mid October Baker left Nootka Sound to return to Bristol, stopping at the Columbia River. In December 1792 William Robert Broughton, captain of HMS Chatham, part of the Vancouver Expedition, encountered Baker in the Columbia River. The Jenny and Chatham left the river and crossed the Columbia Bar together, then parted ways. Broughton named the bay where he found Jenny Baker Bay, after James Baker.

Jenny returned to Bristol on 25 June 1793.

Teast prepared Jenny for her next voyage to the Pacific. He had her converted from a three-masted schooner to a square-rigged ship. He acquired trade goods that would appeal to the indigenous inhabitants of the Pacific Northwest. He arranged with the British East India Company (EIC) for a license that would permit her to bring back a cargo from China after selling her furs there. Third, he appointed a new captain, John William Adamson.

Voyage #2 (1793–1795): Captain Adamson sailed from Bristol in October, 1793. She was at California in April 1794. Between May and September she gathered otter skins, mostly in Haida Gwaii. Adamson then sailed to Nootka Sound, arriving on 29 Sept 1794. There he encountered Vancouver, who noted that he had gathered some 2,000 sea otter skins. Jenny then sailed to Canton, arriving on 25 December 1794. Captain Adamson and Jenny returned to Bristol on 22 July 1795, or 25 July.

=== Africa again ===
Jenny did not appear in Lloyd's Register for 1795, but she reappeared in 1796 with E. Buckle, master, Teast, owner, and trade Bristol–Africa.

Captain Edmund Buckle sailed Jenny for Africa on 29 February 1796 on a voyage not intended for the slave trade. She was reported to have passed Sierra Leone on 7 April.

== Loss ==
Lloyd's List reported on 27 January 1797 that Jenny, Buckle, master, had been lost on Lundy Island as she was returning to Bristol from Africa. The only survivor was the first mate. Teast and the underwriters attempted to salvage what they could.

The place where Jenny was lost is now known as Jenny's Cove (51°10.87′N 4°40.48′W).
