= Mad River (Washington) =

- Location of the mouth of the Mad River in Washington Mad River (Washington) (the United States)

Location
- Country: United States
- State: Washington
- County: Chelan

Physical characteristics
- Source: Cascade Range
  - coordinates: 47°56′30″N 120°38′52″W
- Mouth: Entiat River
  - coordinates: 47°44′9″N 120°21′48″W
- Basin size: 92.4 sq mi (239 km^{2})
- Discharge
  - location: river mile 0.4 at Ardenvoir
  - average: 76.7 cu ft/s (2.17 m^{3}/s)
  - minimum: 9.0 cu ft/s (0.25 m^{3}/s)
  - maximum: 659 cu ft/s (18.7 m^{3}/s)

The Mad River is a river in the U.S. state of Washington. It rises in the Cascade Mountains and flows southeast to join the Entiat River. It is part of the Columbia River basin, being a tributary of the Entiat River, which empties into the Columbia River.

== See also ==
- List of rivers of Washington (state)
- List of tributaries of the Columbia River
