= Lake Washington =

Freshwater lake in the United States

- x̌ačuʔ (Lushootseed)
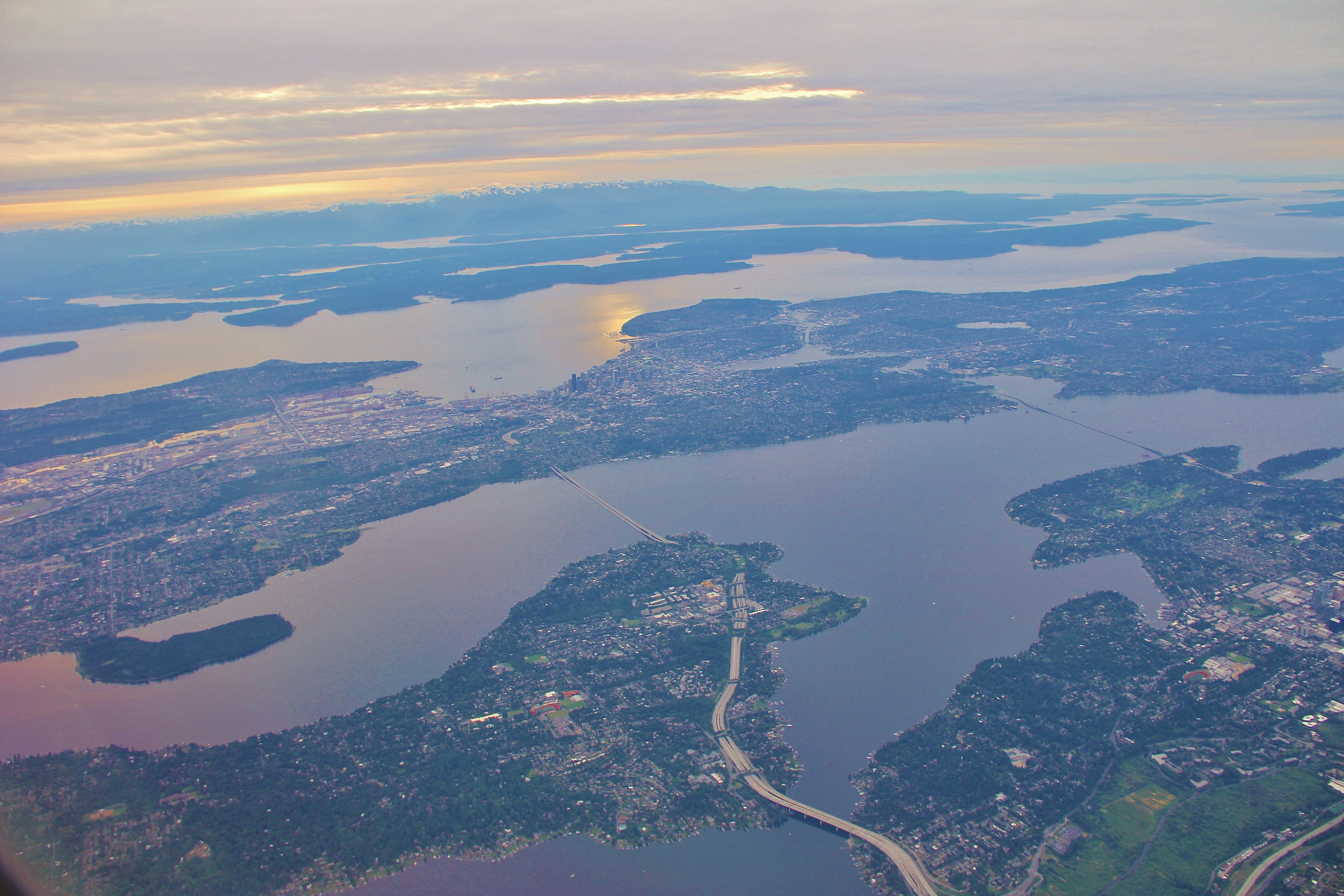
- The two longest floating bridges in the world cross Lake Washington
- Location: King County, Washington, United States
- Coordinates: 47.63°N 122.26°W
- Primary inflows: Sammamish, Cedar Rivers; Ravenna, Thornton, Kelsey, Juanita, Forbes and Coal Creeks
- Primary outflows: Lake Washington Ship Canal (1916)
- Catchment area: 315,000 acres (1,270 km^{2})
- Basin countries: United States
- Max. length: 22 mi (35 km)
- Surface area: 33.8 sq mi (88 km^{2}), 33.8 sq mi (21,600 acres)
- Average depth: 108 ft (33 m)
- Max. depth: 214 ft (65 m)
- Water volume: 2,350,000 acre⋅ft (2.90 km^{3})
- Surface elevation: 16 ft (4.9 m) above mean sea level, 20.6 ft (6.3 m) above Puget Sound mean lower low tide
- Islands: Mercer Island, Foster Island, Bird Island, Marsh Island: Until 1916: Ohler's Island, Pritchard Island; After 1916: Broken Island
- References: King County

Lake Washington (Lushootseed: x̌ačuʔ) (Note: Pronounced HA-choh; lit. "lake") is a large freshwater lake adjacent to the city of Seattle, Washington, United States. It is the largest lake in King County and the second largest natural lake in the state of Washington, after Lake Chelan. It borders the cities of Seattle on the west, Bellevue and Kirkland on the east, Renton on the south, and Kenmore on the north, and encloses Mercer Island. The lake is fed by the Sammamish River at its north end and the Cedar River at its south.

The lake provides boating and sport fishing opportunities. Some fish species found in its waters include sockeye salmon, coho salmon, Chinook salmon, rainbow trout, largemouth bass, smallmouth bass, yellow perch, and black crappie.

Lake Washington has two passenger seaplane bases: Kenmore Air Harbor on its north end; and Will Rogers – Wiley Post Memorial Seaplane Base on its south end, adjacent to Renton Municipal Airport.

== Name ==
Lake Washington has been known to the Duwamish and other Indigenous peoples living on the lake for millennia as x̌ačuʔ (lit. "lake" in Lushootseed). At the time of European settlement, it was recorded as At-sar-kal in a map sketched by engineer Abiel W. Tinkham; and the Chinook Jargon name, Hyas Chuck ("great/large water"), was also used. Other English names historically used for the lake include Lake Geneva by Isaac N. Ebey; and Lake Duwamish in railroad surveys under Governor Isaac Stevens. Lake Washington received its present name in 1854 after Thomas Mercer suggested it be named after George Washington, as the new Washington Territory had been named the year before.

== Geography ==
Lake Washington's basin was formed by glacial processes associated with the Puget lobe of the Cordilleran Ice Sheet during the Vashon Glaciation, likely through a combination of preferential erosion of weak rock and sediments by the glacier itself and by subglacial meltwater during the glacier's retreat. At the end of the Pleistocene, the basin that is now Lake Washington connected directly to the channels of Puget Sound through the north end of the Duwamish Valley. The basin may or may not have been a waterway at this point, as eustatic sea levels were approximately 150 meters (490 feet) lower than at present and the land around Seattle was about 75–85 meters (246–279 ft) lower due to isostatic depression from the weight of the glacier. However, the rapid sea level rise from the end of the Pleistocene through the early Holocene had flooded the Duwamish Valley and Lake Washington within a couple thousand years. Lake Washington did not become a freshwater lake, isolated from Puget Sound, until some time after 5,700 years Before Present, when sedimentation in the Duwamish Valley closed off its southern end. The new lake, lacking any other outlets, drained south through the Black River into the Duwamish Valley and, ultimately, Puget Sound until the construction of the Lake Washington Ship Canal in 1916. There are three sunken forests in the lake that were created by landslides during an earthquake around 900 C.E.

== Creeks and rivers ==
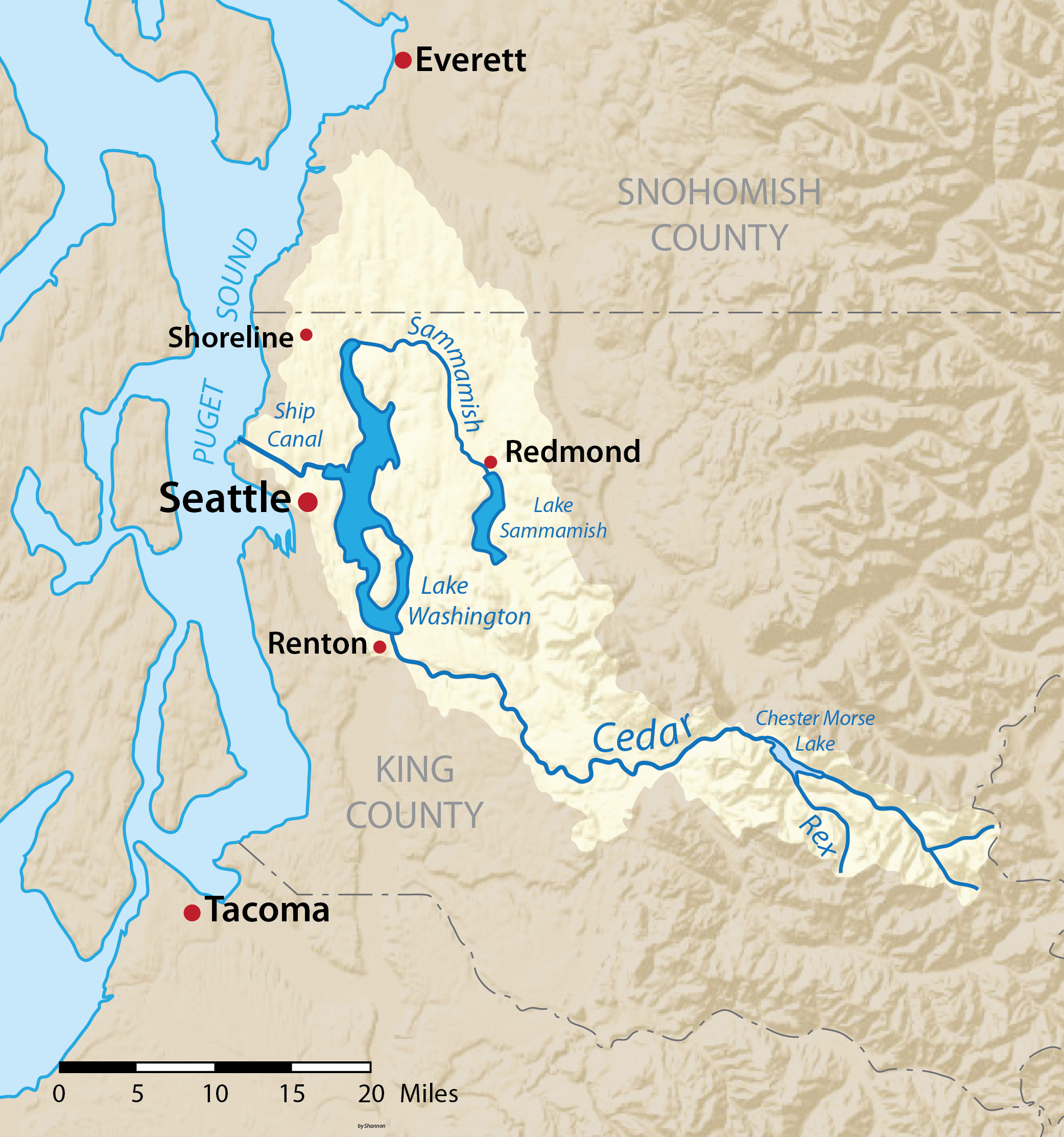
Lake Washington watershed

The main inflowing rivers are the Sammamish and Cedar Rivers, with the Cedar supplying most of the water. Seasonal changes in the flow of the Sammamish are moderated by a weir at the Lake Sammamish inlet.

The lake is drained by the Lake Washington Ship Canal.

In addition, there are numerous small creeks and rivers which feed the lake, including:

- Coal Creek
- Denny Creek (O.O. Denny Park)
- Fairweather Creek
- Forbes Creek
- Juanita Creek
- Kelsey Creek
- Little Creek
- Lyon Creek
- Mapes Creek
- May Creek
- McAleer Creek
- Mercer Slough
- Ravenna Creek
- Taylor Creek
- Thornton Creek
- Yarrow Creek
- Yesler Creek

Historically, construction of the Lake Washington Ship Canal drastically changed the inflow and outflow of the lake. Before construction of the canal in 1916, Lake Washington's outlet was the Black River, which joined the Duwamish River and emptied into Elliott Bay. When the canal was opened the level of the lake dropped nearly nine feet (2.7 m). The canal became the lake's sole outlet, causing the Black River to dry up and disappear. Before construction, the Sammamish River was the primary source of water for Lake Washington, and the lowering of the lake slightly increased its flow. As part of the ship canal project, the Cedar River was diverted into Lake Washington to become the lake's primary source.

== Infrastructure ==
=== Canal ===
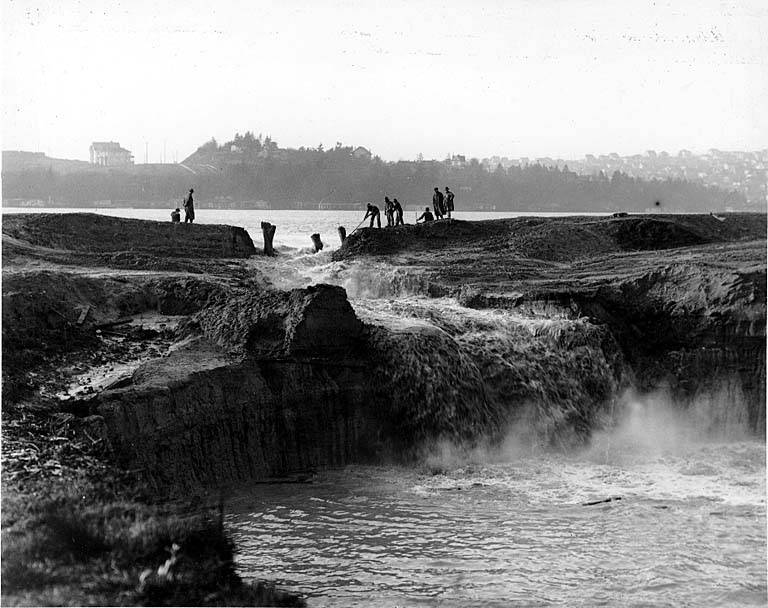
Cutting the cofferdam at Montlake in 1913, draining Lake Washington over the next three months until it was level with Lake Union

The Montlake Cut, part of the Lake Washington Ship Canal, connects the lake to Lake Union and ultimately Puget Sound.

=== Bridges ===
Three concrete floating bridges cross Lake Washington: Evergreen Point Floating Bridge (SR 520), Lacey V. Murrow Memorial Bridge (I-90 eastbound), and Homer M. Hadley Memorial Bridge (I-90 westbound). The floating design is because Lake Washington's depth and muddy bottom prevented the emplacement of the pilings or towers necessary for the construction of a causeway or suspension bridge. The bridges consist of hollow concrete pontoons that float atop the lake, anchored with cables to each other and to weights on the lake bottom. The roadway is constructed atop these concrete pontoons. Additionally, the East Channel Bridge carries Interstate 90 from Mercer Island to Bellevue.

The Evergreen Point Floating Bridge (officially the SR 520 Albert D. Rosellini Evergreen Point Floating Bridge) carries State Route 520 from Seattle's Montlake neighborhood to Medina. The bridge opened in April 2016 and replaced the original Evergreen Point Floating Bridge at the site, which opened in 1963. The 7,710-foot-long (2,350 m) floating span is the longest floating bridge in the world, as well as the world's widest measuring 116 feet (35 m) at its midpoint.

The Lacey V. Murrow Memorial Bridge carries Interstate 90 eastbound from Seattle's Mount Baker neighborhood to Mercer Island. Originally opened in 1940, a portion of the Lacey V. Murrow Bridge sank during a windstorm on November 25, 1990. At the time, the bridge was closed for renovations. A Washington State Department of Transportation (WSDOT) investigation revealed that the incident resulted from the improper handling of hydrodemolition water being used during the renovation, rather than in any basic flaw in the bridge's concept or design. The bridge was subsequently rebuilt and reopened in 1993. The Murrow Bridge is the second-longest floating bridge in the world, at 6,620 ft (2,020 m).

The Third Lake Washington Bridge (officially the Homer M. Hadley Memorial Bridge) carries the westbound lanes of Interstate 90 and two tracks of Sound Transit's 2 Line between Mercer Island and Seattle. The first pontoon for the new bridge was floated in September 1983, and opened in June 1989. The floating bridge is the fifth-longest of its kind in the world, at 5,811 feet (1,772 m).

=== Steamboats and ferries ===
Steamboats and ferries operated on the lake from about 1875 to 1951. In 1892, John L. Anderson started to ferry between Leschi Park and Newcastle on the steamer Winnifred. Winnifred burned in 1894, but Anderson soon launched a fleet of several ships operated by the Anderson Steamboat Company. In 1913, the Port Commission of Seattle launched the steel-hulled steam ferry Leschi, undercutting Anderson's operations and he eventually went out of business in 1917. The public ferries continued operations until 1950, approximately one year after the tolls were removed from the Murrow bridge.

== Shoreline cities and towns ==
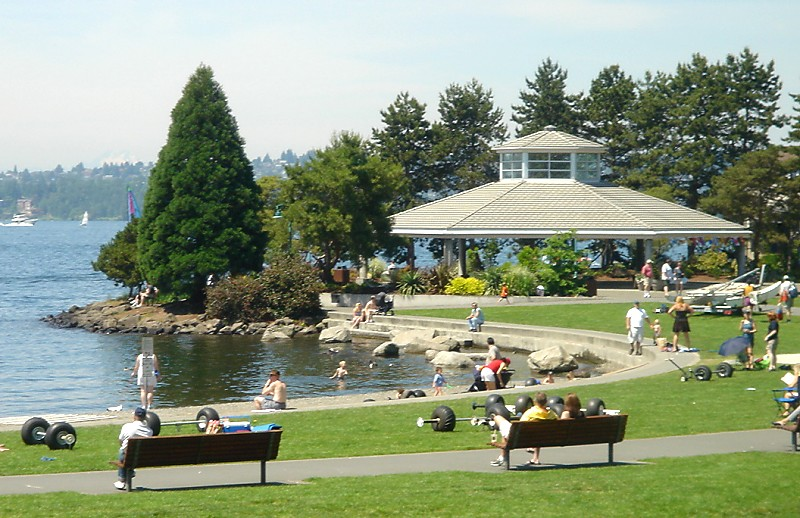
Marina Park in Kirkland, Washington

The cities and towns bordering the lake, going clockwise from the west, are Seattle, Lake Forest Park, Kenmore, Kirkland, Yarrow Point, Hunts Point, Medina, Bellevue, Beaux Arts Village, and Renton. The city of Mercer Island occupies the island of the same name, in the southern half of the lake.

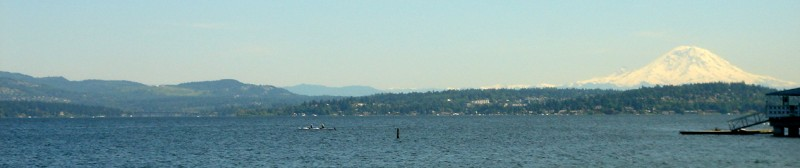
Lake Washington looking southeast toward Mercer Island with Mount Rainier in background

== Water purity ==
Around 1900, Seattle began discharging sewage into Lake Washington. During the 1940s and 1950s, eleven sewage treatment plants were sending state-of-the-art treated water into the lake at a rate of 20 million gallons per day. At the same time, phosphate-based detergents came into wide use. The lake responded to the massive input of nutrients by developing unpleasant blooms of noxious blue-green algae (cyanobacteria). The water lost its clarity, the desirable fish populations declined, and masses of dead algae accumulated on the shores of the lake. After significant pollution, the October 5, 1963, issue of the Post Intelligencer referred to the lake as "Lake Stinko". Citizen concern led to the creation of a system that diverted the treatment-plant effluents into nearby Puget Sound, where tidal flushing would mix them with open-ocean water.

The diversion was completed in 1968, and the lake responded quickly. The algal blooms diminished, the water regained its clarity, and by 1975, recovery was complete. Careful studies by a group of limnologists from the University of Washington showed that phosphate was the culprit. Since then, Lake Washington has undergone major improvements, drastically improving the ecology and water quality, making the water twice as clear as it was in 1950.

== See also ==
- Mount Baker Crew rowing club
- Seafair Cup hydroplane races
- Lake Sammamish
