= Asbestos Falls =

Waterfall in Washington (state), United States

Coordinates: 48°11′12″N 121°34′29″W

- Interactive map of Asbestos Falls
- Location: Near Darrington, Snohomish County, Washington
- Type: Segmented
- Total height: 55 feet (17 m)
- Number of drops: 1
- Total width: 20 feet (6.1 m)
- Watercourse: Clear Creek

Asbestos Falls is a waterfall on Clear Creek in Snohomish County, Washington, United States. It is located just above the mouth of Helena Creek.

The falls are about 55 feet high and drop that in two segments, only one of which is easily seen from the rim of the canyon the falls drop into. To reach the far segment, one would have to descend into the canyon, which is dangerous enough before fording the creek, which would also be dangerous, especially during high water.

Reaching the falls requires a moderately difficult bushwhack to the edge of the canyon from just past Asbestos Creek Falls, which is countless times confused with Asbestos Falls.

The falls are also simply known as Clear Creek Falls, but the official name is Asbestos Falls.
