= Couse Creek (Snake River tributary) =

Stream in Washington, U.S.

Coordinates: 46°12′18″N 116°57′59″W

Couse Creek is a stream in the U.S. state of Washington.

Couse Creek was named for kowish (Anglicized as "couse"), an important food source for local Indians.

== See also ==
- List of rivers of Washington
