= Taylor Creek (Seattle) =

Stream in Seattle, Washington, U.S.

Coordinates: 47°24′29.7″N 122°0′51.9″W

Location
- Country: United States
- State: Washington

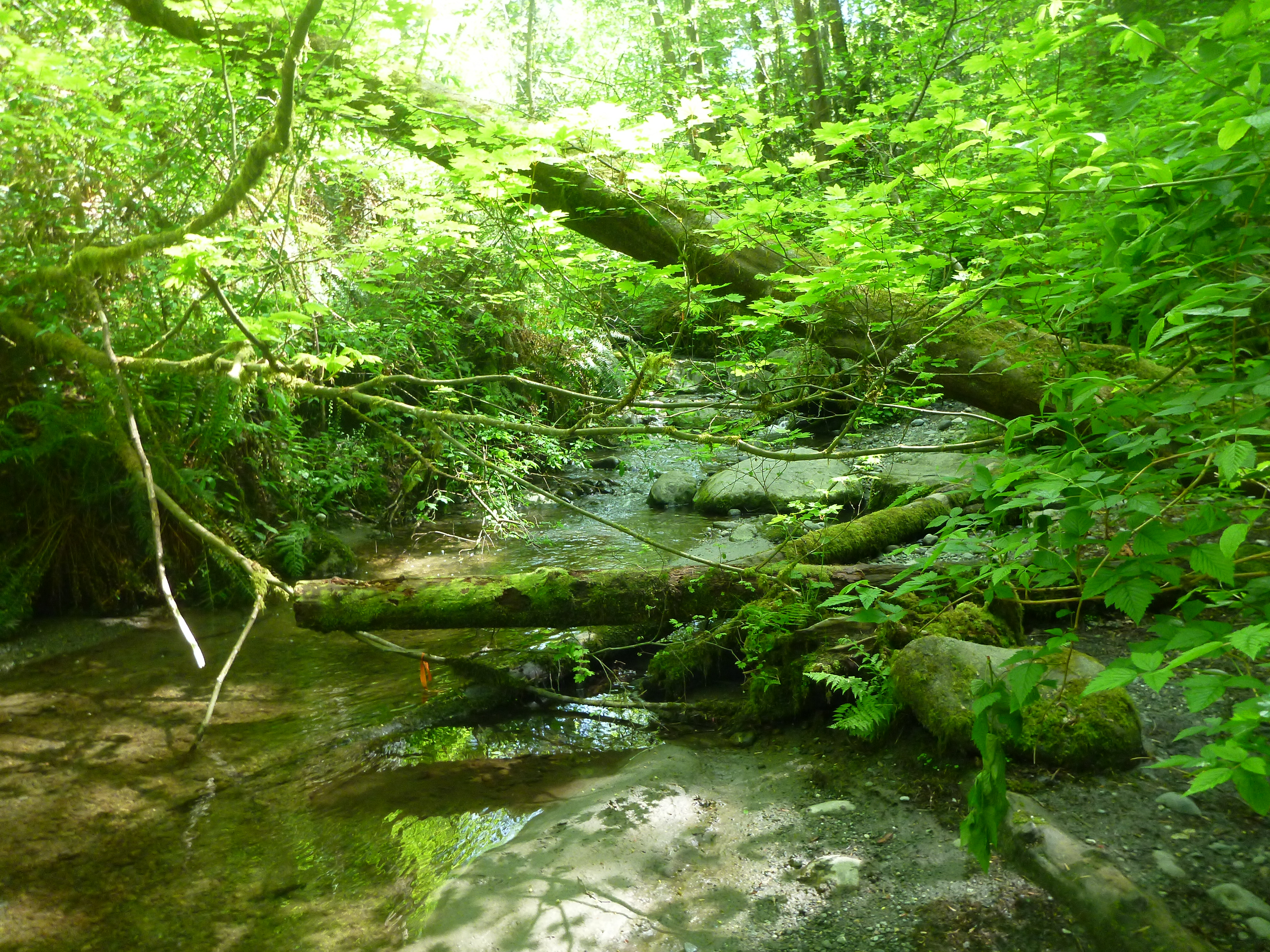
Taylor Creek flows through Lakeridge Park

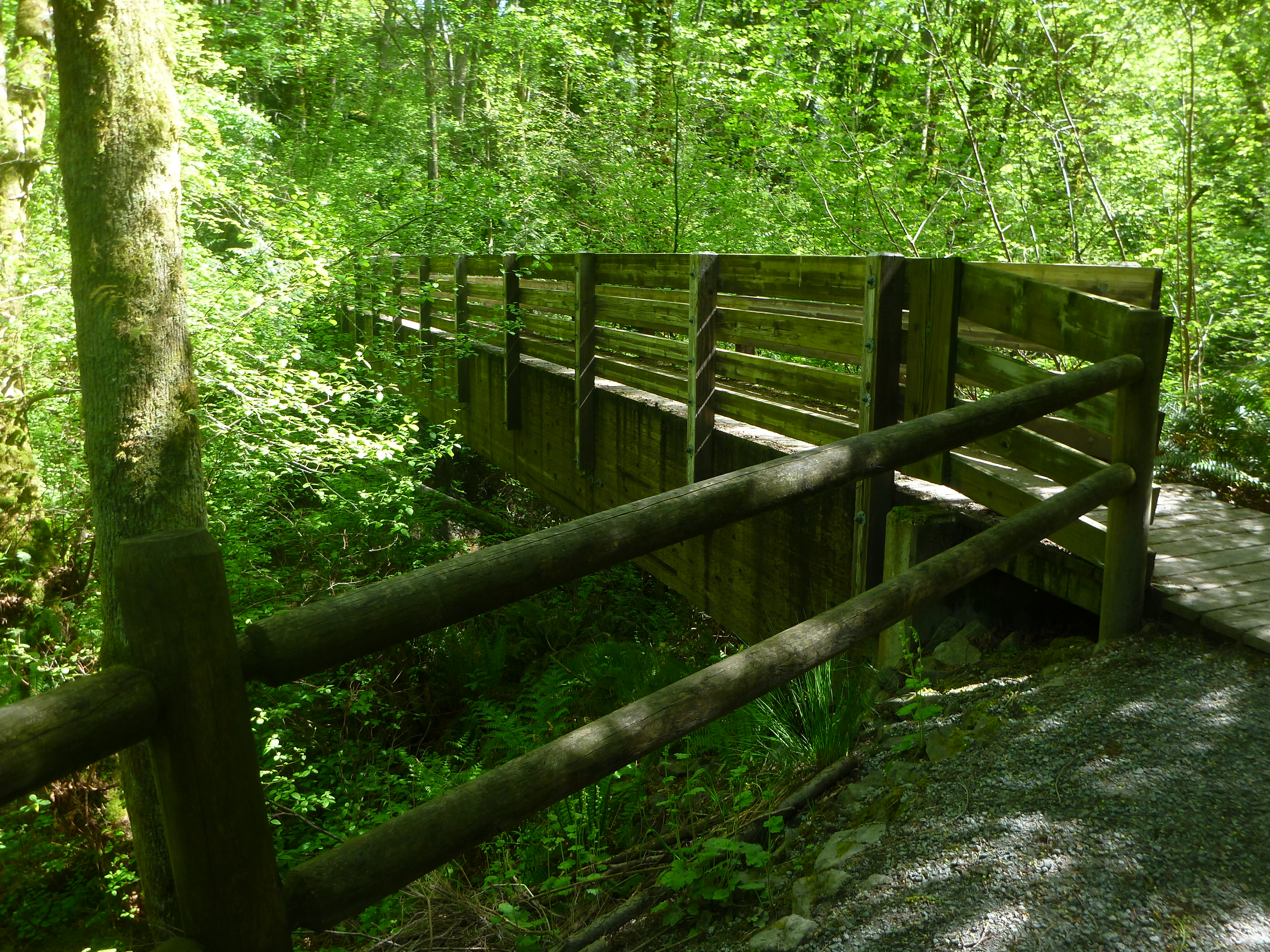
Bridge crossing Taylor Creek

Taylor Creek is a stream in Seattle, Washington, flowing from Lakeridge Park in Deadhorse Canyon, west of Rainier Avenue S at 68th Avenue S, to Lake Washington. The creek's name comes from the Taylor sawmill, which in the late 1880s was located where the creek flowed into Lake Washington, to the east of the park. The ravine has been the focus of efforts to plant native vegetation and restore salmon runs in Taylor Creek. With volunteer effort and some city matching grants, restoration has been underway since 1971. Volunteers have planted thousands of indigenous trees and plants, removed tons of garbage, removed invasive plants, and had city help removing fish-blocking culverts and improving trails. Sightings of raccoons, opossum and birds are common. Taylor is the fourth-largest creek in urban Seattle. In 2010, the city of Seattle began a project to improve fish passage along the creek.

== See also ==
- List of rivers of Washington (state)
- Daylighting (streams)
- Water resources
