= Mount Baker Crew =

American rowing club

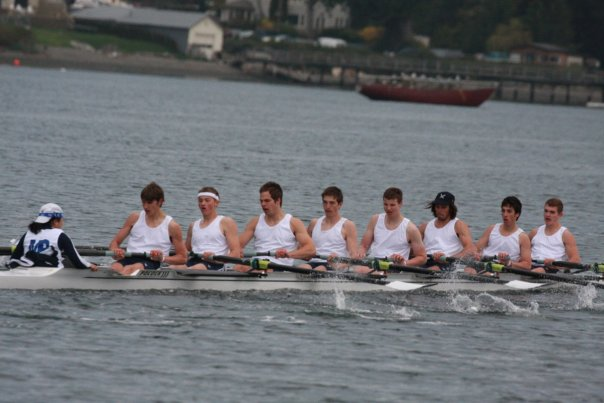
Brentwood, Canada, April 2009. Mt. Baker Varsity 8+

Mt. Baker Crew is a rowing club based out of Seattle, Washington, which offers rowing programs for high school students and for adult rowers. Rowing out of a recently upgraded boathouse on the southwest shore of Lake Washington, Mt. Baker's Junior Men's and Women's Varsity programs are especially competitive, often placing first or second at major races in the northwest region, and usually competing at a national level at the end of the spring season.

== Results ==
=== 1990 ===
At the USRowing Youth National Championships Mt. Baker won the Women's 2-.

=== 1991 ===
At the USRowing Youth National Championships Mt. Baker won the Men's 4+ and the Men's 2-.

The Men's 4+ lineup was, from the stern, Greg Allison (cox), Ryan Allison, Evan McDonald, Tyler Davidson, Elie Finegold.

The Men's 2- lineup was, from the stern, Ryan Allison and Elie Finegold. Their time was 7:44.71, more than 11 seconds ahead of the runner-up pair.

The Men's 8+ also competed, and placed 4th in the Grand Final.

The coach of the team was Sara Nevin.

=== 1992 ===
At the USRowing Youth National Championships Mt. Baker won the Women's 4x+.

Men's 8+ attended, standings will be updated.

=== 1993 ===
At the USRowing Youth National Championships Mt. Baker won the Men's 8+ with a time of 6:29:43 and the Men's 2-.

The Varsity 8+ Lineup was: Jessica Riley(cox), Matt Barnes(8), Carl Bolstad(7), Ryan Benedict(6), Ian Adams(5), Lindsey Lawrence(4), John Melber(3), Ian Hood(2), W.T. Arnold(1), and was coached by Sara Nevin

=== 1995 ===
At the USRowing Youth National Championships Mt. Baker won the Women's 8+.

=== 1996 ===
At the USRowing Youth National Championships Mt. Baker won the Women's 8+.

=== 1997 ===
At the USRowing Youth National Championships Mt. Baker won the Women's 8+.

=== 1998 ===
At the USRowing Youth National Championships Mt. Baker won the Women's 8+ and the Women's Lightweight 8+.

=== 1999 ===
At the USRowing Youth National Championships, Mt. Baker won the Women's 1x and the Men's Lightweight 8+.

The Men's Junior Lightweight 8+ Lineup was: Z. Prowda (Cox), C. Peschel (Stroke), D. Vavrichek (7), O. Yacobi (6), R. McCann (5), R. Althauser (4), S. Naylor(3), E. Robinson (2), J. Florence (Bow), and was coached by J. Kirkman and L. Lawrence. B. Waller attended as alternate.

=== 2001 ===
At the USRowing Youth National Championships Mt. Baker won the Women's 4+.

=== 2003 ===
At the USRowing Youth Northwest Regional Championships Mt. Baker placed fifth in the Men's 8+ (stroked by Develming), third in the Women's 8+ (O'Brien), second in the Women's 4x+ (Stimmel), fourth in the Men's Lightweight 8+ (Marrone), third in the Men's 4+ (Devleming), first in the Women's 4+ (O'Brien), and third in the Men's 4+ (Develming).

=== 2004 ===
At the USRowing Youth National Championships Mt. Baker won the Men's 4+.

=== 2006 ===
At the USRowing Youth National Championships in June 2006, Mt. Baker's Varsity Men's 8 placed 3rd out of 18, and the Lightweight Men's 8 placed 8th out of 18.

The Varsity 8+ Lineup was: G. Bullis (cox), C. Rinker (8), J. Olson (7), D. Robbins (6), E. Buckmiller (5), S. Vincent (4), N. Kaspers (3), T. Stanton (2), J. North (1), and was coached by N. Bivins.

The Lightweight 8+ Lineup was: A. Voeller (cox), T. Davidson (8), B. Darrah (7), C. Graham (6), D. Block (5), B. Dickey (4), M. Willner (3), M. Deeg (2), G. Bernal (1), and was coached by S. Koch.

=== 2007 ===
At USRowing Youth National Championships in June 2007, Mt. Baker's Varsity Men's 8+ placed 4th, the Men's Lightweight placed 7th, the Women's Lightweight 8+ placed 8th, and the Women's Varsity 4+ placed 3rd, earning a bronze medal.

The Women's Lightweight 8+ lineup was: Q. Mckinley (cox), C. Penhale (8), I. Grover (7), M. Foutch (6), C. George (5), L. Jelaco (4), K. Jensvold-Rumage (3), M. Hicks (2), T. Breese (1), and was coached by J. Brannen.

The Women' Varsity 4+ lineup was: E. Barney (cox), A. Opalka (4), D. Golden (3), C. Backman (2), C. Thompson (1), and was coached by J. Coffman.

=== 2008 ===
At USRowing Youth Northwest Regional Championships, Mt. Baker won the Women's Varsity Lightweight 8+, Varsity Lightweight 4+, and 2nd Varsity Lightweight 4+.

The Varsity Lightweight 8+ lineup was: C. Penhale (cox), L. Jelaco (8), M. Foutch (7), J. O'Connor (6), K. Jensvold-Rumage (5), K. Caudle (4), M. Hicks (3), M. Rood (2), K. Kaspers (1) and was coached by J. Brannen.

The Varsity Lightweight 4+ lineup was: M. Richardson (cox), L. Jelaco (4), M. Foutch (3), J. O'Connor (2), K. Kaspers (1) and was coached by J. Brannen.

At USRowing Youth National Championships, the Women's Varsity Lightweight 8+ placed 7th and the Women's Varsity Openweight 8+ placed 11th.

The Varsity Openweight 8+ lineup was: L. Peizer (cox), A. Opalka (8), C. Macpherson-Krutzky (7), M. Brown (6), L. Vincent (5), A. Garella (4), S. Eadon (3), H. Gallagher (2), D. Golden (1) and was coached by J. Coffman.

=== 2009 ===
At USRowing Youth Northwest Regional Championships, Mt. Baker won the Women's Varsity Lightweight 4+ for a second straight year.

The Varsity Lightweight 4+ lineup was: M. Richardson (cox), L. Jelaco (4), J. O'Connor (3), M. Rood (2), K. Kaspers (1) and was coached by R. Frantz.

At USRowing Youth National Championships, the Women's Varsity Openweight 4+ placed 6th, the Women's Varsity Lightweight 8+ placed 9th, and the Men's Varsity Openweight 8+ placed 15th.

The Varsity Openweight 4+ lineup was: L. Peizer (cox), D. Golden (4), L. Vincent (3), M. Brown (2), S. Eadon (1) and was coached by J. Coffman.

The Varsity Lightweight 8+ lineup was: M. Richardson (cox), L. Jelaco (8), J. O'Connor (7), K. Jensvold-Rumage (6), S. Knopp (5), C. Ihle (4), K. Thomas(3), K. Kaspers (2), M. Rood (1) and was coached by R. Frantz.

The Men's 8+ lineup was: A. Tanaka (cox), D. Lockett (8), G. Carlson (7), T. Ehlers (6), B. Willis (5), R. Capelluto (4), L. Gehring (3), R. Capelluto (2), C. Johnson (1) and was coached by S. Koch.

=== 2010 ===
At USRowing Northwest Junior Regional Championship, Mt. Baker won the Men's Varsity 8+ event as well as the Varsity Lightweight 8+ and Men's Varsity 4+.

At the USRowing Youth National Championship the Men's Varsity 8+ placed 4th, the Women's Lightweight 8+ placed 8th and the Women's Varsity 8+ placed 15th.

The Men's Varsity 8+ lineup was: P. Schroedl (cox), G. Carlson (8), M. Whelan (7), B. Willis (6), H. Cryst (5), Z. Mankoff (4), N. Holt (3), C. Johnson (2), D. Lockett (1) and was coached by J.P. Marquart.

The Women's Varsity 8+ lineup was: I. Kelly-Whitfield (cox), C. Jessup (8), J. Travis (7), L. Vincent (6), L. Willis (5), H. Rempel (4), J. O'Connor (3), M. Weisfield (2), E. Rosenfeld (1) and was coached by J. Coffman.

The Women's Varsity Lightweight 8+ lineup was: M. Richardson (cox), K. Kaspers (8), C. Erving (7), C. Ihle (6), K. Thomas (5), L. Leung (4), H. Atlas (3), A. Elggren (2), M. Rood (1) and was coached by J. Brannen.

=== 2011 ===
At the USRowing Northwest Junior Regional Championship, Mt. Baker won the Men's and Women's Varsity 4+, placed fifth in the Men's Lightweight 4+, second in the Women's Lightweight 4+, first in the Women's High School 8+, second in the Men's Varsity 8+, sixth in the Women's Varsity 8+, and second in the Women's Lightweight 8+.

At the USRowing Youth National Championship the Men's Varsity 8+ finished third, the Women's Varsity 4+ finished fourteenth, and the Women's Lightweight 8+ finished tenth.

The Men's Varsity 8+ lineup was: P. Schroedl (cox), Z. Mankoff (8), G. Henry (7), M. Whelan (6), H. Cryst (5), B. Geyman (4), N. Holt (3), P. Lee (2), H. Page-Salisbury (1), and was coached by J.P. Marquart.

The Women's 4+ lineup was: I. Kelly-Whitfield (cox), L. Willis (4), L. Vincent (3), R. MacAulay (2), and K. Johnson (1), and was coached by J. Coffman.

The Women's Lightweight 8+ lineup was: M. Rood (cox), A. Elggren (8), H. Atlas (7), C. Ihle (6), E. Ralston (5), A. Leonard (4), K. Dong (3), H. Rossen (2), and E. Gleed (1), and was coached by J. Brannen.

=== 2012 ===
At the USRowing Northwest Junior Regional Championships, Mt. Baker won the Men's 8+ (stroked by M. Whelan), placed fourth in the Women's 8+ (stroked by L. Willis), third in the Women's Lightweight 8+ (stroked by A. Elggren), third (stroked by C. Gardner) and fourth (stroked by G. Henry) in the Men's 2-, fourth in the Men's 4+ (stroked by M. Whelan), sixth in the Women's 4+ (stroked by L. Willis), and third in the Women's Lightweight 4+ (stroked by A. Elggren).

At the USRowing Youth National Championships the Men's Varsity 8+ (stroked by M. Whelan) finished third and the Women's Varsity 8+ (stroked by C. Erving) finished seventeenth.

=== 2013 ===
At the USRowing Northwest Junior District Championships, Mt. Baker won the Men's 8+ (stroked by O. Borges) and the Men's 4+ (stroked by C. Gardner), placed sixth in the Women's 4+ (stroked by E. Gardiner), sixth in the Women's Lightweight 4+ (stroked by A. Elggren), fifth in the Women's 8+ (stroked by E. Gardiner), third in the Men's Lightweight 8+ (stroked by M. Ugaz-Cano), and fourth in the Women's Lightweight 8+ (stroked by A. Elggren).

At the USRowing Youth National Championship the Men's Varsity 8+ placed eighth (stroked by O. Borges) and the Men's Lightweight 8+ finished seventeenth (stroked by M. Ugaz-Cano). The junior girls were coached by J. Coffman and the junior boys by J.P. Marquart.

=== 2014 ===
The Junior Women's 8+ (Cox: Elena Gleed, 8: Anika Christofferson, 7: Margaret Seaton, 6: Gretchen Peterson, 5: Charlotte Lepp, 4: Lucy Porter, 3: EJ Gardiner, 2: Laura Marck, 1: Maddie Lyons) won the Brentwood Regatta, Windemere Cup and Northwest Junior Regionals. They placed 6th at the Youth National Championship. The Junior Men's team petitioned a 4+ to Nationals, finishing 9th overall.

This was Men's head coach JP Marquat's final season as head coach. He was succeeded by his assistant Erik Strand.

=== 2015 ===
The Junior Women's 8+ (stroked by M. Seaton) finished 1st at Northwest Junior Regionals and the Junior Men's Lightweight 4+ (stroked by A. Silva) and Heavyweight 2- (Y. Curry/R. Shrontz) finished 2nd.

At Youth Nationals, the Women's 8+ finished 5th, the Ltwt 4+ 13th, and the 2- 15th.

=== 2016 ===
The Junior Men's 8+ (coxed by A. Gold, 8: J. Oberle, 7: C. Rossen, 6: N. Parks, 5: C. Williams, 4: R. Shrontz, 3: Y. Maile, 2: A. Tarr, Bow: H. Hardiman-Mostow) finished 2nd at Northwest Regionals, while the Men's 4+ (c: Gold, Oberle, Rossen, Williams, Parks) finished 3rd.

The Junior Women's 8+ (c: I. Gahard, S. Boyd-Fliegel, E. Gardiner, F. Washburn, I. Green, A. Smith, C. Lepp, L. Anderson, E. Vagen) finished 2nd as well.

At Youth Nationals, the Men's 8+ finished 8th and the Women's 8+ finished 15th.
