= Newskah Creek =

Physical characteristics
- Mouth
  - coordinates: 46°57′06″N 123°51′02″W

Newskah Creek is a stream located in Grays Harbor County, Washington. The creek flows south for approximately 9.5 miles (15.4 km) from the hills above Grays Harbor and empties into the Grays Harbor estuary 2 miles west of the community of South Aberdeen. The land within the Newskah Creek watershed is primarily used for commercial forestry.

The creek has one named tributary, Falls Creek, which flows into the main stem approximately 3/4 of the distance upstream from the mouth.

The origin of the name Newskah is obscure.

== See also ==
- List of rivers of Washington (state)
