= Cape Labelle Creek =

Stream in Washington, United States

Coordinates: 48°35′11″N 119°04′44″W

Cape Labelle Creek is a stream in the U.S. state of Washington.

Cape Labelle Creek derives its name from Kate Labelle, an early settler.

== See also ==
- List of rivers of Washington
