= Pingston Creek =

Stream in Washington, U.S.

Coordinates: 48°39′07″N 118°05′03″W

Pingston Creek is a stream in the U.S. state of Washington.

Pingston Creek was named after Alfred G. Pingston, a pioneer settler.

== See also ==
- List of rivers of Washington (state)
