= Mosquito Creek (Washington) =

Stream in Washington (state)

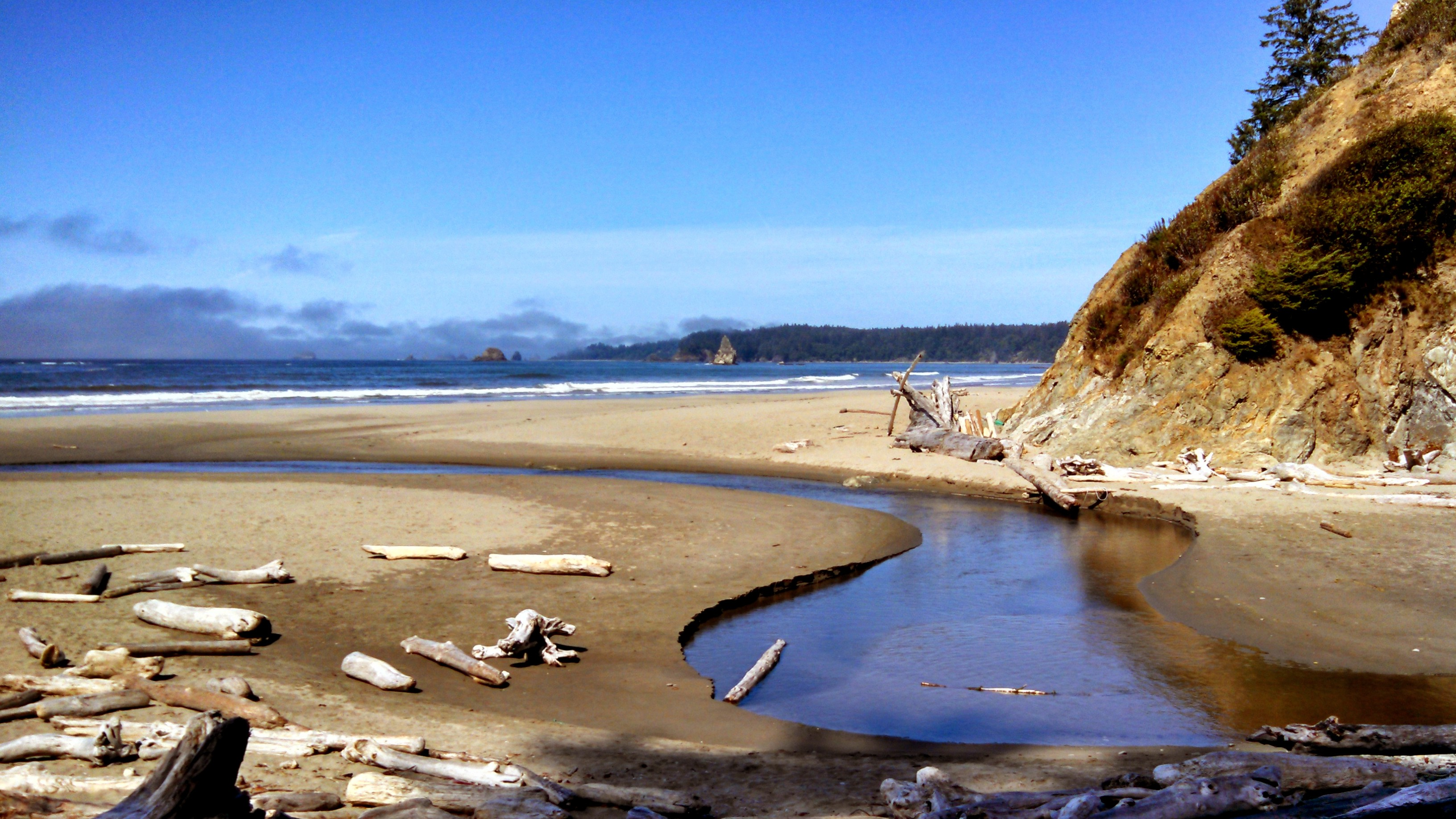
- Mouth of Mosquito Creek, Olympic National Park

Location
- Country: United States
- State: Washington
- County: Jefferson

Physical characteristics
- Source
  - coordinates: 47.76972°N 124.38333°W
- Mouth
  - coordinates: 47.79892°N 124.48178°W
- Length: 10 miles (16 km)
- Basin size: 20 square miles (52 km^{2})

Mosquito Creek is a stream on the west coast of the Olympic Peninsula in northwestern Washington. The lower reaches of the creek run through high bedrock cliffs in Olympic National Park, while further upstream the creek and its tributaries form a suitable environment used by coho salmon and steelhead trout. Evergreen forest covers the basin, with the portions outside of the national park consisting mainly of timberland. Forest roads and culverts running near the river have caused some environmental damage to its channel.

== Course ==
Mosquito Creek runs through a portion of the western coast of the Olympic Peninsula in Jefferson County in northwestern Washington. It drains a roughly 20 square miles (52 km^{2}) area between the watersheds of the Hoh River to the north and Goodman Creek to the south. It has three main branches: a mainstem which flows to the northeast, a south fork, and a southeast fork. The headwaters of the creek are in the coastal hills west of U.S. Route 101. The three forks converge about a mile from the coast of the Pacific Ocean, and the creek proceeds to its mouth at a beach opposite Alexander Island. According to the National Hydrography Dataset, the creek has a total length of 10 miles (16 km).

== Hydrology and geology ==
In its lower course, the creek cuts a valley deep into the hills, traversing a chaotic arrangement of mélange rocks for about a mile before it reaches the coast. These lower reaches of the creek lie in Olympic National Park, and are crossed by the park's South Coast Route trail. Occasional floods or high tides at the creek render the trail impassable. During favorable conditions, the creek can be shallow and easily fordable, but it can become dangerously high during heavy rains, requiring hikers to test the water using a rock or hiking pole.

The middle and upper portions of the creek run through a mix of private and state-owned commercial timberlands, including a portion of Washington Department of Natural Resources land for about a mile before crossing into the national park. About 5% of the basin area is zoned as a rural residential area in the uppermost portion of its reach.

A strand terrace (a wide flat bench cut in the bedrock above the creek) is located 60 metres (200 ft) above the south bank of lower Mosquito Creek, with another terrace at about 12 metres (39 ft) in elevation. The coastline in this area is features a large bedrock cliff running along the backshore, about 100 metres (330 ft) high, possibly formed from glacial outwash carried by Mosquito Creek from the Hoh Glacier. A sandy barrier beach runs across the mouth of a creek, adjacent to a small, deep delta.

During the winter, the stream reaches 36 feet (11 m) in width in its lower reaches, decreasing to 12 feet (3.7 m) by about 7 miles (11 km) upstream. The summer width of the creek ranges from 6–18 feet (1.8–5.5 m) within the same area. The lower reaches of the creek have a gravel and sand substrate, which transitions to rubble and boulders further upstream.

== Biology ==
Coho salmon are known to spawn in the lower 7 miles (11 km) of the creek from late October to mid-February, while a small stock of steelhead trout spawn in the creek from January through April. Mosquito Creek has a number of small tributary streams also used by salmon, with sand and gravel streambeds. The vegetation of the area mainly consists of evergreen forest, with smaller portions of deciduous forest, shrubland, and mixed forest. About 4% of the river basin is wetland, mainly forested palustrine wetlands.

Several culverts block portions of the stream, disrupting the habitat of anadromous (migratory) fishes. About 2.2 miles (3.5 km) of mostly unpaved forest roads run through the vicinity of the river, leading to sedimentation and degraded conditions for the stream's channels.

== History ==
The creek was named Chah-latt Creek in early reports of the region. By the 1970s, the upper basin of the creek had become subject to logging.
