= Juanita Creek =

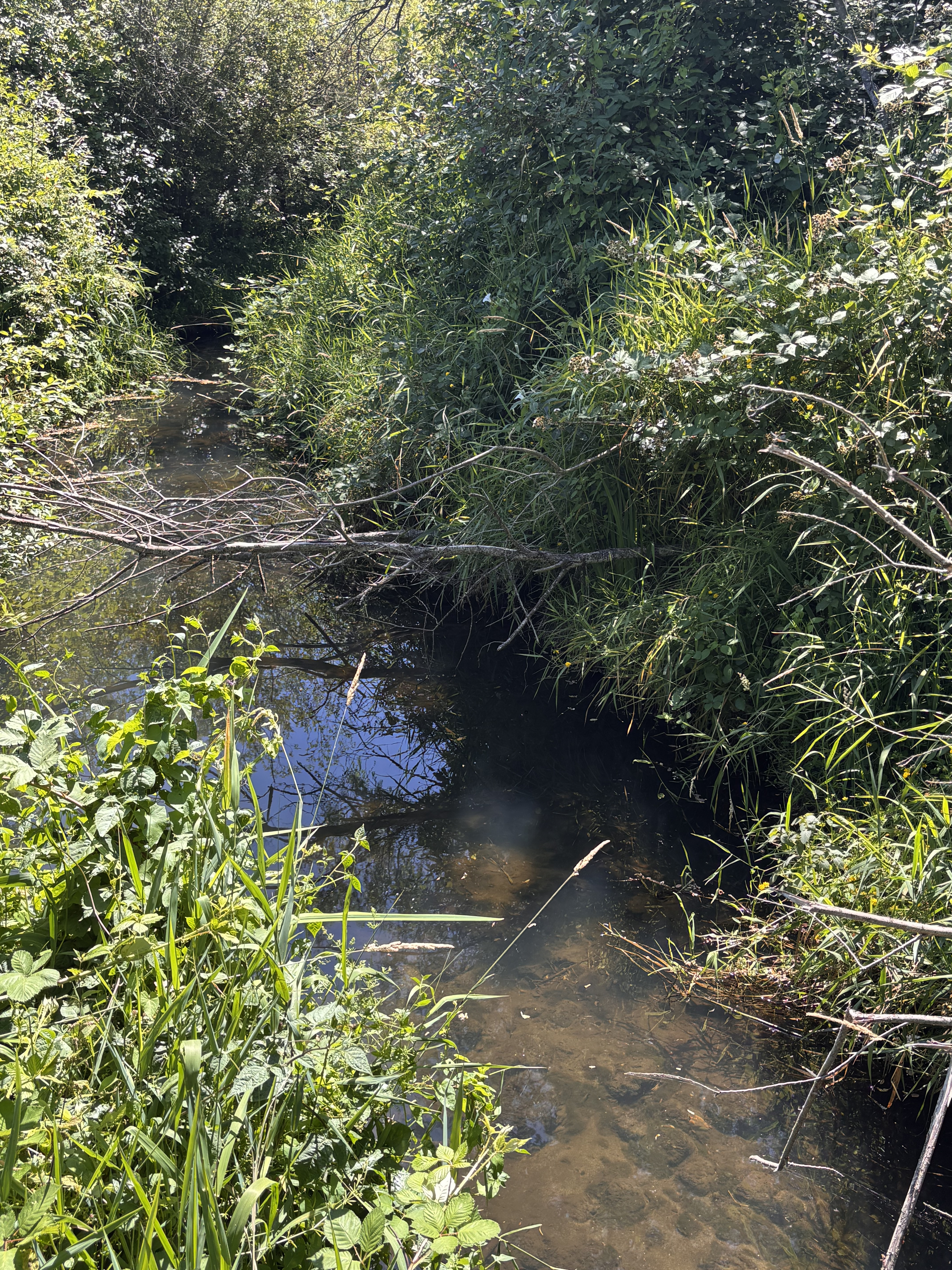
- Juanita Creek near Lake Washington

- Location of the mouth of Juanita Creek in Washington Juanita Creek (the United States)

Location
- Country: United States
- State: Washington
- Region: King County

Physical characteristics
- Source
  - coordinates: 47°44′03″N 122°10′44″W
- Mouth
  - location: Lake Washington
  - coordinates: 47°42′14″N 122°13′05″W
  - elevation: 16 ft (4.9 m)
- Length: 5 mi (8.0 km)
- Basin size: 6.6 sq mi (17 km^{2})
- Discharge
  - location: near Kirkland
  - average: 11.1 cu ft/s (0.31 m^{3}/s)
  - minimum: 0.61 cu ft/s (0.017 m^{3}/s)
  - maximum: 740 cu ft/s (21 m^{3}/s)

Juanita Creek is a creek in King County, Washington that flows through the city of Kirkland. The creek runs about 5 miles (8.0 km) before entering Lake Washington's Juanita Bay at Juanita Beach Park.

== See also ==
- List of rivers of Washington (state)
