= Nasty Creek =

Stream in Yakima County, Washington, United States

- Location within Washington (state)

Location
- Country: United States
- State: Washington
- County: Yakima County

Physical characteristics
- Source: 46°33′30.43″N 121°02′58.28″W
  - location: Foundation Ridge
- Mouth: Ahtanum Creek
  - coordinates: 46°33′50.44″N 120°55′03.27″W
- Length: 3.7 miles (6.0 km)

Nasty Creek is a stream located in the upper reach of the Ahtanum Creek watershed, in Yakima County, Washington, in the United States. The stream flows 3.7 miles (6.0 km) from its source near Foundation Ridge to its confluence with the North Fork of Ahtanum Creek.

Geologist George Otis Smith noted in a 1902 report that Nasty Creek may have belonged to the Cowiche Mountain drainage system before being later diverted during the formation of a monocline.

== See also ==
- List of rivers of Washington (state)
