= Wilder Creek =

Stream in Washington, U.S.

Coordinates: 48°33′55″N 119°53′36″W

Wilder Creek is a stream in the U.S. state of Washington.

Wilder Creek was named after H. A. Wilder, a pioneer miner.

== See also ==
- List of rivers of Washington (state)
