= Finn Creek =

Stream in Washington, U.S.

Coordinates: 46°29′23″N 123°49′55″W

Finn Creek is a stream in the U.S. state of Washington.

A large share of the first settlers were Finns, hence the name.

== See also ==
- List of rivers of Washington (state)
