= O'Toole Creek =

Stream in Washington, U.S.

Coordinates: 48°30′47″N 121°55′05″W

O'Toole Creek is a stream in the U.S. state of Washington.

O'Toole Creek was named after W. D. O'Toole, a businessperson in the mining industry.

== See also ==
- List of rivers of Washington (state)
