= Chinook River =

- Location of the mouth of the Chinook River in Washington

Location
- Country: United States
- State: Washington
- County: Pacific

Physical characteristics
- Source: Willapa Hills
  - coordinates: 46°16′0″N 123°53′10″W
  - elevation: 900 ft (270 m)
- Mouth: Columbia River
  - location: Baker Bay
  - coordinates: 46°18′7″N 123°58′19″W
  - elevation: 0 ft (0 m)
- Length: 6.5 mi (10.5 km)
- Basin size: 13.6 mi^{2} (35 km^{2})

The Chinook River is a short stream located near the mouth of the Columbia River in the U.S. state of Washington.

== Course ==
The Chinook River originates just north of the Astoria–Megler Bridge, near Scarboro Hill in the Willapa Hills. The river flows west and northwest, just north of Fort Columbia State Park, Chinook Point, and the small town of Chinook on the Columbia River.

Its lower course runs through the Chinook Wildlife Area. The river empties into Baker Bay, part of the Columbia River, at Stringtown, about 2 mi (3.2 km) east of Ilwaco. Baker Bay is part of the Columbia River Estuary and located just east of Cape Disappointment and the Pacific Ocean.

== See also ==
- List of rivers of Washington (state)
- Tributaries of the Columbia River
