= Cecil Creek =

Stream in Washington, U.S.

Coordinates: 48°47′55″N 119°38′50″W

Cecil Creek is a stream in the U.S. state of Washington.

Cecil Creek was named after Julia Cecil, an Indian who settled there.

== See also ==
- List of rivers of Washington
