= Asbestos Creek Falls =

Waterfall in Washington (state), United States

Coordinates: 48°11′30″N 121°34′50″W

- Interactive map of Asbestos Creek Falls
- Location: Near Darrington, Snohomish County, Washington
- Type: Tiered
- Total height: 800 feet (240 m)
- Number of drops: 11
- Total width: 15 feet (4.6 m)
- Watercourse: Asbestos Creek

Asbestos Creek Falls is a waterfall on Asbestos Creek, a small tributary of Clear Creek, located just below the mouth of Helena Creek. The falls are thought to stand between 500 and 1000 feet high.

The falls are thought to drop around 1000 feet however only the bottom 500 feet, due to the shape of the gorge, can be seen from the base. Also, accessing the falls has become very difficult because of numerous washouts that have occurred along Clear Creek Road.

The falls can be seen partially seen from Clear Creek Road from where it crosses Asbestos Creek and views of the upper 500 feet or so of the falls can likely only be attained from the other side of the valley.

The falls are often confused with Asbestos Falls, which lies on Clear Creek itself.
