= Sail River =

- Location of the mouth of the Sail River in Washington

Location
- Country: United States
- State: Washington
- County: Clallam

Physical characteristics
- Source: Olympic Mountains
  - coordinates: 48°18′25″N 124°34′15″W
- Mouth: Strait of Juan de Fuca
  - coordinates: 48°21′33″N 124°33′35″W

The Sail River is a stream on the Olympic Peninsula in the U.S. state of Washington. It originates in the northern Olympic Mountains and flows north, emptying into the Strait of Juan de Fuca.

== Course ==
The Sail River originates in the northwestern portion of Olympic Peninsula. It flows north through the Makah Reservation, entering the Strait of Juan de Fuca about a mile east of Neah Bay.

== See also ==
- List of rivers of Washington (state)
