= Pressentin Creek =

Stream in Washington, U.S.

Coordinates: 48°31′02″N 121°51′09″W

Pressentin Creek is a stream in the U.S. state of Washington.

Pressentin Creek was named after Charles von Presentin, an early settler.

== See also ==
- List of rivers of Washington (state)
