= Grandy Creek =

Stream in Washington, U.S.

Coordinates: 48°31′07″N 121°52′50″W

Grandy Creek is a stream in the U.S. state of Washington. The creek was named after John Grandy, a pioneer settler.

== See also ==
- List of rivers of Washington (state)
