= Clear Creek (Sauk River tributary) =

- Location of the mouth of Clear Creek in Washington Clear Creek (Sauk River tributary) (the United States)

Location
- Country: United States
- State: Washington
- Counties: Snohomish County

Physical characteristics
- Source: Clear Lake (Washington)
  - location: North Cascades
  - coordinates: 48°06′45″N 121°38′35″W
  - elevation: 2,255 ft (687 m)
- Mouth: Sauk River
  - location: Upstream from Darrington
  - coordinates: 48°13′9″N 121°34′7″W
  - elevation: 617 ft (188 m)

Clear Creek is a creek in Snohomish County, Washington. It is a tributary of the Sauk River and enters the river just above the community of Darrington.

== Course ==
The creek rises in Clear Lake near Granite Pass in the Boulder River Wilderness. It briefly flows east before soon turning north. About 1.3 miles (2.1 km) after turning north, the creek is joined by one of its largest tributaries, Copper Creek. After receiving Copper Creek, the creek turns northeast. It flows northeast for about 3.9 miles (6.3 km) until it turns north again at its confluence with another major tributary, Helena Creek. Just above the mouth of Helena Creek, the creek drops over Asbestos Falls. Just below the Helena Creek confluence, the creek is joined by tiny Asbestos Creek, which drops over tall Asbestos Creek Falls just before entering Clear Creek. From there, the creek flows north for about 2 miles to its confluence with the Sauk. The creek is joined by Burns Creek just above where it enters the Sauk.

== See also ==
- List of rivers in Washington
