= Coweeman River =

- Location of the mouth of Coweeman River in Washington

Location
- Country: United States
- State: Washington
- County: Cowlitz

Physical characteristics
- Source: Coweeman Lake
  - coordinates: 46°08′27″N 122°27′17″W
  - elevation: 3,965 ft (1,209 m)
- Mouth: Columbia River
  - location: near Kelso
  - coordinates: 46°06′26″N 122°53′22″W
  - elevation: 23 ft (7.0 m)
- Length: 36.3 mi (58.4 km)
- Basin size: 200 sq mi (520 km^{2})

The Coweeman River is a tributary of the Cowlitz River, in the South West corner of the U.S. state of Washington. Its name comes from the Cowlitz word ko-wee-na, meaning "short one", referring to a short Indian who once lived along the river.

== Course ==
The Coweeman River originates in Coweeman Lake and flows west for 36 miles (58 km) to join the Cowlitz River near the confluence of the Cowlitz and Columbia River at Kelso. Just below the mouth of its first named tributary, Butler Creek, the river drops over Washboard Falls.

== See also ==
- List of rivers of Washington (state)
- Tributaries of the Columbia River
