= Edwards Creek (Churchill County, Nevada) =

Stream in Nevada, U.S.

Coordinates: 41°23′04″N 117°18′07″W

Edwards Creek is a stream in the U.S. state of Nevada.

Edwards Creek has the name of an early settler.
