= Salmon escapement =

Salmon escapement is the amount of a salmon population that does not get caught by commercial or recreational fisheries and return to their freshwater spawning habitat. Estimates of these amount are calculated with statistical analysis using data collected during that particular run season. These estimations help produce fishing quotas for the return year of the juveniles born for that years run, or can be used to determine the health of a salmon stock.

Estimating escapement for salmon can be done several ways: The most commonly used method is the area-under-the-curve model, and other methods include the change-in-ratio method, carcass-counting surveys, and weir-count surveys.

== Escapement goals ==
Biological Escapement Goals (BEGs) are the number of returning salmon that would provide the largest possible amount of take while ensuring that enough salmon will successfully spawn, so that their offspring will replace the harvested amount in future runs. A BEG model is applied when a fishery harvests salmon in a manner that will allow managers to determine the desired spawning destination for that population of salmon.

Sustainable Escapement Goals (SEGs) are the amount of escapement needed, specified by an index or escapement estimate; that is known to provide a sustainable yield over a period of up to 10 years. The SEG is applied when there is not enough catch data for that stock such as the Alaska salmon fishery which harvests salmon in a non-terminal area and the desired spawning destination for that salmon population is unknown.

Optimal Escapement Goals (OEGs) consider biological and allocative influences and it may produce a diffident estimate then SEG or BEG goals. This goal is used when a managing groups wants to reallocate quotas, and essentially determines who may fish and where they fish for certain salmon populations. The OEG will allow sustainability and will be conveyed as a range with the lowest possible escapement level set to be above the estimate for Sustainable escapement.

== See also ==
- Maximum sustainable yield
- Sustainable fishery
