= Arkansaw =

Arkansaw may refer to:

- Arkansaw, Wisconsin, a census-designated place in Pepin County
- Arkansaw Territory, a U.S. territory from 1819 to 1836

== See also ==
- Arkansas, a homophone
