= Holly, Washington =

Unincorporated community in Washington, United States

- Unincorporated community
- Location in Washington and the United States Holly (the United States)
- Coordinates: 47°33′28″N 122°58′37″W
- Country: United States
- State: Washington
- County: Kitsap
- Time zone: UTC-8 (Pacific (PST))
  - Summer (DST): UTC-7 (PDT)
- GNIS feature ID: 1520865

Holly is an unincorporated community in Kitsap County, Washington, United States. Named in 1895 for the presence of a large holly tree, Holly is located in the southwestern corner of the county, along the Hood Canal.

Holly is a residential area, although a substantial number (around half) of residents are summer-only. Holly is known for its isolation, as well as its unusually high rain totals. There are no commercial establishments in the community, as it is accessible only through back roads and is not near any major population center.
