= Whiskey Dick Creek =

Coordinates: 47°24′36″N 119°55′29″W

Whiskey Dick Creek is a creek in Douglas County, Washington near the unincorporated community of Palisades.
