= Goodman Creek =

- Mouth of Goodman Creek
- Native name: Tsa-dis-qualth (North American Indian languages)

Location
- Country: United States
- State: Washington

Physical characteristics
- Source: unnamed high point
  - coordinates: 47°49′05″N 124°18′05″W
  - elevation: 480 m (1,570 ft)approx.
- Mouth: Pacific Ocean
  - coordinates: 47°49′21″N 124°30′45″W
  - elevation: 0 m (0 ft)
- Length: 15 mi (24 km)approx.
- Basin size: 31.09 sq mi (80.5 km^{2})

Goodman Creek is a stream in the U.S. state of Washington.

Goodman Creek bears the name of a government surveyor. It has also been known by the name Tsa-dis-qualth, meaning "narrow mouth overhung with bush". In one late 19th century publication it was also referred to as the Keh-chen-whilt River.

== Tributaries ==
- Falls Creek
- Minter Creek

== See also ==
- List of rivers of Washington (state)
