= Elk River Natural Resources Conservation Area =

Conservation area in Washington state, US

Coordinates: 46.840°N 124.014°W

Elk River Natural Resources Conservation Area, totaling is the largest, highest quality estuarine system remaining in Washington or Oregon. It includes diverse habitats, ranging from tideflats and sloughs, saltmarsh and freshwater wetlands, to forested uplands.

Identified as critically important waterfowl and shorebird habitat, it also includes a nesting site for bald eagle and significant habitat for elk, bear, beaver, river otter and other mammals. One population of a Washington state monitor plant species, Henderson's checker- mallow, occurs within the tidal portion of the estuary system.
