= Edwards Creek (Washington) =

Stream in Washington, U.S.

Coordinates: 48°36′21″N 119°07′05″W

Edwards Creek is a stream in the U.S. state of Washington.

Edwards Creek has the name of an early settler.

== See also ==
- List of rivers of Washington
