= Arkansas Creek =

Stream in Washington, U.S.

Coordinates: 46°15′59″N 122°55′01″W

Arkansas Creek is a stream in the U.S. state of Washington.

Arkansas Creek was named after the state of Arkansas, the native home of a large share of the first settlers.

== See also ==
- List of rivers of Washington (state)
