= Olney Creek =

Stream in Snohomish County, Washington, U.S.

Coordinates: 47°52′21″N 121°42′45″W

Olney Creek is a stream in the U.S. state of Washington, in Snohomish County.

Olney Creek bears the name of an early settler.

== See also ==
- List of rivers of Washington (state)
