= Cape Disappointment (Washington) =

Headland in Washington, United States

- Cape
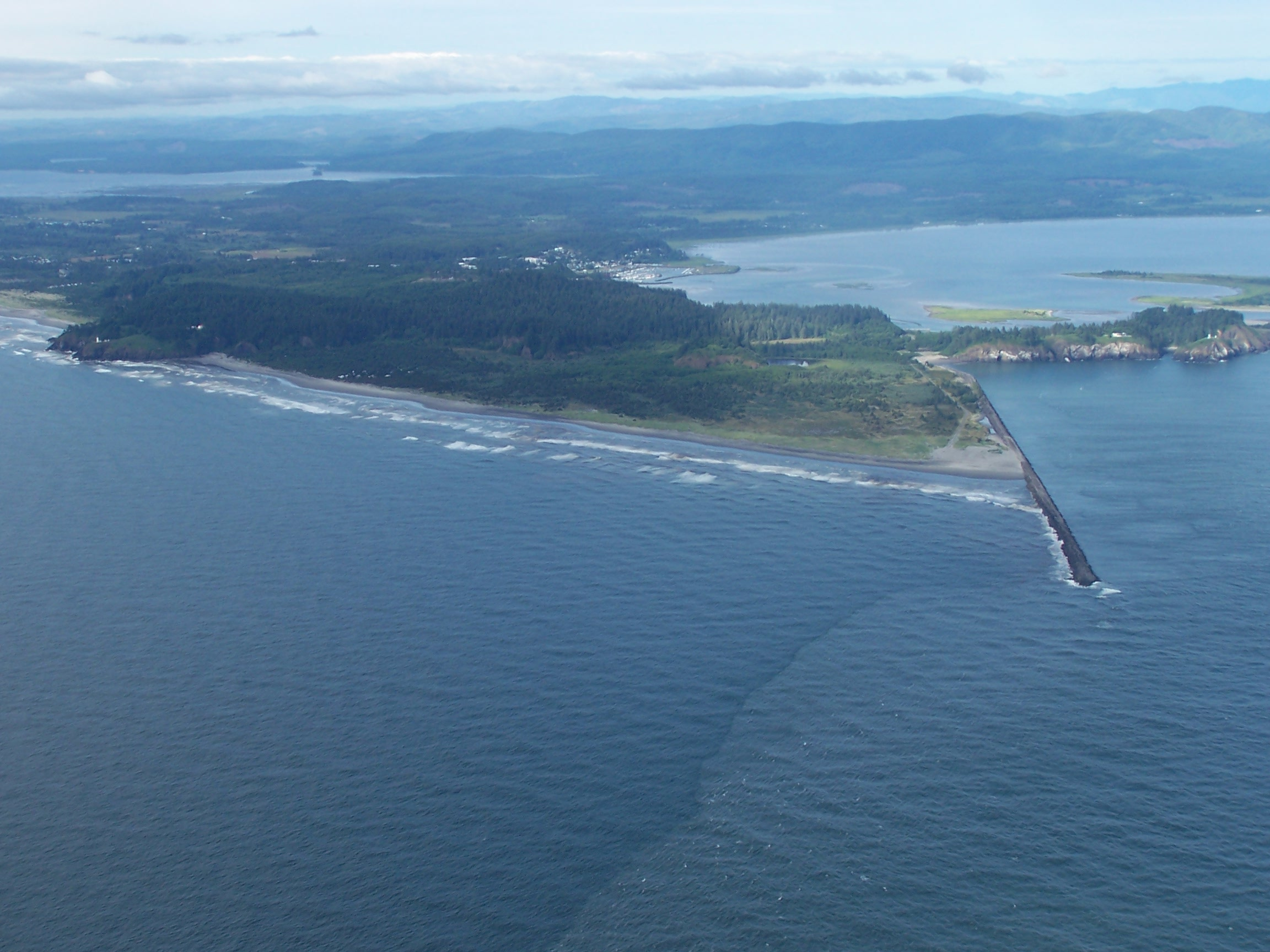
- Interactive map of Cape Disappointment
- Coordinates: 46°17′23″N 124°03′38″W
- Location: Washington, United States
- Water bodies: Baker Bay; Columbia River; Pacific Ocean

Cape Disappointment is a headland of the Pacific Northwest, located at the extreme southwestern corner of Washington, United States, on the north side of the Columbia River bar (across from Oregon) and just west of Baker Bay. The point of the cape is located on the Pacific Ocean in Washington's Pacific County, approximately two miles (3.2 km) southwest of the town of Ilwaco. Cape Disappointment sees about 2,552 hours of fog a year, which is the equivalent of about 106 days—making it one of the foggiest places in the United States.

== History ==
The cape was named on July 6, 1788, by British fur trader John Meares, who was sailing south from Nootka Island, Canada, in search of trade. He mistook the mouth of the Columbia River for a bay, which the ship could not enter due to a shallow shoal. Just missing the discovery of the river mentioned by Francisco Antonio Mourelle, he named them Cape Disappointment and Deception Bay. George Vancouver credits John Meares in his account when he saw Cape Disappointment on April 27, 1792.

== Tourism ==
Cape Disappointment State Park is located on the cape, as is the Cape Disappointment Lighthouse. United States Coast Guard Station Cape Disappointment is situated on the river near the state park. The station's crewmembers respond to 300–400 calls for assistance every year.

The State Park is an affiliate site of Lewis and Clark National Historical Park.

== Gallery ==
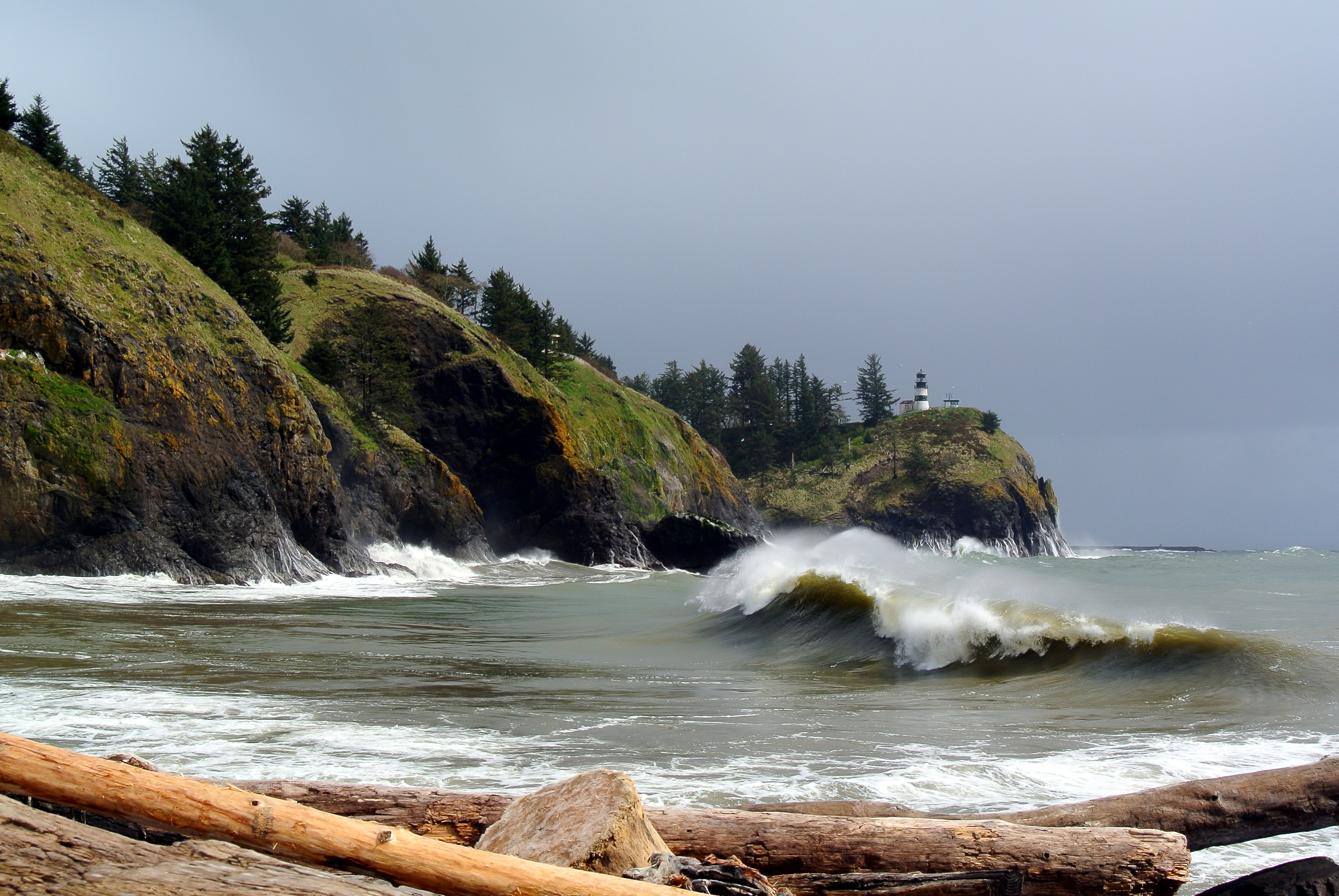
South side of Cape Disappointment

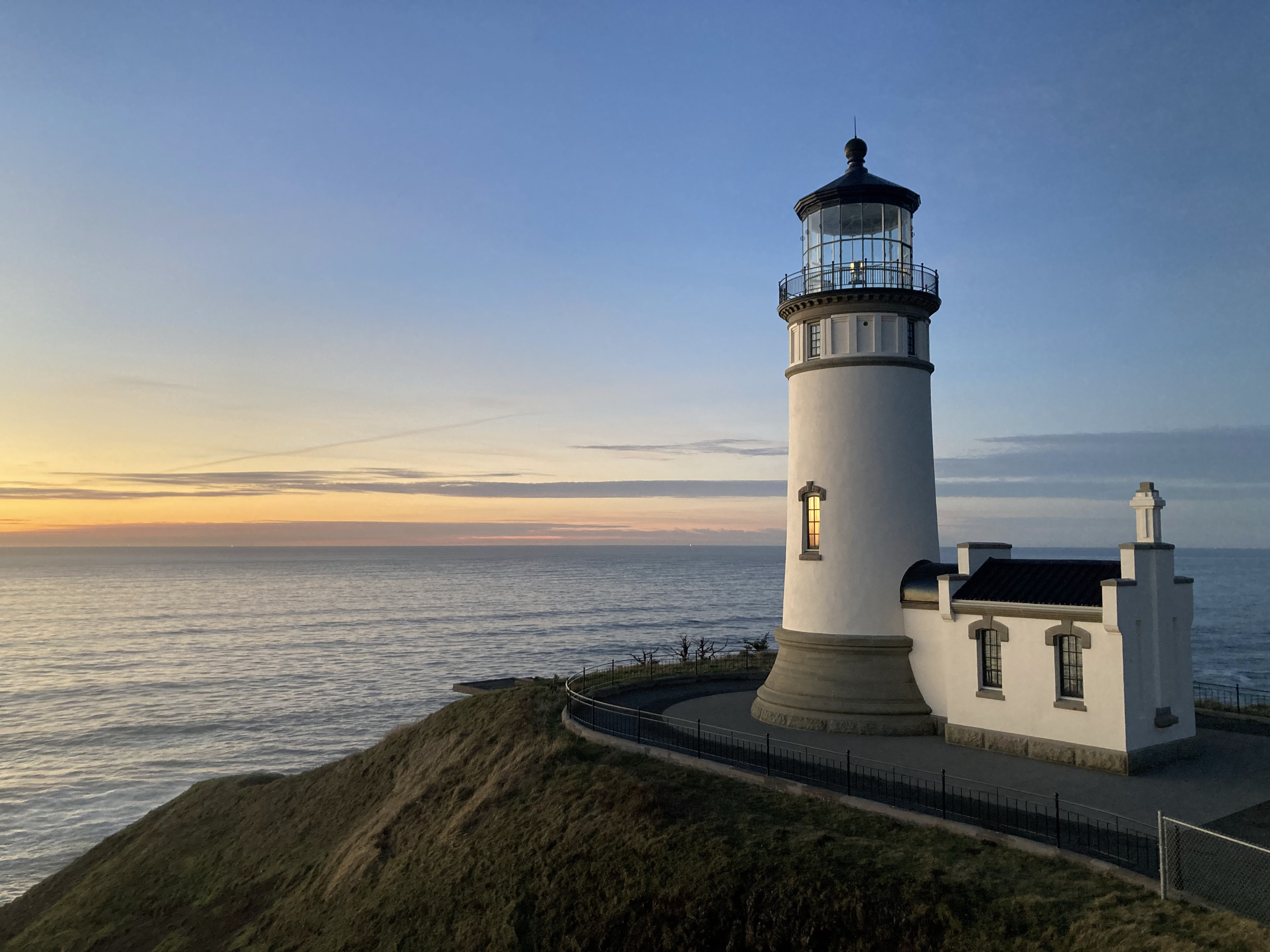
North Head Light

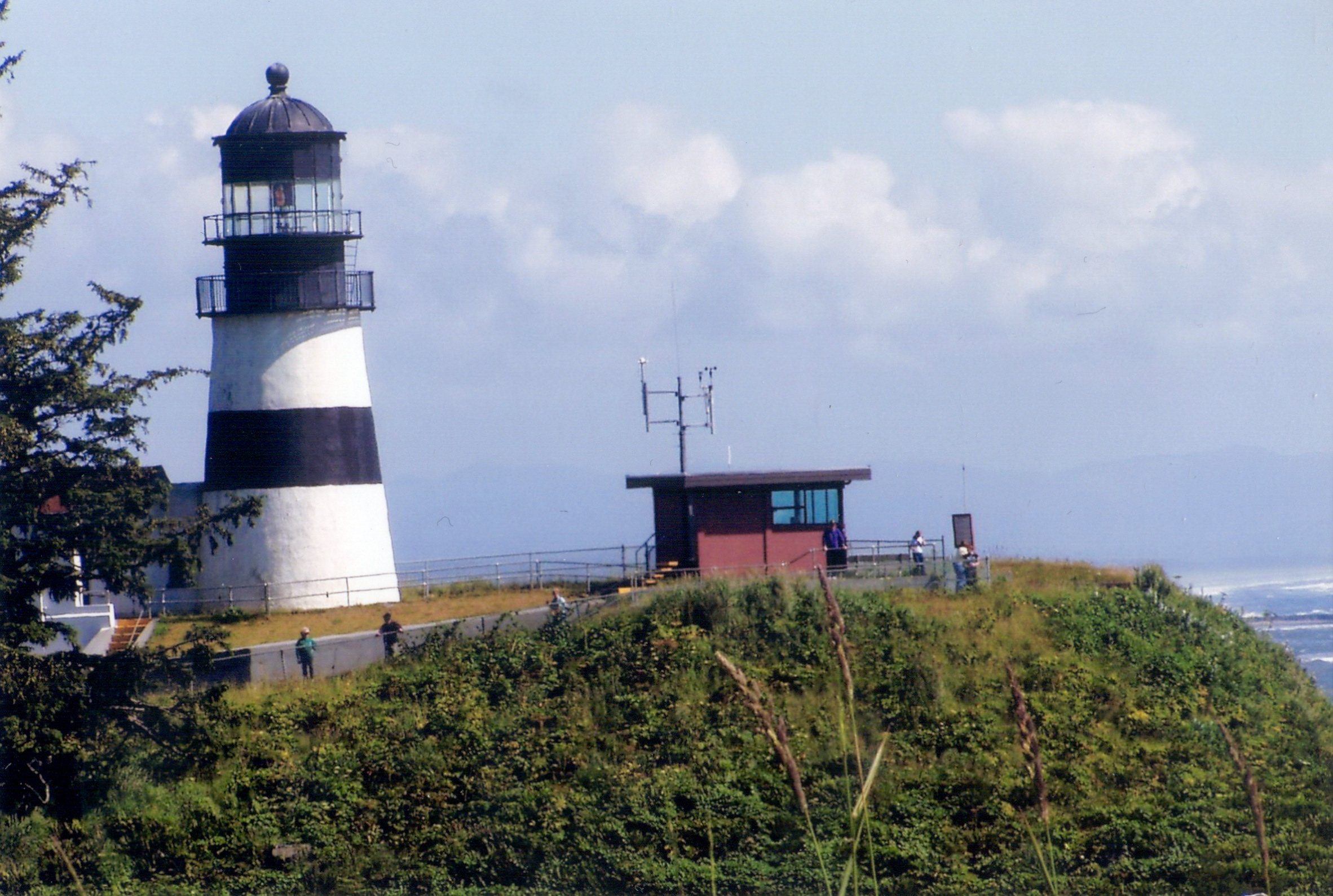
Cape Disappointment Light

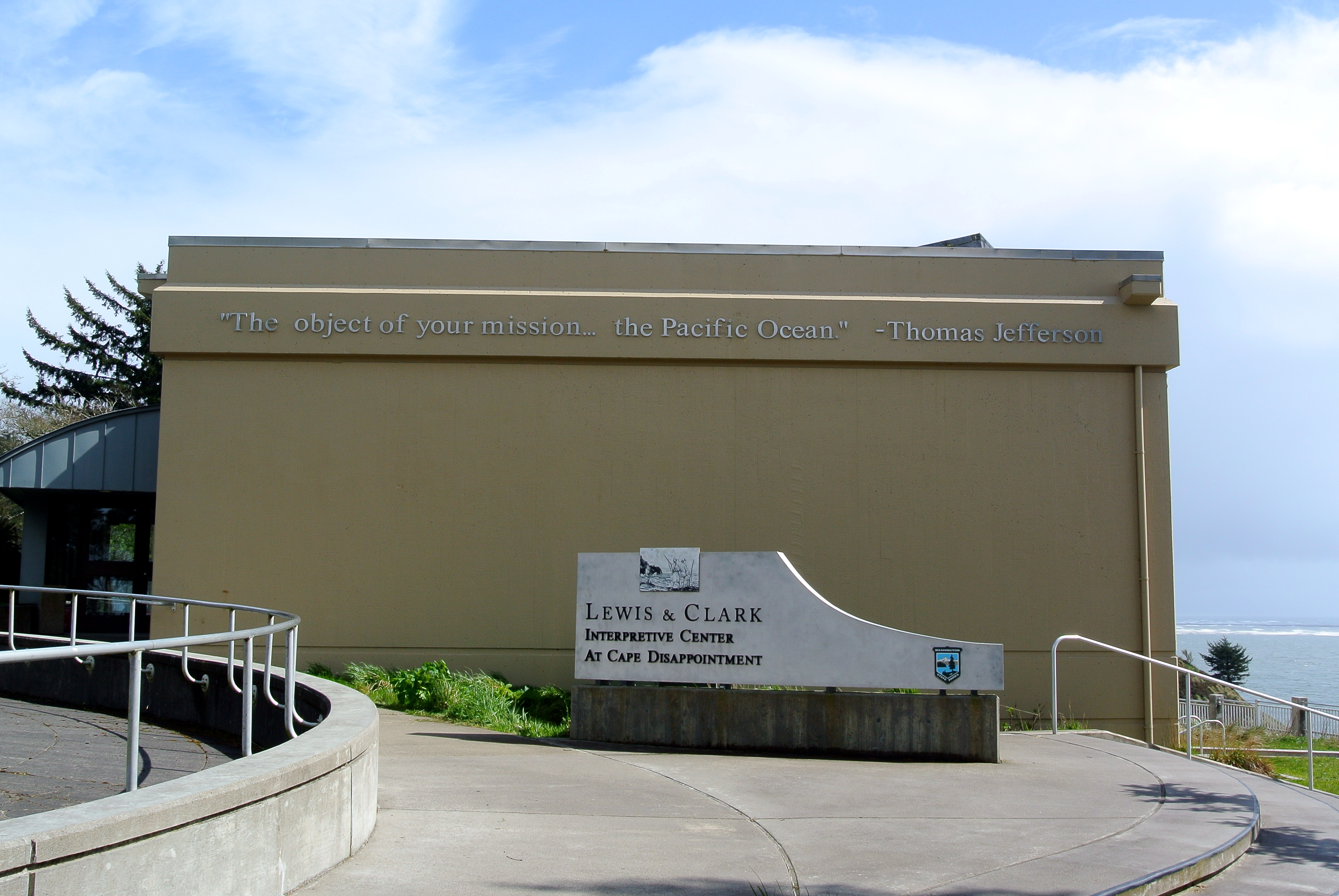
Lewis and Clark Interpretive Center
