= Mount Tom =

Mount Tom may refer to:

== Australia ==
- Mount Tom, Queensland, a locality in the Gladstone Region

== United States ==
Any of 42 mountains in the United States, including:

- Mount Tom (California), a peak in the Sierra Nevada
- Mount Tom (Connecticut), a small mountain in Mount Tom State Park
- Mount Tom (Massachusetts), a peak of the Metacomet Ridge in the Connecticut River Valley
  - Mount Tom Range, the entire ridge along which Mount Tom lies
  - Mount Tom State Reservation
  - Mount Tom, Massachusetts, village at the foot of the mountain
  - Mount Tom Station, a former power plant
- Mount Tom (New Hampshire), a summit in the White Mountains
- Mount Tom (Herkimer County, New York), an elevation in Herkimer County, New York
- Mount Tom (Vermont), a summit of Woodstock, Vermont, and location of Marsh-Billings-Rockefeller National Historical Park
- Mount Tom (Washington)

== See also ==
- Tom Mount
