= Sante Graziani =

American painter

- Born: Sante Graziani; March 11, 1920; Cleveland, Ohio, U.S.
- Died: March 15, 2005 (aged 85); Princeton, Massachusetts, U.S.
- Education: Cleveland Institute of Art; Yale University
- Occupations: Artist, painter, muralist, art educator
- Years active: c. 1942–2005
- Employer(s): Yale University School of Art; School of the Worcester Art Museum; Paier College of Art
- Known for: Murals, painting, art education
- Notable work: Lovers Leap (1942); Joseph Deford and His Friends Build the First Cabin in Bluffton (1941)
- Awards: Pulitzer Traveling Scholarship in Art

Sante Graziani (March 11, 1920 – March 15, 2005) was an American artist and art educator known for his public murals.

== Education ==
Graziani was born in Cleveland, Ohio, to parents who had immigrated from Tuscany. He was educated at the Cleveland Institute of Art and later at Yale University. At 22, he received the Pulitzer traveling scholarship in Art.

== Career ==
After serving in the military in World War II, Graziani began a career as an art educator. He taught at Yale University School of Art from 1946 to 1951. His students at that time included Claes Oldenburg. From 1951 to 1981, Graziani was at the School of the Worcester Art Museum in Worcester, Massachusetts, where he taught and was also Dean. In 1982, he moved to Paier College of Art in Hamden, Connecticut, where he was Dean until 1995 and Dean Emeritus that same year until his death.

Graziani initially gained recognition for his murals. Among his works were several murals at the public library in Holyoke, Massachusetts, depicting among others Elizur Holyoke and Rowland Thomas; a mural finished in 1942 at the Columbus Junction, Iowa, post office titled Lovers Leap; a post office mural, Joseph Deford and His Friends Build the First Cabin in Bluffton (1941) in Bluffton, Ohio; and one at the Museum of Fine Arts in Springfield, Massachusetts.

In later works that drew on iconic paintings from art history for inspiration, he produced paintings and murals that reflected the influence of pop art. He has been described as "a witty, clever painter and draughtsman, [who] likes to paraphrase the old masters, copying some of their most famous works, and incorporating them into vividly colored hard-edge backgrounds."

In the years around the United States bicentennial celebration in 1976, he produced paintings that included references to well known images of George and Martha Washington. He was commissioned to paint a colorful and decorative mural featuring an image of George Washington on the side of a building in Worcester, Massachusetts, in that era. He was also commissioned to design a stamp for the U.S. postal service.

Graziani died at his daughter's home in Princeton, Massachusetts, aged 85.
