= Elsie May Kittredge =

American botanist and curator (1870-1954)

- Born: May 14, 1870; Dayton, Ohio, United States
- Died: April 23, 1954 (aged 83); Middlebury, Vermont, United States
- Burial place: Woodland Cemetery and Arboretum, Dayton, Ohio
- Occupations: Botanist, photographer, and curator for the New York Botanical Gardens
- Years active: 1910–1954
- Known for: Billings-Kittredge Herbarium

Elsie May Kittredge (May 14, 1870 – 1954) was an American botanist, photographer, watercolor painter, and curator for the New York Botanical Gardens. She, with Elizabeth Billings, established the Billings-Kittredge Herbarium in Woodstock, Vermont.

The standard author abbreviation Kittr. is used to indicate this person as the author when citing a botanical name.

== Life and career ==
=== Early life ===
Elsie May Kittredge was born on May 14, 1870, in Dayton, Ohio. The family moved to New York City in 1879.

Kittredge began working for the Brooklyn Botanical Garden in 1910, making and coloring lantern slides. In 1917, she was named assistant curator at the New York Botanical Gardens, and charged with its collection of lantern slides and negatives. That same year, she travelled to Woodstock, Vermont, to assist Elizabeth Billings in collecting plant specimens.

=== Woodstock ===
Elizabeth Billings was an amateur botanist, daughter of Frederick Billings, and heiress to his estate (now Marsh-Billings-Rockefeller National Historic Park). Billings had previously studied grasses at the New York Botanical Gardens. This led to the establishment of the Billings-Kittredge Herbarium, for which 1128 specimens were collected and preserved. Much of the collecting was done on Mount Tom, although the women also collected in other areas of Woodstock. Kittredge discovered a new form of maidenhair fern on Mount Tom, which she named Miss Billings Fern, latin name Adiantum pedatum forma Billingsae, in honor of Billings; however, this name is no longer used. The two women found over 50 plants that were previously not known to occur in Vermont.

In addition to the specimens, Kittredge assisted Billings with the Fernery, her private fern garden. It was to the Fernery where Kittredge transplanted the maidenhair fern she discovered. Kitteredge led at least one public tour, for the Hartland Nature Club, of the Fernery. Both she and Billings were members of the Hartland Nature Club, as well as the Vermont Botanical and Bird Club.

== Death ==
Kittredge died on March 23, 1954, at the age of 83, while in Vermont. Kittredge herself never married or had children.

== Legacy ==
The Billings-Kittredge Herbarium is currently housed at Marsh-Billings-Rockefeller National Historic Park; it had previously been housed in Dartmouth College, the Woodstock Historical Society, and the Vermont Institute for Natural Sciences. The full collection has been digitized by the National Park Service.

In addition to the Billings-Kittredge Herbarium, specimens from Kittredge exist within the collections of The Academy of Natural Sciences of Drexel University and Harvard University.

== Works ==
- Ferns and Flowering Plants of Woodstock, Vermont (1931)
- Supplement to the Ferns and Flowering Plants of Woodstock, Vermont (1936)
- The Flora of Vermont (editor, 1937)
- Grasses and Sedges of Woodstock, Vermont (1939)
