= Woden (The Valhallas) =

Mountain in Washington (state), United States

Woden – The Valhallas
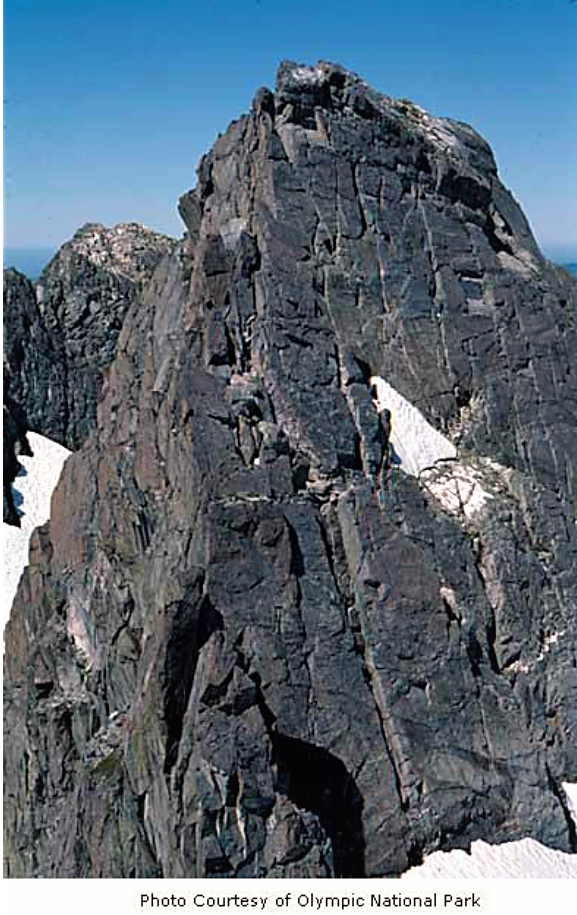
- Woden, from Hugin

Highest point
- Elevation: 6,038 ft (1,840 m)
- Prominence: 1,038 ft (316 m)
- Parent peak: Mount Tom (7,076 ft)
- Isolation: 2.96 mi (4.76 km)
- Coordinates: 47°45′04″N 123°44′41″W

Geography
- Location within Washington (state) Location within the United States
- Country: United States
- State: Washington
- County: Jefferson
- Protected area: Olympic National Park
- Parent range: Olympic Mountains
- Topo map: USGS Mount Olympus

Geology
- Rock age: Eocene

Climbing
- First ascent: 1966 by Ernie Labistida, Ivan Lindgren
- Easiest route: class 4 climbing via NE corner

Woden is a 6,038-foot (1,840-metre) mountain summit located within Olympic National Park in Jefferson County of Washington state. Its nearest higher neighbor is Mount Tom, 3 mi (4.8 km) to the north-northwest, and Mount Olympus rises 3.8 mi (6.1 km) to the north-northeast. Woden is the highest point in The Valhallas, a sub-range south of Mount Olympus. Precipitation runoff from the mountain drains into tributaries of the South Fork Hoh River and Queets River. The Geri-Freki Glacier, which descends north from Woden. is the only glacier in The Valhallas.

== History ==
These peaks were originally named "Pleiades Peaks" by Robert L. Wood, a reference to the seven daughters of Atlas in Greek mythology, however this name did not stick. Glenn Kelsey and Harold Pinsch climbed in this area in 1970 and are credited with the Valhallas name. In Norse mythology, "Valhalla" is a great hall located in Asgard, ruled over by the god Odin, who in Old English was known as "Woden". The peak, Woden, may have originally been named "Mount O'Neil" by the 1890 Seattle Press Expedition in honor of Lt. Joseph O'Neil, who led an earlier 1885 exploration into the Olympic wilderness. The first ascent of Woden was made in 1966 by Ernie Labistida and Ivan Lindgren.

== Climate ==
Based on the Köppen climate classification, The Valhallas are located in the marine west coast climate zone of western North America. Weather fronts originating in the Pacific Ocean travel northeast toward the Olympic Mountains. As fronts approach, they are forced upward by the peaks (orographic lift), causing them to drop their moisture in the form of rain or snow. As a result, the Olympics experience high precipitation, especially during the winter months in the form of snowfall. Because of maritime influence, snow tends to be wet and heavy, resulting in avalanche danger. During winter months weather is usually cloudy, but due to high pressure systems over the Pacific Ocean that intensify during summer months, there is often little or no cloud cover during the summer. The months July through September offer the most favorable weather for viewing or climbing these peaks.

== Geology ==
The Olympic Mountains are composed of obducted clastic wedge material and oceanic crust, primarily Eocene sandstone, turbidite, and basaltic oceanic crust. The mountains were sculpted during the Pleistocene era by erosion and glaciers advancing and retreating multiple times.

== Summits ==
Select named peaks of The Valhalla Range All are named after Norse gods, except Sleipner (Odin's horse) and Pelton.

Name	Elevation (feet)	Prominence (feet)	First ascent	Reference
Woden	6,038	1,038	1966	
Hugin	6,000+	80	1966	
Munin	6,000+	160	1971	
Thor	5,968	328	1971	
Loki	5,920+		1971	
Baldur	5,720+	160	1971	
Mimir	5,480+	40	1978	
Vili	5,487	87	1978	
Frigga	5,406	246	1971	
Bragi	5,400+	40	1978	
Vidar	5,637	677	1978	
Mount Sleipner	5,520	520	1978	
Pelton Peak	5,301	541		

== Gallery ==
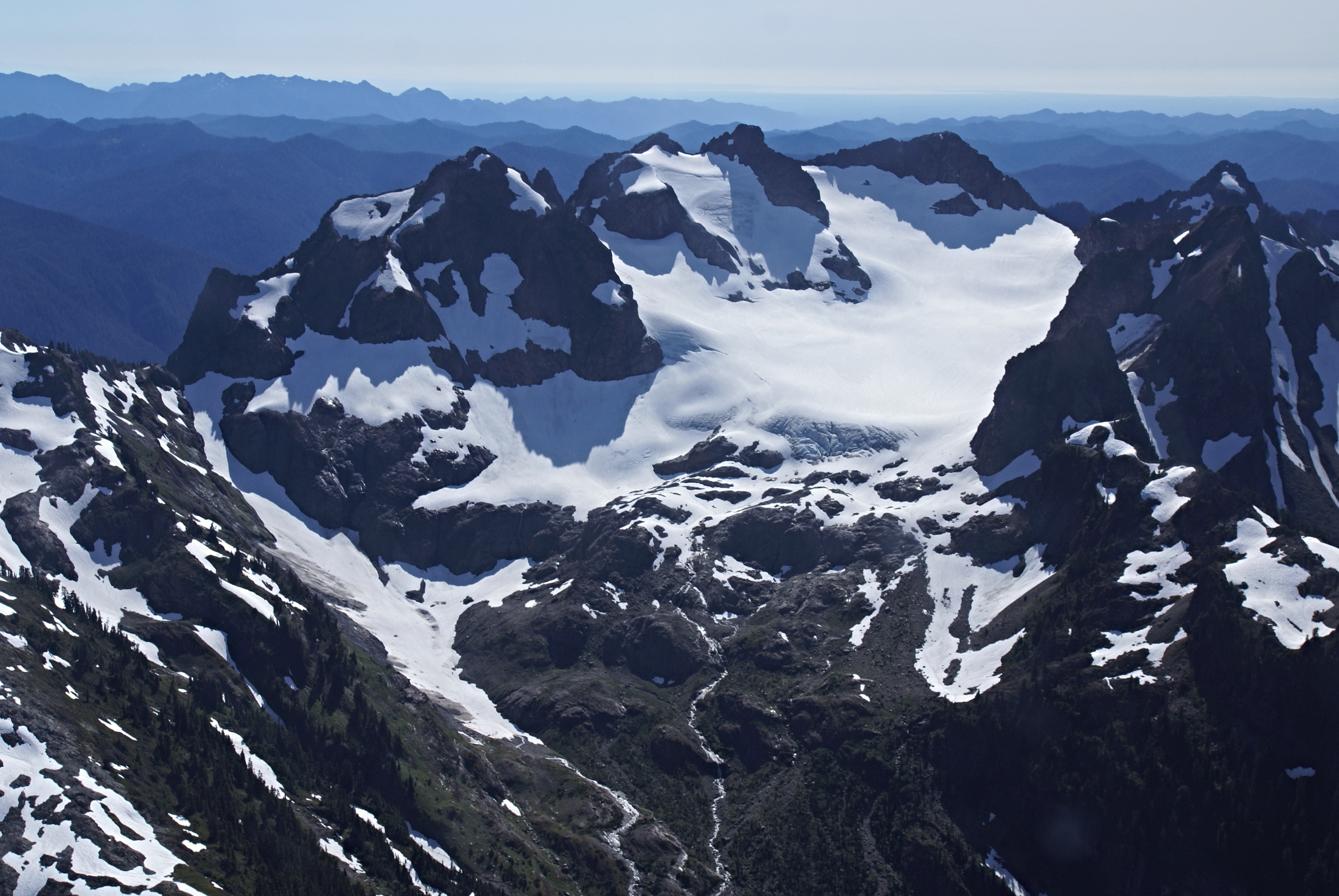
The Valhallas with Geri-Freki Glacier

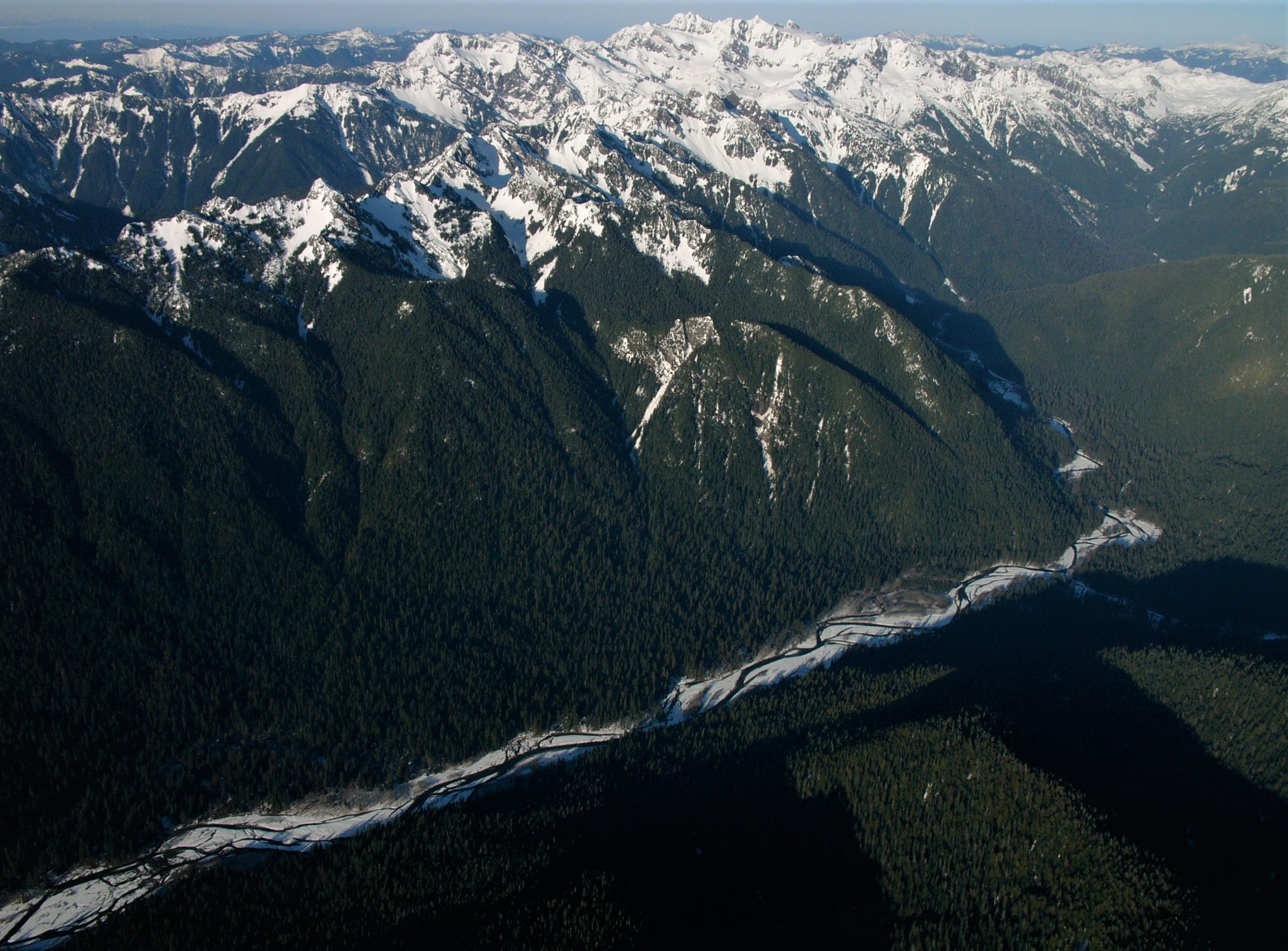
Front to back: Queets River, The Valhallas, Mt. Olympus

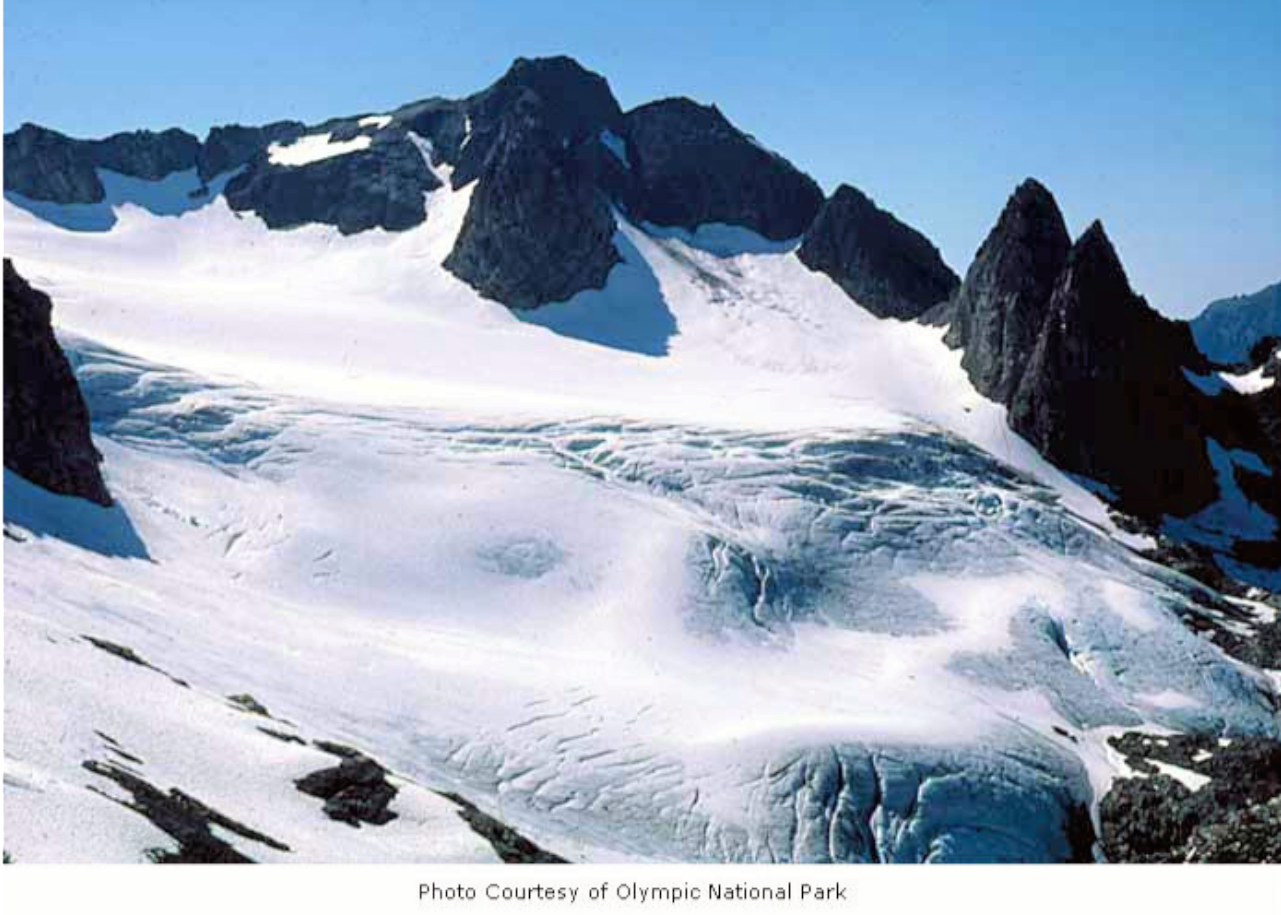
Baldur centered, Frigga to right.

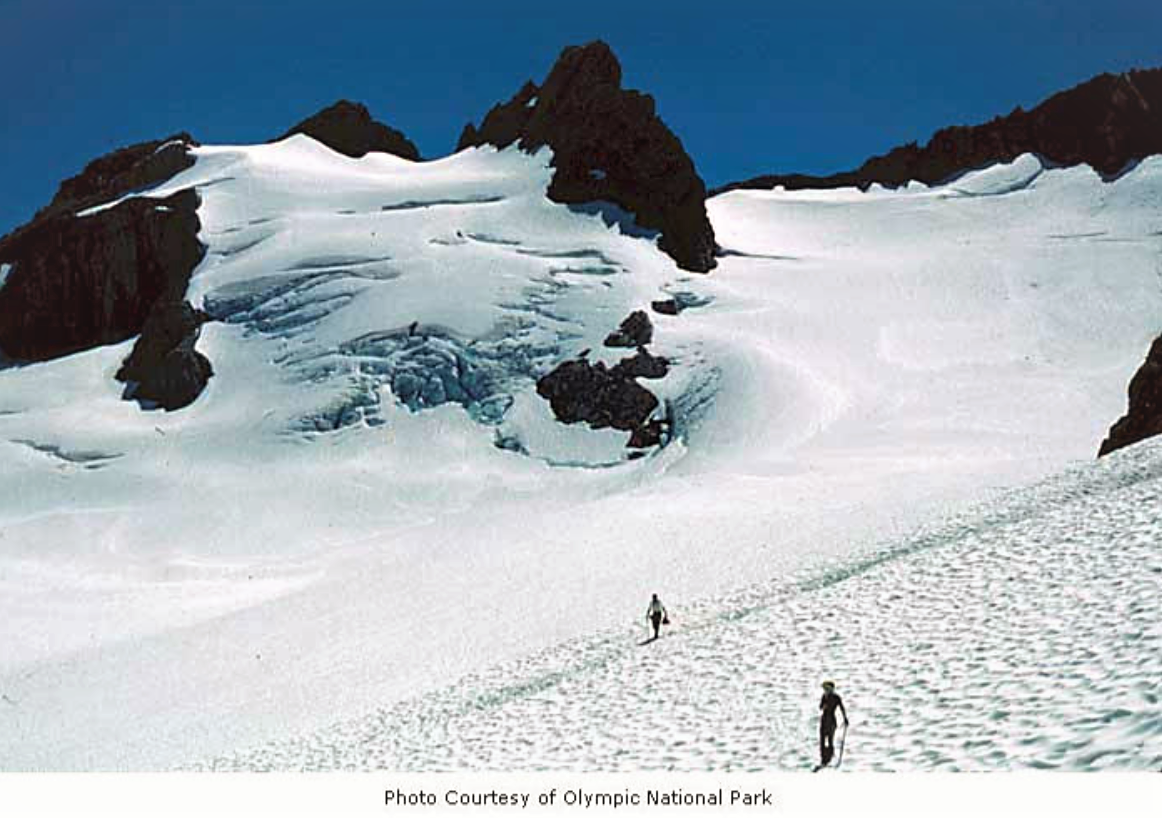
Woden centered, Hugin immediately left, Munin upper right

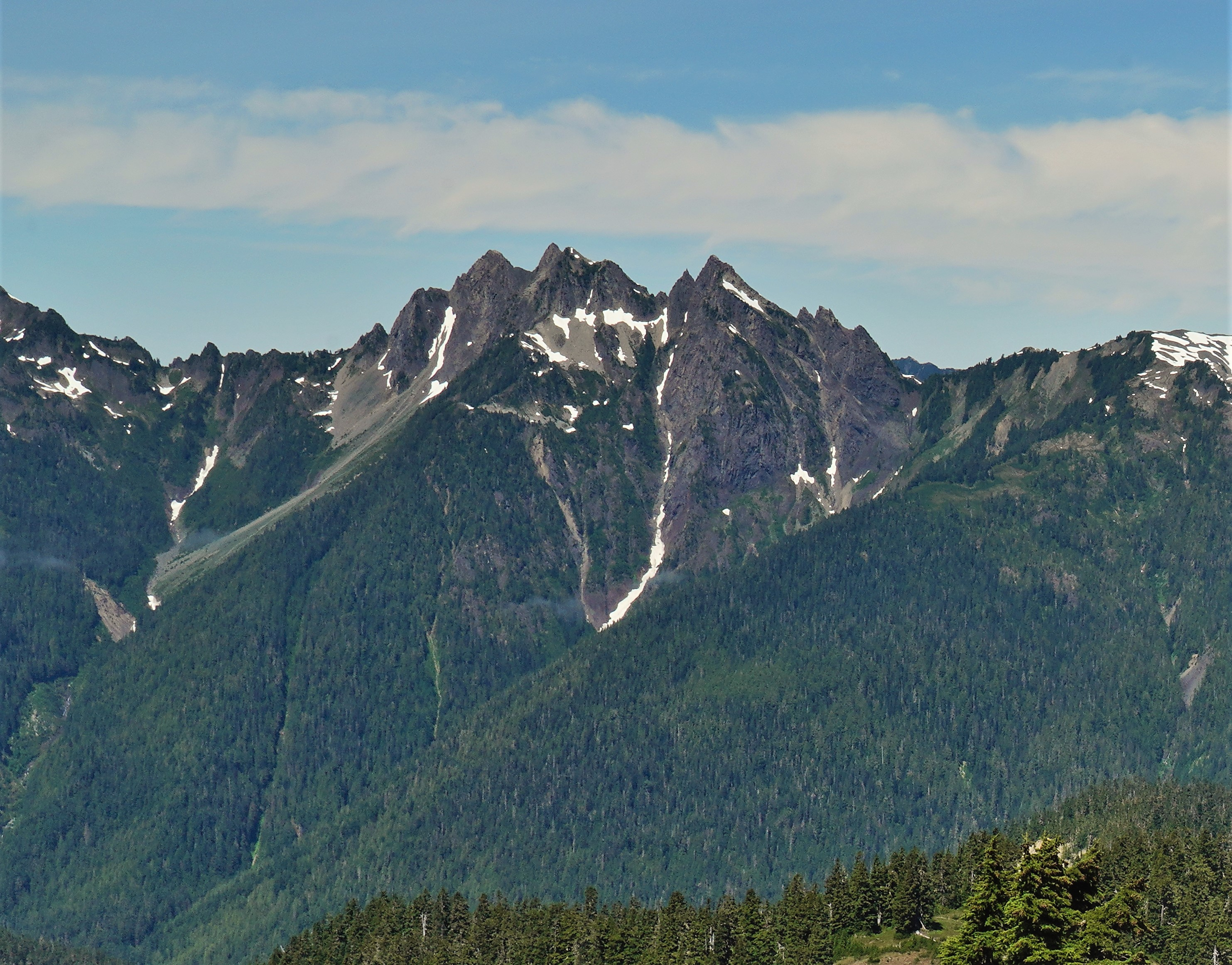
The Valhallas from the southeast

== See also ==
- Geology of the Pacific Northwest
