= The Meritorious Price of Our Redemption =

1650 book by William Pynchon

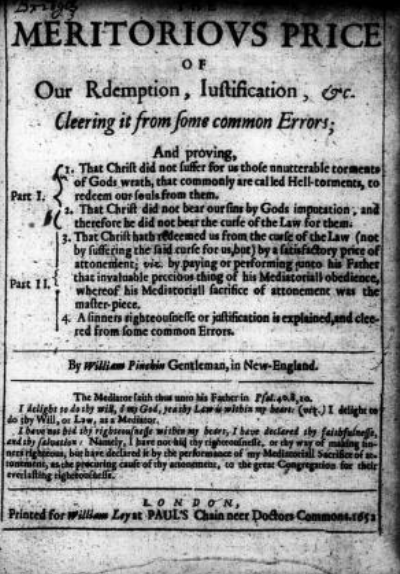
- Author: William Pynchon
- Publication date: 1650
- Publication place: England

The Meritorious Price of Our Redemption is a book written by William Pynchon and published in England in 1650. Pynchon expressed views which the Massachusetts General Court found to be full of errors and heresies. The court condemned the book to be burnt on the Boston Common. It thus became the first book banned by English colonists in New England.

== The first printing ==
The Meritorious Price of Our Redemption was first printed in 1650, under the imprint "London: Printed by J.M. for George Whittington, and James Moxon, and are to be sold at the blue Anchor in Corn-hill neer the Royall Exchange, 1650."
