= Joseph E. Muller =

- Born: June 23, 1908; Holyoke, Massachusetts, US
- Died: May 16, 1945 (aged 36) near Ishimmi, Okinawa Island
- Burial place: National Memorial Cemetery of the Pacific, Honolulu, Hawaii
- Military career
- Allegiance: United States of America
- Branch: United States Army
- Service years: 1942 - 1945
- Rank: Sergeant
- Units: 305th Infantry Regiment, 77th Infantry Division
- Conflicts: World War II: Battle of Okinawa
- Awards: Medal of Honor

Joseph E. Muller (June 23, 1908 – May 16, 1945) was a United States Army soldier and a recipient of the United States military's highest decoration—the Medal of Honor—for his actions in World War II during the Battle of Okinawa.

Muller joined the Army from New York City in March 1942 and by May 15, 1945, was serving as a Sergeant in Company B, 305th Infantry Regiment, 77th Infantry Division. On that day, during a battle for a ridge near Ishimmi on Okinawa in the Ryukyu Islands, he exposed himself to enemy fire and charged the Japanese positions alone. The next morning, when Japanese soldiers made an attempt to re-take the ridge, Muller again charged and routed them. When one of the Japanese soldiers threw a hand grenade into his foxhole, he threw himself onto the device to protect two of his comrades. He died in the resulting explosion and, on July 17, 1946, was posthumously awarded the Medal of Honor.

Aged 36 at his death, Muller was buried at the National Memorial Cemetery of the Pacific in Honolulu, Hawaii.

== Medal of Honor citation ==
Sergeant Muller's official Medal of Honor citation reads:

He displayed conspicuous gallantry and intrepidity above and beyond the call of duty. When his platoon was stopped by deadly fire from a strongly defended ridge, he directed men to points where they could cover his attack. Then through the vicious machinegun and automatic fire, crawling forward alone, he suddenly jumped up, hurled his grenades, charged the enemy, and drove them into the open where his squad shot them down. Seeing enemy survivors about to man a machinegun, He fired his rifle at point-blank range, hurled himself upon them, and killed the remaining 4. Before dawn the next day, the enemy counterattacked fiercely to retake the position. Sgt. Muller crawled forward through the flying bullets and explosives, then leaping to his feet, hurling grenades and firing his rifle, he charged the Japs and routed them. As he moved into his foxhole shared with 2 other men, a lone enemy, who had been feigning death, threw a grenade. Quickly seeing the danger to his companions, Sgt. Muller threw himself over it and smothered the blast with his body. Heroically sacrificing his life to save his comrades, he upheld the highest traditions of the military service.

== See also ==
- List of Medal of Honor recipients for World War II
- Joseph E. Muller Bridge, a crossing of the Connecticut River named in honor of Muller.
