= White Glacier (Mount Tom) =

Glacier in Washington state, United States

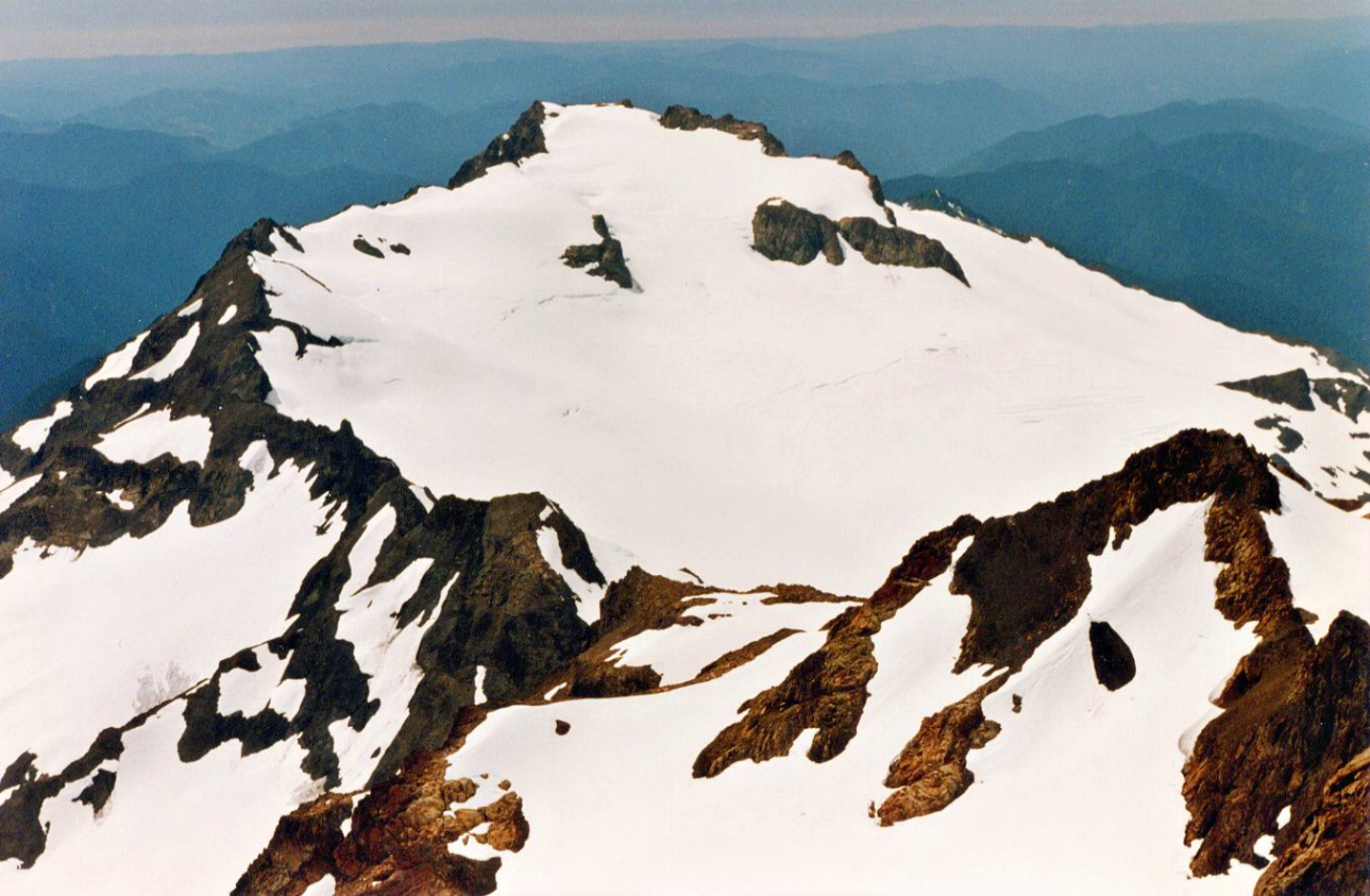
- White Glacier on Mount Tom

- Location within Washington (state)
- Type: Mountain glacier
- Location: Mount Tom, Olympic National Park, Jefferson County, Washington, USA
- Coordinates: 47°48′7.92″N 123°44′33.97″W
- Length: 1.5 mi (2.4 km)
- Terminus: Icefall and Talus

White Glacier is located on the north slopes of Mount Tom in the Olympic Mountains and Olympic National Park in the U.S. state of Washington. The main portion of the glacier heads at around 7,000 and 6,400 feet (2,100 and 2,000 m) in a cirque just under the summit rocks, while the westernmost section of White Glacier is partially separated from the rest of the glacier by several small ridges of rock and flows straight north. The principle portion of the glacier flows north as well, with a glacier toe descending to around 4,800 feet (1,500 m) where the toe turns northeast to its terminus at 4,400 feet (1,300 m). Steep ridges of rock separate an eastern portion of the White Glacier from the Blue Glacier cirque on adjacent Mount Olympus, to the east.

Like the other glaciers on Mount Olympus, White Glacier has retreated significantly since its Little Ice Age maximum. At its greatest extent in the early 19th century, it was connected with Blue Glacier and Black Glacier. During the next ~150 years it retreated rapidly and by 1952 it had retreat 10,500 feet (3,200 m). It then advanced a small distance between 1955 and 1980 due to a cooler and wetter climate. The glacier began to retreat again in the 1980s and retreated ~1000 ft (300 m) from its position in 1980 to 2006.

== See also ==
- List of glaciers in the United States

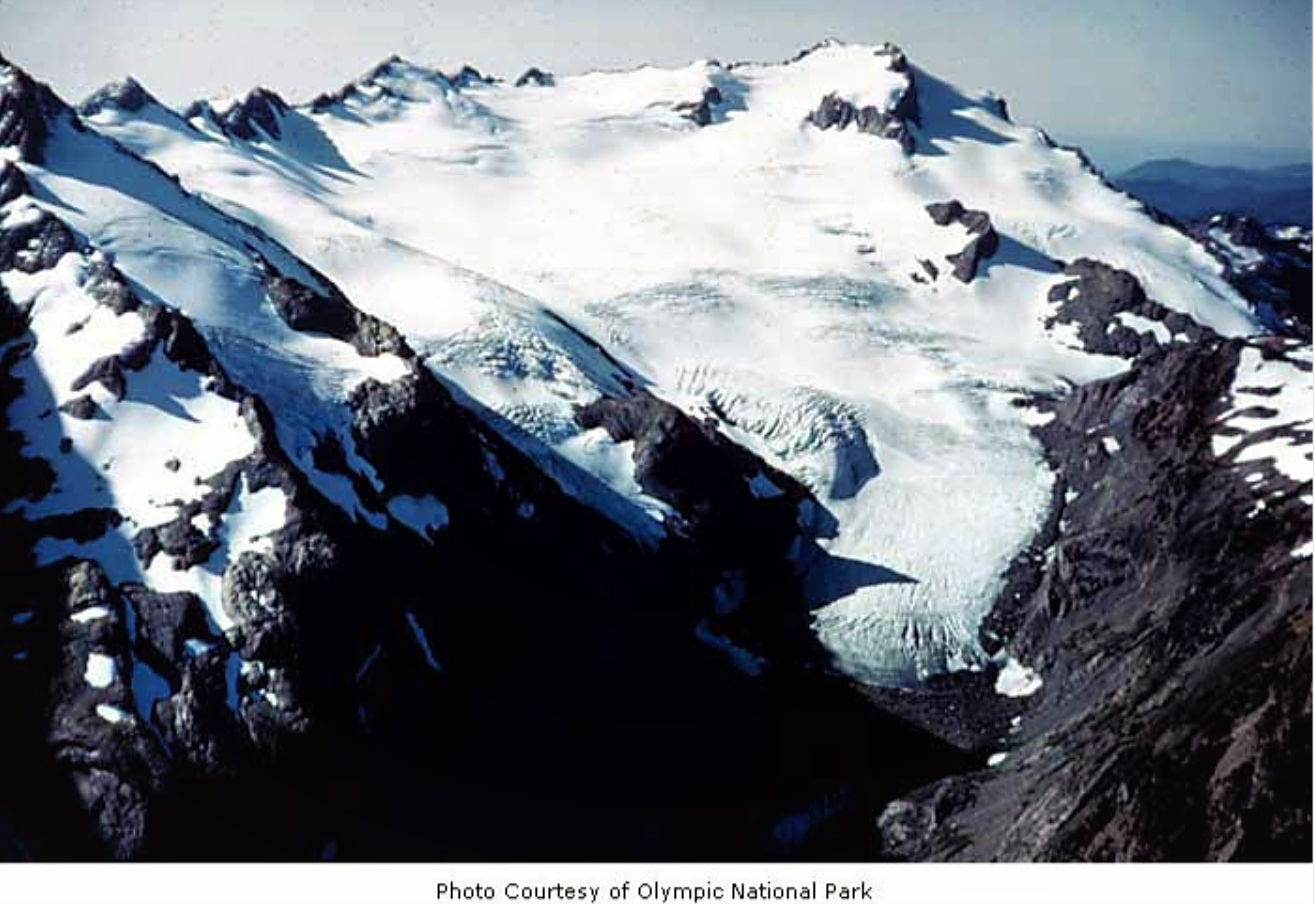
Aerial view of White Glacier on Mount Tom
