= Mount Tom, Massachusetts =

Village in Massachusetts, United States

Coordinates: 42°17′10″N 72°36′58″W

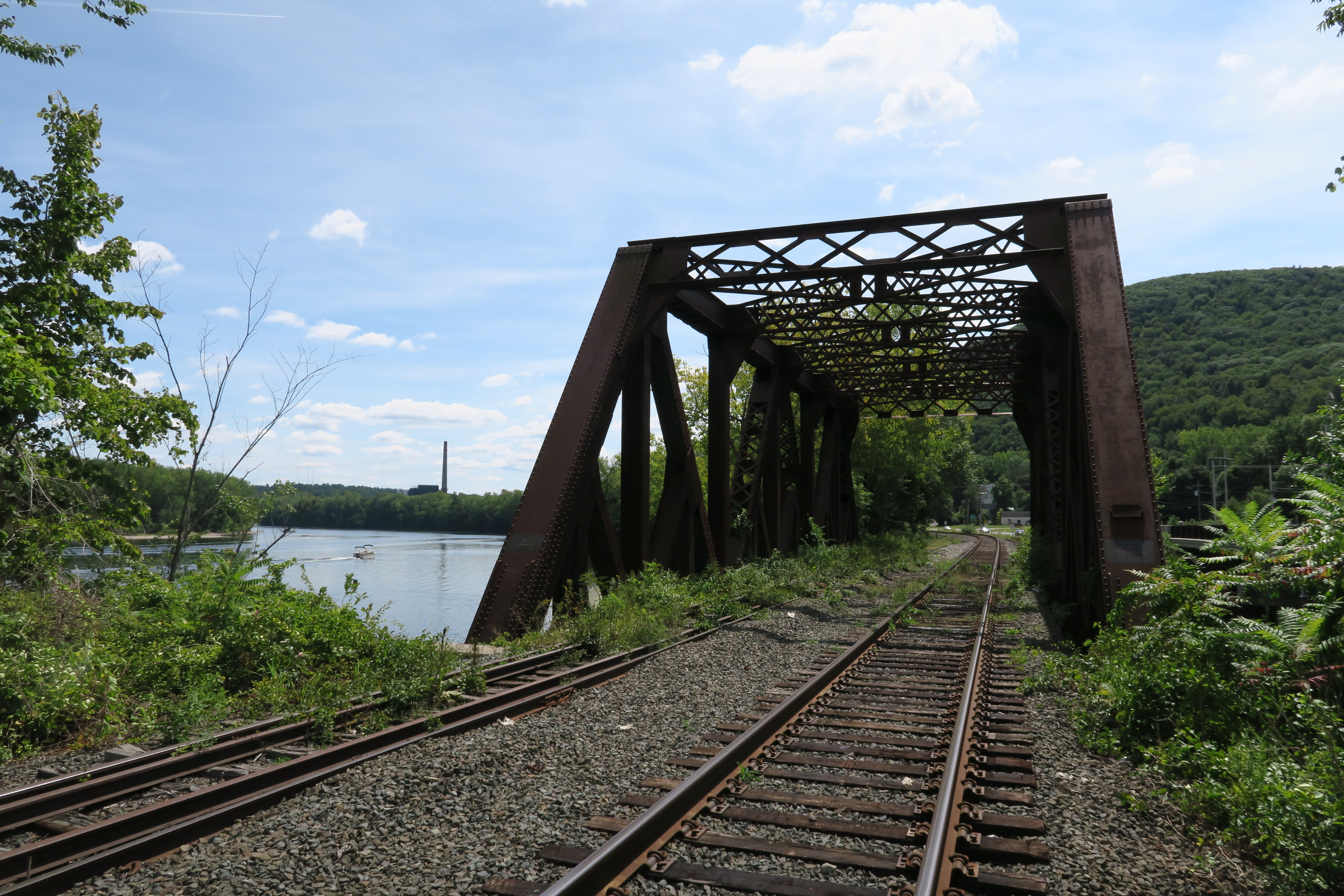
Connecticut River and railroad bridge entering Mount Tom

Mount Tom is a village in the city of Easthampton, Massachusetts, United States. It is located in a narrow strip of land between Mount Tom (the mountain) to the south, the Connecticut River to the east, and The Oxbow, an old channel of the Connecticut River, to the north. Interstate 91, U.S. Route 5, and Pan Am Railways' tracks all pass through the village's vicinity as they follow the Connecticut River.
