= Mount Tom B-17 crash =

1946 plane crash in Holyoke, Massachusetts, U.S.

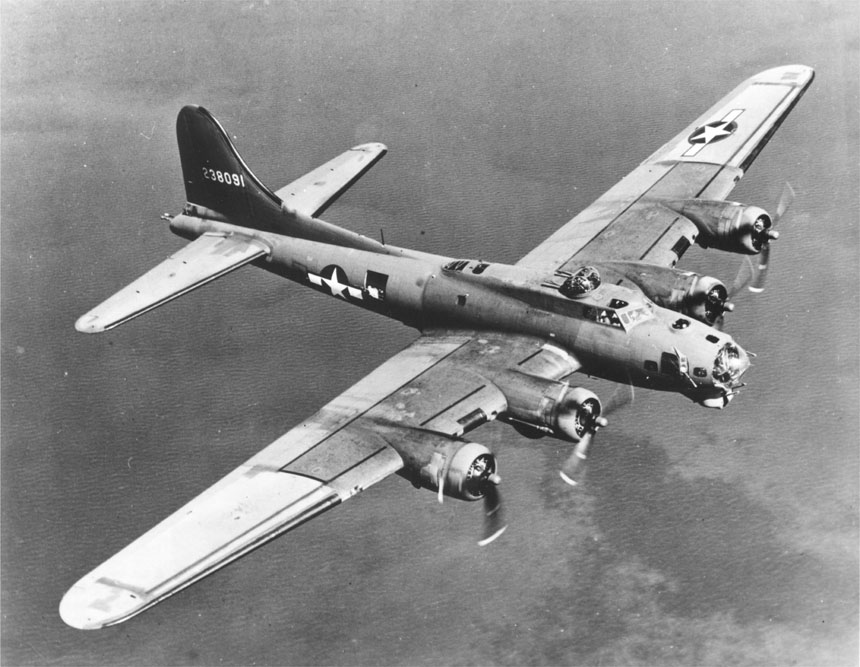
- A B-17G Flying Fortress, similar to the accident aircraft

Accident
- Date: July 9, 1946
- Summary: Controlled flight into terrain
- Site: Holyoke, Massachusetts, US; 42°14′45″N 72°38′34″W

Aircraft
- Aircraft type: Boeing B-17G-105-BO Flying Fortress
- Operator: United States Army Air Corps
- Registration: 43-39136
- Flight origin: CFB Goose Bay
- Destination: Westover Field
- Passengers: 17
- Crew: 8
- Fatalities: 25

On July 9, 1946, a Boeing B-17 Flying Fortress crashed into Mount Tom outside Holyoke, Massachusetts, United States. The crash and resulting explosion killed all 25 passengers and crew. It was the deadliest aviation accident in New England until the crash of Eastern Air Lines Flight 375 in 1960.

== Accident ==
The B-17 was a four-engine bomber that was being used by the United States Army for passenger service. Although its armaments had been removed, passenger seats had not yet been installed. On the day of the accident, the plane was transporting soon-to-be-discharged service members from CFB Goose Bay to Mitchel Air Force Base with a stopover at Westover Field. It left Goose Bay at 2 p.m. on July 9, 1946, and was due to land at Westover at 9:27 pm.

Due to fog and rain, the B-17 circled over Holyoke for almost two hours before it was cleared to land at Westover Field in Chicopee, Massachusetts. The Civil Aeronautics Authority reported that the fog would have probably prevented the pilot from seeing the beacon light atop Mount Tom. The B-17 had also been experiencing engine problems prior to lining up on the runway and beginning its descent. According to the pilot's log, there was low oil pressure on engine No. 2 and it had begun to overheat and smoke.

Around 10:20 pm, the crew made their final approach. However, due to poor visibility, they were unable to see the mountain peak on the southern face of Mount Tom. The B-17 slammed into a stone ledge about 200 feet (61 m) from the summit. The plane exploded when it hit the mountain and a second blast scattered fuel 500 feet (150 m). However, a heavy downpour that occurred shortly after the accident prevented a serious forest fire. The accident was witnessed by about 4,000 people at Mountain Park.

== Aftermath ==
Recovery efforts were hampered by the downpour as well as from fire and intense heat that persisted for 10 hours after the crash. Ambulances were not able to drive to the accident site due to rocky terrain so victims had to be carried down the mountain to Mountain Park. Identification was delayed because the men were badly burned and were from different branches of the United States Armed Forces. Many of the bodies had been severed and some were almost completely dismembered. Limbs and clothing were found as far as 300 feet (91 m) away from the plane. Identification was completed on July 16, 1946, when the body of pilot Herman J. Valdrini was identified by dental records.

The passengers were identified as 15 Coast Guardsmen, an American Red Cross official, and a United States Public Health Service Commissioned Corps doctor. All eight crew members were members of the United States Army Air Corps. The men, ranging in age from 18 to 43, came from a dozen U.S. states.

On July 10, a R5C that was flying from Rentschler Field to Westover Field crashed into the Chicopee River, not far from the site of the B-17 accident, after its right wing fell off. All seven men on board were able to parachute to safety.

== Memorial ==
The crash site was unmarked until 1994, when Norman Cote noticed a small pile of stones with a memorial note enclosed in a baggie. Cote spearheaded an effort for a permanent memorial and in July 1996, a granite memorial stone bearing the names of those who died on the flight was erected. Burn marks from the crash are still visible and hikers can still find debris from the crash in the area.

== See also ==
- List of disasters in Massachusetts by death toll
