= Joseph E. Muller Bridge =

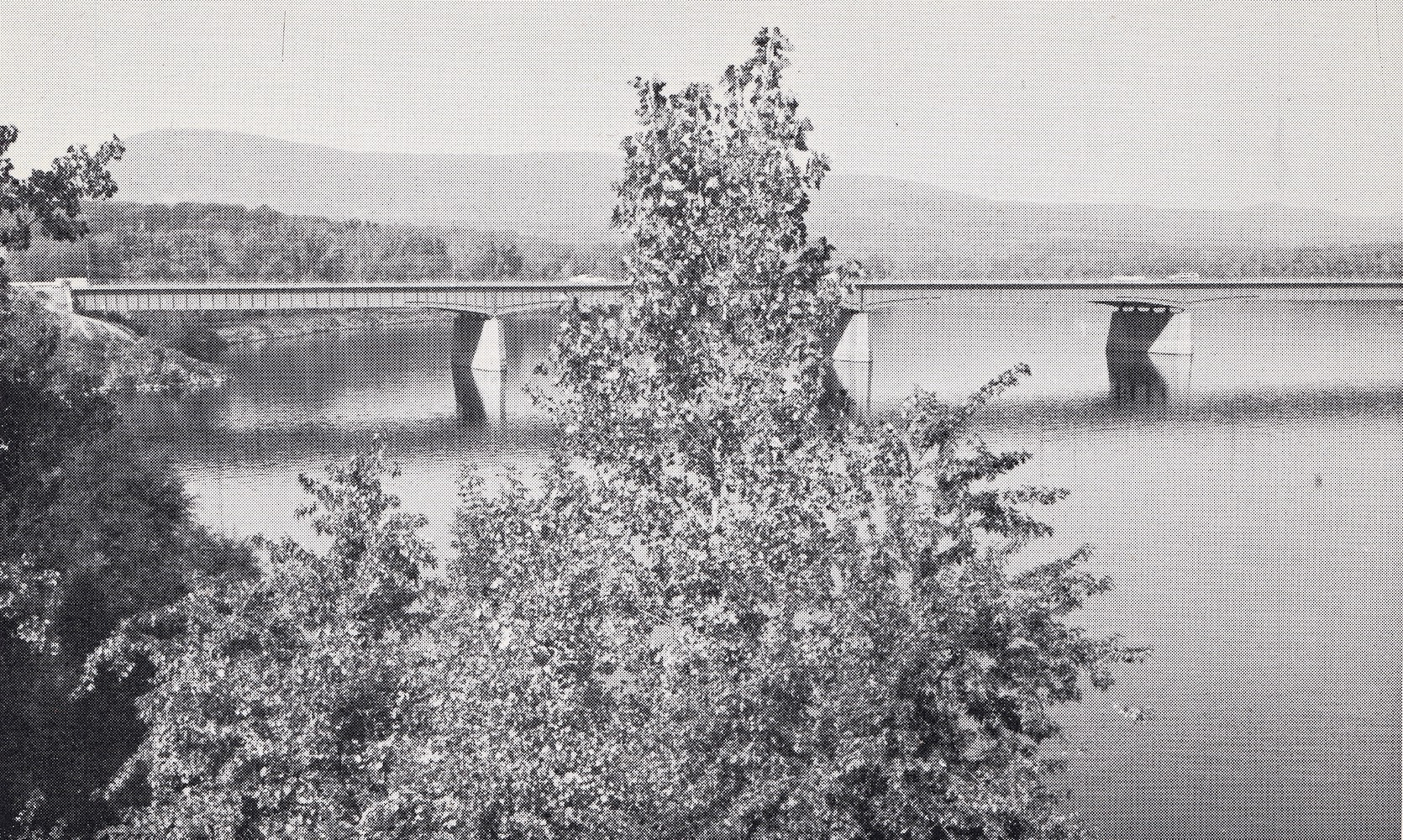
- The Muller Memorial Bridge over the Connecticut River, with Mount Tom in the background
- Coordinates: 42°12′58″N 72°36′28″W
- Carries: US 202
- Crosses: Connecticut River
- Locale: South Hadley, Hampshire County to Holyoke, Massachusetts, Hampden County; Massachusetts
- Maintained by: Massachusetts Highway Department
- ID number: H210350VPMHDNBI

Characteristics
- Design: multi-stringer Girder and Floorbeam system
- Material: Steel
- Total length: 440.1 metres (1,444 ft)
- Width: 19.2 metres (63 ft)
- No. of spans: 7
- Load limit: 52 Metric Tons

History
- Opened: 1958

Statistics
- Daily traffic: 23,491 (2018)

The Joseph E. Muller Bridge is a crossing of the Connecticut River in Western Massachusetts, connecting the communities of Holyoke and South Hadley. The bridge carries U.S. Route 202 (US 202).

== History and construction of the bridge ==
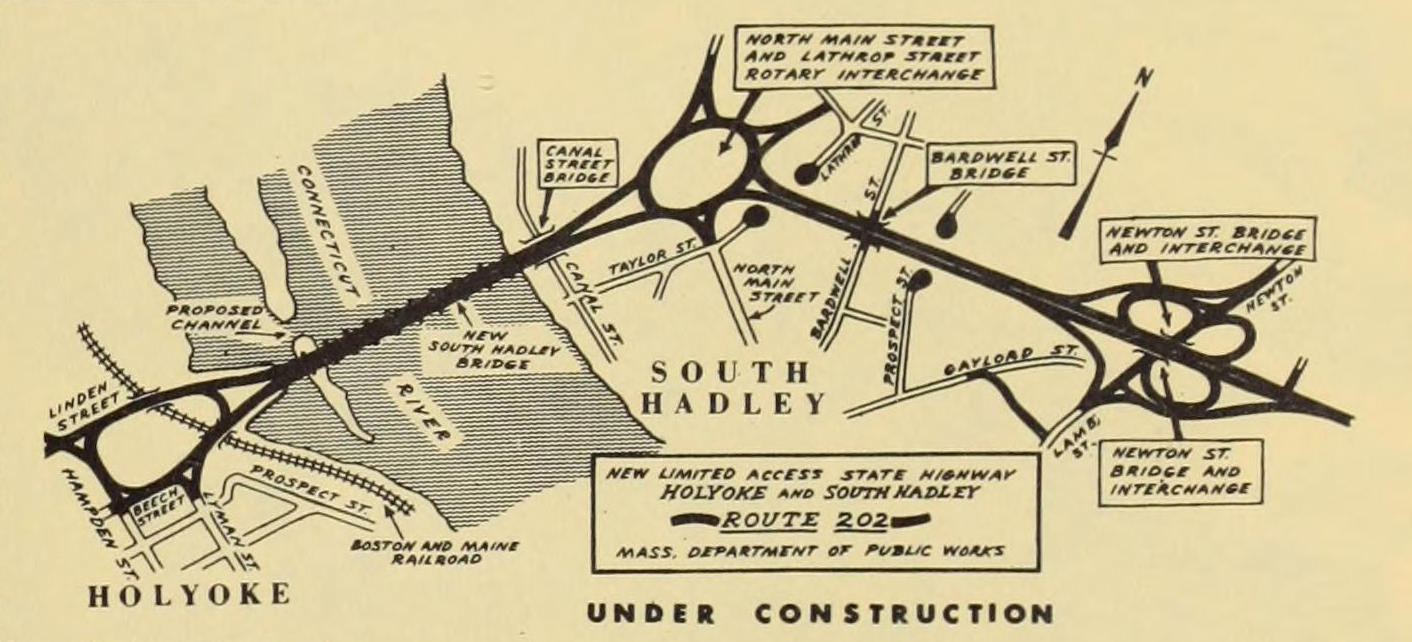
Map of the Muller Bridge and South Hadley Falls Interchange Project; constructed in 1958-1959 for $3 million ($26.8 million in 2019 USD), the highway system was also created as a support route for the then-proposed Interstate 91

The bridge was constructed in 1958 as part of a new bypass of U.S. Route 202 (Purple Heart Drive). The bypass was built in anticipation of increased traffic through downtown Holyoke heading towards South Hadley from Interstate 91, which was under construction at the time. Prior to the construction of the bridge, Route 202 used the nearby South Hadley Falls bridge (Vietnam Memorial Bridge) to cross the Connecticut River.

The bridge was named as a memorial to Holyoke native Joseph E. Muller, a recipient of the Medal of Honor.

== See also ==
- List of crossings of the Connecticut River
