= Rowland Thomas =

Massachusetts surveyor and pioneer

- A mural depicting Rowland Thomas and his men in surveying the lands by Hadley Falls
- Born: c. 1621; Berry Pomeroy, Devon, England
- Died: c. February 21, 1698 (aged 77); Springfield, Massachusetts
- Known for: Surveying of the Mount Tom Range; Founding of Springfield, Massachusetts
- Spouse: Sarah Chapin (m. 1647; died 1684)
- Children: 17 (8 died in infancy)

Rowland Thomas (c. 1621–1698) of Springfield, Massachusetts, was an English colonist, selectman, stonemason, surveyor, and proprietor, and the namesake of Mount Tom, originally known as Mount Thomas, which he was said to have surveyed in tandem with Elizur Holyoke, who so-named the Holyoke Range.

== Background ==
He was born to the knight Sir David Thomas and Anna Ison in the village of Berry Pomeroy, Devon, in England; little is recorded about the earlier life of Rowland Thomas before his arrival in Springfield, Massachusetts. On either February 14 or April 14, 1647, he married Sarah Chapin, daughter of Deacon Samuel Chapin and Cecily Penney. Thomas's exact date of arrival in the New World is unclear, but reportedly he arrived in Springfield before the year 1650, with records indicating his owning of 29.5 acres of land in the settlement in 1647, and a warrant issued by William Pynchon for a Native thief who had robbed the homestead of his wife's wardrobe in 1650. Thomas would serve in the town's government in a number of capacities, including three times as a selectman in the years 1664, 1667, and 1671. He would also serve as a juror on many cases in the settlement and, by trade, was a sawyer and stonemason, cutting rocks and hauling them to the settlement in Hadley.

== See also ==
- William Pynchon
