= Elizur Holyoke =

English colonist, namesake of Mount Hoylake

- A mural depicting Elizur Holyoke leading his men in surveying the lands by Hadley Falls, Massachusetts, accompanied by a Native American tribesman
- Born: c. 1618; England
- Died: c. February 5, 1676 (aged 58); Springfield, Massachusetts
- Known for: Surveying of the Holyoke Range; Founding of Springfield, Massachusetts
- Spouse(s): Mary Pynchon; Editha (Stebbins) Day Maynard

Elizur Holyoke (c. 1618–1676) of Springfield, Massachusetts was an English colonist, surveyor, scribe, soldier, the namesake of the mountain, Mount Holyoke, and indirectly, of the city of Holyoke, Massachusetts.

== Background ==
Elizur Holyoke arrived in the Massachusetts Bay Colony from the village of Tanworth in Warwickshire, England in 1637 or 1638 at the age of 20. He and his family settled in Chelsea, Massachusetts, where his father, Edward Holyoke Jr., had a farm. His mother was Prudence Stockton.

On September 20, 1640, Elizur Holyoke traveled to Springfield, Massachusetts and married Mary Pynchon, daughter of William Pynchon, the founder of Springfield. The Holyoke and Pynchon families appeared to be close friends, dating back to their days in England. Elizur and Mary Pynchon's marriage was the first for the then small community. (2)

In 1642, Elizur received 10 "rods" (Properly interpreted as a rood; commonly, and confusingly, spelled as "rod." A rod is a unit of length, while a rood is the corresponding unit of area. The area given to Elizur was roughly equivalent to 2½ acres [1 hectare]), near the present-day location of Chestnut Street in Springfield. In 1643, other desirable lots were given to Elizur by his father-in-law, one being between what is now Worthington and Bridge Streets.

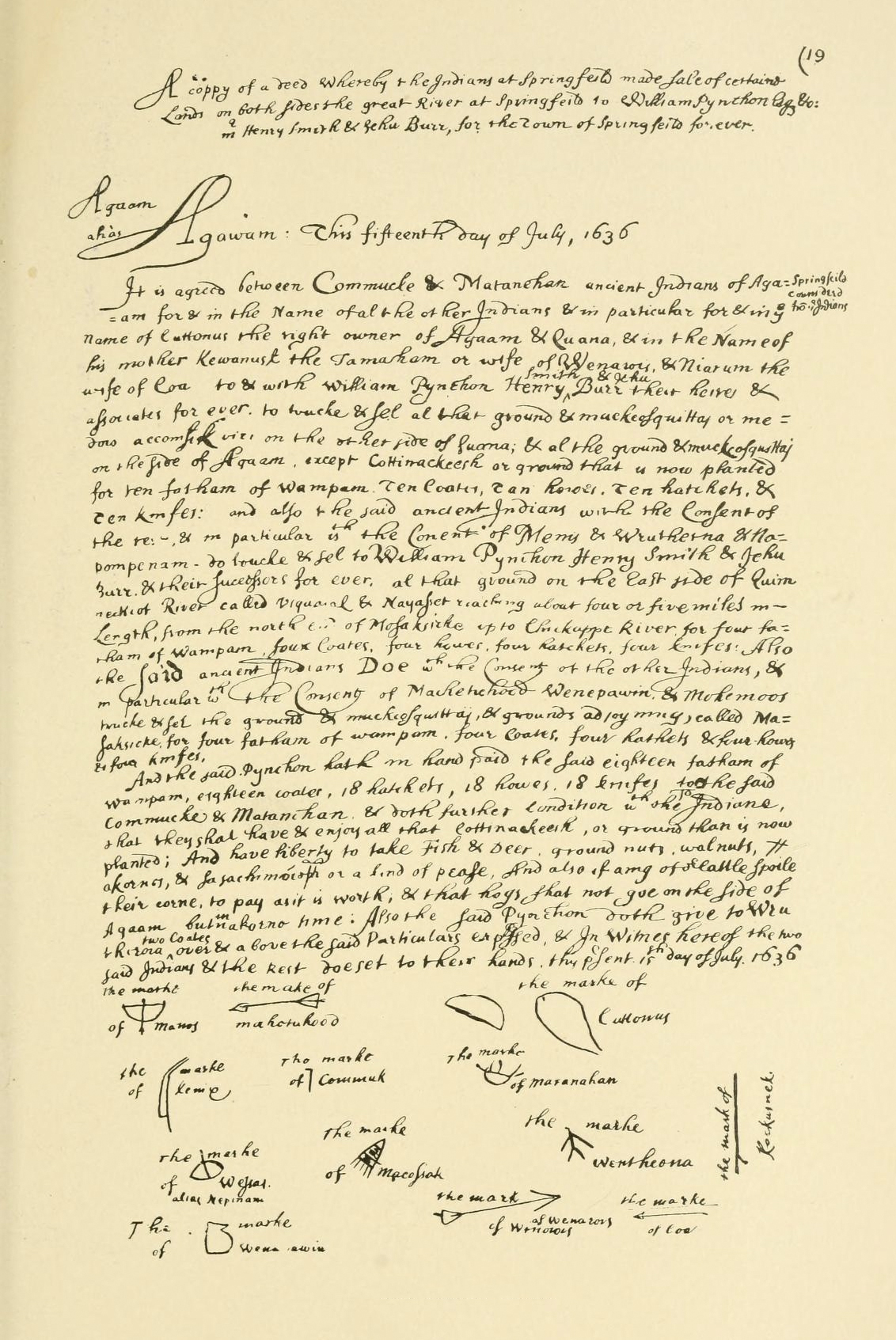
Facsimile of the 1636 deed between William Pynchon and 13 Pocomtuc tribesmen for the establishment of Springfield, previously Agawam Plantations, written in the hand of Elizur Holyoke, who served as the settlement's scribe

== Land issues ==
In 1647, Elizur was the second largest land owner in Springfield, at 125 acres (51 ha). William Pynchon had 237 acres (96 ha). After William Pynchon's problems with the General Court of Boston and his eventual retreat to England, William's son John Pynchon and Elizur Holyoke took control of Springfield, and in 1652 Elizur was appointed commissioner to govern the town of Springfield. (2)

In 1660, after the founding of Hadley and Northampton, a question arose regarding the exact borders of Springfield. The general court of Springfield sent out two surveying parties to explore the surrounding regions. Elizur Holyoke served as head of one of these parties, while Rowland Thomas headed the other party. While Holyoke traversed the east side of the Connecticut River, Thomas explored the west side of the river. Lore holds that the two held a conversation over a narrow part of the river near Hockanum.

=== Mount Holyoke ===
Holyoke and Thomas gave their names to the mountains that stood at the end of their paths. Mount Holyoke was named by Elizur Holyoke, while Rowland Thomas named Mount Tom, originally called Mount Thomas.

== Career ==
In 1661, Elizur was chosen as Springfield's deputy to the General Court; 1662, he was appointed associate county judge - recorder of all courts; 1663, made the rank of captain, and was a selectman and deputy to the general court; in 1675, the Holyoke home was destroyed during a raid by Indians led by Wequogan.

During the King Philip's War, Capt. Elizur Holyoke was in command of the successful defense of Springfield, until his death in 1676, one account says not due directly to any injury. However, there are other accounts that say he was killed by the Wampanoag Indians on February 5, 1676.

== Trivia ==
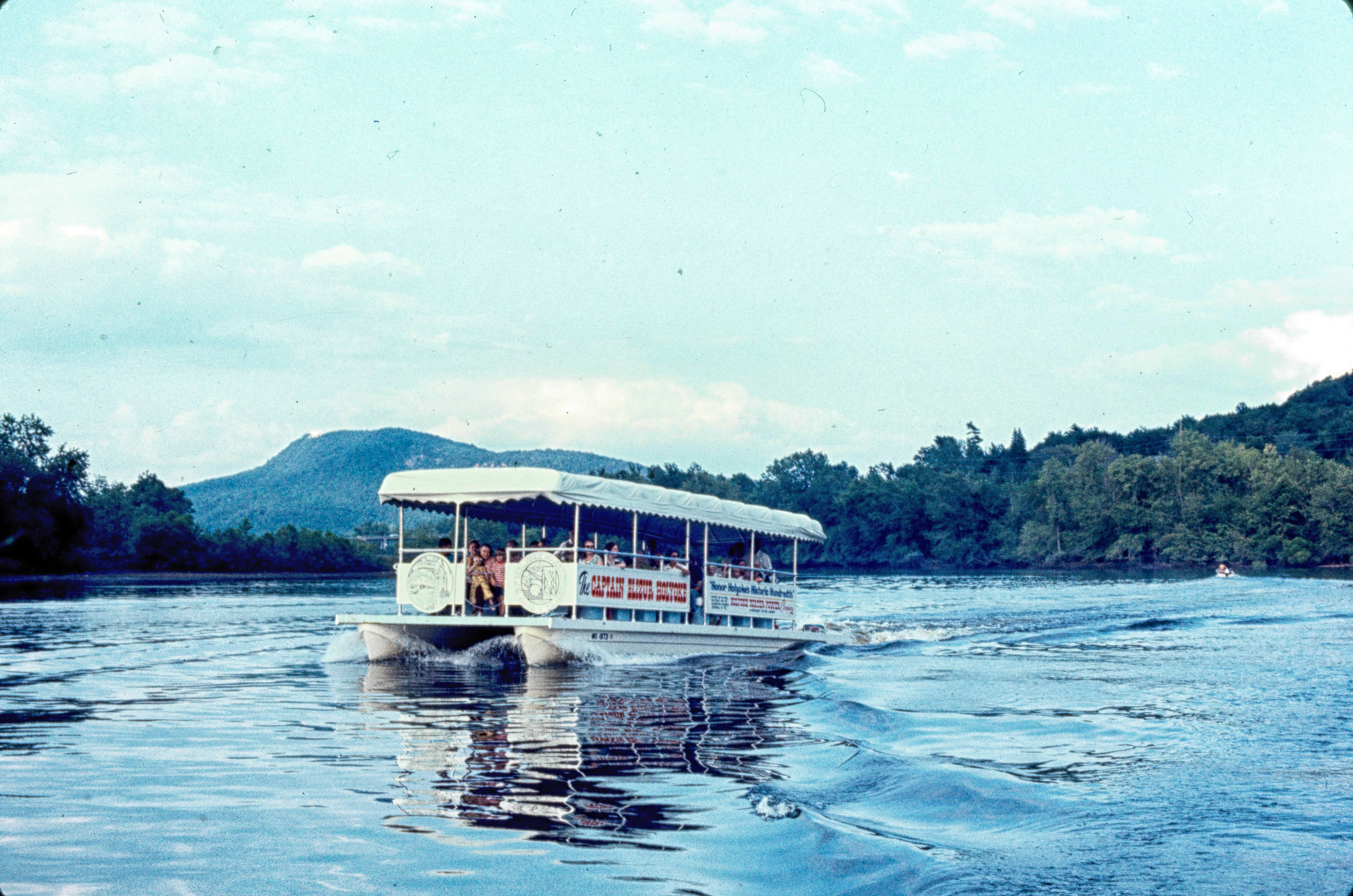
The Captain Elizur Holyoke, a pontoon used for site-seeing on the Connecticut River during the City of Holyoke's Centennial

- Contrary to some records, both the city of Holyoke and Mount Holyoke Female Seminary (now Mount Holyoke College) were named after the nearby mountain, Mount Holyoke, and not directly after Elizur Holyoke. The city's name was decided by the board of directors of the first Hadley Falls Company in a meeting in Boston on February 19, 1850.
- Elizur Holyoke's grandson Rev. Edward Holyoke was president of Harvard University from 1737 to 1769.
- Elizur is the uncle of Thomas Putnam and the great-uncle of Ann Putnam, Jr. of the Salem witch trials
