= Mount Tom (Washington) =

Mountain in Washington (state), United States

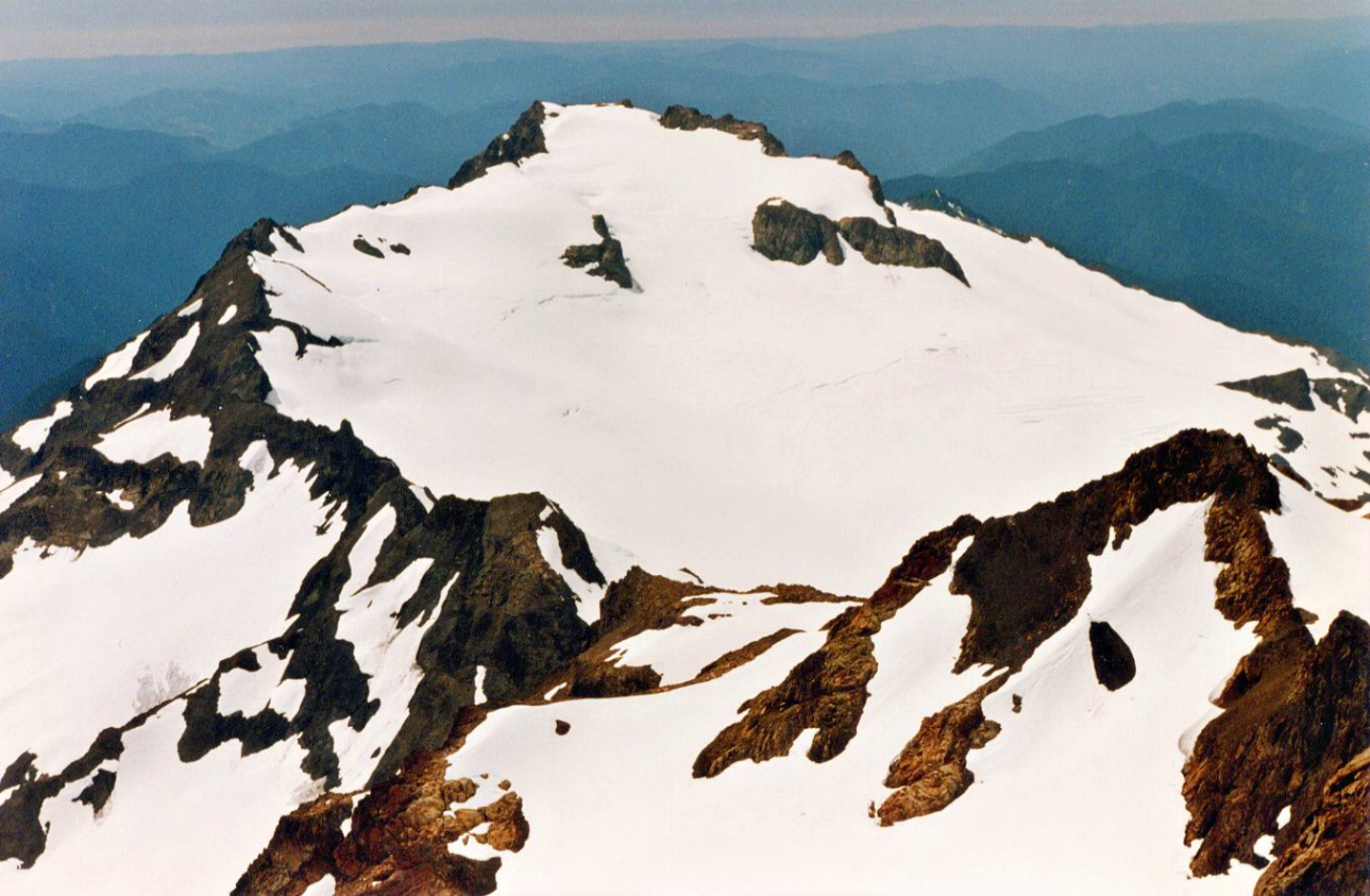
- Mount Tom seen from Mount Olympus

Highest point
- Elevation: 7,076 ft (2,157 m)
- Prominence: 716 ft (218 m)
- Parent peak: Mount Olympus (7,980 ft)
- Isolation: 2.27 mi (3.65 km)
- Coordinates: 47°47′35″N 123°45′29″W

Geography
- Location within Washington (state) Location within the United States
- Country: United States
- State: Washington
- County: Jefferson
- Protected area: Olympic National Park
- Parent range: Olympic Mountains
- Topo map: USGS Mount Tom

Geology
- Rock age: Eocene

Climbing
- First ascent: 1914 Edmond S. Meany, Boy Scouts
- Easiest route: Glacier + class 3 scrambling

Mount Tom is a remote 7,076-foot (2,157-metre) mountain summit located within Olympic National Park in Jefferson County of Washington state. The nearest higher neighbor is Mount Olympus, 1.76 mi (2.83 km) to the east. Due to heavy winter snowfalls, Mount Tom supports the massive White Glacier on its northeast slope, despite its modest elevation. This glacier is the westernmost glacier in the contiguous states, and the summit is the westernmost peak higher than 7000+ feet elevation. Precipitation runoff from the mountain drains into tributaries of the Hoh River.

== History ==
The mountain was originally named Mount Reid in 1890 by the Seattle Press Expedition for Whitelaw Reid, editor and proprietor of the New-York Tribune.

The history of the mountain's present name has two competing stories. One has it named for Thomas M. Hammond, Jr., a surveyor active in the west end of the Olympic Peninsula from 1895 to 1904. The second version has it named after boy scout Thomas Martin, a member of the 1914 first ascent climbing party led by Edmond S. Meany. Meany, who was then the Commissioner of Scouting in Seattle, promised the party of scouts that the first to reach the summit would have it named for him, and the 13-year-old bested his companions. Tom Martin would later become Washington State Treasurer, and a candidate for governor in 1952.

== Climate ==
Based on the Köppen climate classification, Mount Tom is located in the marine west coast climate zone of western North America. Weather fronts originating in the Pacific Ocean travel northeast toward the Olympic Mountains. As fronts approach, they are forced upward by the peaks (orographic lift), causing them to drop their moisture in the form of rain or snow. As a result, the Olympics experience high precipitation, especially during the winter months in the form of snowfall. Because of maritime influence, snow tends to be wet and heavy, resulting in avalanche danger. During winter months weather is usually cloudy, but due to high pressure systems over the Pacific Ocean that intensify during summer months, there is often little or no cloud cover during the summer. The months July through September offer the most favorable weather for viewing or climbing this peak.

== Geology ==
The Olympic Mountains are composed of obducted clastic wedge material and oceanic crust, primarily Eocene sandstone, turbidite, and basaltic oceanic crust. The mountains were sculpted during the Pleistocene era by erosion and glaciers advancing and retreating multiple times.

== Gallery ==
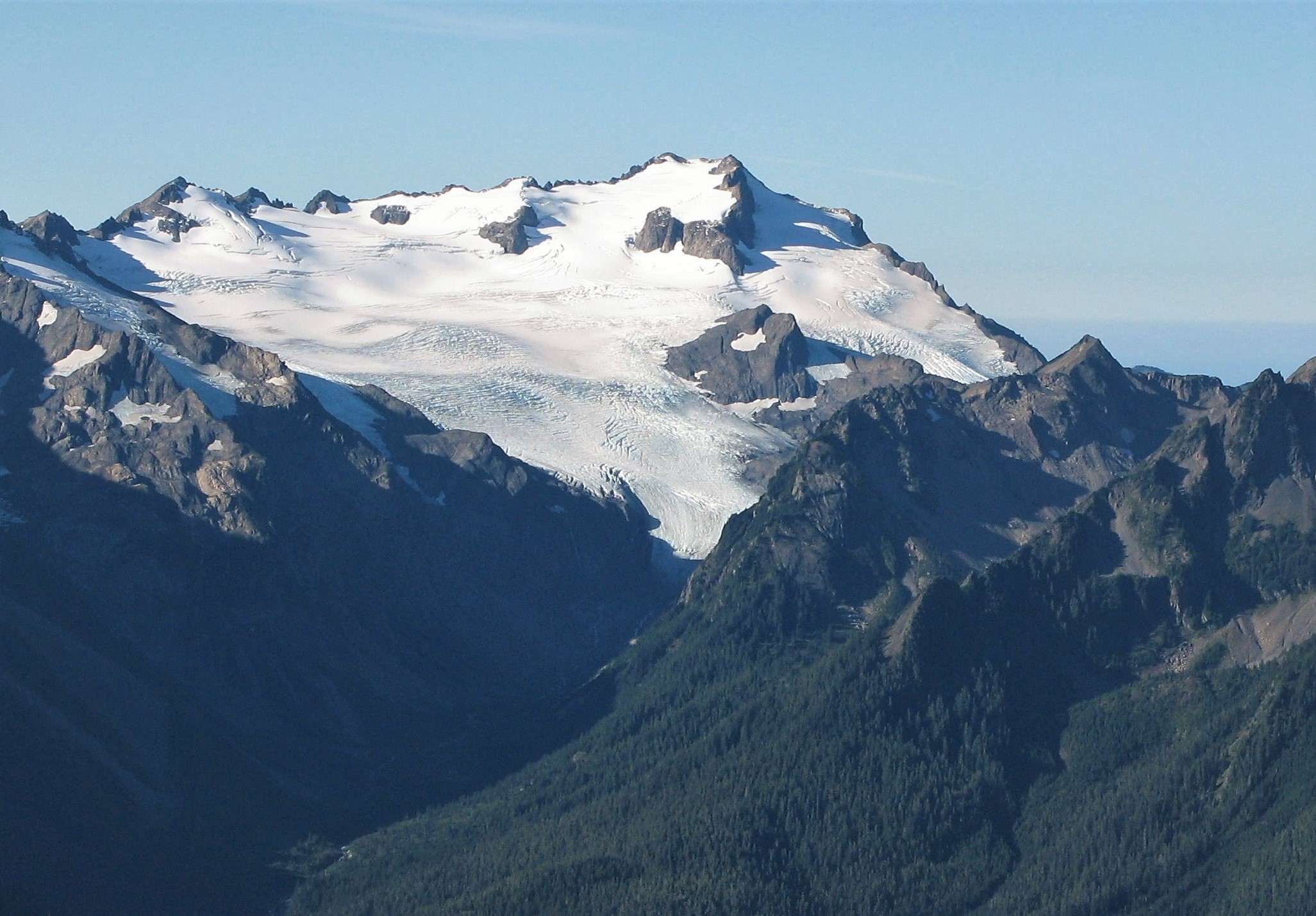
Mt. Tom from Mt. Carrie

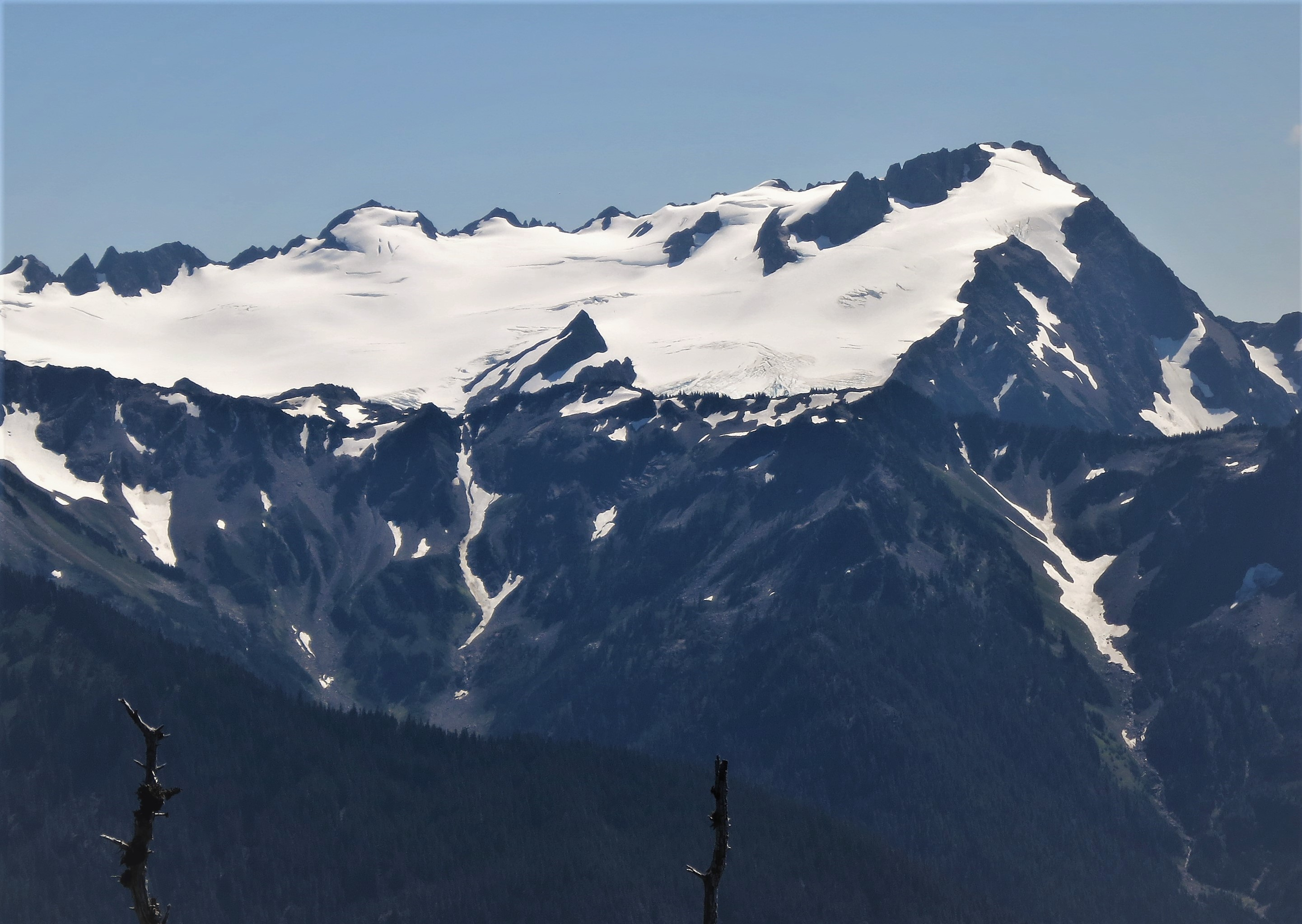
Mt. Tom from the north

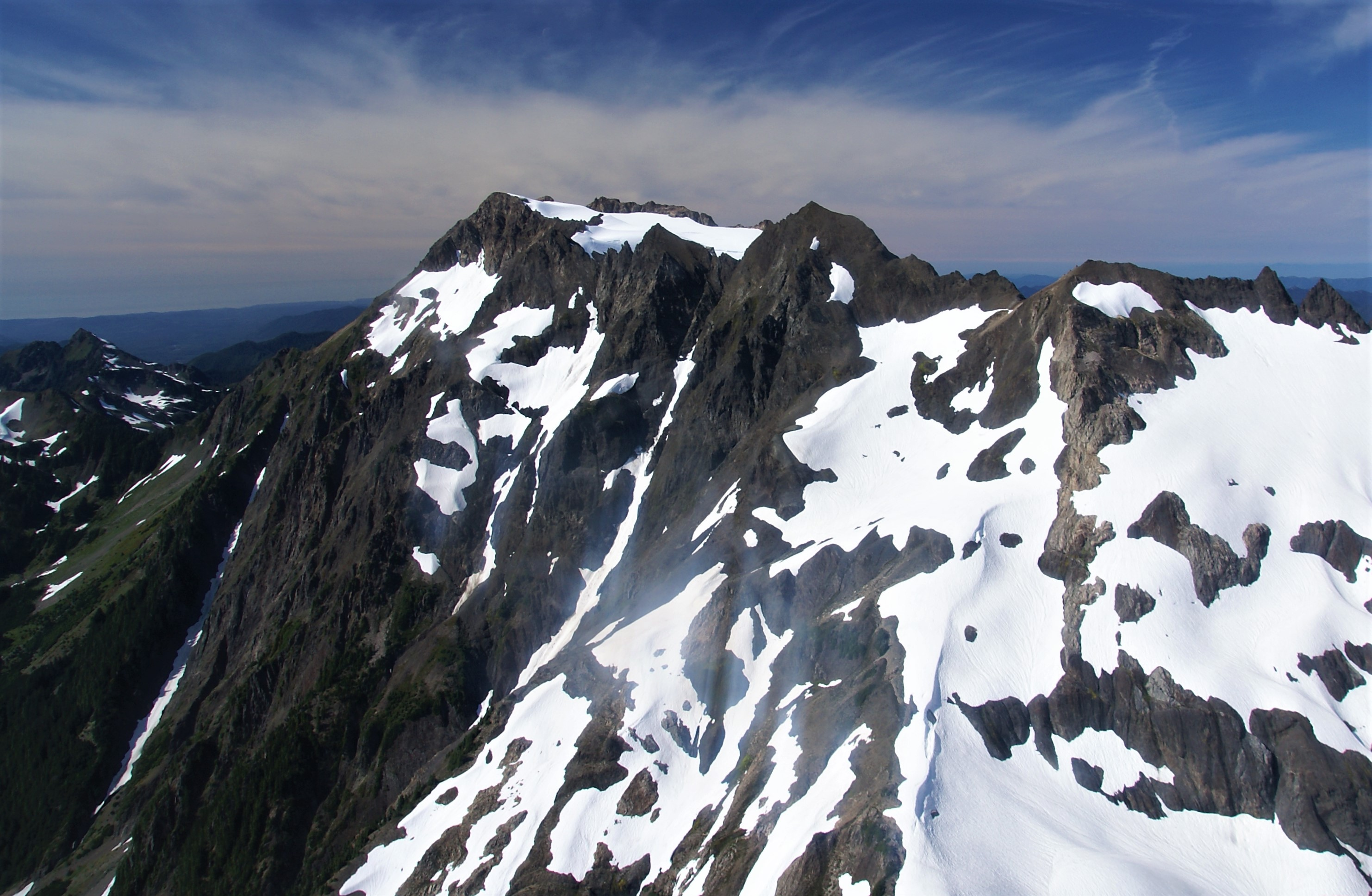
Aerial view from ESE

== See also ==
- Geology of the Pacific Northwest
- Geography of Washington (state)
