= Mount Tom (Vermont) =

Peak in Woodstock, Vermont, U.S.

Coordinates: 43°38′N 72°32′W

Mount Tom is a small peak, standing at 1357 feet, located in the town of Woodstock, Vermont. It is a part of the Marsh-Billings-Rockefeller National Historical Park. The peak has a multitude of hiking, running, and Nordic skiing trails, and has many sites dedicated to the national park. Standing in the middle of Woodstock, Vermont, the peak also is host to many annual town events, including the Road to the Pogue Race. Visible from the top are sights such as the village of Woodstock, the sister peak of Mount Tom (Mount Peg), the Ottauquechee River, U.S. Route 4, and many neighboring mountains.

== Location ==
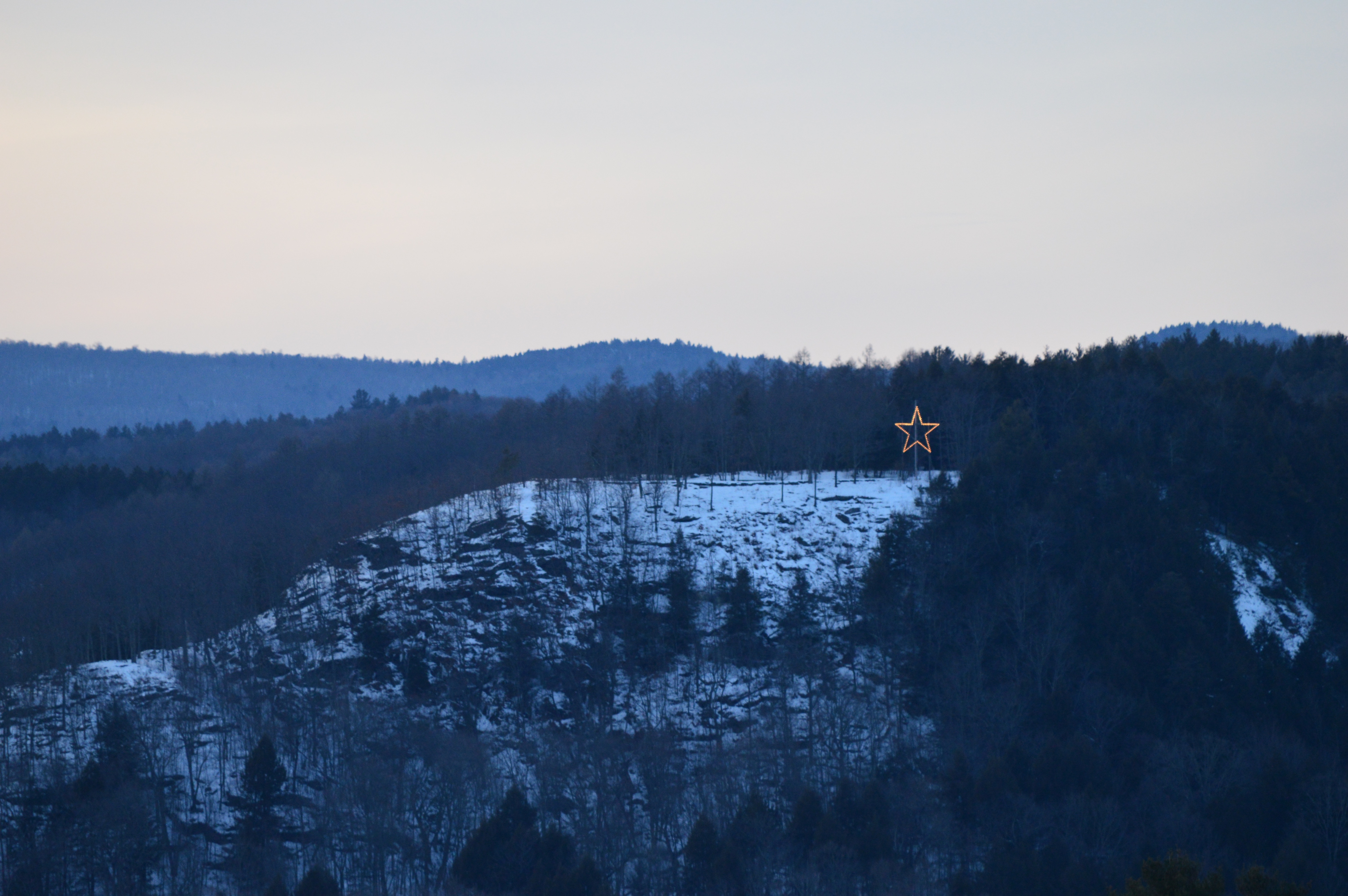

Mount Tom is located In the northeast of Woodstock, Vermont. It is near the bordering town of Pomfret, Vermont, and is flanked by Vermont Route 12 and Prosper Road. U.S. Route 4, the largest east–west route in the state, is 1.3 miles south west of the main entrance to the mountain, the Faulkner Trail.

== Trails ==
Mount Tom has four main entrances to trails intertwining along the whole mountain. The Faulkner Trail entrance is off Mountain Avenue and the local Faulkner Park. This trail is a direct route from the base of Mount Tom to the summit. Another entrance lies off Prosper Road. This trail leads directly to the Pogue, a 14-acre manmade pond created by a dam. The main entrance to the mountain lies within the Marsh-Billings-Rockefeller National Historic Park. This entrance leads to a circuit of trails that go to the summit, the Pogue, and through the forest of the mountain.

All of the trails are open year-round, but the most active months are May to October. The trails are popular sites for local day hikes in the summer months and Nordic skiing in the winter months. In the winter, trails are groomed and maintained to allow for locals and visitors to Nordic ski along the face of the mountain. Along many of the trails are remnants of historic farms from early Vermont farm owners, and sites that are kept and maintained by the National Park Service.

=== Faulkner Trail ===
The Faulkner Trail is a popular trail traveled on the mountain. It switchbacks up the southern facing side of the mountain all the way from the base to the peak. From the top is a panoramic view of the town of Woodstock, Vermont. The trail was built by Marianne Faulkner for her husband over 75 years ago. The purpose of the trail today is for scenic enjoyment, as well as connecting the Woodstock Trail System to the Marsh-Billings-Rockefeller National Historical Park.

The trail was recently repaired by local forces and the National Park Service. In 2004, the Billings Park Commission began to restore this trail. Most of the work was implemented by the Vermont Youth Conservation Corps (VYCC) crews. Together with restoration specialists, a majority of the repair work went into stonework, cleaning out and restoring culverts, and repairing the trail tread in Faulkner Park. Starting at the Faulkner Park, the trail is 3.75 miles in length.

== Wildlife ==
The face of the mountain has a very diverse wildlife. Because of the diversity in habitats, including wooded areas, open fields, and ponds, the wildlife ranges from amphibians to mammals to rare birds to reptiles alike. From aquatic to land animals, the flora and fauna are both diverse and are closely protected by the National Park Service.

=== Mammals ===
Mount Tom is home to many species typical to Vermont and New England. The most common mammals are eastern chipmunks, red and grey squirrels, woodchucks, and white tail deer. More nocturnal mammals are raccoons and skunks, while rarely seen are foxes, fisher cats, or black bears.

=== Birds ===
Many of the birds that live on Mount Tom are season songbirds common to Vermont. Both seasonal and year-round, it is mostly songbirds that live within the confines of the forest. An example of which is the Hermit thrush, state bird of Vermont. Very common on the mountain are various species of owl that hunt nocturnally. The species of owl are mainly the barred and barn owls. Near the Pogue, birds such as Great Blue herons feed.

=== Reptiles and Amphibians ===
Because Mount Tom has many different types of habitats, the aquatic environments, including both the Pogue and many streams, support the lives of reptiles and amphibians. Many common varieties of frogs, salamanders, and toads can be found in bodies of water and streams on the surface of Mount Tom. Also near the pond, reptiles such as snapping and painted turtles reside. Snakes are not common on the mountain, but common species such as garter, milk, and red belly can be spotted on the forest floor.

=== Plant Life ===
Mount Tom has on it many trees that are not native to the area. This is because Frederick H. Billings, the owner of the land before it was a park, took to planting various patches of trees from other parts of the world. These would include Norway spruce, red pine, European larch, and also trees that were more localized such as sugar maples, beeches, and birch trees. Some of these trees, being deciduous, are a pinnacle of Vermont for their bright foliage that peak every autumn. Trees such as pine, spruce, and larch, however, are evergreens, and keep their leaves year-round.

The mountain is also full of various types of Fern, the most abundant types being Polystichum acrostichoides (Christmas fern) and the Athyrium (lady fern).

== Local Events ==
Many local events take place on the mountain because of its central location and communal importance. Events include annual races, scientific explorations, and local events centered around celebrating community events and local food.

=== Road to the Pogue ===
The road to the Pogue is an annual 6.1 mile running race that takes place on the carriage trails of Mount Tom. The race is run every year by many members of the community of Woodstock. The course travels along the most scenic parts of the mountain and National Park with views to Mount Ascutney, a lap around the Pogue, and back down to the south peak of Mount Tom overlooking the village of Woodstock.

=== BioBlitz 2016 ===
BioBlitz was a citizen science event put on by the National Park Service and the Vermont Center for Ecostudies. The event was to inspire members of the local community to participate in a park wide species identification effort as part of a larger NPS wide initiative in 2016 for the NPS centennial celebration. It was a day dedicated to explore the mountain and learning about the organisms that live there. It included guided tours of the trails by park rangers for people to learn as much as they can. The purpose of the day is for members of the community to help identify species of plants and animals on Mount Tom and in the Marsh-Billings-Rockefeller National Historic Park. Contributions are added into the Vermont Atlas of Life.

=== Trek to Taste ===
Trek to Taste is an annual event in the town of Woodstock that celebrates local foods on the trails of Mount Tom and the National Park. Events that take place include guided walks around the trail system, farm fresh food samples along the trails, arts and crafts, trail games, quests and community health exhibits and Ice Cream Socials.

=== Peak-to-Peak-to-Pogue ===
Peak-to-Peak-to-Pogue is annual fall event hosted by the Marsh-Billings-Rockefeller National Historic Park with a variety of partners. The event focuses on inspiring visitors to hike the seven mile round trip that includes south Peak of Mt. Tom to North Peak and over to the Pogue, a 15-acre pond located on the National Park. Most years, the NPS has guided hikes, family activities, and a celebratory non-alcoholic cider for those that complete the hike.

== See also ==
- Woodstock, Vermont
- List of mountains in Vermont
