= Aries (mountain) =

Mountain in Washington (state), United States

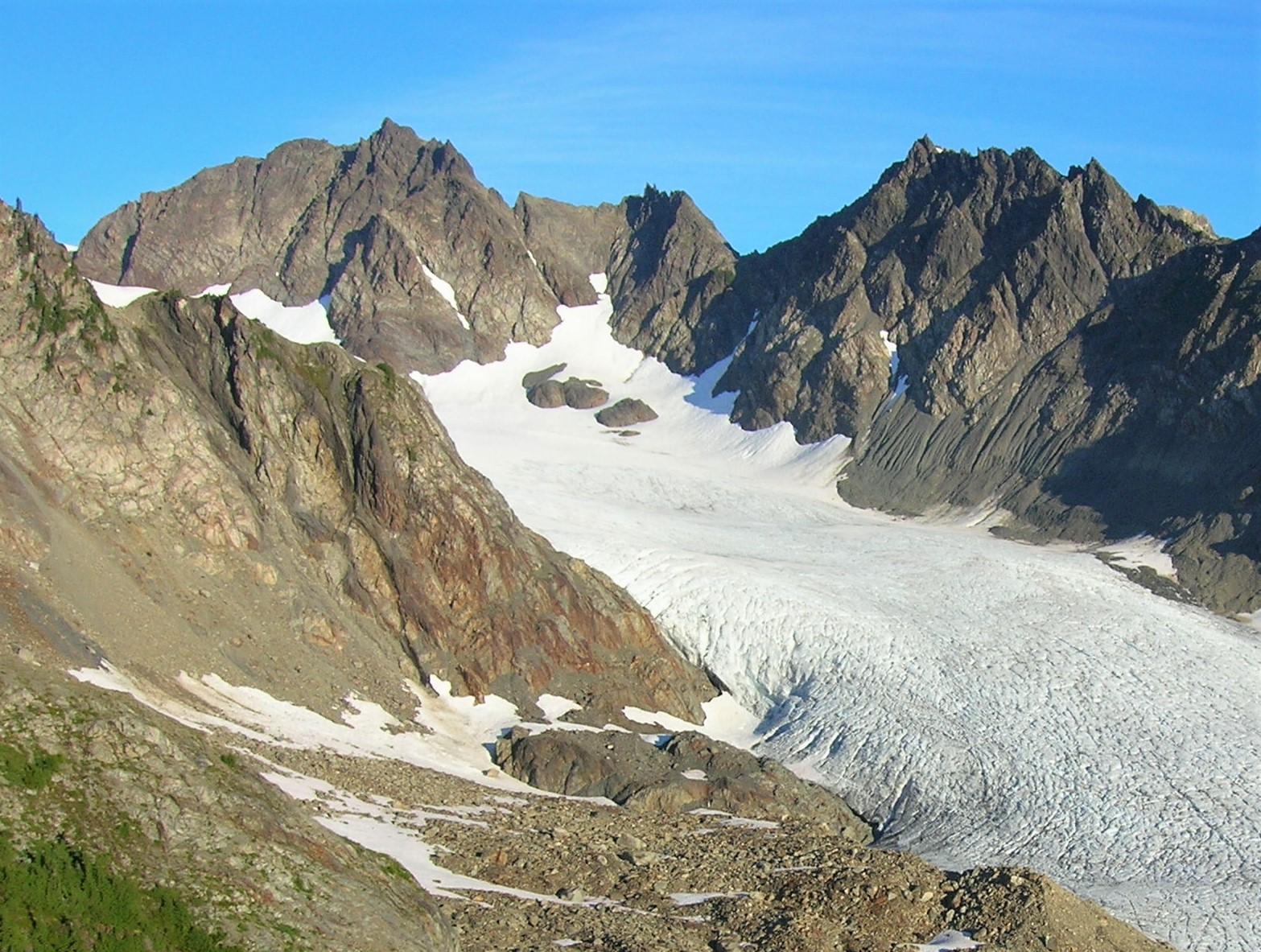
- Aries (upper left) and Humes Glacier, from ESE

Highest point
- Elevation: 6,533 ft (1,991 m)
- Prominence: 373 ft (114 m)
- Parent peak: Circe (6,847 ft)
- Isolation: 0.61 mi (0.98 km)
- Coordinates: 47°47′41″N 123°39′32″W

Geography
- Location within Washington (state) Location within the United States
- Country: United States
- State: Washington
- County: Jefferson
- Protected area: Olympic National Park
- Parent range: Olympic Mountains
- Topo map: USGS Mount Olympus

Geology
- Rock age: Eocene

Climbing
- Easiest route: class 3 scrambling via NW side

Aries is a 6,533-foot (1,991-metre) mountain summit located within Olympic National Park in Jefferson County of Washington state. Its neighbors include Mount Olympus, 2.46 mi (3.96 km) to the west, Athena 1.7 mi (2.7 km) to the southwest, and Mount Mathias 1.11 mi (1.79 km) to the northwest. Aries is wedged between the Hoh Glacier and the Humes Glacier, and immediately northeast of Blizzard Pass. Precipitation runoff from the mountain drains into headwaters of the Queets and Hoh Rivers. This mountain was named by glaciologists Richard Hubley and Edward LaChapelle in 1955, in preparation for the International Geophysical Year. It is named for Aries in keeping with the Greek and Roman mythology naming theme surrounding Mount Olympus.

== Climate ==
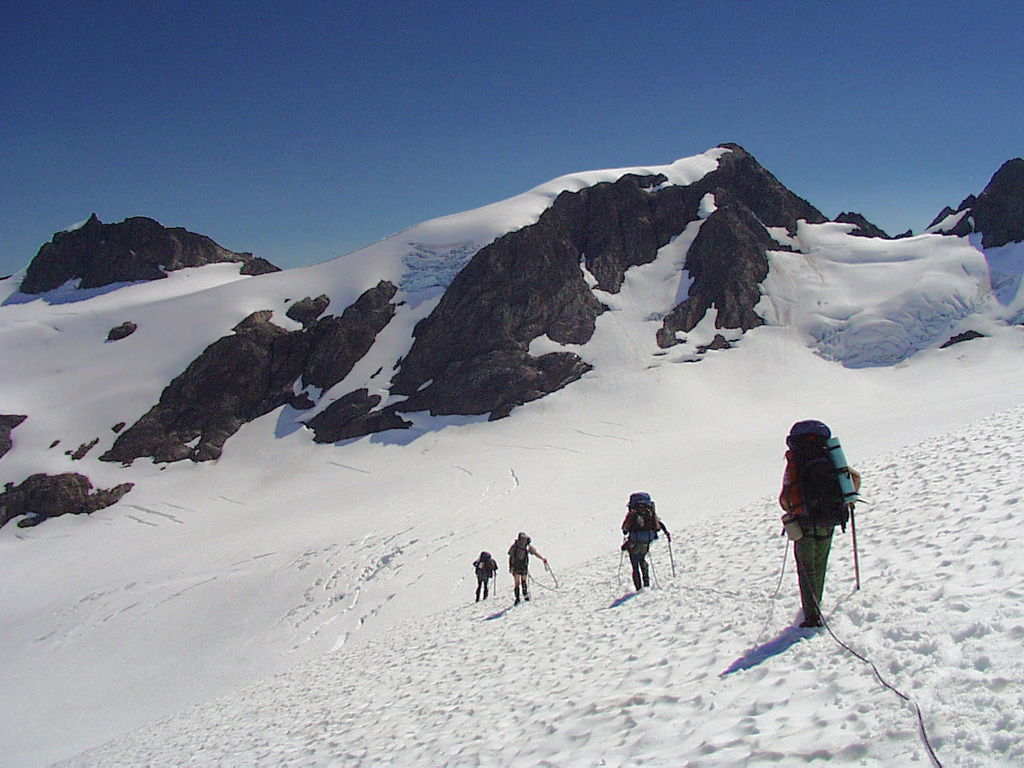
Aries (left) and Circe (right of center) seen from Hoh Glacier

Based on the Köppen climate classification, Aries is located in the marine west coast climate zone of western North America. Weather fronts originating in the Pacific Ocean travel northeast toward the Olympic Mountains. As fronts approach, they are forced upward by the peaks (orographic lift), causing them to drop their moisture in the form of rain or snow. As a result, the Olympics experience high precipitation, especially during the winter months in the form of snowfall. Because of maritime influence, snow tends to be wet and heavy, resulting in high avalanche danger. During winter months weather is usually cloudy, but due to high pressure systems over the Pacific Ocean that intensify during summer months, there is often little or no cloud cover during the summer. The of months July through September offer the most favorable weather for viewing or climbing this peak.

== Geology ==
The Olympic Mountains are composed of obducted clastic wedge material and oceanic crust, primarily Eocene sandstone, turbidite, and basaltic oceanic crust. The mountains were sculpted during the Pleistocene era by erosion and glaciers advancing and retreating multiple times.

== See also ==
- Olympic Mountains
- Geology of the Pacific Northwest
