= Mount Bretherton =

Mountain in Washington (state), United States

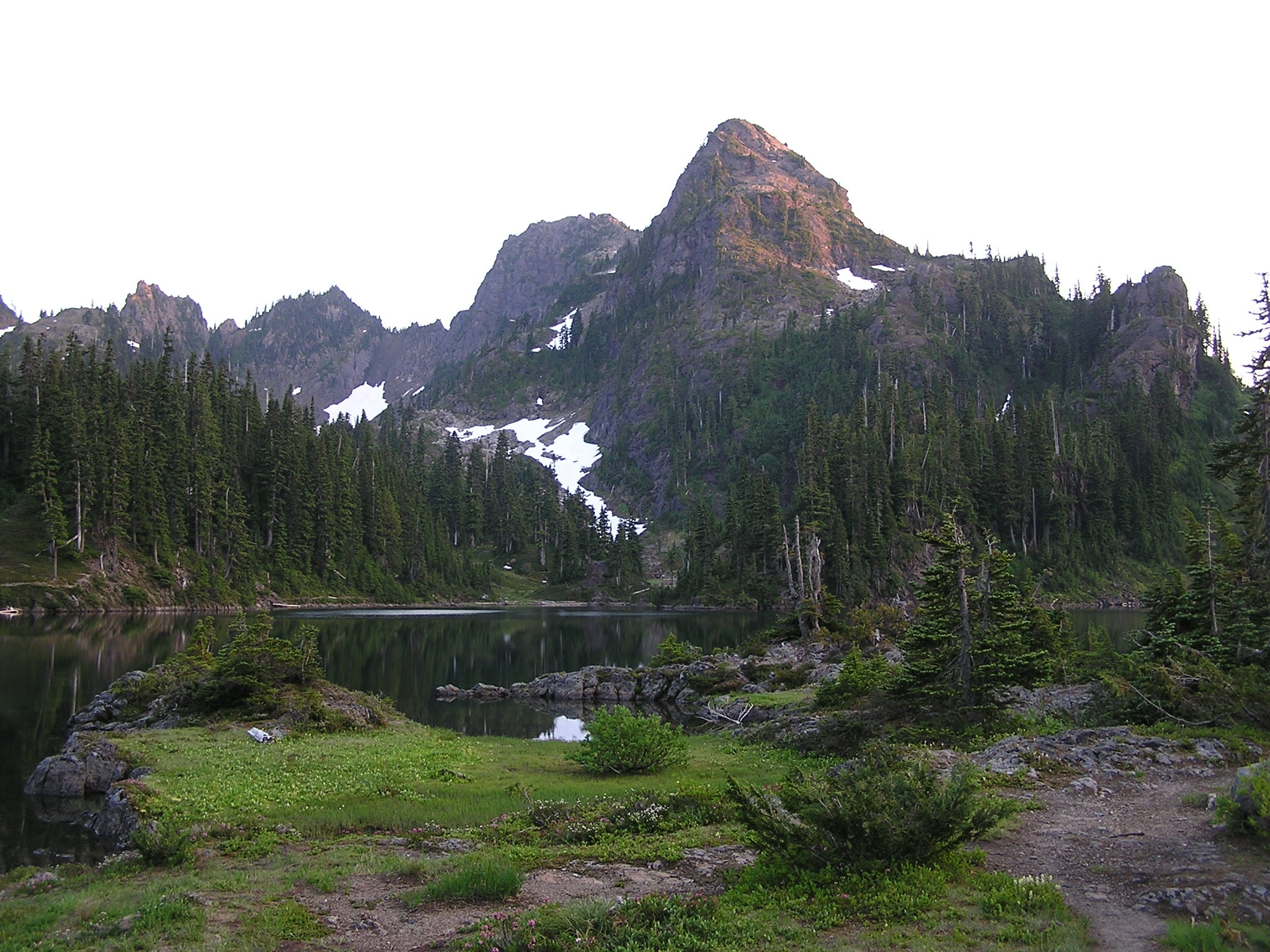
- Mt. Bretherton, north aspect

Highest point
- Elevation: 5,960 ft (1,817 m)
- Prominence: 1,240 ft (378 m)
- Parent peak: Mount Lena (5,995 ft)
- Isolation: 1.43 mi (2.30 km)
- Coordinates: 47°37′10″N 123°12′36″W

Geography
- Location within Washington (state) Location within the United States
- Country: United States
- State: Washington
- County: Jefferson
- Protected area: Olympic National Park
- Parent range: Olympic Mountains
- Topo map: USGS Mount Washington

Climbing
- First ascent: Unknown
- Easiest route: class 2 hiking

Mount Bretherton is a 5,960-foot-elevation (1,817-meter) mountain summit located in the Olympic Mountains, in Jefferson County of Washington state. It is situated within Olympic National Park, immediately south and 1,400 feet above the shore of Upper Lena Lake. Mount Lena lies across the lake to the north, Mount Stone is 2.8 miles to the west-southwest, and The Brothers approximately four miles to the northeast. Precipitation runoff from the mountain drains south to the Hamma Hamma River via Boulder, Delta, and Lena Creeks. Topographic relief is significant as it rises over 5,100 feet (1,600 meters) above the river in two miles. The non-technical ascent of Mount Bretherton involves hiking eight miles (one-way) and 5,300 feet elevation gain via the Upper Lena Lake Trail and cross-country above the lake, with most favorable conditions from July through September. There are pleasant campsites at the lake, and the ascent to the summit takes two hours from the lake. This mountain's name has been officially adopted by the United States Board on Geographic Names.

== Etymology ==
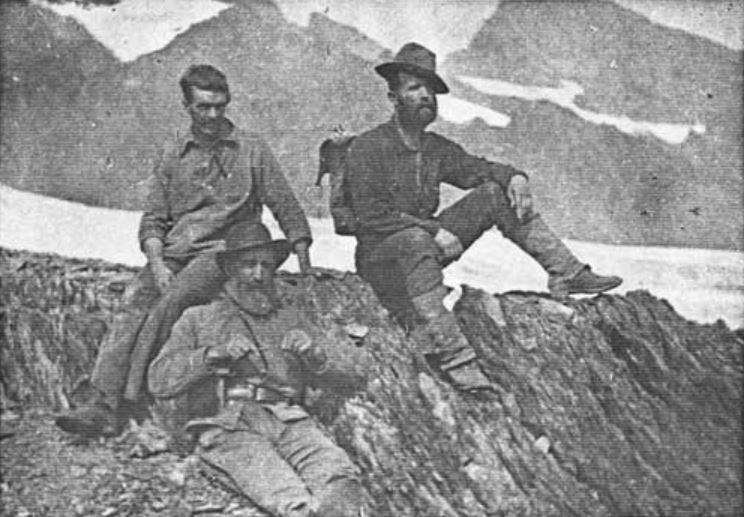
B. J. Bretherton (left) climbing Mt. Olympus in 1890

The mountain was named in 1890 for Bernard Joseph Bretherton, a naturalist who was a member of the Olympic Mountains Exploring Expedition of 1890 led by Lieutenant Joseph P. O'Neil which crossed the range from east to west. He was born in England, emigrated to the United States in 1885, where he lived in Portland, Oregon, and was the curator of the Oregon Alpine Club, of which O'Neil was club secretary. Bretherton was one of three members of the O'Neil expedition who reportedly made the first ascent of Mount Olympus on September 22, although it is now believed they probably climbed a subsidiary peak named Athena.

== Climate ==
Based on the Köppen climate classification, Mount Bretherton is located in the marine west coast climate zone of western North America. Weather fronts originating in the Pacific Ocean travel northeast toward the Olympic Mountains. As fronts approach, they are forced upward by the peaks (orographic lift), causing them to drop their moisture in the form of rain or snow. As a result, the Olympics experience high precipitation, especially during the winter months in the form of snowfall. Because of maritime influence, snow tends to be wet and heavy, resulting in avalanche danger. During winter months weather is usually cloudy, but due to high pressure systems over the Pacific Ocean that intensify during summer months, there is often little or no cloud cover during the summer. The months June through September offer the most favorable weather for visiting.

== Geology ==
The Olympic Mountains are composed of obducted clastic wedge material and oceanic crust, primarily Eocene sandstone, turbidite, and basaltic oceanic crust. The mountains were sculpted during the Pleistocene era by erosion and glaciers advancing and retreating multiple times.

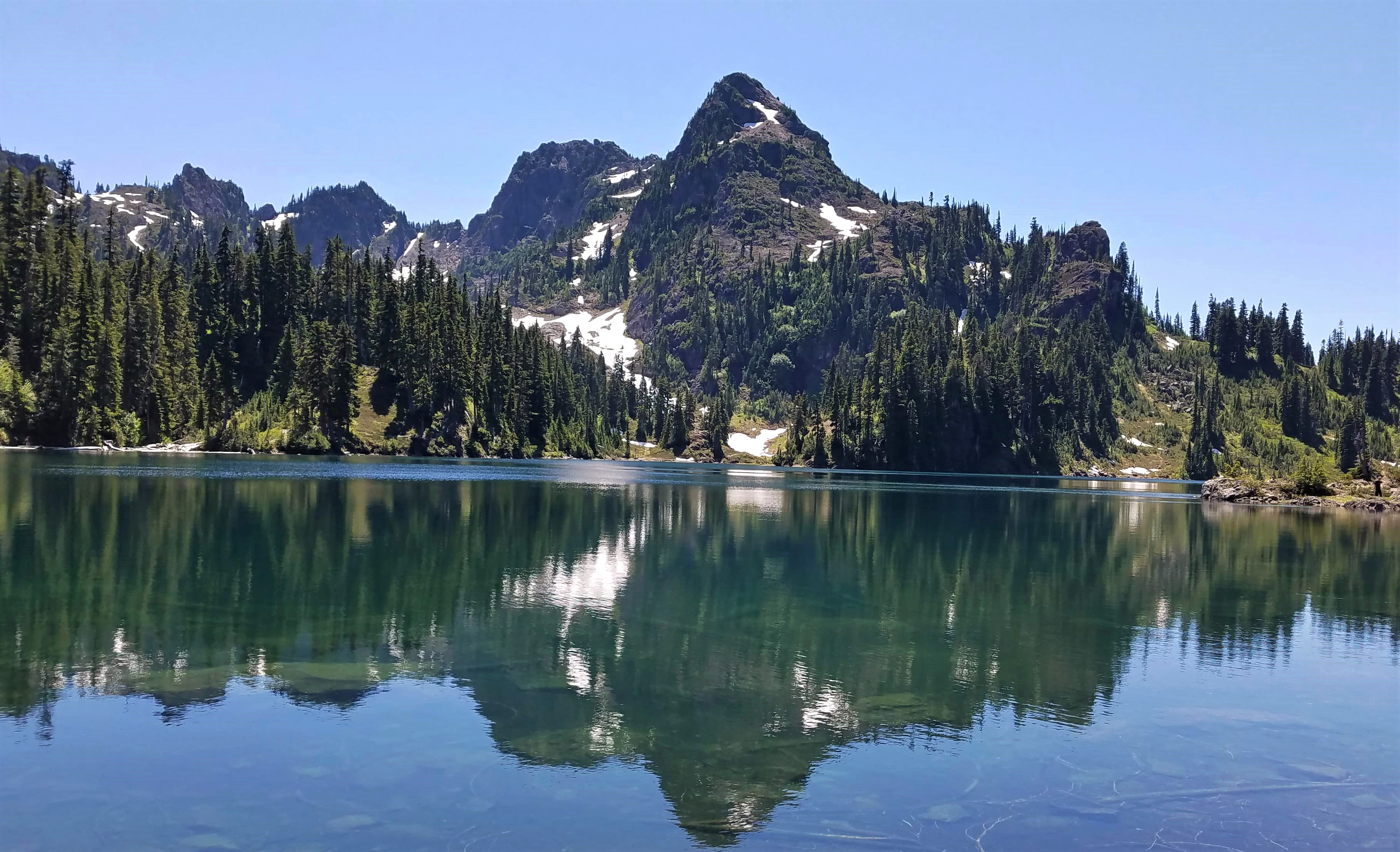
Mt. Bretherton reflected in Upper Lena Lake

== See also ==
- Geology of the Pacific Northwest
