= Mount Mathias =

Mountain in Washington (state), United States

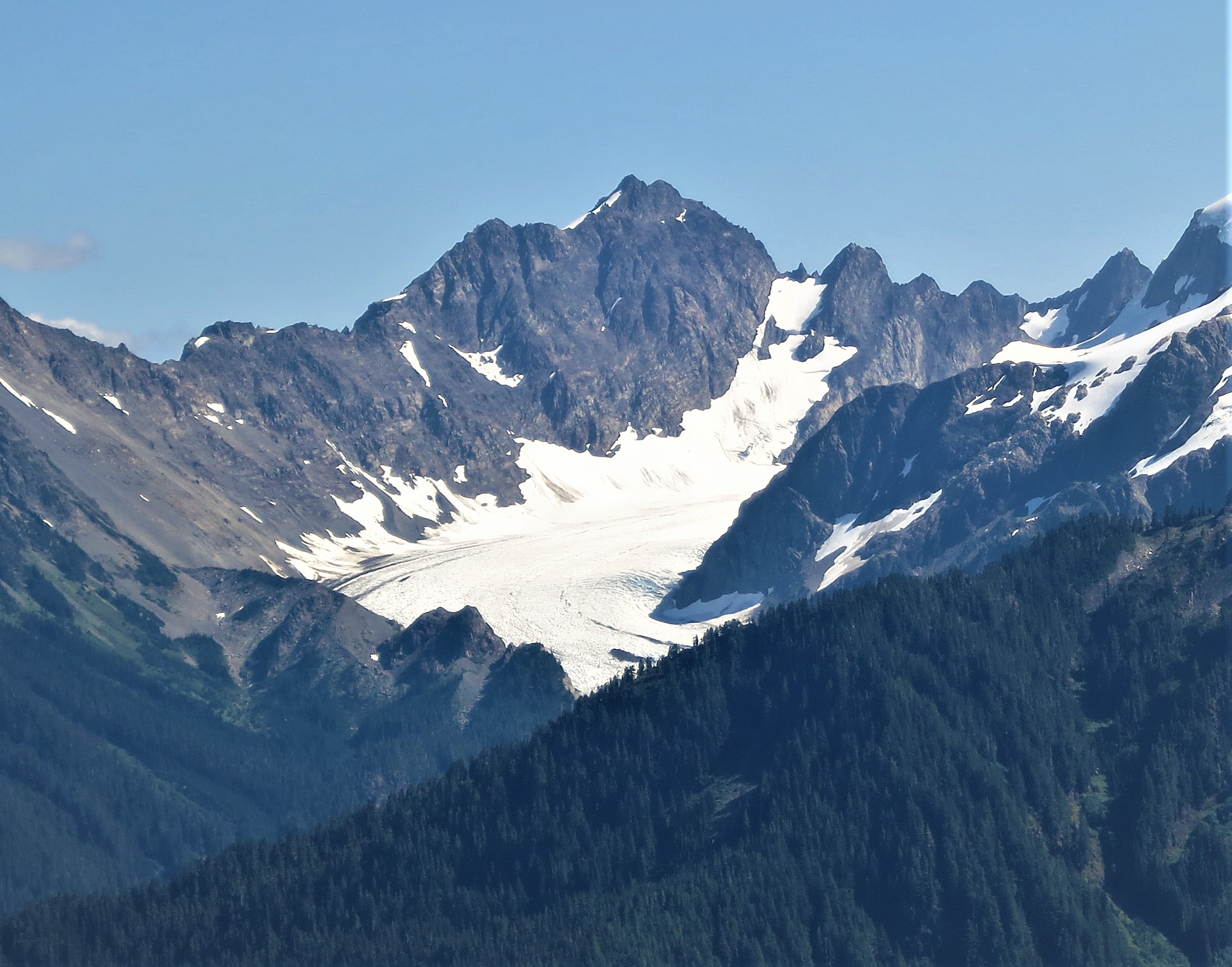
- Mt. Mathias, from NNW

Highest point
- Elevation: 7,156 ft (2,181 m)
- Prominence: 996 ft (304 m)
- Parent peak: Mount Olympus (7,980 ft)
- Isolation: 0.97 mi (1.56 km)
- Coordinates: 47°48′18″N 123°40′37″W

Geography
- Location within Washington (state) Location within the United States
- Country: United States
- State: Washington
- County: Jefferson
- Protected area: Olympic National Park
- Parent range: Olympic Mountains
- Topo map: USGS Mount Olympus

Geology
- Rock age: Eocene

Climbing
- First ascent: 1957 by
- Easiest route: class 4 climbing via West Face

Mount Mathias is a 7,156-foot (2,181-metre) mountain summit located within Olympic National Park in Jefferson County of Washington state. Its nearest higher neighbor is Mount Olympus, 1.76 mi (2.83 km) to the east. Mount Mathias is wedged between the massive Blue Glacier below its west slope, and the Hoh Glacier on the east side. Precipitation runoff from the mountain drains into the Hoh River.

== History ==
This mountain was originally named "Apollo", for one of the Olympian deities in Greek and Roman mythology who made Mount Olympus home. It was renamed in honor of Francis Wayland "Matt" Mathias (1884–1959), a mountaineer, naturalist, and Grays Harbor County civic leader. The Mathias name was officially adopted in 1960 by the U.S. Board on Geographic Names.

The first ascent of this peak was made in 1957 by Yves Eriksson and Jim Hawkins.

== Climate ==
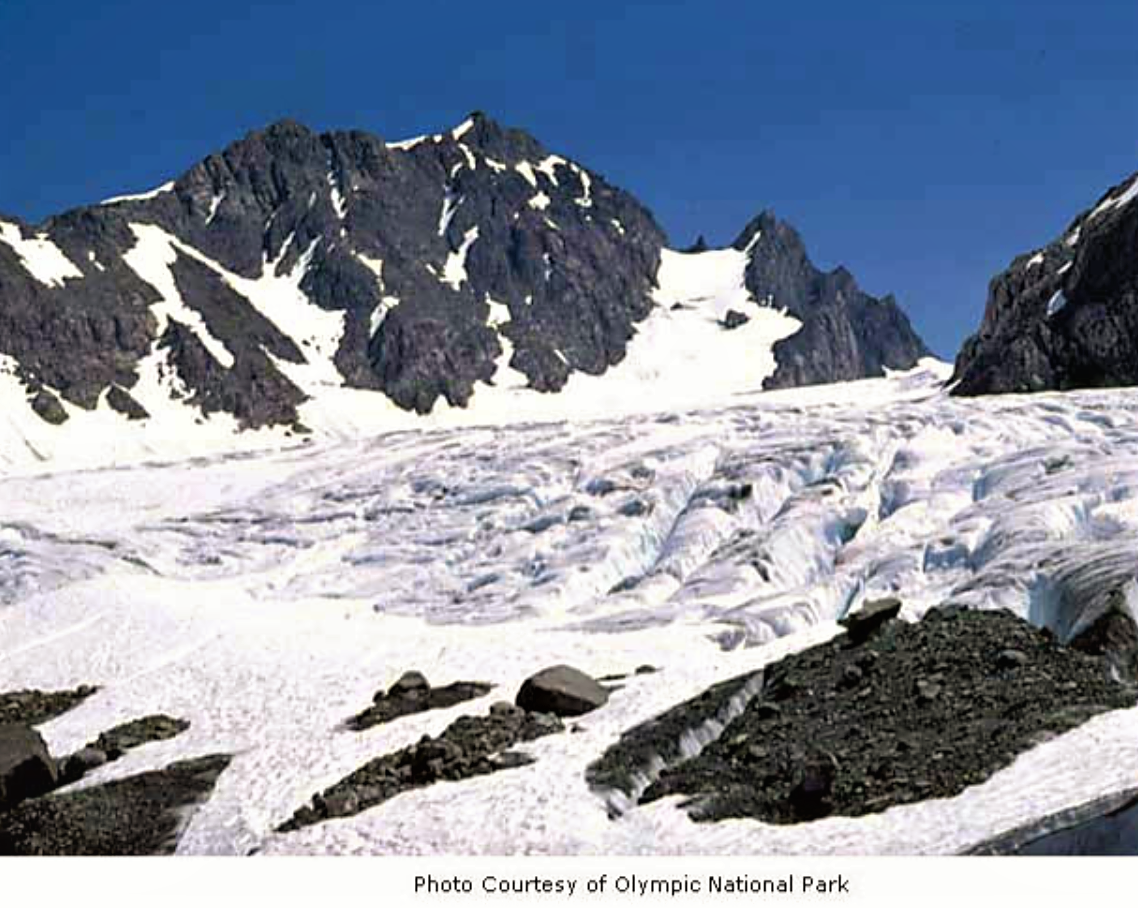
Blue Glacier and Mount Mathias

Based on the Köppen climate classification, Mount Mathias is located in the marine west coast climate zone of western North America. Weather fronts originating in the Pacific Ocean travel northeast toward the Olympic Mountains. As fronts approach, they are forced upward by the peaks (orographic lift), causing them to drop their moisture in the form of rain or snow. As a result, the Olympics experience high precipitation, especially during the winter months in the form of snowfall. Because of maritime influence, snow tends to be wet and heavy, resulting in avalanche danger. During winter months weather is usually cloudy, but due to high pressure systems over the Pacific Ocean that intensify during summer months, there is often little or no cloud cover during the summer. The months of July through September offer the most favorable weather for viewing or climbing this peak.

== Geology ==
The Olympic Mountains are composed of obducted clastic wedge material and oceanic crust, primarily Eocene sandstone, turbidite, and basaltic oceanic crust. The mountains were sculpted during the Pleistocene era by erosion and glaciers advancing and retreating multiple times.

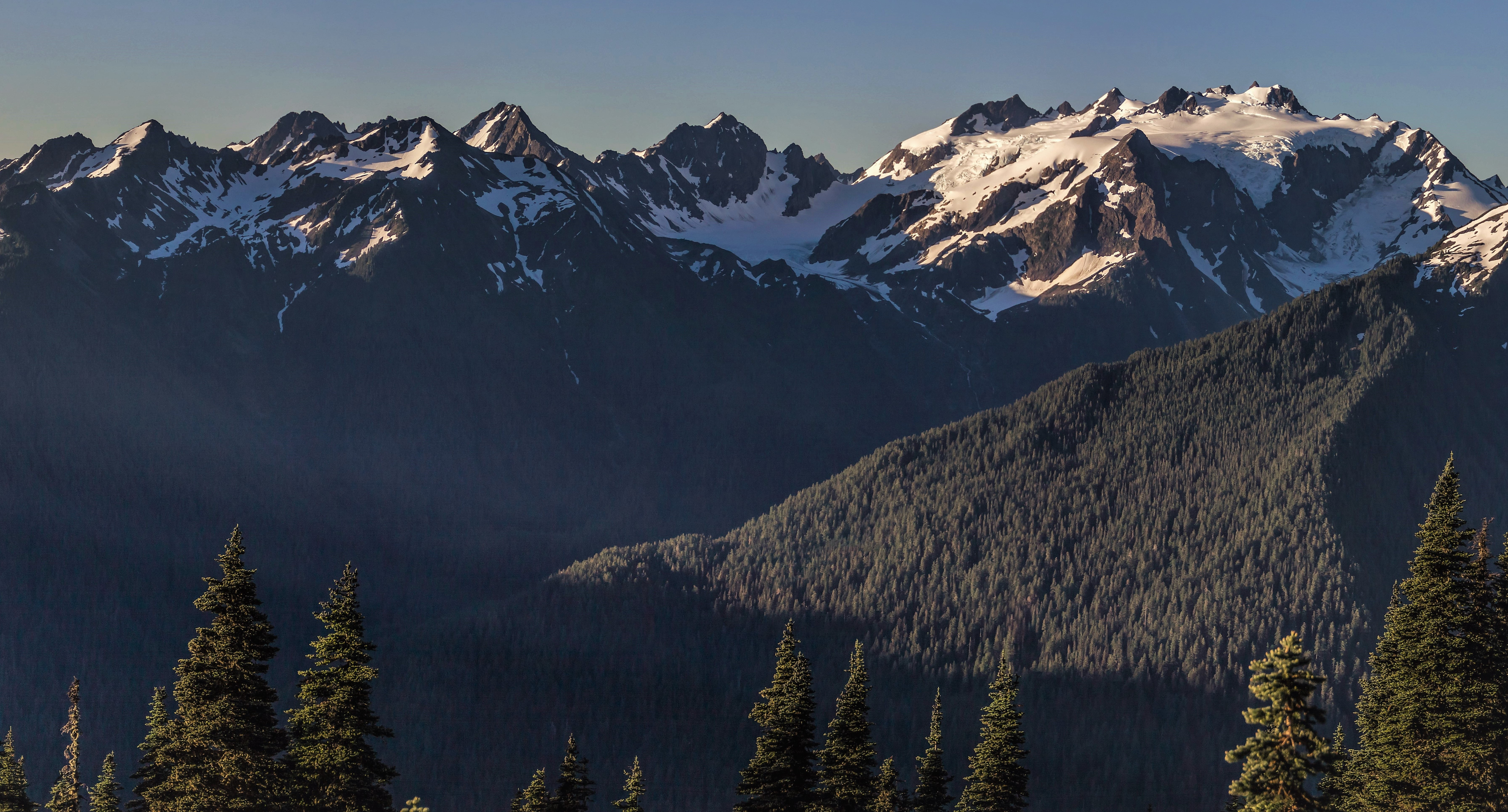
Mt.Mathias centered, Mt. Olympus to the right

== See also ==
- Geology of the Pacific Northwest
