= Athena (Olympic Mountains) =

Mountain in Washington (state), United States

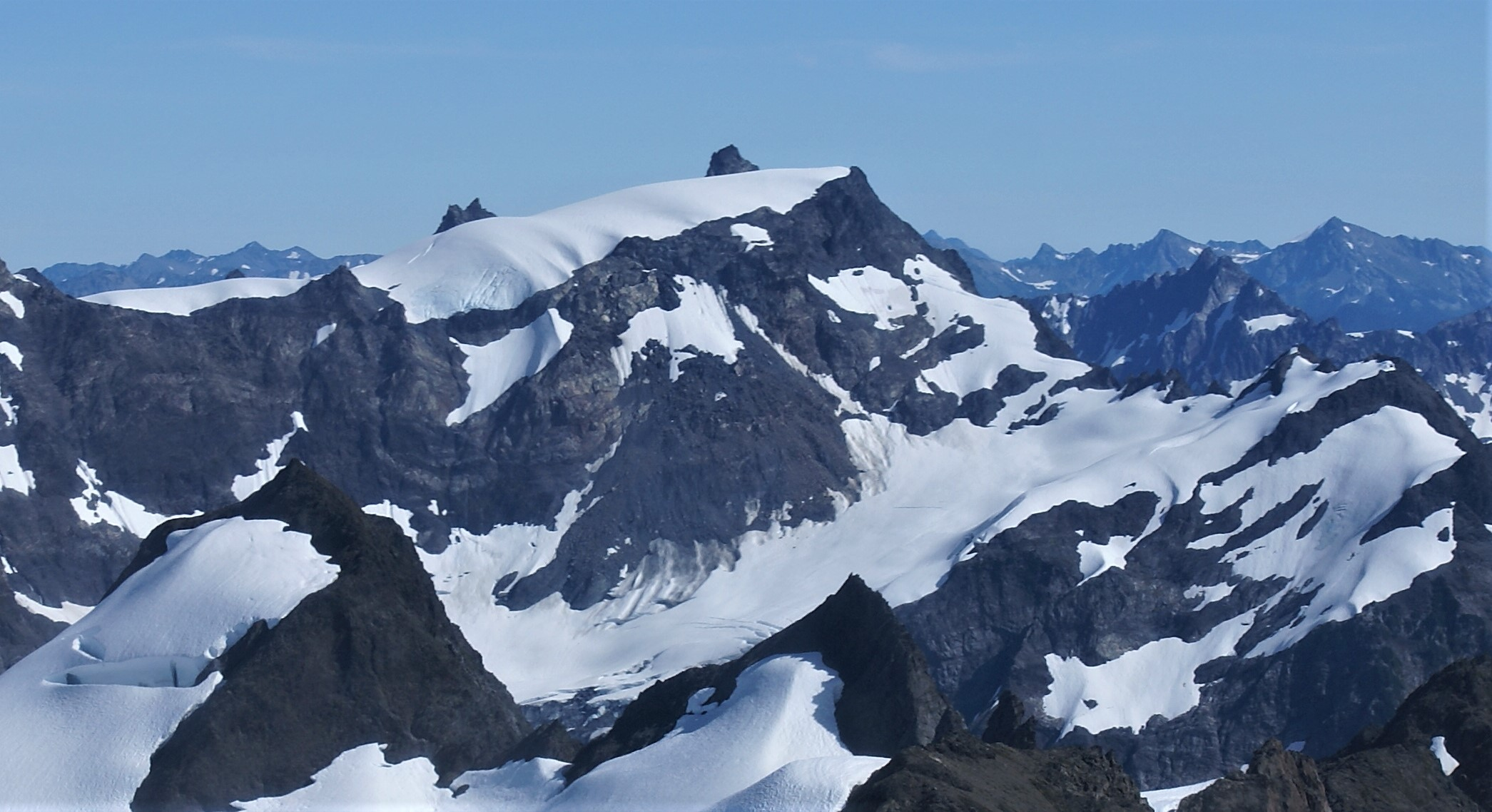
- West aspect

Highest point
- Elevation: 7,365 ft (2,245 m)
- Prominence: 525 ft (160 m)
- Parent peak: Mount Olympus
- Isolation: 1.08 mi (1.74 km)
- Coordinates: 47°46′53″N 123°41′23″W

Geography
- Location within Washington (state) Location within the United States
- Country: United States
- State: Washington
- County: Jefferson
- Protected area: Olympic National Park
- Parent range: Olympic Mountains
- Topo map: USGS Mount Olympus

Geology
- Rock age: Eocene

Climbing
- First ascent: 1938
- Easiest route: class 3 via Hoh Glacier

Athena is a 7,365-foot-elevation (2,245-meter) mountain summit located within Olympic National Park in Jefferson County of Washington state. Athena is situated at the head of the Hoh Glacier, and the Hubert Glacier lies below the west aspect. Its neighbors include Mount Olympus, 1.7 mi (2.7 km) to the northwest, and Aries 1.7 mi (2.7 km) to the northeast. Athena has subpeaks "Athena II" (7,259 ft), and "Athena's Owl" (7,000 ft). Precipitation runoff from the mountain drains into the Queets and Hoh Rivers, with Athena being the highest point within the Queets drainage basin.

== History ==
This peak was originally called Mount Reid by the 1889-90 Seattle Press Expedition, in honor of Whitelaw Reid of the New-York Tribune. Reid was one of the expedition's sponsors. It is named for the goddess Athena, in keeping with the Greek mythology naming theme of features surrounding Mount Olympus. The peak is also known as the South Peak of Mount Olympus. The first ascent of the summit was made in 1938 by Don Dooley, George Martin, Bob Peterson, and Bob Scott.

== Climate ==
Based on the Köppen climate classification, Athena is located in the marine west coast climate zone of western North America. Weather fronts originating in the Pacific Ocean travel northeast toward the Olympic Mountains. As fronts approach, they are forced upward by the peaks (orographic lift), causing them to drop their moisture in the form of rain or snow. As a result, the Olympics experience high precipitation, especially during the winter months in the form of snowfall. Because of maritime influence, snow tends to be wet and heavy, resulting in high avalanche danger. During winter months weather is usually cloudy, but due to high pressure systems over the Pacific Ocean that intensify during summer months, there is often little or no cloud cover during the summer. The months of July through September offer the most favorable weather for viewing or climbing this peak.

== Geology ==
The Olympic Mountains are composed of obducted clastic wedge material and oceanic crust, primarily Eocene sandstone, turbidite, and basaltic oceanic crust. The mountains were sculpted during the Pleistocene era by erosion and glaciers advancing and retreating multiple times.

== Gallery ==
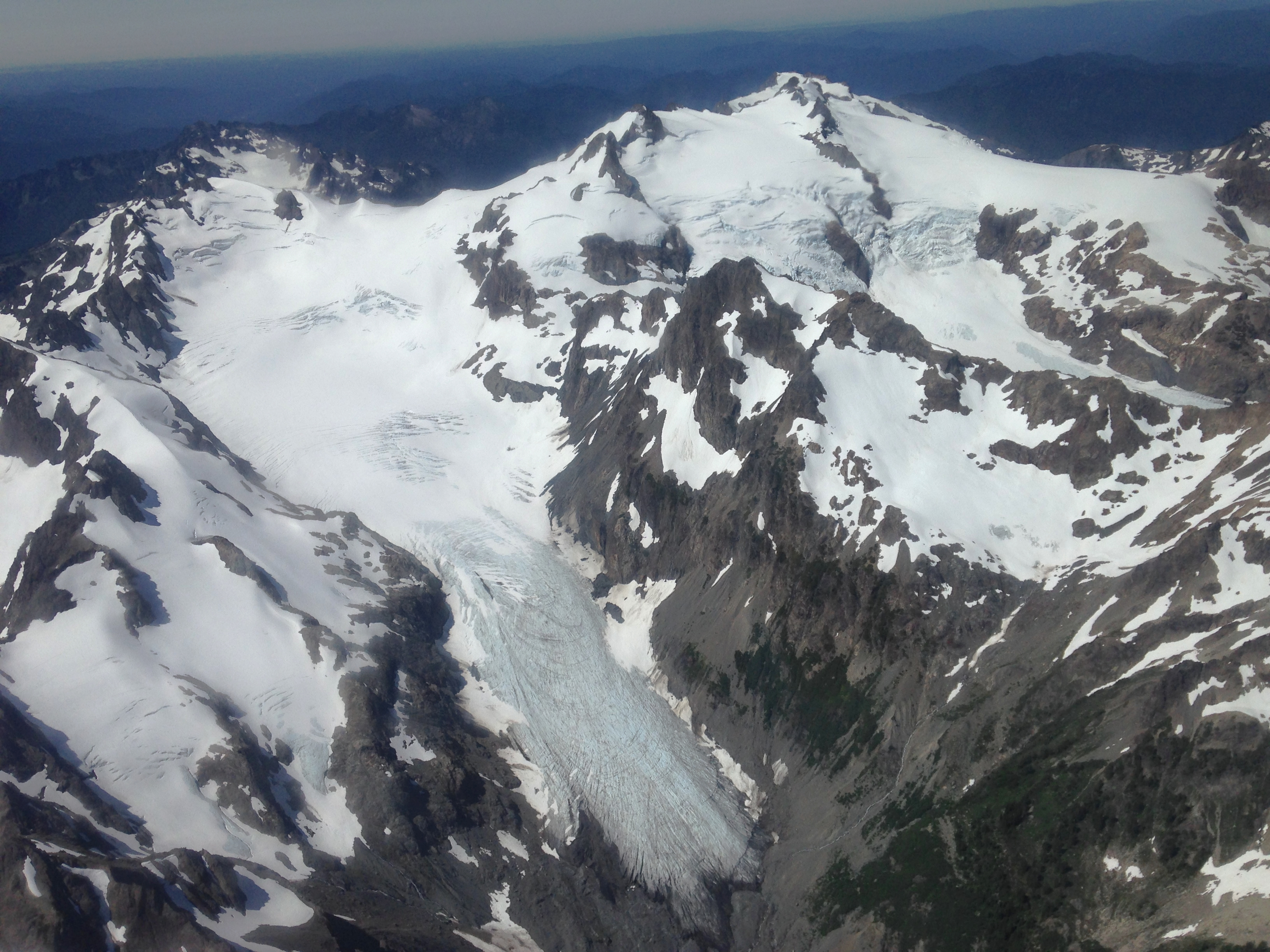
Aerial view of Athena in upper left at top of Hoh Glacier. Mt. Olympus to the right.

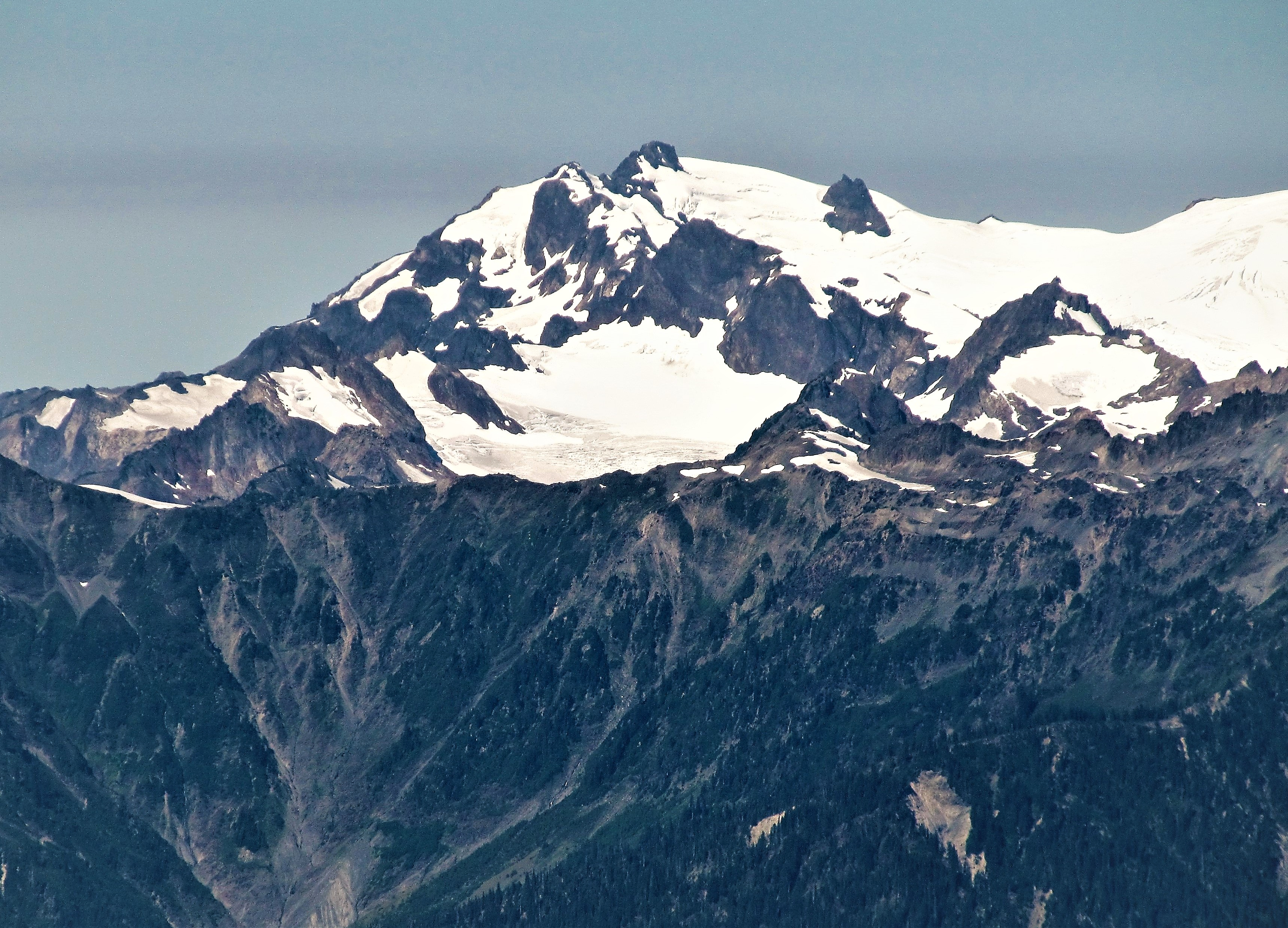
East aspect

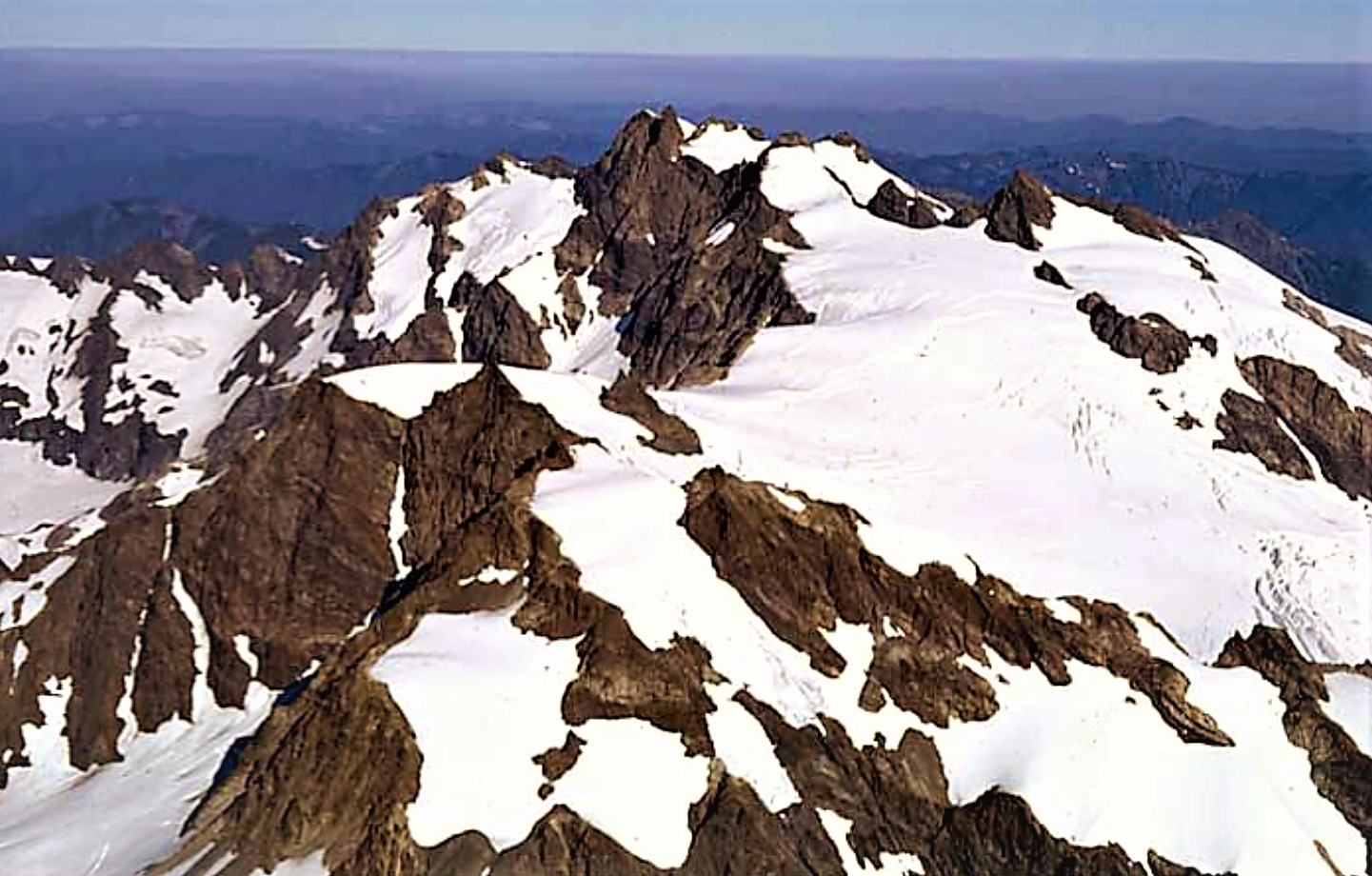
Aerial view of Athena (left foreground) and Mt. Olympus. Camera pointed northwest.

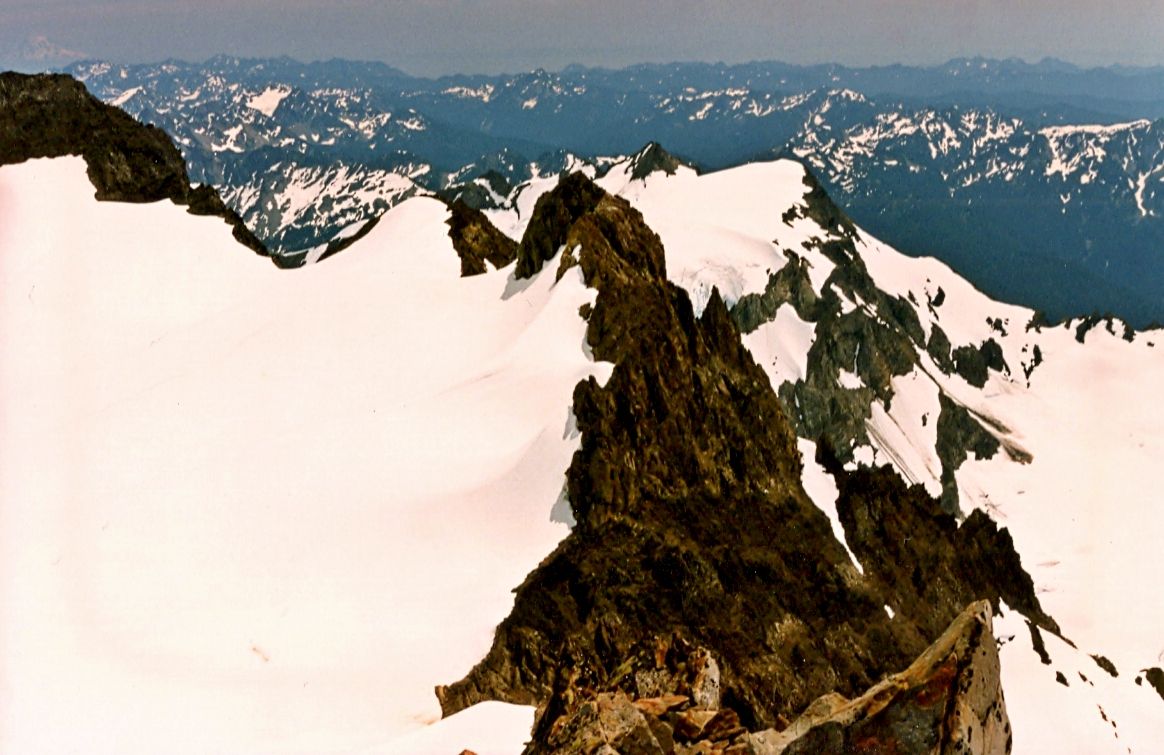
Athena seen from summit of Mt. Olympus

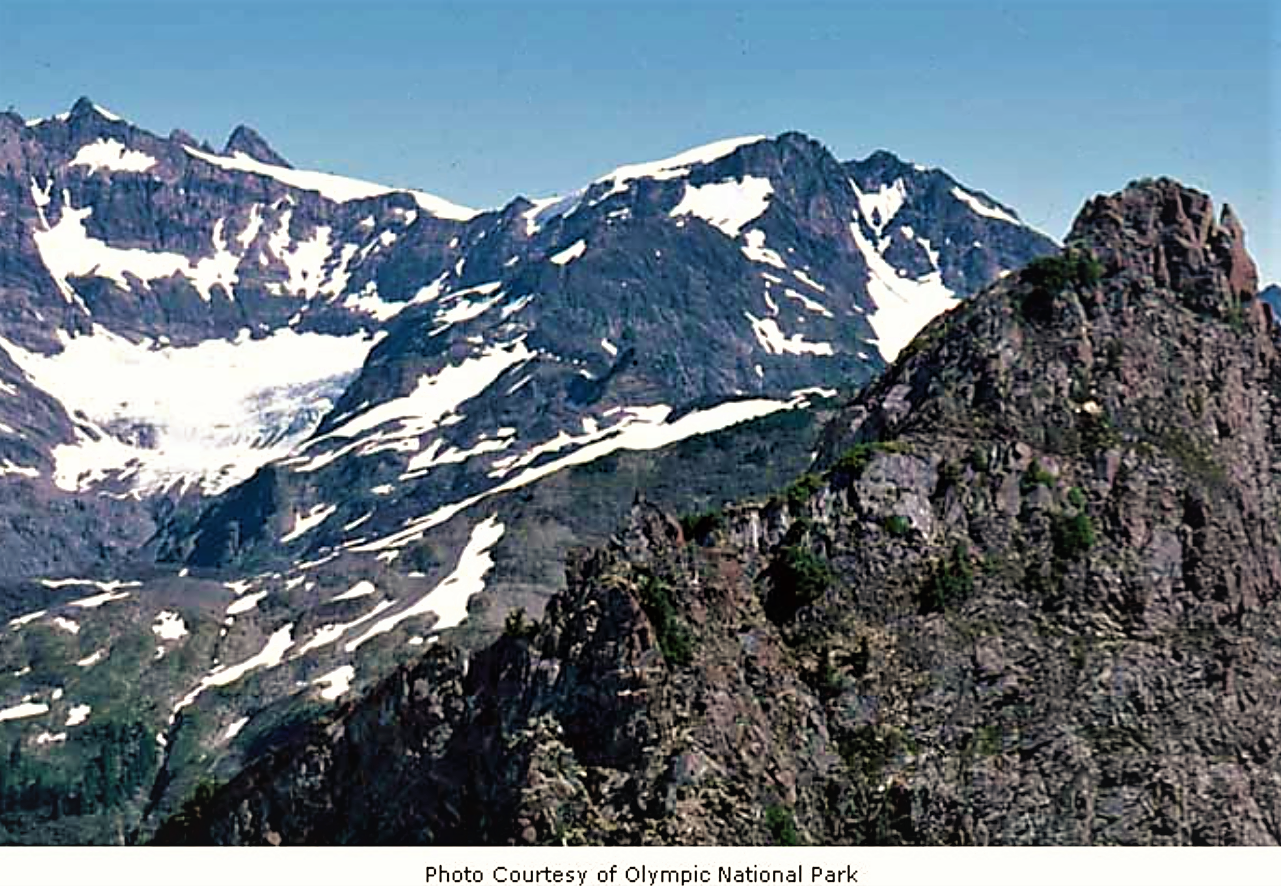
Hubert Glacier, Athena (right of center), Thor (foreground right) seen from Woden

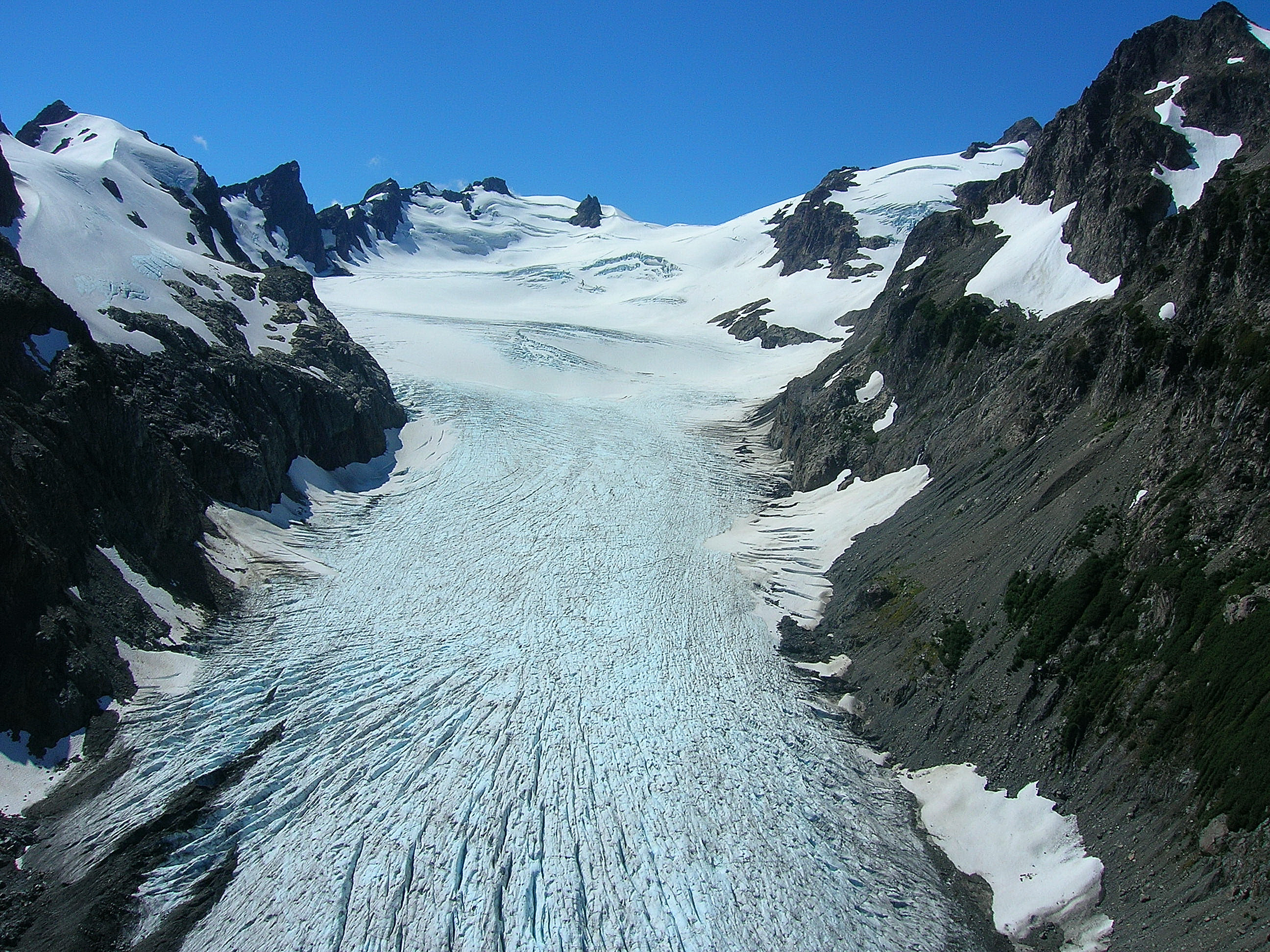
Athena left of center, at top above Hoh Glacier

== See also ==
- Geology of the Pacific Northwest
