= Jeffers Glacier =

Glacier in Washington, United States

- Location within Washington (state)
- Type: Mountain glacier
- Location: Mount Olympus, Olympic National Park, Jefferson County, Washington, USA
- Coordinates: 47°46′43″N 123°40′28″W
- Length: .35 mi (0.56 km)
- Terminus: Icefall and Talus

Jeffers Glacier is southeast of Mount Olympus in the Olympic Mountains in Olympic National Park, Washington, US. The glacier is relatively small compared to the nearby Hoh Glacier. Beginning at the foot of a very steep headwall at about 5,800 feet (1,800 m), the glacier descends northeast to about 4,900 ft (1,500 m) before terminating. Meltwater from the terminus flows to the Queets River.

The Jeffers Glacier is named for Olympia photographer Joseph Jeffers, who died after falling into a crevasse there in 1924.

== See also ==
- List of glaciers in the United States
