= Mount Lena (Washington) =

Mountain in Washington (state), United States

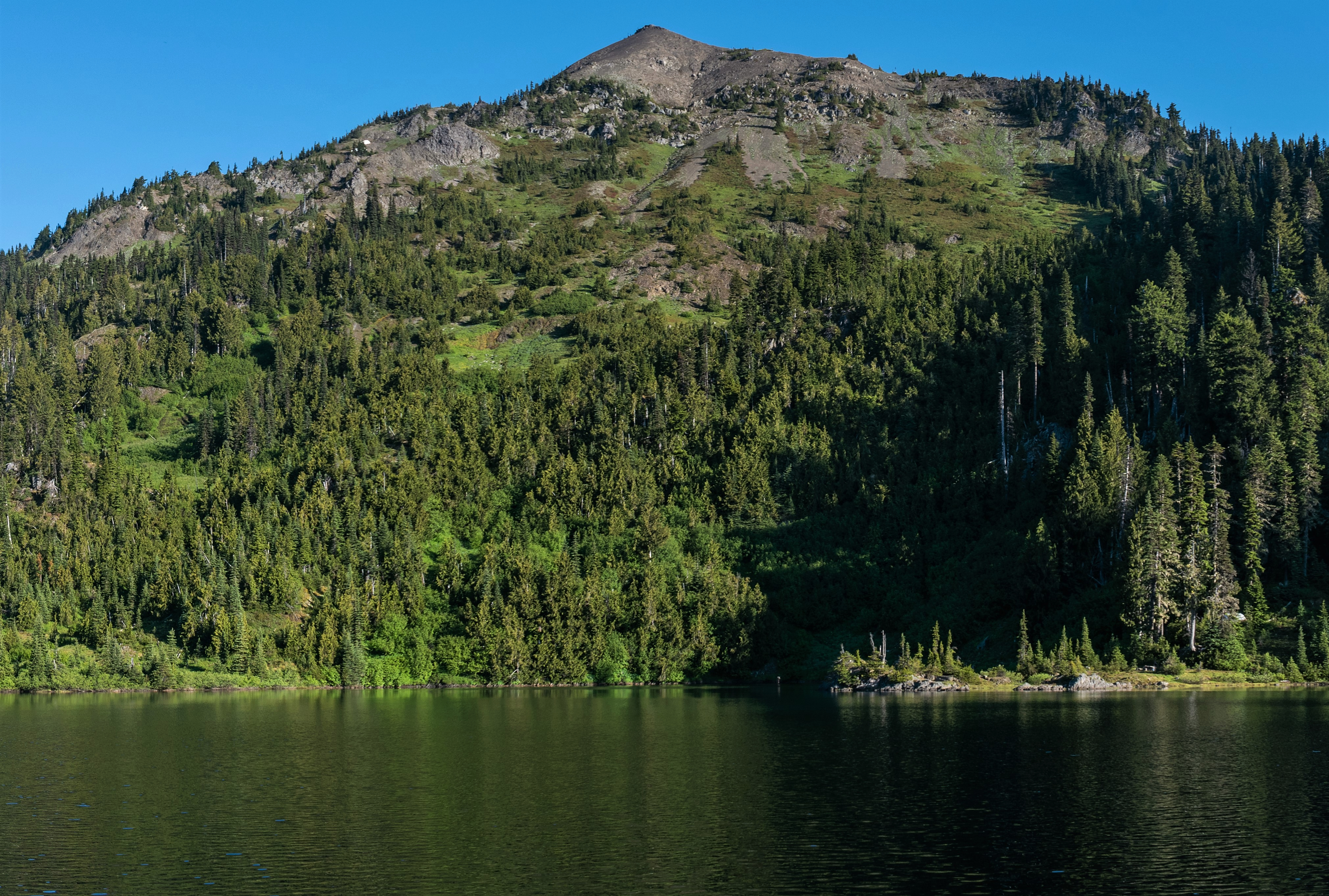
- Mt. Lena, southeast aspect

Highest point
- Elevation: 5,995 ft (1,827 m)
- Prominence: 1,035 ft (315 m)
- Parent peak: Mount Stone (6,612 ft)
- Isolation: 3.33 mi (5.36 km)
- Coordinates: 47°38′24″N 123°12′55″W

Geography
- Location within Washington (state) Location within the United States
- Country: United States
- State: Washington
- County: Jefferson
- Protected area: Olympic National Park
- Parent range: Olympic Mountains
- Topo map: USGS The Brothers

Climbing
- First ascent: Unknown
- Easiest route: class 2 hiking

Mount Lena is a 5,995-foot-elevation (1,827-meter) mountain summit located in the Olympic Mountains, in Jefferson County of Washington state. It is situated within Olympic National Park, immediately north and 1,500 feet above the shore of Upper Lena Lake. Mt. Lena has a subsidiary peak, East Peak (5800+ ft/1768+ m), which lies northeast of the lake. Mount Bretherton lies across the lake to the south, Mount Stone is three miles to the southwest, and The Brothers approximately 3.5 miles to the northeast. Precipitation runoff from the mountain drains north to the Duckabush River, and south into the Hamma Hamma River via Lena Creek. The non-technical ascent of Mount Lena involves hiking eight miles (one-way) and 5,300 feet elevation gain via the Upper Lena Lake Trail and cross-country above the lake, with most favorable conditions from July through September. There are pleasant campsites at the lake, and the ascent to the summit takes 1.5 hour from the lake. This mountain's toponym has been officially adopted by the United States Board on Geographic Names.

== Climate ==
Mount Lena is located in the marine west coast climate zone of western North America. Weather fronts originating in the Pacific Ocean travel northeast toward the Olympic Mountains. As fronts approach, they are forced upward by the peaks (orographic lift), causing them to drop their moisture in the form of rain or snow. As a result, the Olympics experience high precipitation, especially during the winter months in the form of snowfall. Because of maritime influence, snow tends to be wet and heavy, resulting in avalanche danger. During winter months weather is usually cloudy, but due to high pressure systems over the Pacific Ocean that intensify during summer months, there is often little or no cloud cover during the summer. The months June through September offer the most favorable weather for visiting.

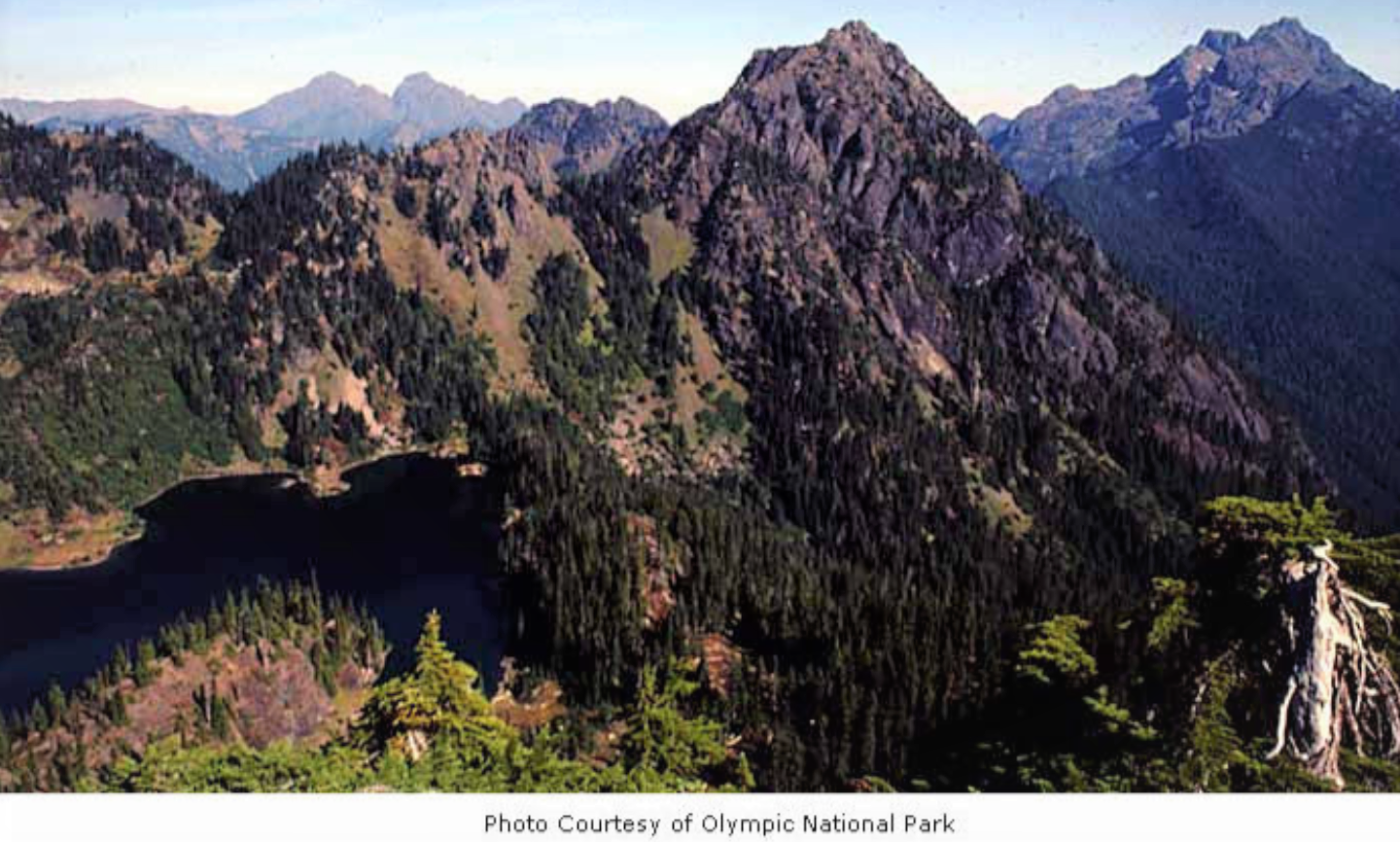
Mt. Lena's East Peak

== Geology ==
The Olympic Mountains are composed of obducted clastic wedge material and oceanic crust, primarily Eocene sandstone, turbidite, and basaltic oceanic crust. The mountains were sculpted during the Pleistocene era by erosion and glaciers advancing and retreating multiple times.

== See also ==
- Geology of the Pacific Northwest
- Geography of Washington (state)
