= Hubert Glacier =

Glacier in Washington, United States

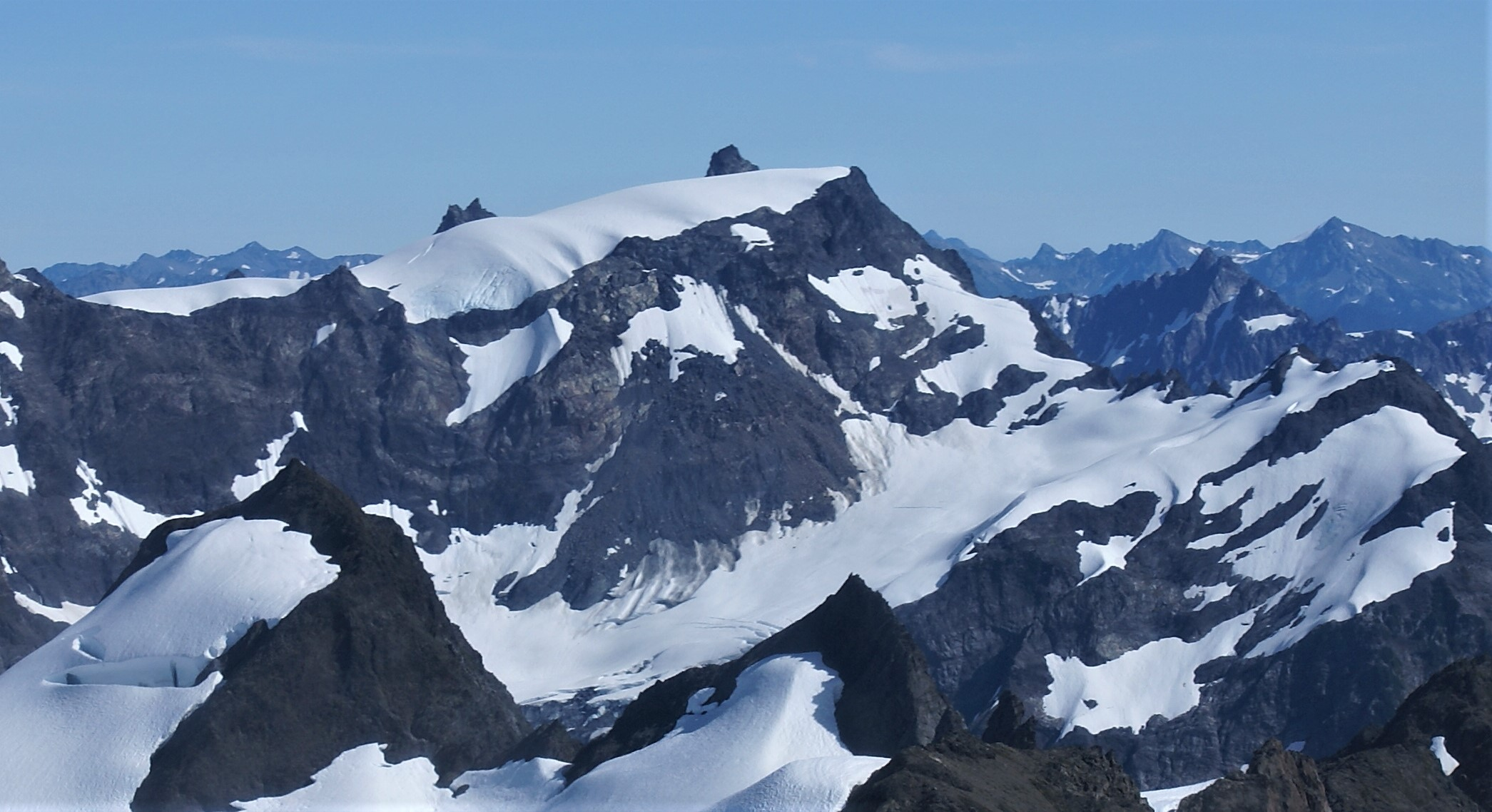
- Athena centered, Hubert Glacier below

- Location within Washington (state)
- Type: Mountain glacier
- Location: Mount Olympus, Olympic National Park, Jefferson County, Washington, USA
- Coordinates: 47°47′07″N 123°42′10″W
- Length: .25 mi (0.40 km)
- Terminus: Icefall and Talus

Hubert Glacier is located on the south side of Mount Olympus in the Olympic Mountains and Olympic National Park. Due to its southern orientation, the glacier is smaller than those on the north side of Mount Olympus, such as Blue Glacier.

Named for Anna Hubert, the only female member of the first ascent of Mount Olympus, the Hubert Glacier occupies a cirque at the bottom of the headwall, with one branch extending to the south up the mountainside. Starting from this highpoint of the glacier at 6,500 feet (2,000 m), it flows northward until it meets the glacial ice located in the cirque at about 5,600 ft (1,700 m). The glacier changes direction and flows west to its terminus at about 5,000 ft (1,500 m).

== See also ==
- List of glaciers in the United States
