= Mount Stone =

Mountain in Washington (state), United States

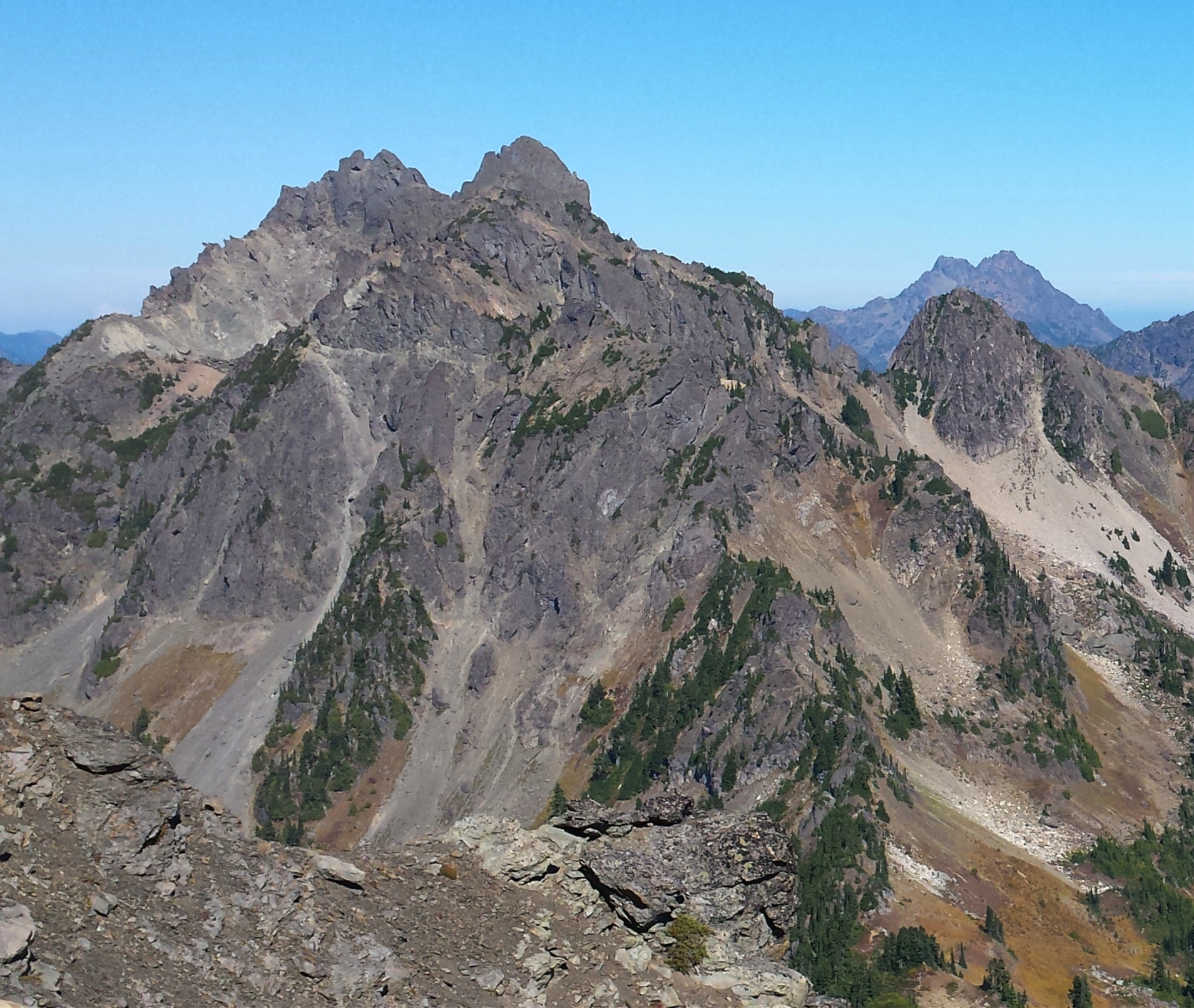
- Mount Stone

Highest point
- Elevation: 6,612 ft (2,015 m)
- Prominence: 2,132 ft (650 m)
- Coordinates: 47°36′23″N 123°16′00″W

Geography
- Location within Washington (state)
- Location: Olympic National Park; Mason County, Washington, U.S.
- Parent range: Olympic
- Topo map: USGS Mount Skokomish

Climbing
- Easiest route: Scramble

Mount Stone is a 6,612-foot (2,015 m) peak in the Olympic Mountains. It is the highest point in Mason County, Washington and exceeds 2,000 feet (610 m) in prominence.

Mount Stone can be reached via the North Hamma Hamma Road. Climbing Mount Stone involves a class 3 rock scramble (5000 feet elevation gain, 11 miles roundtrip). This can be done either as a day climb or an overnight trip (camping is available at the Lake of the Angels, ~4900 feet). On a clear day one can view many of the major peaks of the Olympic Mountains, including The Brothers, Mount Washington, Mount Anderson, Mount Deception, Mount Constance, and Mount Olympus.

== Climate ==
Based on the Köppen climate classification, Mount Stone is located in the marine west coast climate zone of western North America. Most weather fronts originate in the Pacific Ocean, and travel northeast toward the Olympic Mountains. As fronts approach, they are forced upward by the peaks of the Olympic Range, causing them to drop their moisture in the form of rain or snowfall (Orographic lift). As a result, the Olympics experience high precipitation, especially during the winter months. During winter months, weather is usually cloudy, but, due to high pressure systems over the Pacific Ocean that intensify during summer months, there is often little or no cloud cover during the summer. Because of maritime influence, snow tends to be wet and heavy, resulting in avalanche danger. Precipitation runoff from the mountain drains into tributaries of the Duckabush, Hamma Hamma, and the Skokomish rivers.

== Gallery ==
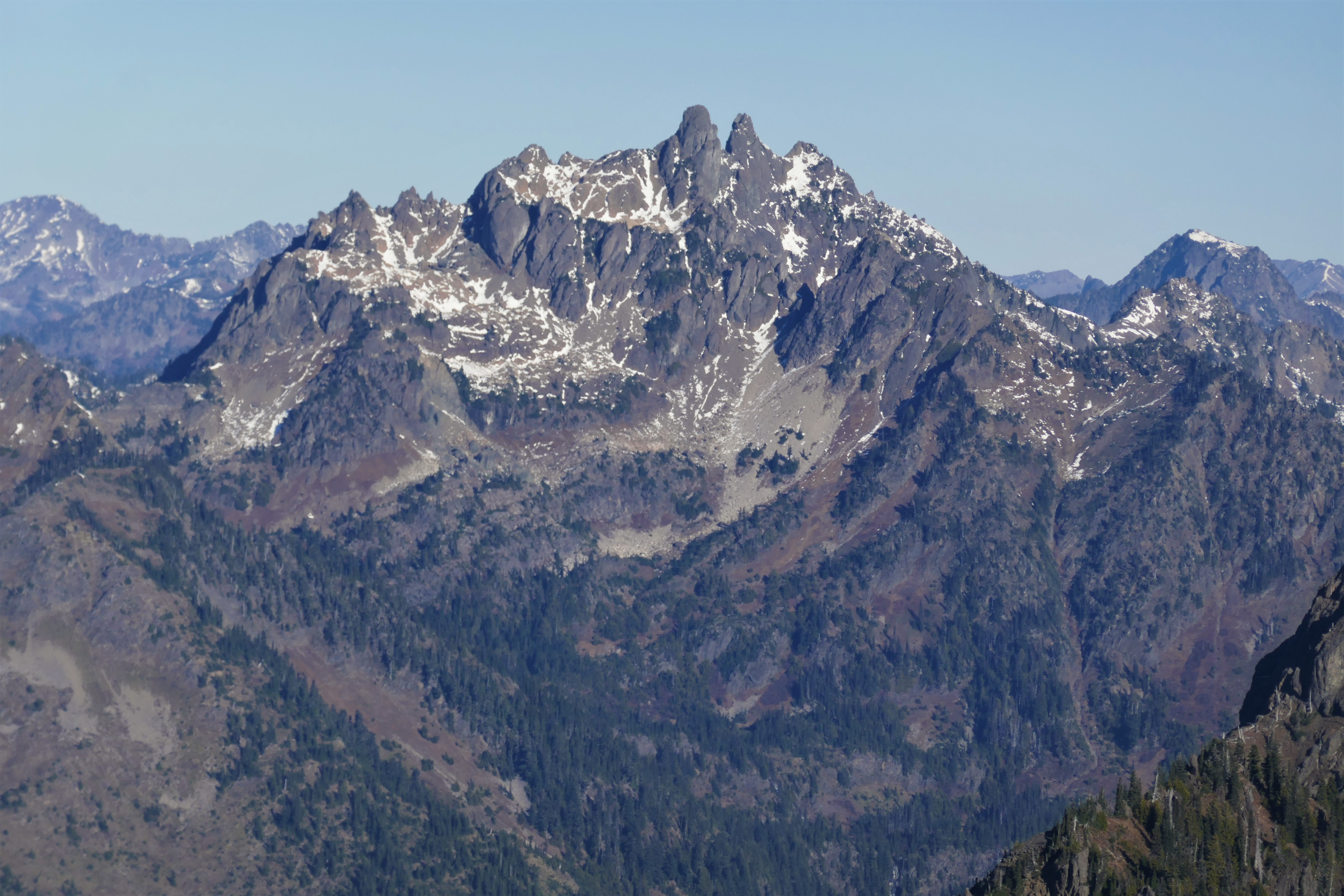
Mount Stone from Mount Ellinor

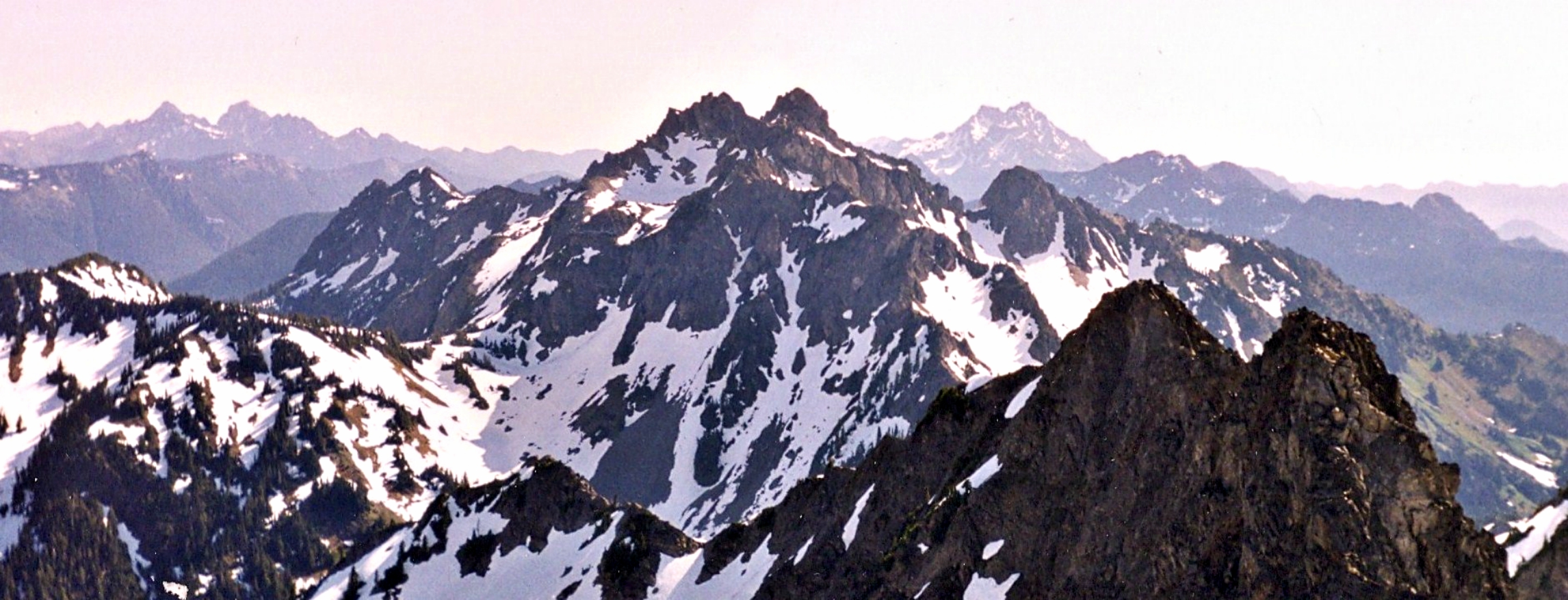
Mount Stone seen from Mount Skokomish

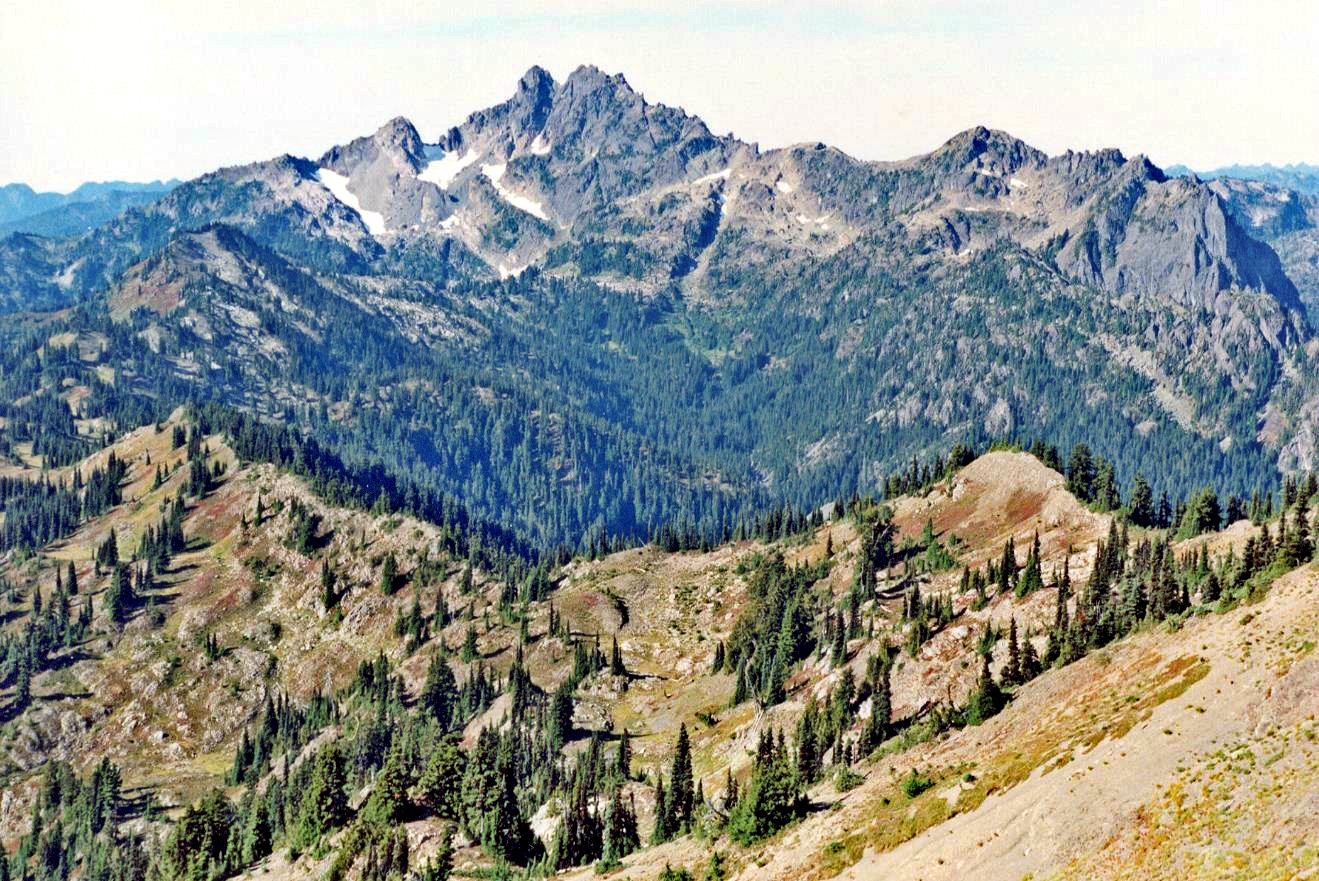
Mount Stone from Mt. Lena
