= Oil City, Washington =

Unincorporated community in Washington, United States

Oil City
- Interactive map of Oil City
- Coordinates: 47.7503557°N 124.4254785°W
- Country: United States
- State: Washington
- County: Jefferson

Population
  - Total: 5
- Time zone: Pacific
- Zip code: 98331

Oil City is an unincorporated community located in north-western Jefferson County, Washington on the western coast of the United States and at the mouth of the Hoh River.

The townsite was platted in 1911 by the Olympic Oil Company, which intended to develop a deepwater oil port at the mouth of the Hoh. In the 1930s, the presence of the Jefferson Oil Seep in the area attracted the attention of oil speculators, and many platted lots were sold to optimistic buyers in anticipation of an oil boom. 11 wells were drilled between 1931 and 1937. Initial reports claimed production of up to 100 barrels a day from some wells, but these numbers decreased quickly.

Eventually, the involved oil interests concluded that reserves in the area were not of marketable quantities. Additionally, the plotted area where Oil City was to be built proved too rugged and remote for viable development. This information was not provided to the general public, and many of the lots were sold as prime investment opportunities to unsuspecting investors who believed an oil boom still loomed in the region. The city plots remained obscure and undeveloped until 2008, when access to the site was made possible with road use agreements between the developer and the logging companies in the area. Oil City is now a burgeoning off-grid community nestled next to the Olympic National Park and the only private property available between La Push to the north and Queets to the south. Oil City is governed loosely by a small landowners' association.
