= Hoh River =

River in the United States

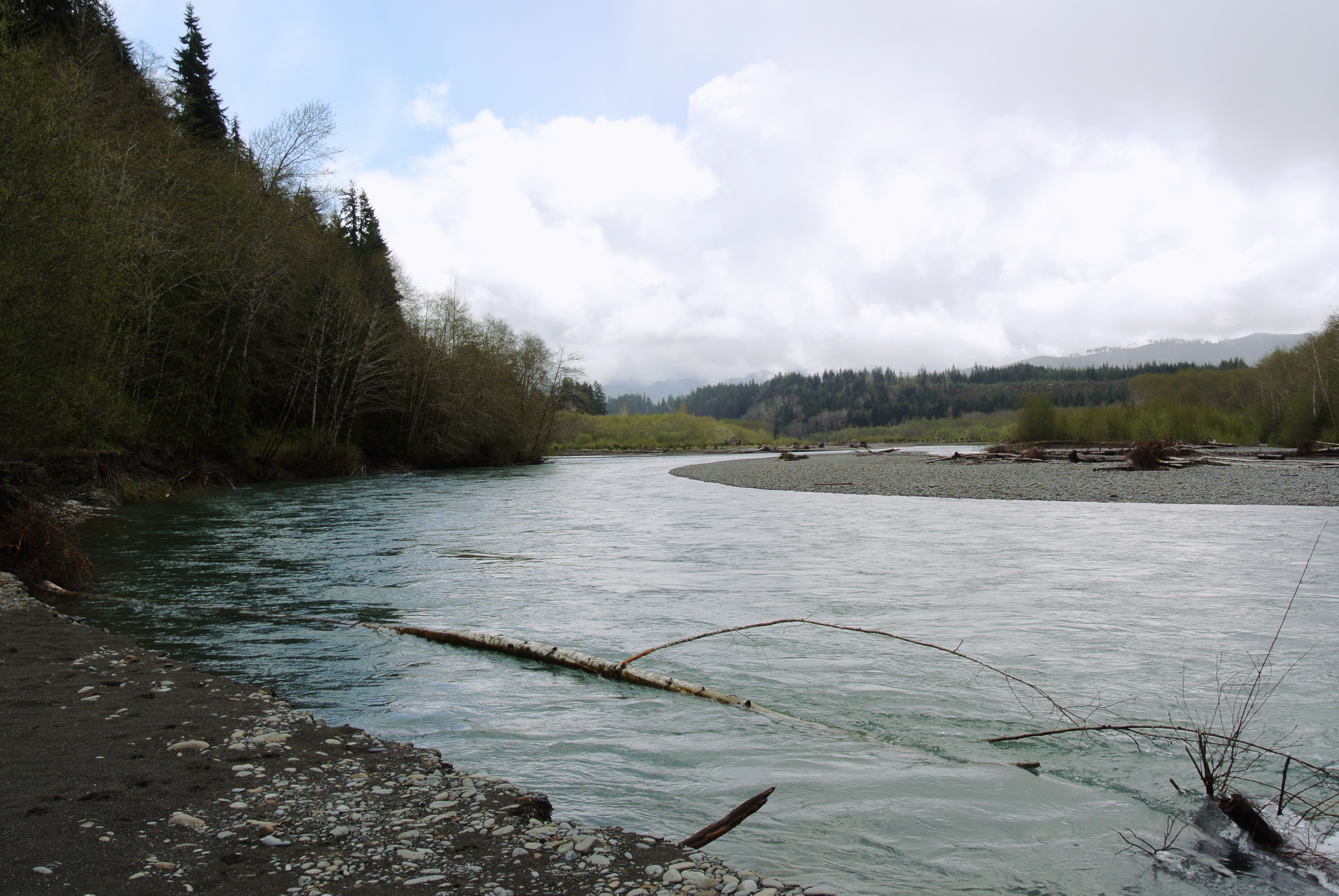
- The Hoh river in spring

- Location of the mouth of the Hoh River in Washington
- Etymology: Hoh Native American tribe

Location
- Country: United States
- State: Washington
- Counties: Clallam, Jefferson

Physical characteristics
- Source: Hoh Glacier
  - location: Mount Olympus, Olympic Mountains, Washington
  - coordinates: 47°48′37″N 123°38′55″W
  - elevation: 7,000 ft (2,100 m)
- Mouth: Pacific Ocean
  - coordinates: 47°44′58″N 124°26′21″W
- Length: 56 mi (90 km)
- Basin size: 299 sq mi (770 km^{2})
- Discharge
  - location: river mile 15.4 near Forks
  - average: 2,538 cu ft/s (71.9 m^{3}/s)
  - minimum: 252 cu ft/s (7.1 m^{3}/s)
  - maximum: 40,000 cu ft/s (1,100 m^{3}/s)

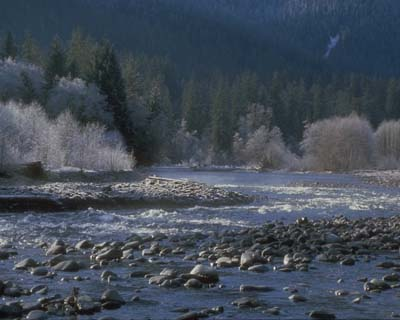
The Hoh River in winter.

The Hoh River is a river of the Pacific Northwest, located on the Olympic Peninsula in the U.S. state of Washington. About 56 miles (90 km) long, the Hoh River originates at the snout of Hoh Glacier on Mount Olympus and flows westward through the Olympic Mountains of Olympic National Park and Olympic National Forest, then through foothills in a broad valley, emptying into the Pacific Ocean at the Hoh Indian Reservation. The final portion of the Hoh River's course marks the boundary between the south coastal segment of Olympic National Park and the Hoh Indian Reservation.

The Hoh's drainage basin is 299 square miles (770 km^{2}). Its discharge, or streamflow, has considerable seasonal variation, with summer flow averaging about one-third that of winter flows.

The Hoh is a glacial river fed by glaciers on Mount Olympus, such as the Blue Glacier. The glaciers grind rock into a fine glacial flour which turns the Hoh River a milky slate blue color. The river valley is generally broad and relatively flat, causing the glacial sediments to settle out, creating extensive gravel bars, river meanders, and the many side channels characteristic of a braided river.

One of the road entrances to Olympic National Park exits from Olympic Highway 101 twelve miles south of Forks, WA and follows the north bank of Hoh River upstream to the Hoh Rain Forest Visitor Center, campground, and the trailhead for the Hoh River Trail. This hiking trail follows the river 12 miles through the Hoh Rain Forest to the base of Mount Olympus, and then continues to climb steeply another 6 miles to Glacier Meadows campsite, and the start of the primary climbing route for Mount Olympus. Logjams in the river channel are common, resulting in quiet pools and new river braids being formed.

The river's name and the name of the Hoh tribe both ultimately come from the Quinault placename /húx^{w}/.

== Course ==
The source of the Hoh River is meltwater from Hoh Glacier on the northeast side of Mount Olympus. The river flows north then west, curving around the entire north side of the mountain. It collects headwater tributaries from other glaciers on Mount Olympus including Glacier Creek, which flows from Blue Glacier and White Glacier, and the Ice River, which flows from the nearby Ice River Glacier on Mount Mercury. Mount Tom Creek, a tributary which joins the Hoh farther downstream, has its source in a western arm of the White Glacier as well. Other headwater tributaries include Elkhorn Creek and Cream Lake Creek, both of which originate from the Bailey Range. About a mile below the Glacier Creek confluence, at approximately Hoh river mile 48, the valley broadens and the Hoh begins to take on the braided channel characteristic of a bottomland river. Falls Creek joins from the south, then Slate Creek and Hoh Creek from the north.

Olympus Ranger Station, a National Park Service cabin, is located on the north side of the river at approximately river mile 45, near the junction of the Hoh River Trail and the Hoh Lake Trail. The Happy Four backcountry camping area is located along the river trail a few miles downstream. Below that the tributary Cougar Creek joins from the north, then Mount Tom Creek from the south. Jackson Creek joins from the south at approximately river mile 37 near the Hoh Rain Forest Visitor Center and campground. The Visitor Center is located at the end of Upper Hoh Road and the beginning of the Hoh River Trail. The Upper Hoh Road runs east from U.S. Highway 101, paralleling the Hoh River from Willoughby Creek Campground to the national park. In the region near the national park boundary the Hoh River occupies a U-shaped valley with a flat bottom about one mile across. Mountain slopes rise steeply on either side.

The Hoh River continues flowing west, collecting numerous tributary streams, the most important being the South Fork Hoh River, which joins the main Hoh at about river mile 31. About a mile below the South Fork confluence the Hoh River leaves Olympic National Park. It continues to flow west through a widening valley surrounded by low mountains and foothills. Ranches occupy parts of the valley and land ownership is generally private. Owl Creek and Maple Creek join from the south. The Hoh makes a small northward bend, skirting the edge of, and briefly entering Olympic National Forest. Elk Creek joins from the south, then Alder Creek from the north, then Winfield Creek from the south, after which the Hoh River flows through a large horseshoe bend located at about river mile 15. Hell Roaring Creek joins the horseshoe bend from the north. Three campgrounds are sited along the river upstream from the horseshoe bend, including Minnie Peterson, Willoughby Creek, and Hoh Oxbow. All three are managed by Washington State Department of Natural Resources (DNR). Hoh Ox Bow Campground is located just west of the horseshoe bend near where U.S. Highway 101 crosses the river. Highway 101 follows the river on the south side. The small Oil City Road follows the Hoh River on the north side to the river's mouth. Cottonwood Campground, another DNR site, is on the north side of the Hoh River, accessed by Oil City Road.

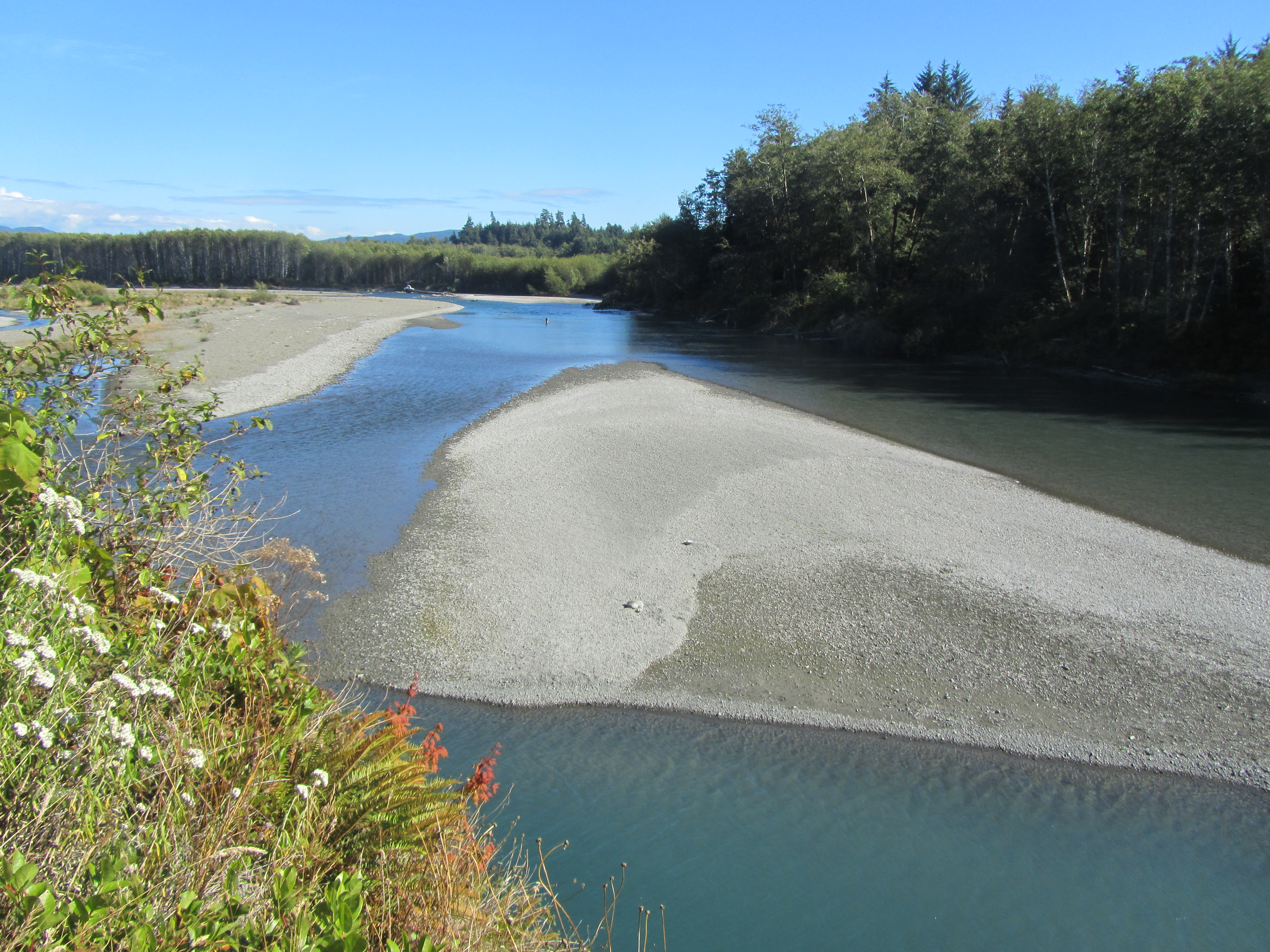
Near the mouth of the river

Below the horseshoe bend the Hoh River begins to meander widely through a broad and flat coastal floodplain. In its final miles the Hoh River collects the tributaries Braden Creek, Fletcher Creek and Fossil Creek. Highway 101 leaves the river at this point and continues south. About two miles from its mouth the Hoh River forms the boundary between the Hoh Indian Reservation on the south bank, and the coastal portion of Olympic National Park to the north. The former settlement of Oil City is located on the north side of the Hoh River about a half mile from its mouth. A large headland peninsula called Hoh Head is located on the Pacific coast a few miles north of the river's mouth.

=== South Fork ===
The South Fork Hoh River originates at 47°46′53″N 123°43′2″W, flowing from Hubert Glacier and other small glaciers on the south side of Mount Olympus. It flows generally west through Olympic National Park collecting many tributary streams. At about river mile 11 it enters a broad glacially carved U-shaped valley and becomes braided. The South Fork leaves Olympic National Park at approximately river mile 4, entering Olympic National Forest. It turns slightly northwest and joins the main Hoh River at approximately Hoh river mile 31. South Fork Campground, managed by Washington State DNR, is located on the South Fork. The road to the campground continues up the South Fork Hoh River to the South Fork Hoh Trailhead, just west of the national park boundary.

== History ==
The indigenous people of the Hoh River are known as the Hoh but they call themselves chalat'. Their name for the Hoh River is chalak'ac'it.

The earliest documented encounter between Europeans and the Hoh people occurred in 1787 when the British fur trader Charles William Barkley, captain of the Imperial Eagle, dispatched a boat up the Hoh River to trade with the natives. The boat's crew of six were killed by the Hoh people, according to European histories. The incident led to the naming of Destruction Island. Barkley named the river Destruction River, but the name became attached to the island instead. The Hoh people deny the story, saying they never massacred ship-wrecked sailors.

In 1808 the Russian American Company set two vessels south from Russian America as part of an effort to expand Russian control south to the Columbia River and beyond. One of the vessels, the schooner Sv. Nikolai ran aground at Rialto Beach, north of the Quillayute River. Tension between the crew and the local Hohs led to battle. The Russians fled south along the coast to the mouth of the Hoh River where many were captured and taken captive by the Hoh people. Those who evaded capture fled up the Hoh River. They built a small blockhouse and survived into the winter. In February they surrendered to the Hoh tribe at the mouth of the Hoh River. The captives were exchanged and traded among the coastal tribes, with most ending up with the Makah in the Neah Bay area. In 1810 the Lydia, commanded by Captain T. Brown, an American working for the Russian American Company, sailed into Neah Bay. The thirteen surviving captives being held by the Makah were ransomed by Captain Brown, who then returned them to Sitka.

In the 1850s Isaac Stevens, the first governor of Washington Territory, began negotiations with the tribes of the Olympic Peninsula with the goal of obtaining land cessions and creating Indian reservations. In 1855 a treaty was signed by representatives of the Quinault, Queets, Quileute, and Hoh. The negotiations were done in the trade pidgin language Chinook Jargon. The treaty, known as the Treaty of Olympia (or the Quinault River Treaty), was ratified by Congress in 1859. Its terms included the cession of most of the western Olympic Peninsula to the U.S. federal government with a reserve to be determined later. The Quinault Indian Reservation was established in 1863 and the treaty signature tribes were expected to move there. The Hoh, however, refused to move. In 1872 the Indian agent R.H. Milroy explained that the Hoh did not believe they had agreed to cede their land and that the treaty signed had been explained to them as being an agreement about keeping peace with U.S. citizens and allowing them to enter the Hoh's territory and trade for furs. In 1893 President Grover Cleveland signed an executive order establishing the Hoh Reservation on the south side of the mouth of the Hoh River.

Early pioneers wishing to settle in the Hoh River valley faced numerous challenges including the dense forest and enormous trees, regular large-scale flooding, isolation from markets, and the impracticality of navigating the Hoh River due to its swift current, floods, and frequent logjams. Nevertheless, land relatively far upriver was settled. The area now within Olympic National Park was never inhabited by non-indigenous people. By 1900 the population in the Hoh River Valley was enough to warrant two post offices, one established in 1897, the other in 1904. Over time the population dwindled. By 1919 there were few people left. Abandoned structures rapidly deteriorated in the wet environment. The few historic structures that used to exist in the Hoh River Valley are entirely gone today.

On the north side of the mouth of the Hoh River, across from the Hoh Indian Reservation, the town of Oil City was established in 1911 by Frank W. Johnson and the Olympic Oil Company. Natives had already discovered the oil, which seeps to the surface. This was to be a deep water oil port. Many of the lots were bought on the hopes of oil prosperity, but some were used for vacation homes. Oil drilling operations were conducted by the Milwaukee Oil Co., the Washington Oil Co., the Jefferson Oil Co. and others in the surrounding areas. No significant commercial oil reserves were found. Later, two-thirds of the platted city were returned to the state which now forms part of the Olympic Wilderness Park. http://www.historylink.org/index.cfm?DisplayPage=output.cfm&file_id=7446

== Natural history ==
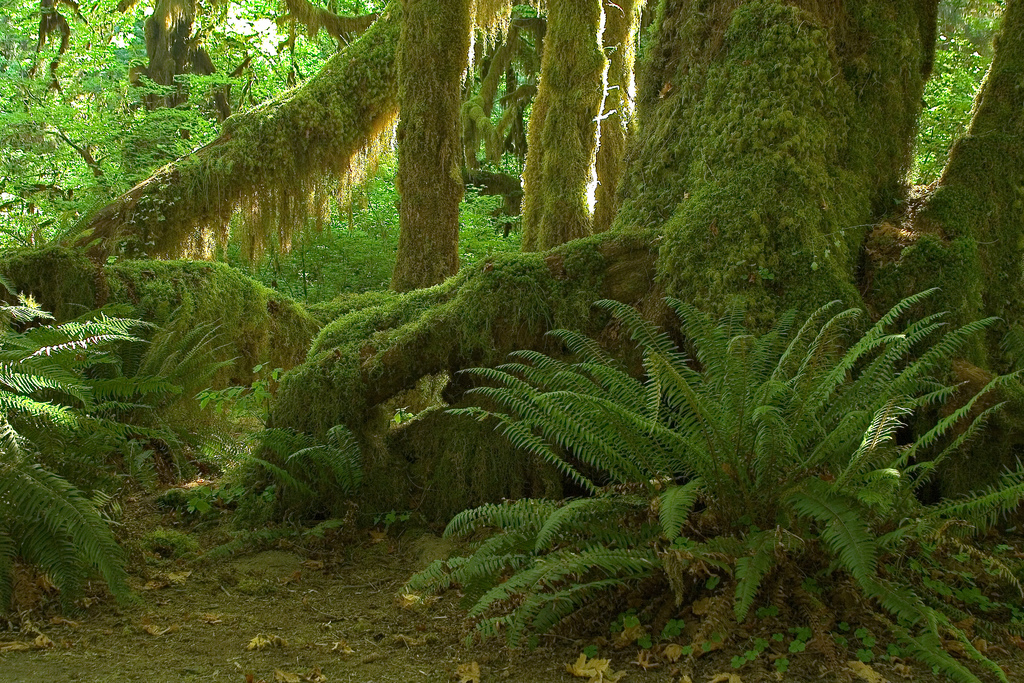
Hoh Rain Forest

A significant part of the Hoh River flows through the Hoh Rainforest, a relatively rare example of a temperate rain forest. Abundant winter rainfall results in a lush green canopy of coniferous and deciduous trees, often covered with mosses and ferns. Annual precipitation is 140 to 170 inches (3,600 to 4,300 mm). According to the National Park Service the Hoh Rain Forest is one of the finest remaining examples of temperate rain forest in the United States. It is one of the most popular destinations of Olympic National Park. Giant Western Hemlock, Douglas-fir, Thuja plicata (Western Red Cedar), and Sitka Spruce trees dominate the landscape, while ferns and mosses cloak the trees and forest floor. Fallen trees often become nurse logs.

When Olympic National Park was created in 1938 one of its primary objectives was to protect the herds of Roosevelt elk. Today about 400 of the park's 4,000–5,000 elk live in the Hoh River valley.

The Hoh River supports a variety of salmonid fish, including spring and fall chinook, coho salmon, winter and summer steelhead, and sea-run coastal cutthroat trout. There are also smaller numbers of chum and sockeye salmon. The Hoh River fishery is managed by the Hoh tribe in cooperation with the Washington Department of Fish and Wildlife .

== Land use ==
Land administration within the Hoh River's watershed, approximately, is 57.6% National Park Service (171.7 sq mi (445 km^{2})), 24.4% state (72.6 sq mi (188 km^{2})), 17.6% private (52.5 sq mi (136 km^{2})), 0.22% National Forest (0.64 sq mi (1.7 km^{2})), and 0.21% Hoh Indian Reservation (0.63 sq mi (1.6 km^{2})).

== Recreation ==
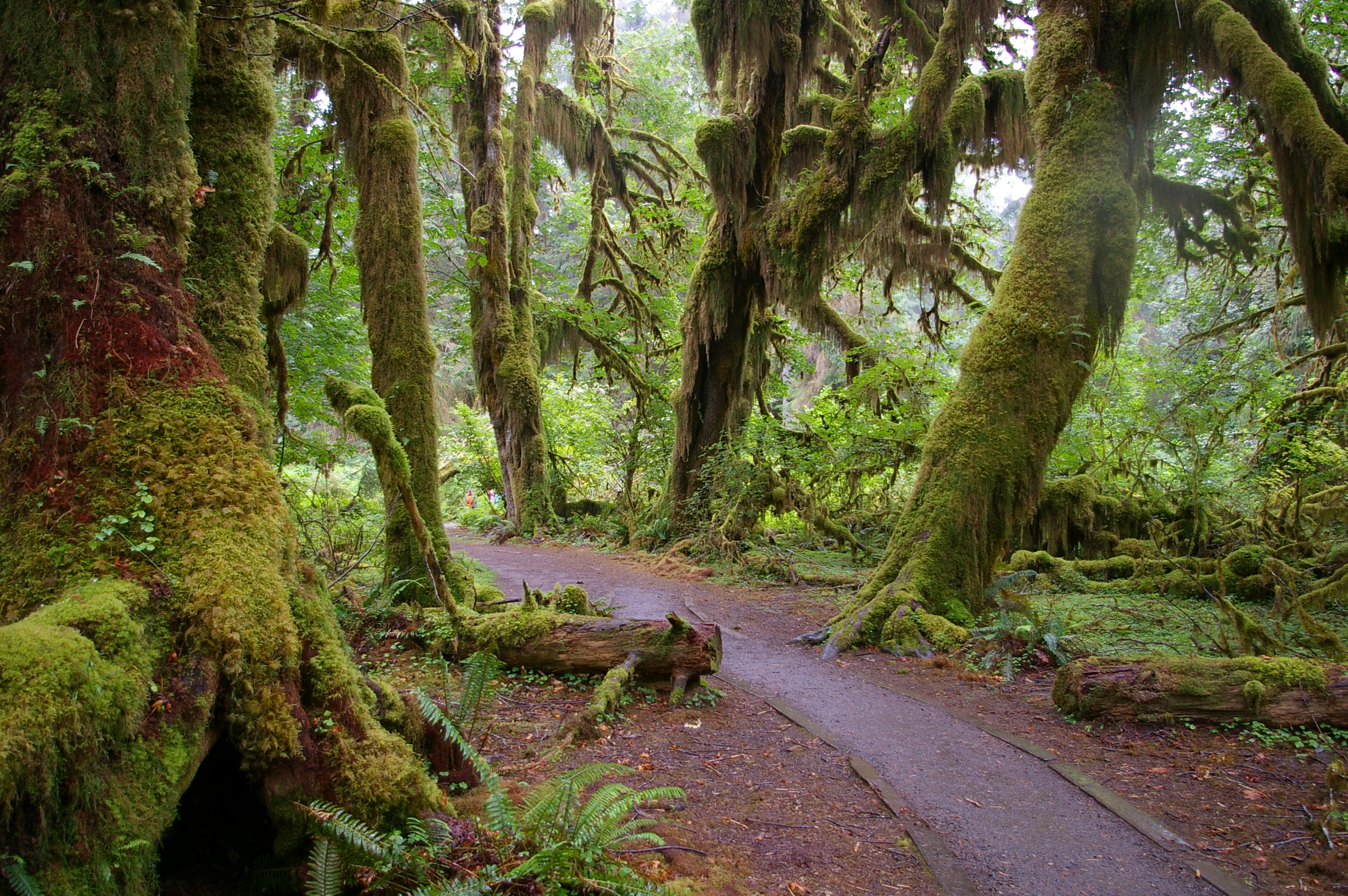
Trail in the Hoh Rain Forest

The Hoh River Trail, managed by the National Park Service, begins at the national park's Hoh Rain Forest Visitor Center at the end of the Upper Hoh Road. The trail follows the Hoh River east into the heart of the park. After 17.5 mi (28.2 km) it reaches Glacier Meadows near Mount Olympus's Blue Glacier. The Hoh River Trail begins at an altitude of about 600 ft (180 m) and the trail is mostly flat for about 13 mi (21 km), after which it ascends steeply to Glacier Meadows, altitude 4,300 ft (1,300 m). The trail passes through the Hoh Rain Forest, a temperate rain forest, and, closer to Mount Olympus, montane forests and subalpine meadows. There are a number of backcountry campsites along the trail. Mountaineers wishing to climb Mount Olympus typically use the Hoh River Trail to reach the mountain. The climb requires experience with glacier travel and crevasse rescue skills.

The Hoh Lake Trail branches off from the Hoh River Trail near the Olympus Ranger Station and ascends to Hoh Lake and Bogachiel Peak, then across High Divide into the Sol Duc River valley.

The Oil City Trail, managed by Olympic National Park, begins on the north side of the mouth of the Hoh River and runs about a mile to the Pacific coast. People can hike north along the coast to Hoh Head and beyond.

== See also ==
- List of rivers of Washington (state)
