= Braden Creek =

Stream in Washington, U.S.

Coordinates: 47°44′27″N 124°21′23″W

Braden Creek is a stream in the U.S. state of Washington.

Braden Creek was named after L. E. Braden, a pioneer settler.

== See also ==
- List of rivers of Washington (state)
