= Hoh Glacier =

Glacier on Mount Olympus in the U.S.

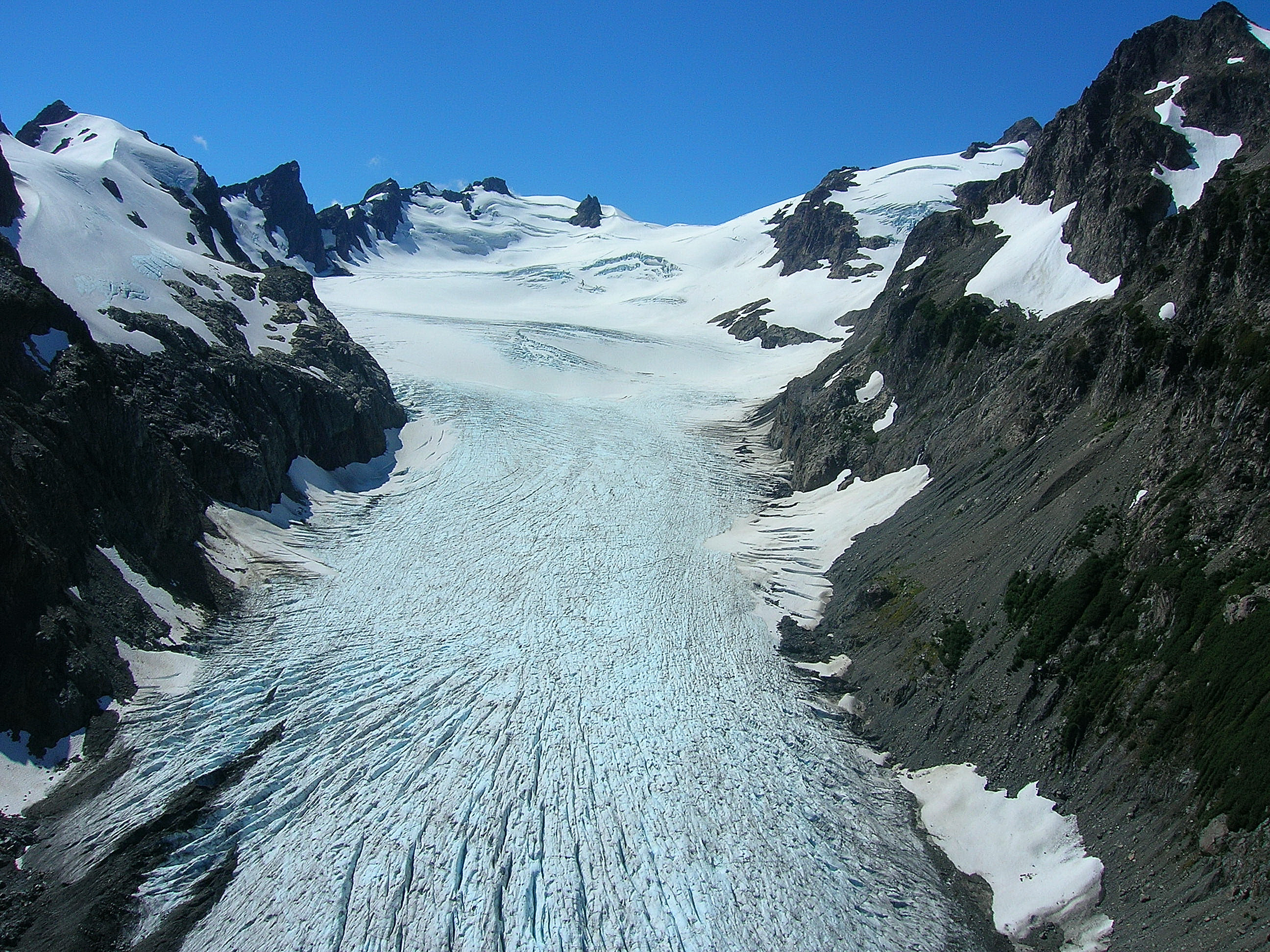
- Aerial view of Hoh Glacier

- Location within Washington (state)
- Type: Mountain glacier
- Location: Mount Olympus, Olympic National Park, Jefferson County, Washington, U.S.
- Coordinates: 47°47′54″N 123°40′13″W
- Length: 3.06 miles (4.93 km)

Hoh Glacier is a glacier on Mount Olympus in the Olympic National Park in Jefferson County of the U.S. state of Washington. It is the source of the Hoh River. Hoh Glacier is the longest glacier on Mount Olympus at 3.06 miles (4.93 km), though it is smaller in volume than Blue Glacier.

== Climate ==
Based on the Köppen climate classification, Hoh Glacier is located in the marine west coast climate zone of western North America. Most weather fronts originate in the Pacific Ocean, and travel northeast toward the Olympic Mountains. As fronts approach, they are forced upward by the peaks of the Olympic Range, causing them to drop their moisture in the form of rain or snowfall (orographic lift). As a result, the Olympics experience high precipitation, especially during the winter months. During winter months, weather is usually cloudy, but, due to high pressure systems over the Pacific Ocean that intensify during summer months, there is often little or no cloud cover during the summer.

== See also ==
- List of glaciers in the United States

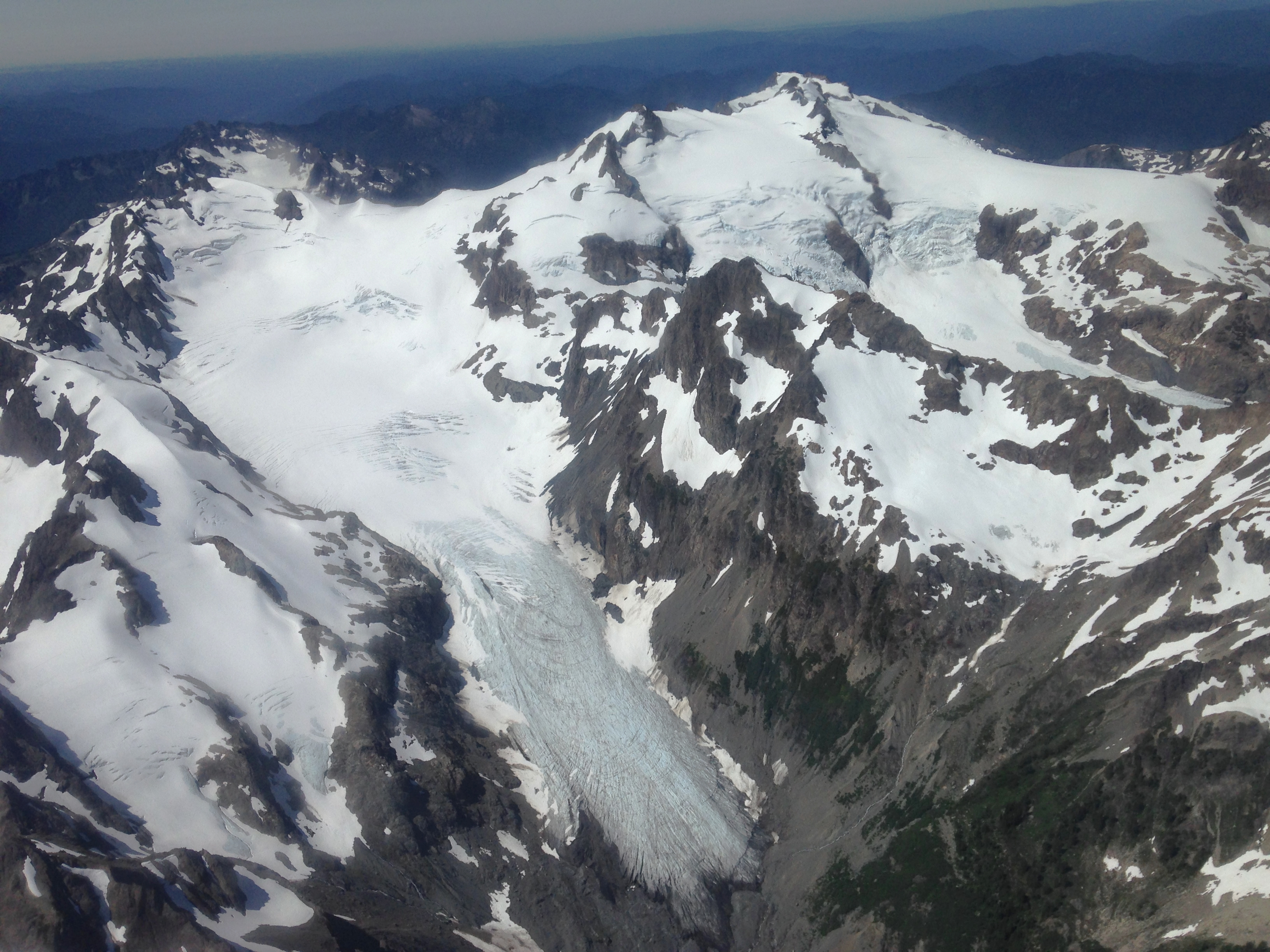
Hoh Glacier, Mt. Mathias, and Mt. Olympus
