= Blue Glacier =

Glacier in Washington, United States

Blue
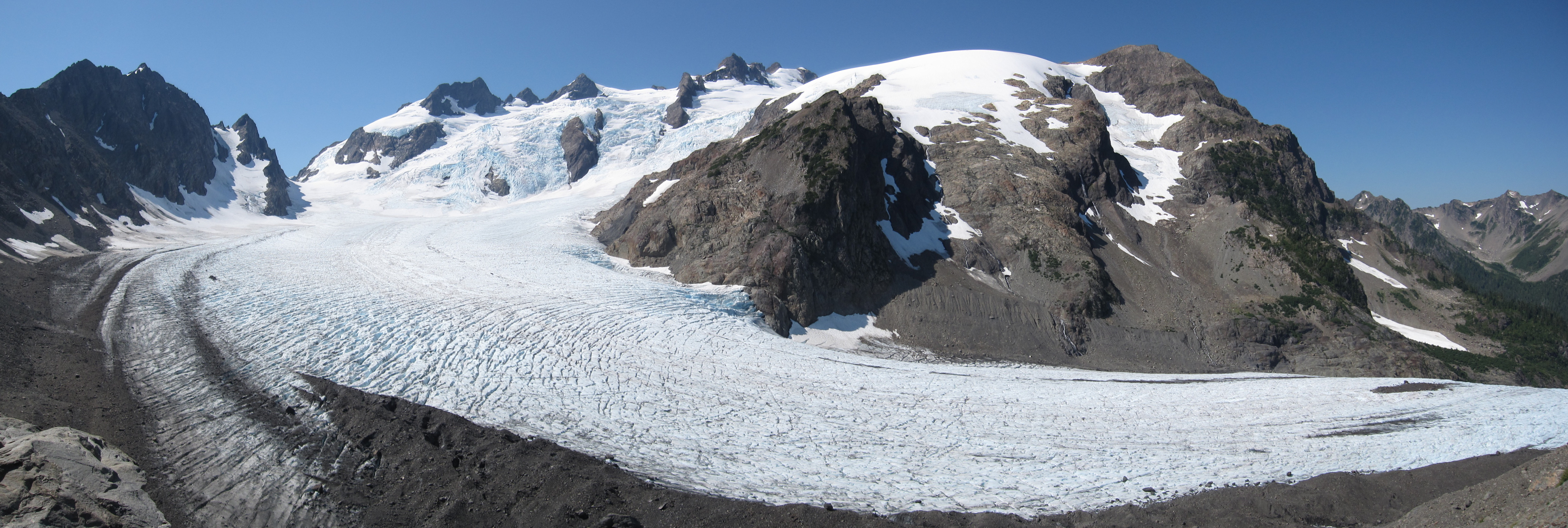
- The Blue Glacier as seen from the Lateral Moraine.

- Location within Washington (state)
- Type: Mountain glacier
- Location: Mount Olympus, Olympic National Park, Jefferson County, Washington, USA
- Coordinates: 47°48′09″N 123°41′12″W
- Area: 1.7 sq mi (4.4 km^{2})
- Length: 2.7 mi (4.3 km)
- Thickness: 900 ft (270 m)
- Terminus: Icefall
- Status: Retreating

Blue Glacier is a large glacier located to the north of Mount Olympus in the Olympic Mountains of Washington. The glacier covers an area of 1.7 sq mi (4.4 km^{2}) and contains 580,000,000 cu ft (16,000,000 m^{3}) of ice and snow in spite of its low terminus elevation. The glacier length has decreased from about 3.4 mi (5.5 km) in 1800 to 2.7 mi (4.3 km) in the year 2000. Just in the period from 1995 and 2006, Blue Glacier retreated 325 ft (99 m). Blue Glacier is also thinning as it retreats and between 1987 and 2009 the glacier lost 178 ft (54 m) of its depth near its terminus and between 32 and 48 ft (9.8 and 14.6 m) in the uppermost sections of the glacier known as the accumulation zone.

== Description ==
Arêtes and upper Blue Glacier

Starting at an elevation of 7,800 feet (2,380 m) near Mount Olympus's three summits, the Blue Glacier begins as a snow/ice field separated by arêtes. As the glacier flows north, it cascades down a steep slope and thus, the smooth ice turns into a chaotic icefall, replete with seracs and crevasses. After the ice passes the icefall, the glacier ends up in a valley and takes a left turn to the west. Another ice stream from a snowdome located to the northwest of Mount Olympus joins the Blue Glacier and together, the joined ice streams flow down to a cliff at 4,050 feet (1,234 m). On this steep, barren, rocky slope, the Blue Glacier terminates after dropping over 3,700 feet (1,130 m) in only 2.7 mi (4.3 km). The rocky cliff used to host a second icefall before the terminus of Blue Glacier retreated up the cliff.

A weather station operated from 1957 to 1963 at an elevation of 6910 ft near the glacier recorded rain and snowfall events, and average temperatures. However, the temperature record is irregular and contains mostly summer months. Nevertheless, at least one snow event occurred in all twelve months during the six years the station was operated.

== Hydrology ==
Due to orographic lift and the glacier's proximity to the Pacific Ocean, more precipitation falls on the Blue Glacier than any other glacier in the lower 48 United States. About 180 in (460 cm) of precipitation falls on the upper reaches of Mount Olympus and Blue Glacier each year. During winter, most of the precipitation on Blue Glacier consists of snow. In addition, a significant amount of rain falls on the Blue Glacier as well, especially during spring and summer. Because of this high precipitation and the volume of this body of ice, the Blue Glacier contributes a significant amount of water to the Hoh River via Glacier Creek. The Hoh River eventually discharges in the Pacific Ocean after flowing down 34 mi (55 km) through temperate rain forest in Olympic National Park.

== See also ==
- List of glaciers in the United States
- Edward LaChapelle
