= Mount Olympus (Washington) =

Mountain in Washington, United States

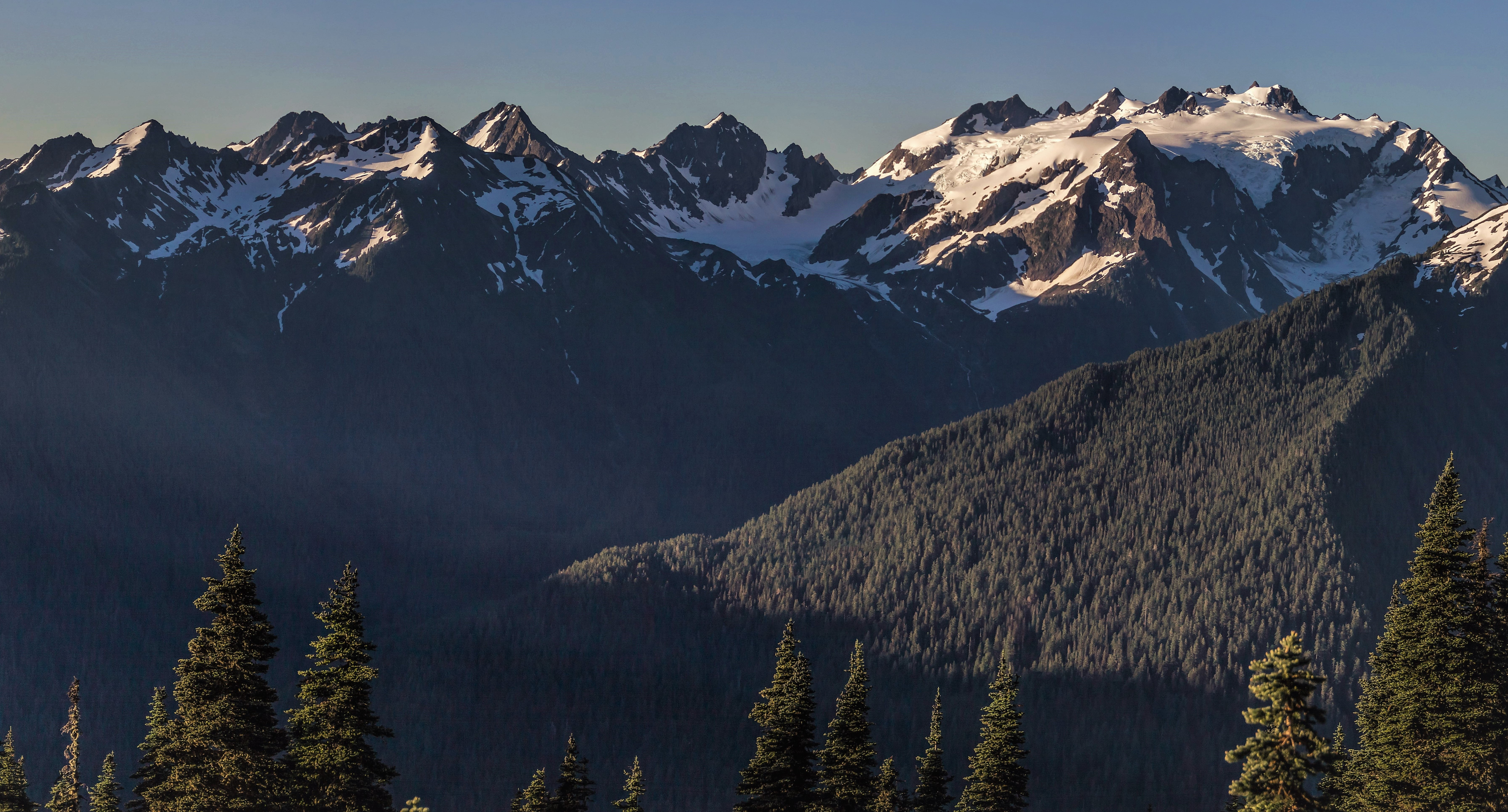

Highest point
- Elevation: 7,980 ft (2,430 m) NAVD 88
- Prominence: 7,838 ft (2,389 m)
- Listing: North America prominent peak 45th; North America isolated peaks 117th
- Coordinates: 47°48′05″N 123°42′39″W

Geography
- Location within Washington (state)
- Location: Olympic National Park, Jefferson County, Washington, US
- Parent range: Olympic Mountains
- Topo map: USGS Mount Olympus

Geology
- Rock age: Eocene
- Mountain type(s): Shale and sandstone

Climbing
- First ascent: 1907 by L.A. Nelson and party
- Easiest route: Glacier Climb

Mount Olympus, at 7,980 feet (2,430 m), is the tallest and most prominent mountain in the Olympic Mountains of the U.S. state of Washington. Located on the Olympic Peninsula, it is also a central feature of Olympic National Park. Mount Olympus is the highest summit of the Olympic Mountains; however, peaks such as Mount Constance and The Brothers, on the eastern margin of the range, are better known, being visible from the Seattle metropolitan area.

== Description ==
With notable local relief, Mount Olympus ascends over 2,100 m (6,900 ft) from the 293 m (961 ft) elevation confluence of the Hoh River with Glacier Creek in only 8.8 km (5.5 mi). Mount Olympus has 2,386 m (7,828 ft) of prominence, ranking 5th in the state of Washington.

Due to heavy winter snowfalls, Mount Olympus supports large glaciers, despite its modest elevation and relatively low latitude. These glaciers include Blue, Hoh, Humes, Jeffers, Hubert, Black Glacier, and White, the longest of which is the Hoh Glacier at 3.06 miles (4.93 km). The largest is Blue with a volume of 0.14 cubic miles (0.57 km^{3}) and area of 2.05 square miles (5.31 km^{2}). As with most temperate latitude glaciers, these have all been shrinking in area and volume, and shortening in recent decades.

== History ==
According to Edmond S. Meany (1923), Origin of Washington geographic names, citing Joseph A. Costello (1895), The Siwash, their life, legends and tales, the Duwamish used the name Sunh-a-do for the Olympian Mountains (or Coast Range in Costello 1895); besides its unclear origin, some references misuse this name for the Native American name of the mountain. Spanish explorer Juan Pérez named the mountain Cerro Nevado de Santa Rosalía ("Snowy Peak of Saint Rosalia") in 1774. This is said to be the first time a European named a geographic feature in what is now Washington state. On July 4, 1788, British explorer John Meares gave the mountain its present name.

In 1890 an expedition, led by US Army officer Joseph P. O'Neil, reached the summit, of what is today presumed to have been the southern peak.

On March 2, 1909, Mount Olympus National Monument was proclaimed by President Theodore Roosevelt. On June 28, 1938, it was designated a national park by President Franklin D. Roosevelt. In 1976 the Olympic National Park became an International Biosphere Reserve. In 1981 it was designated a World Heritage Site. In 1988 Congress designated 95% of the park as the Olympic Wilderness.

== Climate ==
The peak of Mount Olympus has a tundra climate (ET) with extremely heavy precipitation from October to April and heavy precipitation from May to September. A large part of this precipitation falls as snow. The west peak is the wettest place in mainland USA.

Climate data for Mount Olympus 47.7997 N, 123.7080 W, Elevation: 7,448 ft (2,270 m) (1991–2020 normals)
Month	Jan	Feb	Mar	Apr	May	Jun	Jul	Aug	Sep	Oct	Nov	Dec	Year
Mean daily maximum °F (°C)	29.1 (−1.6)	28.6 (−1.9)	28.7 (−1.8)	32.6 (0.3)	40.8 (4.9)	46.7 (8.2)	56.5 (13.6)	57.0 (13.9)	52.5 (11.4)	42.5 (5.8)	31.7 (−0.2)	27.6 (−2.4)	39.5 (4.2)
Daily mean °F (°C)	24.6 (−4.1)	22.8 (−5.1)	22.2 (−5.4)	25.2 (−3.8)	32.6 (0.3)	37.9 (3.3)	46.6 (8.1)	47.3 (8.5)	43.2 (6.2)	34.9 (1.6)	26.6 (−3.0)	23.2 (−4.9)	32.3 (0.1)
Mean daily minimum °F (°C)	20.0 (−6.7)	17.0 (−8.3)	15.8 (−9.0)	17.7 (−7.9)	24.3 (−4.3)	29.1 (−1.6)	36.6 (2.6)	37.5 (3.1)	34.0 (1.1)	27.4 (−2.6)	21.6 (−5.8)	18.8 (−7.3)	25.0 (−3.9)
Average precipitation inches (mm)	27.23 (692)	28.53 (725)	28.75 (730)	13.32 (338)	12.58 (320)	8.99 (228)	3.63 (92)	6.59 (167)	10.95 (278)	16.12 (409)	49.13 (1,248)	26.46 (672)	232.28 (5,899)
Source: PRISM Climate Group

Climate data for Mt Olympus west peak
Month	Jan	Feb	Mar	Apr	May	Jun	Jul	Aug	Sep	Oct	Nov	Dec	Year
Mean daily maximum °F (°C)	28.6 (−1.9)	30.0 (−1.1)	32.6 (0.3)	37.7 (3.2)	43.4 (6.3)	48.8 (9.3)	56.1 (13.4)	57.5 (14.2)	52.9 (11.6)	41.8 (5.4)	32.7 (0.4)	28.4 (−2.0)	40.9 (4.9)
Daily mean °F (°C)	24.0 (−4.4)	24.5 (−4.2)	25.4 (−3.7)	29.5 (−1.4)	35.1 (1.7)	41.0 (5.0)	47.6 (8.7)	48.6 (9.2)	44.6 (7.0)	35.3 (1.8)	27.6 (−2.4)	23.6 (−4.7)	33.9 (1.1)
Mean daily minimum °F (°C)	19.4 (−7.0)	19.1 (−7.2)	18.2 (−7.7)	21.3 (−5.9)	26.7 (−2.9)	33.2 (0.7)	39.0 (3.9)	39.6 (4.2)	36.3 (2.4)	28.9 (−1.7)	22.6 (−5.2)	18.9 (−7.3)	26.9 (−2.8)
Average precipitation inches (mm)	41.66 (1,058)	26.00 (660)	27.73 (704)	21.70 (551)	11.16 (283)	9.97 (253)	4.72 (120)	5.81 (148)	8.82 (224)	22.81 (579)	39.49 (1,003)	39.25 (997)	259.12 (6,580)

== See also ==
- List of mountain peaks of North America
  - List of mountain peaks of the United States
    - List of Ultras of the United States
    - List of highest points in Washington by county
