= Mount Noyes (Washington) =

Mountain in Washington (state), United States

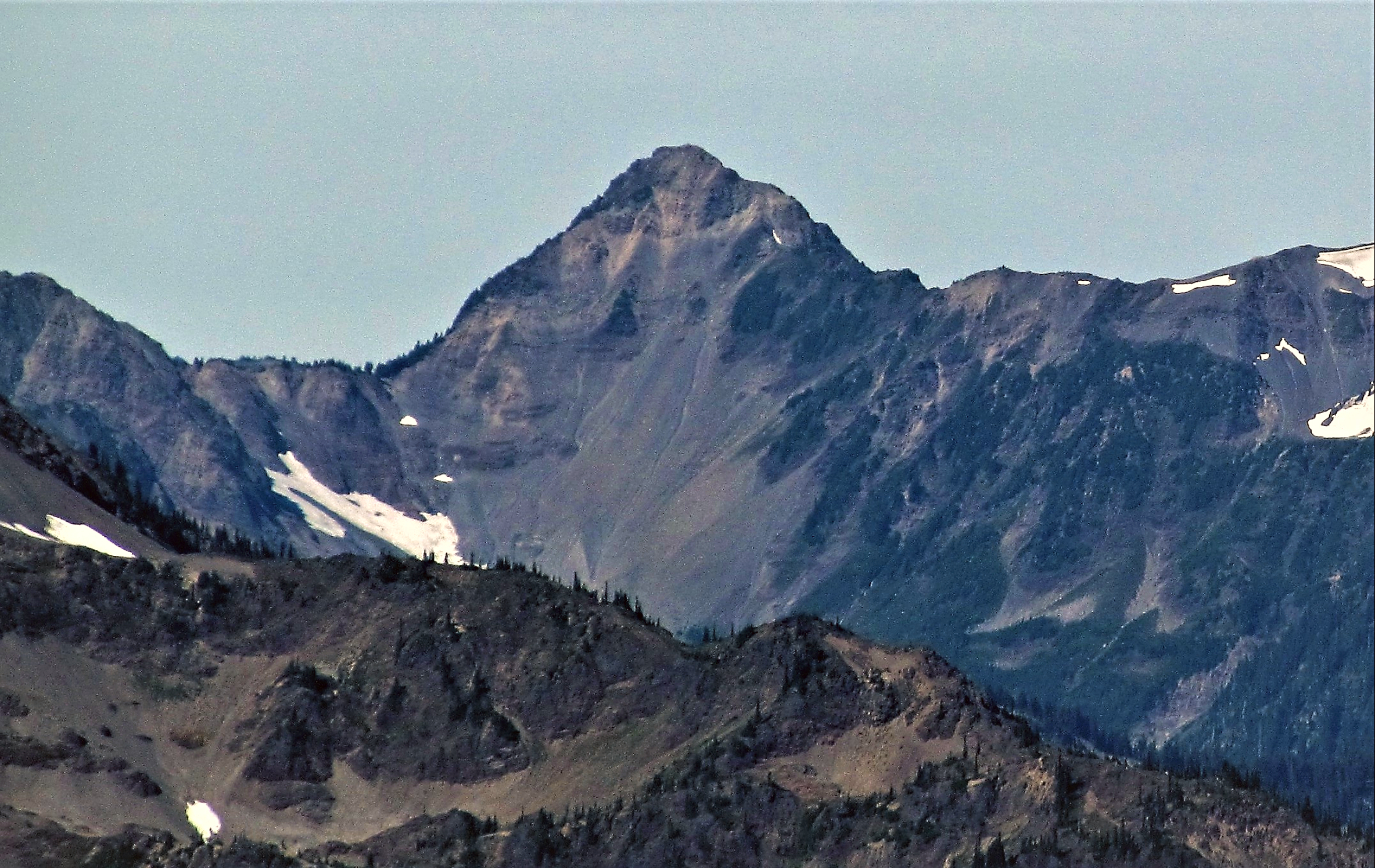
- East aspect

Highest point
- Elevation: 6,173 ft (1,882 m)
- Prominence: 373 ft (114 m)
- Parent peak: Mount Meany (6,695 ft)
- Isolation: 0.78 mi (1.26 km)
- Coordinates: 47°44′23″N 123°35′41″W

Geography
- Location within Washington (state) Location within the United States
- Country: United States
- State: Washington
- County: Jefferson
- Protected area: Olympic National Park
- Parent range: Olympic Mountains
- Topo map: USGS Mount Christie

Geology
- Rock age: Eocene

Climbing
- First ascent: May 1907 by Asahel Curtis
- Easiest route: class 2+ via Noyes-Meany col

Mount Noyes is a 6,173-foot (1,882 m) mountain summit located deep within Olympic National Park in Jefferson County of Washington state. Part of the Olympic Mountains, Mount Noyes is situated seven miles southeast of Mount Olympus, and set within the Daniel J. Evans Wilderness. The nearest higher neighbor is Mount Meany, 0.6 miles (0.97 km) to the north, and Mount Seattle rises one mile to the southeast. Noyes is a major triple divide point with precipitation runoff from the mountain draining east into the headwaters of the Elwha River, west into headwaters of Saghalie Creek which is a tributary of the Queets River, and south into headwaters of Seattle Creek which is a tributary of the Quinault River. Topographic relief is significant as the east, west, and south aspects of the peak each rise 2,200 feet (670 m) in approximately one mile.

== History ==
The mountain was named during the 1889-90 Seattle Press Expedition to honor Crosby Stuart Noyes (1825–1908), the publisher of the Washington Evening Star. It is possible that the mountain may have been climbed by USGS mappers Arthur Dodwell and Theodore Rixon between 1898 and 1900. The first documented ascent of the summit was made in 1907 by Asahel Curtis and Grant Humes who were reconnoitering for The Mountaineers first ascent attempt at Mount Olympus. Three scramble routes to the summit have been established: via the Noyes-Meany col, the Seattle-Noyes col, and via Low Divide.

== Climate ==
Based on the Köppen climate classification, Mount Noyes is located in the marine west coast climate zone of western North America. Most weather fronts originate in the Pacific Ocean, and travel northeast toward the Olympic Mountains. As fronts approach, they are forced upward by the peaks of the Olympic Range, causing them to drop their moisture in the form of rain or snowfall (Orographic lift). As a result, the Olympics experience high precipitation, especially during the winter months. During winter months, weather is usually cloudy, but, due to high pressure systems over the Pacific Ocean that intensify during summer months, there is often little or no cloud cover during the summer. The months June through August offer the most favorable weather for viewing or climbing this mountain.

== Geology ==
The Olympic Mountains are composed of obducted clastic wedge material and oceanic crust, primarily Eocene sandstone, turbidite, and basaltic oceanic crust. The mountains were sculpted during the Pleistocene era by erosion and glaciers advancing and retreating multiple times.

== See also ==
- Olympic Mountains
- Geology of the Pacific Northwest
