= Mount Meany =

Mountain in Washington (state), United States

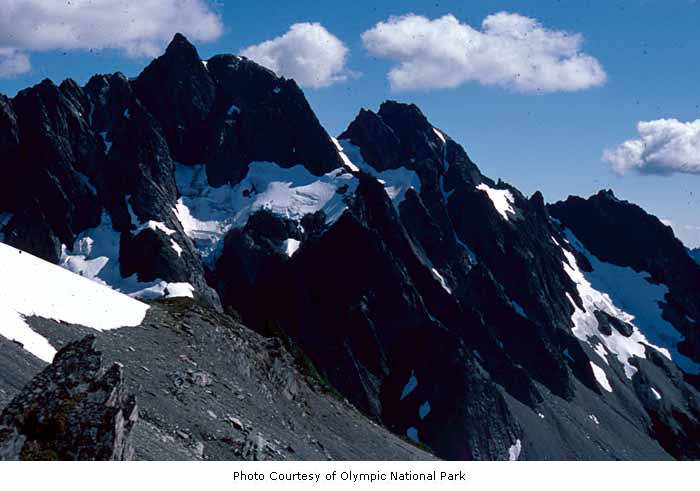

Highest point
- Elevation: 6,695 ft (2,041 m)
- Prominence: 1,895 ft (578 m)
- Isolation: 4.07 mi (6.55 km)
- Coordinates: 47°45′03″N 123°35′52″W

Geography
- Location within Washington (state) Location within the United States
- Country: United States
- State: Washington
- County: Jefferson
- Protected area: Olympic National Park
- Parent range: Olympic Mountains
- Topo map: USGS Mount Queets

Geology
- Rock age: Eocene
- Rock type: pillow basalt

Climbing
- First ascent: 1907 Asahel Curtis, Lorenz Nelson, Peter McGregor
- Easiest route: Scrambling YDS 3

Mount Meany is a prominent 6,695-foot (2,041-metre) mountain summit located deep within Olympic National Park in Jefferson County of Washington state. With a good eye and clear weather, the top of the mountain can be seen from the visitor center at Hurricane Ridge. The nearest neighbor is Mount Noyes less than one mile to the south, and the nearest higher peak is Circe (6,847 ft) on Mount Olympus, 4.07 mi (6.55 km) to the northwest. There are scrambling routes on the east side, via Noyes-Meany col, and via the ridge from Mount Queets. Due to heavy winter snowfalls, Mount Meany supports several small glaciers on its north and east slopes, despite its modest elevation. Precipitation runoff from the mountain drains into the headwaters of both the Elwha and Queets Rivers.

== History ==
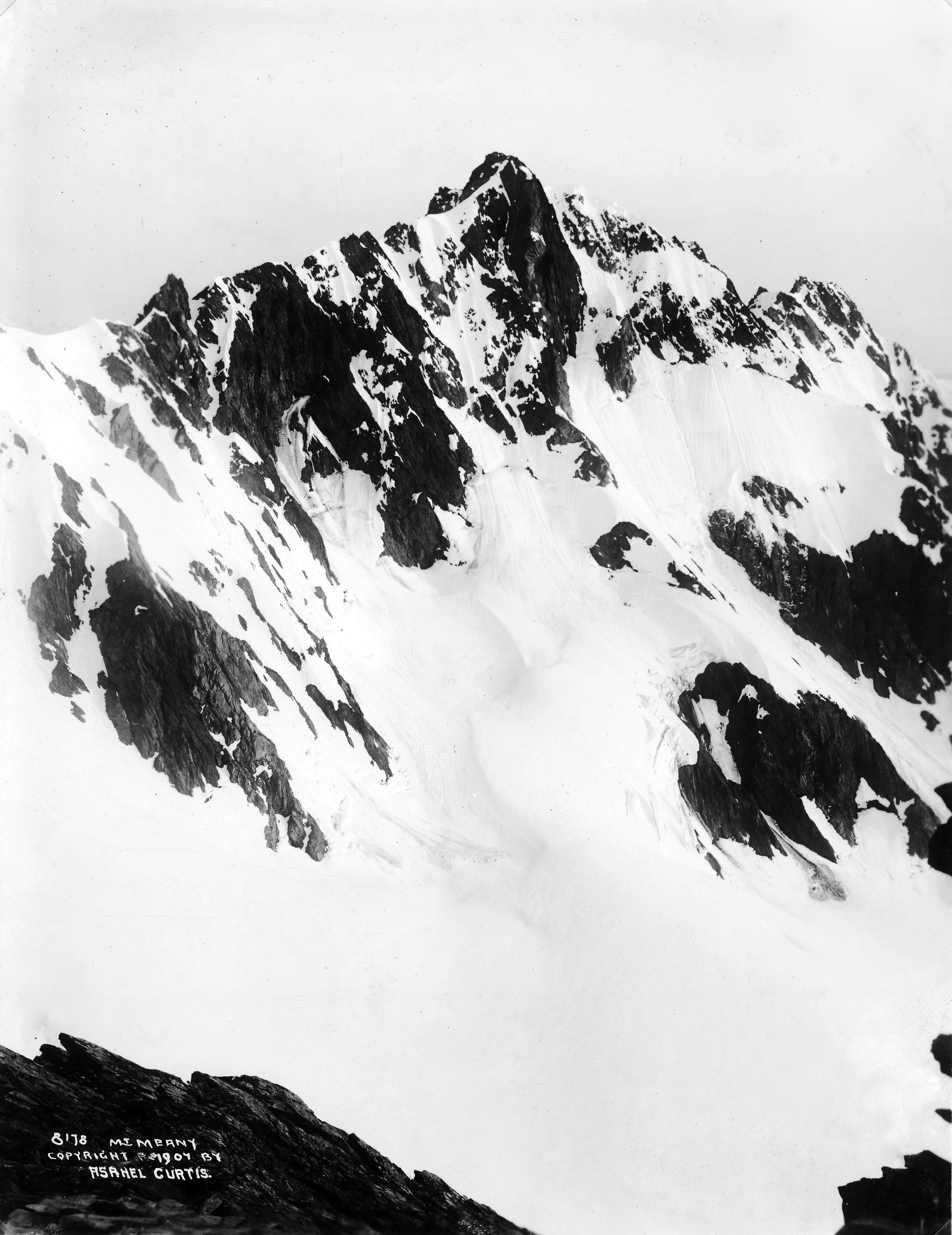
Mt. Meany, 1907

The present day Mt. Meany - Mt. Queets area was referred to as Mt. Mesachie on the 1896 Gilman National Geographic Map. The word mesachie is from the Chinook Jargon and means wicked.

The mountain was named during the 1889-90 Seattle Press Expedition to honor Edmond S. Meany (1862–1935), at that time an employee of the Seattle Press who arranged the meeting between the expedition's newspaper sponsor, with Canadian James Halbold Christie, the leader of group of five which ascended the Elwha River and descended the North Fork Quinault River. Meany later became a renowned scholar and professor at the University of Washington, a Washington state legislator, and also a mountain climber who served as president of The Mountaineers.

The first ascent of the mountain was made August 8, 1907, by Asahel Curtis, Lorenz Nelson, and Peter McGregor.

== Climate ==
Based on the Köppen climate classification, Mount Meany is located in the marine west coast climate zone of western North America. Weather fronts originating in the Pacific Ocean travel northeast toward the Olympic Mountains. As fronts approach, they are forced upward by the peaks (orographic lift), causing them to drop their moisture in the form of rain or snow. As a result, the Olympics experience high precipitation, especially during the winter months in the form of snowfall. Because of maritime influence, snow tends to be wet and heavy, resulting in avalanche danger. During winter months weather is usually cloudy, but due to high pressure systems over the Pacific Ocean that intensify during summer months, there is often little or no cloud cover during the summer. The months of July through September offer the most favorable weather for climbing.

== Geology ==
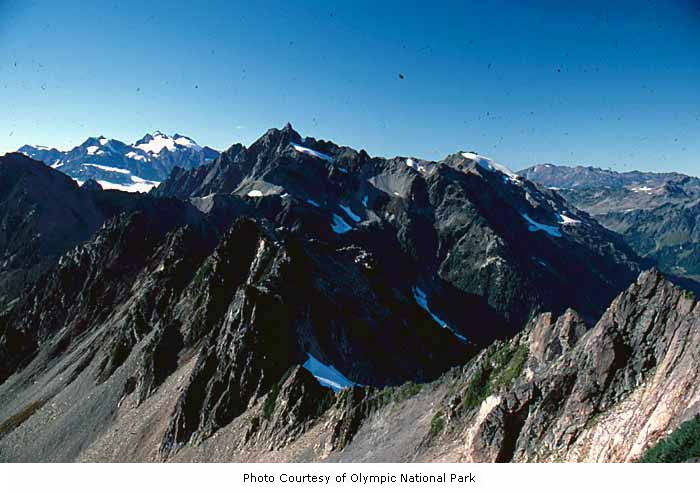
Mt. Meany seen from Mount Seattle

The Olympic Mountains are composed of obducted clastic wedge material and oceanic crust, primarily Eocene sandstone, turbidite, and basaltic oceanic crust. The mountains were sculpted during the Pleistocene era by erosion and glaciers advancing and retreating multiple times.

== See also ==
- Geology of the Pacific Northwest
