= Mount Seattle (Washington) =

Mountain in Washington (state), United States

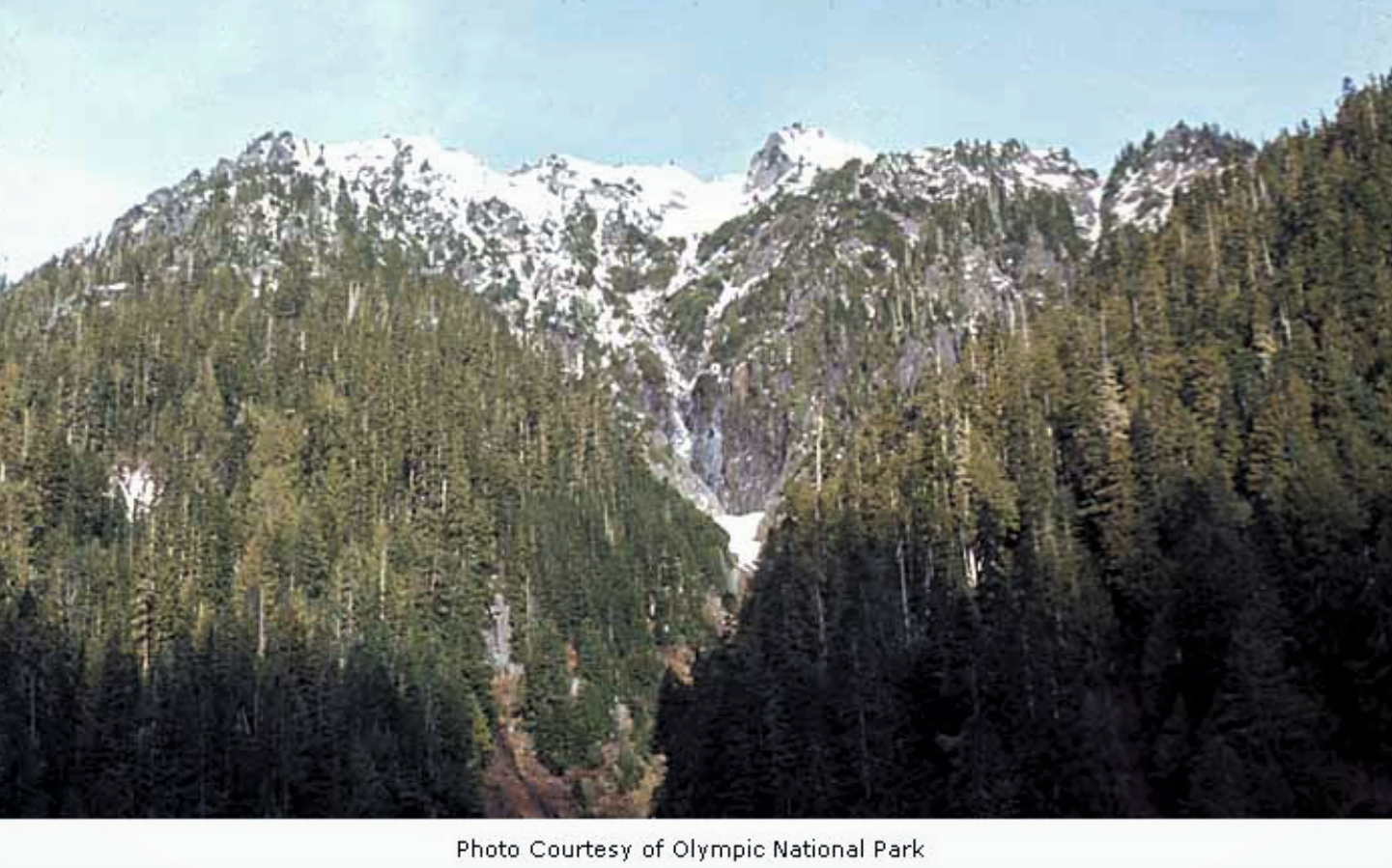
- East aspect

Highest point
- Elevation: 6,246 ft (1,904 m)
- Prominence: 726 ft (221 m)
- Parent peak: Mount Meany (6,695 ft)
- Isolation: 1.65 mi (2.66 km)
- Coordinates: 47°43′52″N 123°34′39″W

Geography
- Location within Washington (state) Location within the United States
- Country: United States
- State: Washington
- County: Jefferson
- Protected area: Olympic National Park
- Parent range: Olympic Mountains
- Topo map: USGS Mount Christie

Geology
- Rock age: Eocene

Climbing
- First ascent: 1907 by Asahel Curtis
- Easiest route: class 3 scrambling

Mount Seattle is a 6,246-foot (1,904-metre) mountain summit deep within Olympic National Park in Jefferson County of Washington state. Part of the Olympic Mountains, Mount Seattle is situated 7.5 miles southeast of Mount Olympus, and set within the Quinault Rainforest and Daniel J. Evans Wilderness. The nearest higher neighbor is Mount Meany, 1.65 miles (2.66 km) to the north-northwest, and Mount Noyes rises one mile to the northwest. Precipitation runoff from the mountain drains north into headwaters of the Elwha River, and south into tributaries of the Quinault River. Topographic relief is significant as the northeast aspect of the peak rises over 3,800 feet (1,200 m) above the Elwha valley in approximately 1.5-mile. Low Divide forms the saddle between Mt. Seattle and Mount Christie.

== History ==
The mountain was named on April 29, 1890, by James Halbold Christie, leader of the 1889–90 Seattle Press Expedition, and Charles Adams Barnes, the expedition's topographer. Christie was sponsored by the Seattle newspaper Press, and named the mountain in honor of the city of Seattle. Observations from Mount Seattle enabled Barnes to finally complete his map of the Olympic Mountains.

The first documented ascent of the summit was made in 1907 by Asahel Curtis, Grant Humes, and Lorenz Nelson who were reconnoitering for The Mountaineers first ascent attempt at Mount Olympus. Three scramble routes to the summit have been established: via Noyes Basin, via Seattle Creek Basin, and via Low Divide.

== Climate ==
Based on the Köppen climate classification, Mount Seattle is located in the marine west coast climate zone of western North America. Weather fronts originating in the Pacific Ocean travel northeast toward the Olympic Mountains. As fronts approach, they are forced upward by the peaks (orographic lift), causing them to drop their moisture in the form of rain or snow. As a result, the Olympics experience high precipitation, especially during the winter months in the form of snowfall. Because of maritime influence, snow tends to be wet and heavy, resulting in avalanche danger. During winter months weather is usually cloudy, but due to high pressure systems over the Pacific Ocean that intensify during summer months, there is often little or no cloud cover during the summer. The months June through August offer the most favorable weather for viewing or climbing this mountain.

== Geology ==
The Olympic Mountains are composed of obducted clastic wedge material and oceanic crust, primarily Eocene sandstone, turbidite, and basaltic oceanic crust. The mountains were sculpted during the Pleistocene era by erosion and glaciers advancing and retreating multiple times.

== Gallery ==
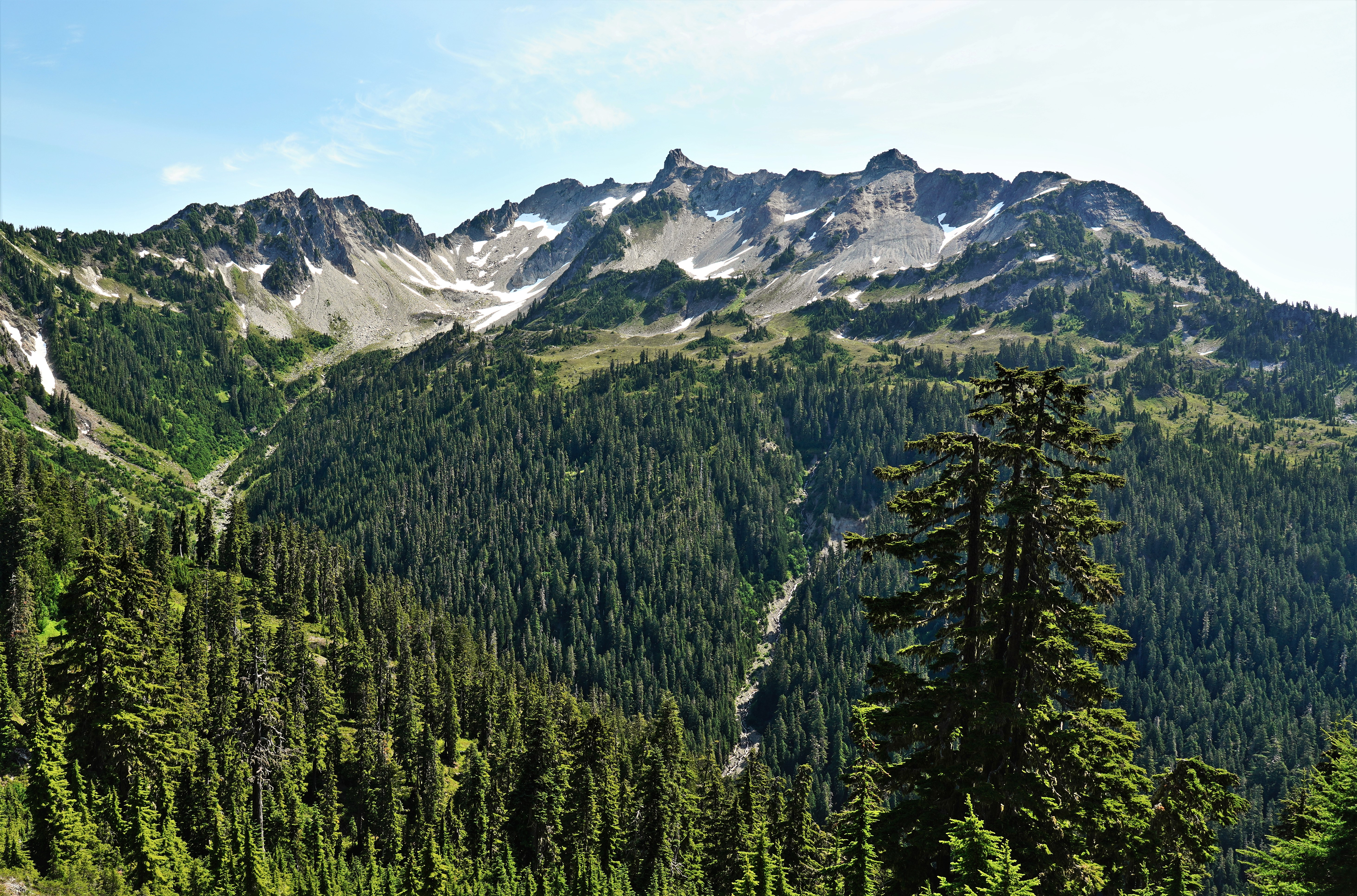
West aspect

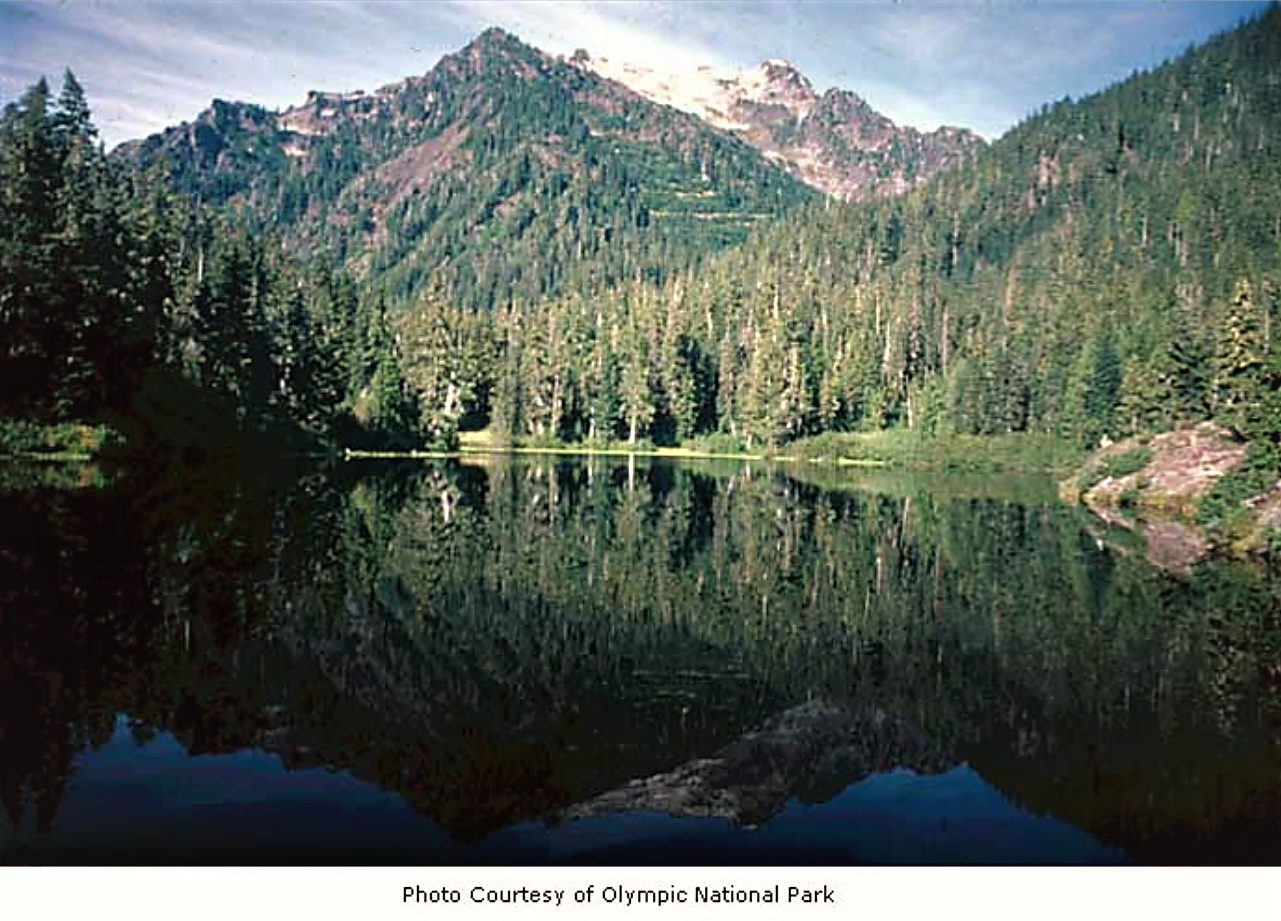
East aspect, reflected in Lake Margaret

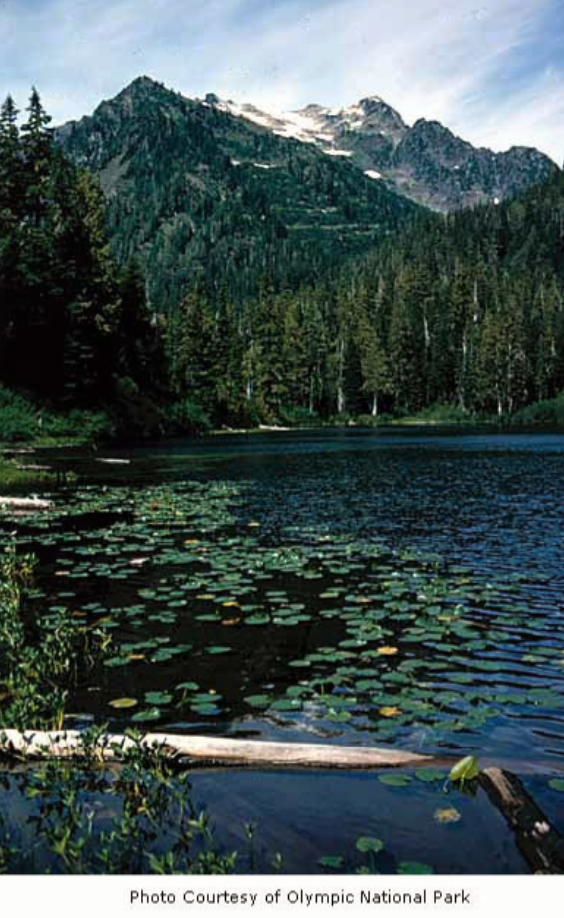
East aspect, from Lake Margaret

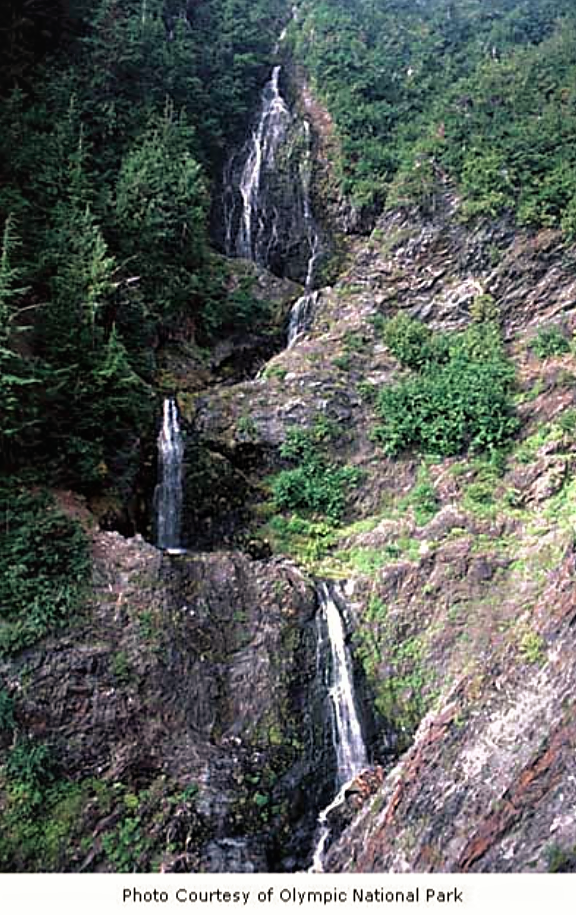
Waterfalls on Mount Seattle

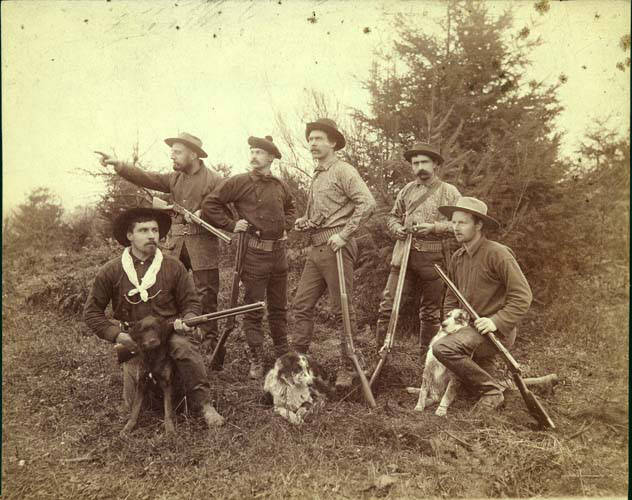
Seattle Press expedition members with Christie and Barnes in the center

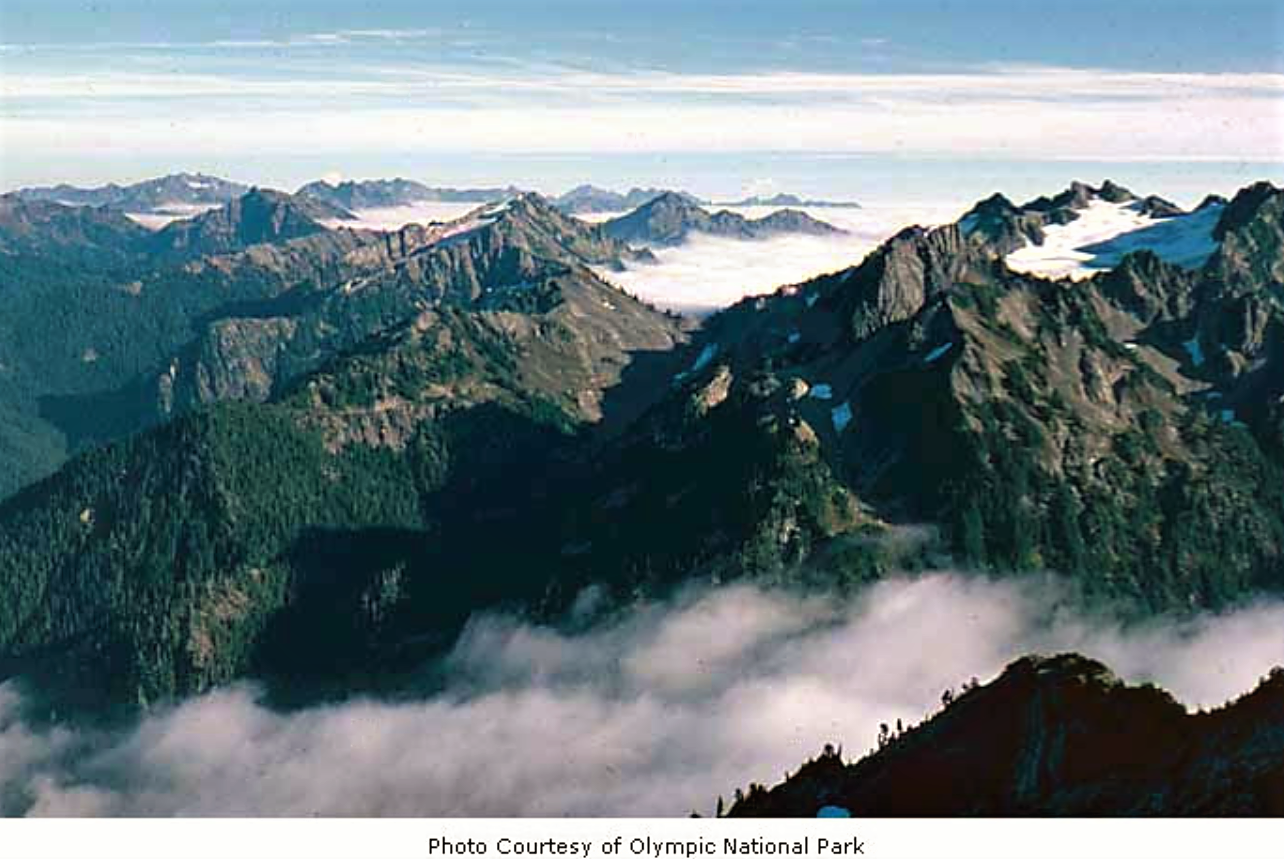
The view from Mt. Seattle, with Mt. Christie to right.

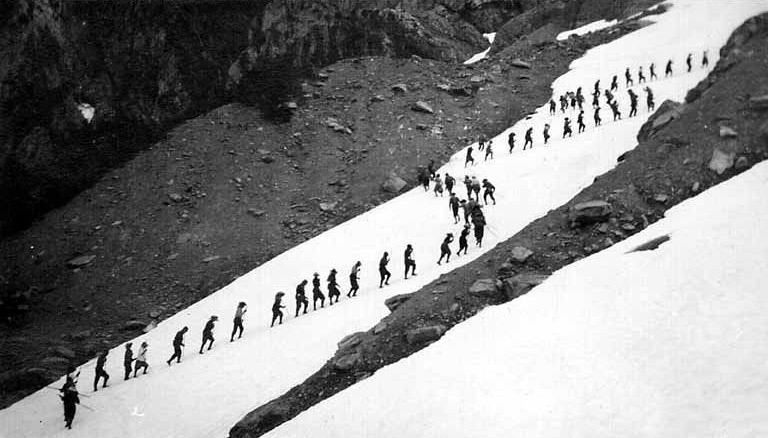
Men and women hiking up Mount Seattle, August 7, 1913

== See also ==
- Olympic Mountains
- Geology of the Pacific Northwest
