= Queets, Washington =

- Census-designated place
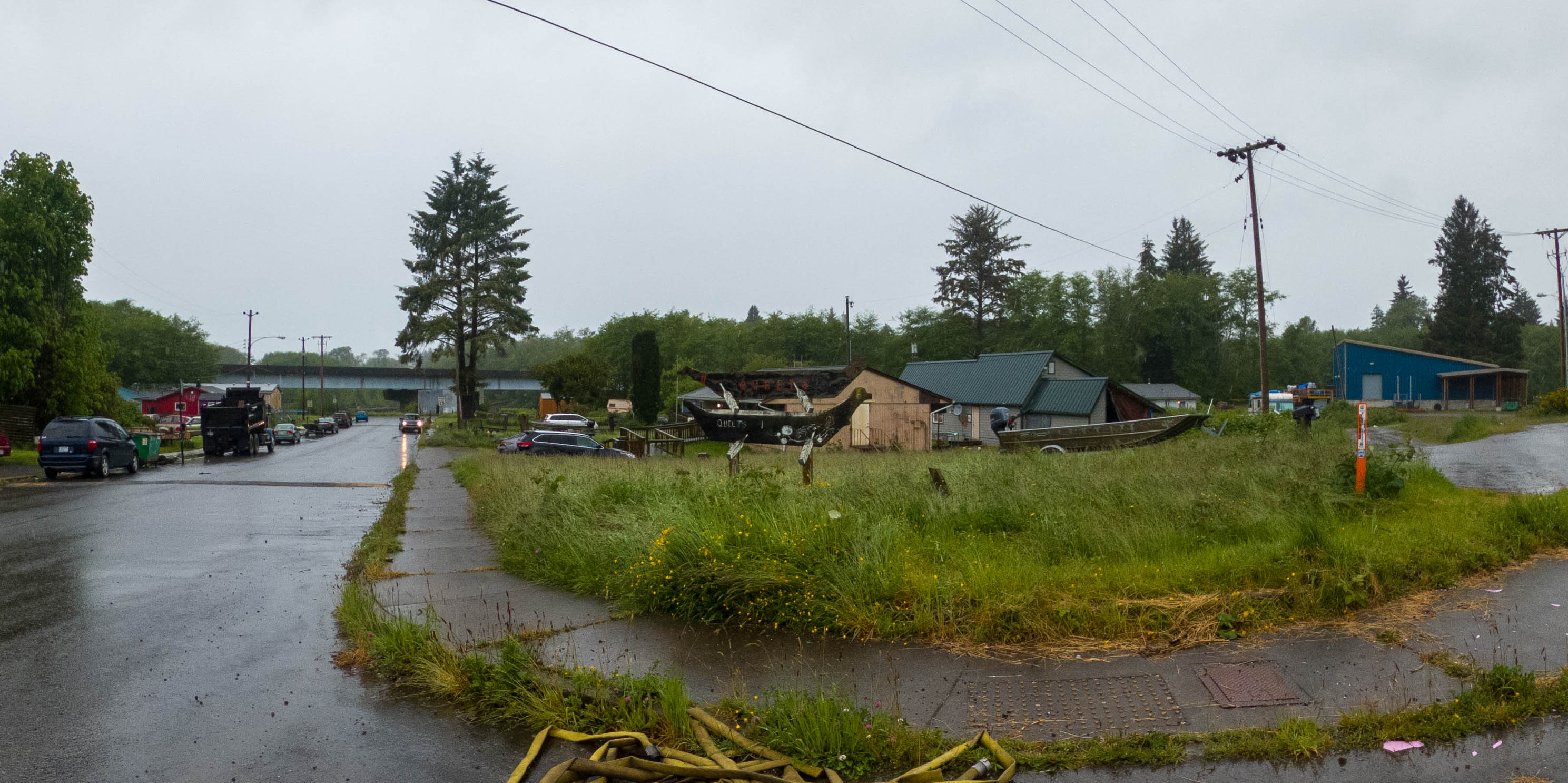
- An intersection in Queets

- Location within Washington (state) Location within the United States
- Coordinates: 47°31′54″N 124°20′18″W
- Country: United States
- State: Washington
- Counties: Grays Harbor, Jefferson

Area
  - Total: 1.4 sq mi (3.7 km^{2})
  - Land: 1.4 sq mi (3.6 km^{2})
  - Water: 0 sq mi (0.0 km^{2})
- Elevation: 92 ft (28 m)

Population (2020)
  - Total: 136
  - Density: 98/sq mi (38/km^{2})
- Time zone: UTC-8 (Pacific (PST))
  - Summer (DST): UTC-7 (PDT)
- ZIP Code: 98331
- FIPS code: 53-56905
- GNIS feature ID: 2585025

Queets is an unincorporated community and census-designated place (CDP) in Grays Harbor and Jefferson counties, Washington, United States. The population was 136 at the 2020 census, down from 174 at the 2010 census. The primary residents of the community are Native Americans of the Quinault Indian Nation.

== Etymology ==
Queets gets its name from the Queets River which it borders. According to William Bright The Queets River gets its name from the Quinault word q'ʷícx̣ʷ.

== History ==
The post office at Queets was established July 13, 1880, and discontinued July 31, 1934, with mail being sent to Clearwater, approximately 8 miles (13 km) away.

== Geography ==
The community is near the coast of the Pacific Ocean along the Queets River at the northern edge of the Quinault Indian Reservation. Queets consists of several homes, a store, gas station, fisheries, daycare, Head Start, and a remote office for the Quinault Nation. Other local attractions include the Pacific beach hiking trails, Olympic National Park, and Olympic National Forest.

U.S. Route 101 passes through Queets, crossing the Queets River at the northern edge of the community. US 101 leads north 5 miles (8 km) to Kalaloch Beach and 39 miles (63 km) to Forks, site of the nearest airport. Southbound US 101 leads east 25 miles (40 km) to Amanda Park and southeast 68 miles (109 km) to Aberdeen.

According to the United States Census Bureau, the Queets CDP has a total area of 1.4 square miles (3.7 km^{2}), of which 1.4 square miles (3.6 km^{2}) are land and 0.04 square miles (0.1 km^{2}), or 3.45%, are water.

== Demographics ==
Historical population
Census	Pop.	Note	%±
2010	174		—
2020	136		−21.8%
U.S. Decennial Census; 2000 2010

Queets first appeared as a census designated place in the 2010 U.S. census.

=== Racial and ethnic composition ===
Queets CDP, Washington – Racial and ethnic composition Note: the US Census treats Hispanic/Latino as an ethnic category. This table excludes Latinos from the racial categories and assigns them to a separate category. Hispanics/Latinos may be of any race.
Race / Ethnicity (NH = Non-Hispanic)	Pop 2010	Pop 2020	% 2010	% 2020
White alone (NH)	5	4	2.87%	2.94%
Black or African American alone (NH)	1	1	0.57%	0.74%
Native American or Alaska Native alone (NH)	159	117	91.38%	86.03%
Asian alone (NH)	0	0	0.00%	0.00%
Native Hawaiian or Pacific Islander alone (NH)	1	0	0.57%	0.00%
Other race alone (NH)	0	0	0.00%	0.00%
Mixed race or Multiracial (NH)	8	9	4.60%	6.62%
Hispanic or Latino (any race)	0	5	0.00%	3.68%
Total	174	136	100.00%	100.00%

=== 2010 census ===
At the 2010 census, more than 95% of the population identified their race as American Indian.

== Religion ==
The only place of worship in Queets is the Queets Indian Shaker Church.
