= Clearwater River (Queets River tributary) =

- Location of the mouth of the Clearwater River in Washington

Location
- Country: United States
- State: Washington
- County: Jefferson

Physical characteristics
- Source: Olympic Mountains
  - coordinates: 47°43′56″N 123°54′11″W
- Mouth: Queets River
  - coordinates: 47°32′46″N 124°17′31″W
  - elevation: 46 ft (14 m)
- Length: 39 mi (63 km)
- Basin size: 61.5 sq mi (159 km^{2})

Basin features
- Tributaries
  - left: Solleks River
  - right: Snahapish River

The Clearwater River is a river situated on the Olympic Peninsula in Washington. It is the main tributary of the Queets River. The Clearwater River is 39 miles (63 km) long. Its drainage basin is 61.5 square miles (159 km^{2}) in area. The Clearwater's main tributaries are the Snahapish River and the Solleks River.

== See also ==
- List of rivers of Washington (state)
