= Queets Glacier =

Glacier in Washington, United States

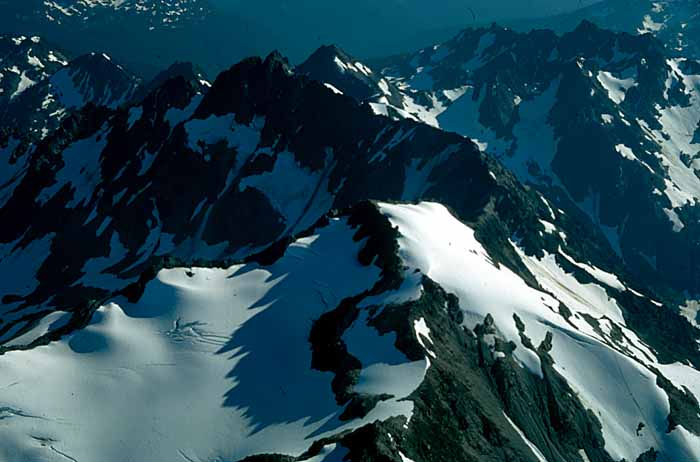
- Queets Glacier on Mount Queets

- Location within Washington (state)
- Type: Mountain glacier
- Location: Mount Queets, Olympic National Park, Jefferson County, Washington, USA
- Coordinates: 47°46′02″N 123°36′03″W
- Length: .60 mi (0.97 km)
- Terminus: Icefall
- Status: Retreating

Queets Glacier is located in the Olympic Mountains in Olympic National Park in the U.S. state of Washington. The glacier lies on the northwest side of Mount Queets at an elevation of about 5,564 feet (1,696 m), the glacier descends northwest, bounded by two arêtes on either side. The ice reaches as low as 5,000 ft (1,500 m) before terminating and giving rise to the headwaters of the Queets River.

== See also ==
- List of glaciers in the United States
