= Mount Octopus =

Mountain in United States of America

- Location within Washington (state)

Highest point
- Elevation: 2,444 ft (745 m) NAVD 88
- Prominence: 1,680 ft (510 m)
- Coordinates: 47°44′56″N 124°10′40″W

Geography
- Location: Jefferson County, Washington, U.S.
- Parent range: Olympic Mountains
- Topo map: USGS Christmas Creek

Mount Octopus is a 2,444-foot (745 m) peak in the western Olympic Mountains foothills, in Jefferson County, Washington a few miles from Olympic Corrections Center. The Snahapish River is at the base of the mountain to its east.

The peak had a fire lookout active from c. 1957 to 1974. It was removed from its tower by Corrections Center inmates in preparation to move it to the Forks Timber Museum, but it burned before being moved.

In September 2000, a repeater radio station was installed at the summit for NOAA Weather Radio. It filled gaps in emergency coverage for communities on the Olympic Peninsula, many of whom had no radio coverage from Puget Sound transmitters, and for oceangoing craft near the Pacific coast of Washington. Its purpose was especially to issue tsunami warnings.
