= Lower Curtis Glacier =

Glacier in the state of Washington

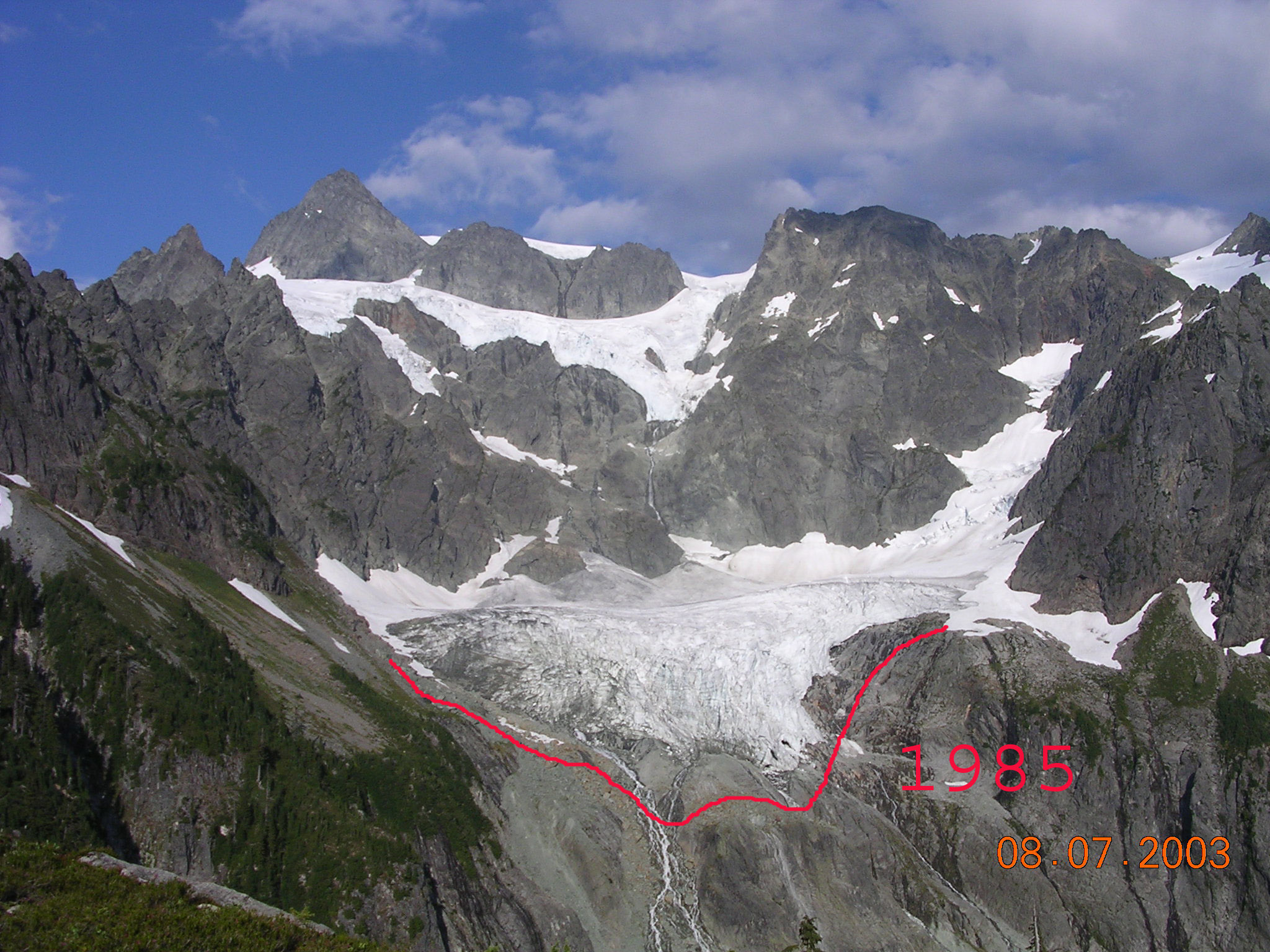
- Lower Curtis Glacier showing glacial retreat documented between 1985 and 2003

- Location within Washington (state)
- Type: Mountain glacier
- Location: North Cascades National Park, Whatcom County, Washington, USA
- Coordinates: 48°49′24″N 121°37′17″W
- Area: .8 km^{2} (0.31 sq mi)
- Terminus: cliffs
- Status: retreating

Lower Curtis Glacier is in North Cascades National Park in the U.S. state of Washington. Named for photographer Asahel Curtis, the glacier is in a cirque on the western slopes of Mount Shuksan.

The glacier is rapidly retreating and has a negative mass balance, meaning that the rate of snow and ice that is falling in the accumulation zone is less than that which is lost each year in the ablation zone. Between 1908 and 1984, the glacier experienced a loss of thickness of 45 meters (147 ft). Between 1984 and 2002, the glacier lost another 6 meters (19 ft) in thickness. Lower Curtis Glacier also lost 28% of its surface area between the end of the Little Ice Age (around 1850) and 1950. Between the years 1951 and 1979, the glacier actually lengthened by 245 meters (800 ft) but has retreated 184 m (600 ft) since 1985, partly due to the tongue of the glacier being on a steep precipice which may have increased the loss of ice at the termini.

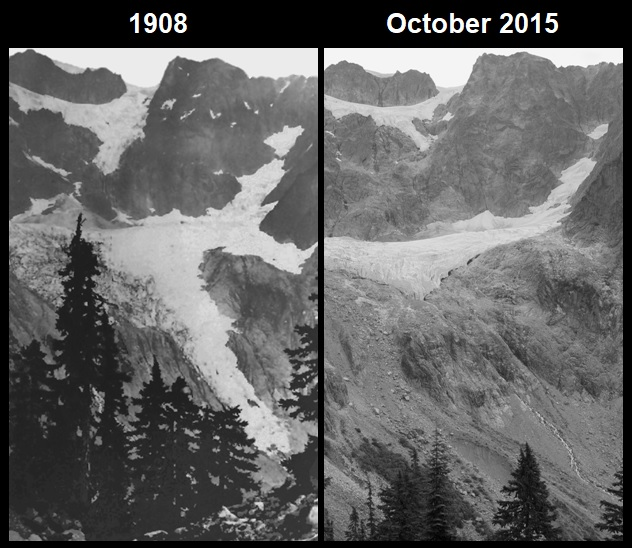

== See also ==
- List of glaciers in the United States
