= Solleks River =

River in Washington, United States

- Mouth of the Solleks River in Washington

Location
- Country: United States
- State: Washington
- Region: Olympic Peninsula
- County: Jefferson

Physical characteristics
- Source: Olympic Mountains
  - location: Olympic Peninsula
  - coordinates: 47°42′50″N 123°54′31″W
  - elevation: 2,710 ft (830 m)
- Mouth: Clearwater River
  - location: Olympic Peninsula
  - coordinates: 47°41′23″N 124°6′24″W
  - elevation: 390 ft (120 m)
- Length: 10.7 mi (17.2 km)
- Basin size: 15.9 sq mi (41 km^{2})

The Solleks River is a river in the U.S. state of Washington. It is a tributary of the Clearwater River, which in turn flows into the Queets River.

The Solleks River is 10.7 miles (17.2 km) long. Its drainage basin is 15.9 square miles (41 km^{2}) in area.

== Course ==
The Solleks River originates in the Olympic Mountains on the Olympic Peninsula, about 5 miles (8.0 km) northeast of the mountain known as Kloochman Rock. It flows west to join the Clearwater River near Upper Clearwater Campground.

== See also ==
- List of rivers in Washington
