= Snahapish River =

- Mouth of the Snahapish River in Washington

Location
- Country: United States
- State: Washington
- Region: Olympic Peninsula
- County: Jefferson

Physical characteristics
- Source: Olympic Mountains
  - location: Olympic Peninsula
  - coordinates: 47°45′41″N 124°8′0″W
  - elevation: 735 ft (224 m)
- Mouth: Clearwater River
  - location: Olympic Peninsula
  - coordinates: 47°39′18″N 124°10′36″W
  - elevation: 270 ft (82 m)
- Length: 10.7 mi (17.2 km)
- Basin size: 20 sq mi (52 km^{2})

The Snahapish River is a river in the U.S. state of Washington. It is a tributary of the Clearwater River, which in turn flows into the Queets River.

The Snahapish River is 10.7 miles (17.2 km) long. Its drainage basin is 20 square miles (52 km^{2}) in area.

== Course ==
The Snahapish River originates in the hilly lands on the west side of the Olympic Mountains on the Olympic Peninsula. Its source is a few miles south of the Hoh River and about a mile east of Mount Octopus. The river flows south through a broad valley. It empties into the Clearwater River near Coppermine Bottom Campground. Clearwater Road follows most of the river's course.

== See also ==
- List of rivers in Washington
