= Mount Queets =

Mountain in Washington (state), United States

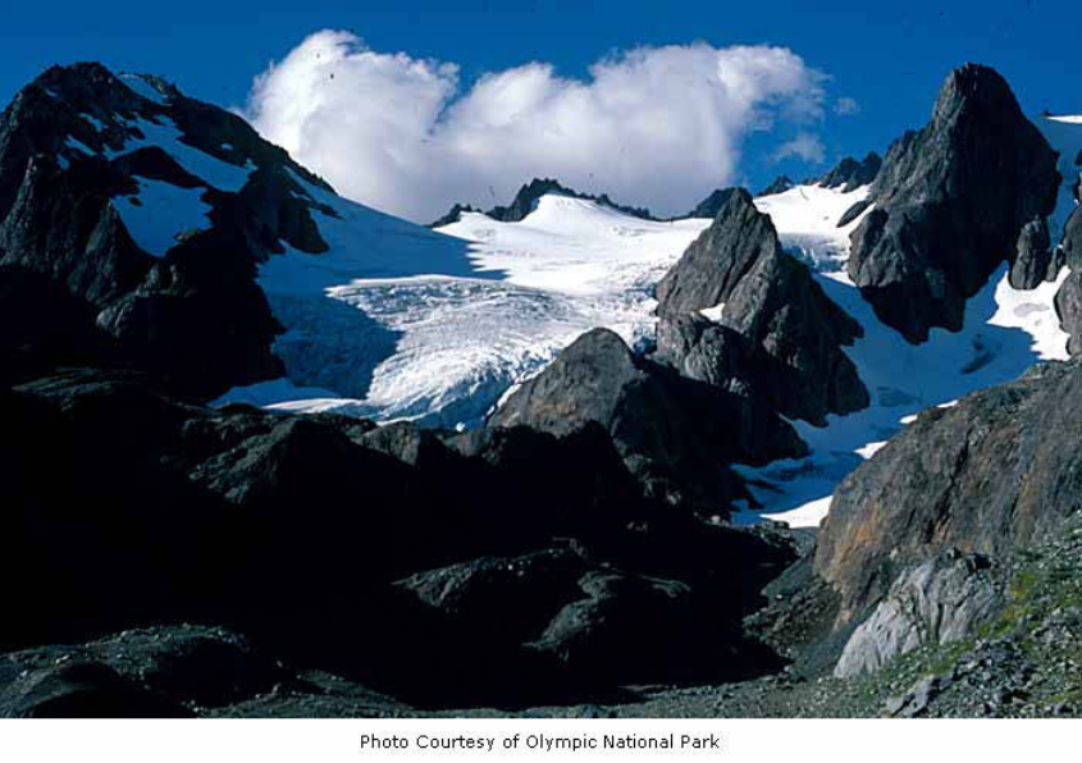

Highest point
- Elevation: 6,476 ft (1,974 m)
- Prominence: 516 ft (157 m)
- Parent peak: Mount Meany
- Isolation: 0.80 mi (1.29 km)
- Coordinates: 47°45′44″N 123°35′43″W

Geography
- Location within Washington (state) Location within the United States
- Country: United States
- State: Washington
- County: Jefferson
- Protected area: Olympic National Park
- Parent range: Olympic Mountains
- Topo map: USGS Mount Queets

Geology
- Rock age: Eocene
- Rock type: basalt

Climbing
- First ascent: 1890 Harry Fisher (aka James B. Hanmore), Nelson Linsley
- Easiest route: Scrambling YDS 2 via North Ridge

Mount Queets is a 6,476-foot (1,974-metre) mountain summit located deep within Olympic National Park in Jefferson County of Washington state, United States. With a good eye and clear weather, the top of the mountain can be seen from the visitor center at Hurricane Ridge. The nearest higher peak is Mount Meany (6,695 ft), 0.8 mi (1.3 km) to the south. Due to heavy winter snowfalls, Mount Queets supports the Queets Glacier in a cirque on its north slope, despite its modest elevation. Precipitation runoff from the mountain drains into the headwaters of both the Elwha River and Queets River. There are scrambling routes ranging from class YDS 2 via the North Ridge, class 3 via the ridge from Mt. Meany, and class 4 via the Queets Glacier.

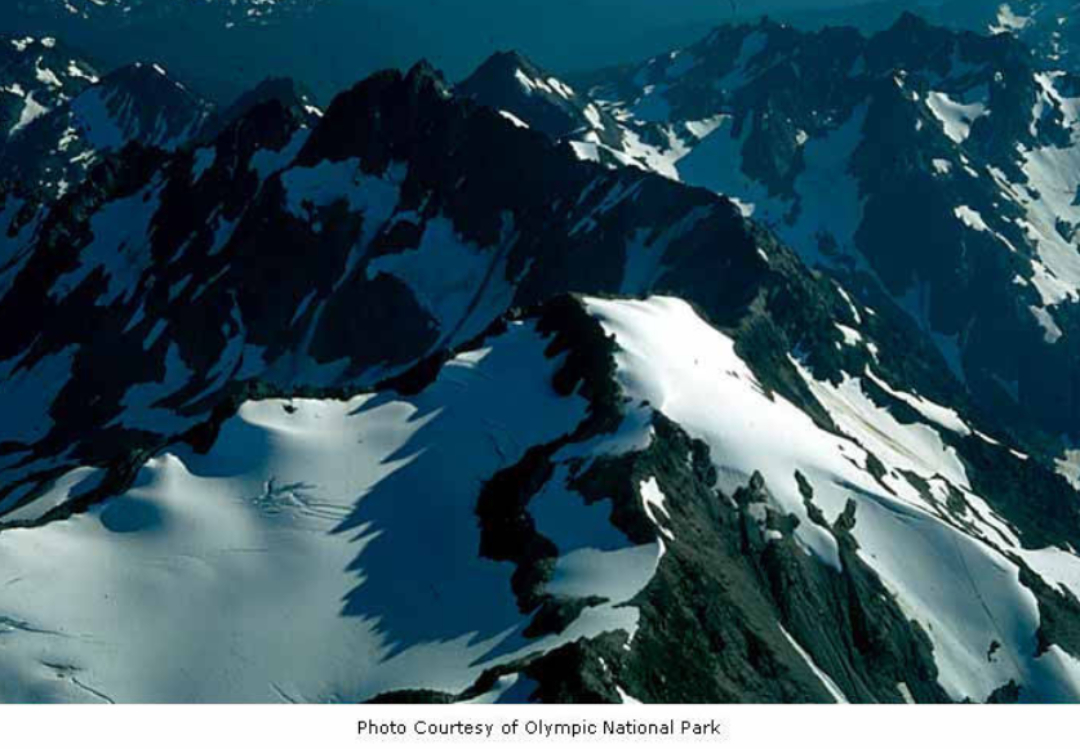
Summit of Mount Queets with Mt. Meany in background

== History ==
The present-day Mt. Meany - Mt. Queets area was referred to as Mt. Mesachie on the 1896 Gilman National Geographic Map. The word mesachie is from Chinook Jargon and means wicked.

The mountain was dubbed "Mt. Hearst" during the 1889-90 Seattle Press Expedition to honor William Randolph Hearst, owner of the San Francisco Examiner, but Mount Queets is the officially accepted name today. The name "Queets" first appeared on the Surveyor General's map of Washington Territory referring to the Queets River, then was later applied to the glacier on the mountain which is the primary source of the river. The word "Queets" is a derivation of the name of the Quai'tso (Queets) tribe.

The first ascent of the mountain was made in 1890 by Harry Fisher (aka James B. Hanmore) and Nelson Linsley during the second O’Neil Expedition.

== Climate ==
Based on the Köppen climate classification, Mount Queets is located in the marine west coast climate zone of western North America. Weather fronts originating in the Pacific Ocean travel northeast toward the Olympic Mountains. As fronts approach, they are forced upward by the peaks (orographic lift), causing them to drop their moisture in the form of rain or snow. As a result, the Olympics experience high precipitation, especially during the winter months in the form of snowfall. Because of maritime influence, snow tends to be wet and heavy, resulting in avalanche danger. During winter months weather is usually cloudy, but due to high pressure systems over the Pacific Ocean that intensify during summer months, there is often little or no cloud cover during the summer.

== See also ==
- Queets River
- Geology of the Pacific Northwest
