= Salmon River (Washington) =

Location
- Country: United States
- State: Washington
- County: Jefferson

Physical characteristics
- Source: Olympic Mountains
  - coordinates: 47°31′27″N 124°2′29″W
- Mouth: Queets River
  - coordinates: 47°33′21″N 124°13′12″W
- Length: 18 mi (29 km)
- Basin size: 56 mi^{2} (150 km^{2})
- Discharge
  - location: Queets River
  - average: 288 cu ft/s (8.2 m^{3}/s)

The Salmon River is a tributary of the Queets River in U.S. state of Washington.

The river flows roughly from east to south, with the North Fork Salmon River, Middle Fork Salmon River, South Fork Salmon River, combining to form the Salmon River, which empties into the Queets River. The river's length, including its longest source tributary, the Middle Fork, is 18 miles (29 km). The main stem Salmon River, below the North Fork, is about 13 miles (21 km) long. The Salmon's drainage basin is 56 square miles (150 km^{2}) in area.

== Geology ==
The North, Middle, and South Fork watersheds are composed of shale, and sandstone, both sedimentary rocks, while the watershed of the lower Salmon River is composed of "coastal piedmont consisting of porous, unconsolidated deposits of Olympic alpine glaciers, including gravels, sands, silts and clays."

== Ecology ==
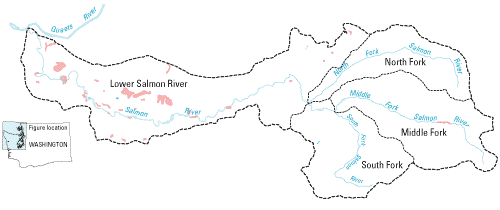
Map of the Salmon River watershed.

More than 80% of the watershed is covered by coniferous forests (including Sitka spruce, western hemlock, and Douglas-fir), with the remainder being hardwood stands and unforested wetlands.

There is a hatchery on the river that breeds Coho salmon and Chinook salmon. Some number of hatchery Winter steelhead smolts are planted in the river every year. Sea-run cutthroat trout and Chinook salmon also inhabit the river.

== See also ==
- List of rivers of Washington (state)
