= Sams River =

River in Washington, United States

- Mouth of Sams River in Washington

Location
- Country: United States
- State: Washington
- Region: Olympic Peninsula
- County: Jefferson

Physical characteristics
- Source: Finely Peak
  - location: Olympic National Park
  - coordinates: 47°35′18″N 123°45′28″W
  - elevation: 2,780 ft (850 m)
- Mouth: Queets River
  - location: Olympic National Park
  - coordinates: 47°37′26″N 124°0′46″W
  - elevation: 290 ft (88 m)
- Length: 15.7 mi (25.3 km)
- Basin size: 30.8 sq mi (80 km^{2})

Sams River is a river in the U.S. state of Washington. A tributary of the Queets River, Sams River flows through Olympic National Park and Olympic National Forest. Part of the river's lower course forms the boundary between the national park and national forest.

Sams River is 15.7 miles (25.3 km) long. Its drainage basin is 30.8 square miles (80 km^{2}) in area.

== Course ==
Sams River originates on the north slopes of Finley Peak in Olympic National Park. The river flows north a short distance, then west between Sams Ridge, to the north, and Matheny Ridge, to the south. Along the way the river leaves the national park and enters Olympic National Forest. For several miles the national park and forest boundary runs along the crest of Sams Ridge. At the western end of the ridge, where the Olympic Mountains open up into broader valleys, the boundary follows Sams River. The boundary turns south near the mouth of Sams River, leaving the final half mile or so within the national park.

Sams River joins the Queets River just upstream from Queets Campground, located near Sams Rapids on the Queets River. The Queets Ranger Station is located about a mile downstream from Sams River.

== Name ==
The origin of the river's name is not certain. There are two stories about it. According to one story the name comes from Harry and Sam Sams, who were members of an important Quinault family. Every autumn they poled their dugout canoes up the Queets River to Sams Rapids and the mouth of Sams River, where they hunted elk and caught salmon, which they smoked and sold to settlers. Some historians think the name is derived from the word sams or samis, a shortened form of Samms-mish, a prominent Quinault tribal group which once lived along Sams River.

== See also ==
- List of rivers in Washington
