= Humes Glacier =

Glacier in Washington, United States

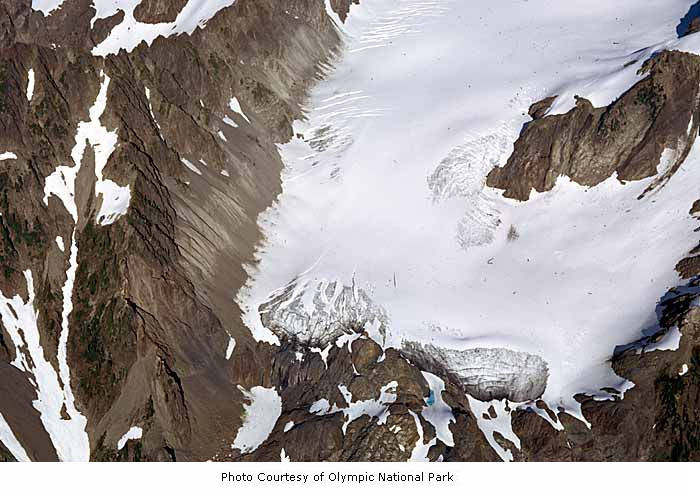

- Location within Washington (state)
- Type: Mountain glacier
- Location: Mount Olympus, Olympic National Park, Jefferson County, Washington, USA
- Coordinates: 47°47′22″N 123°39′02″W
- Length: 1.25 mi (2.01 km)
- Terminus: Icefall and Talus

Humes Glacier is located in the Olympic Mountains in Olympic National Park, approximately 2.25 miles (3.62 km) southeast of the summit of Mount Olympus. The glacier starts at nearly 6,000 ft (1,800 m) and descends downslope 1.25 mi (2.01 km), terminating at 4,800 ft (1,500 m) above sea level.

It was named by members of The Mountaineers climbing club in 1907 for Grant and Will Humes, who were guides, explorers, and pack-train operators.

== See also ==
- List of glaciers in the United States
