= Queets River =

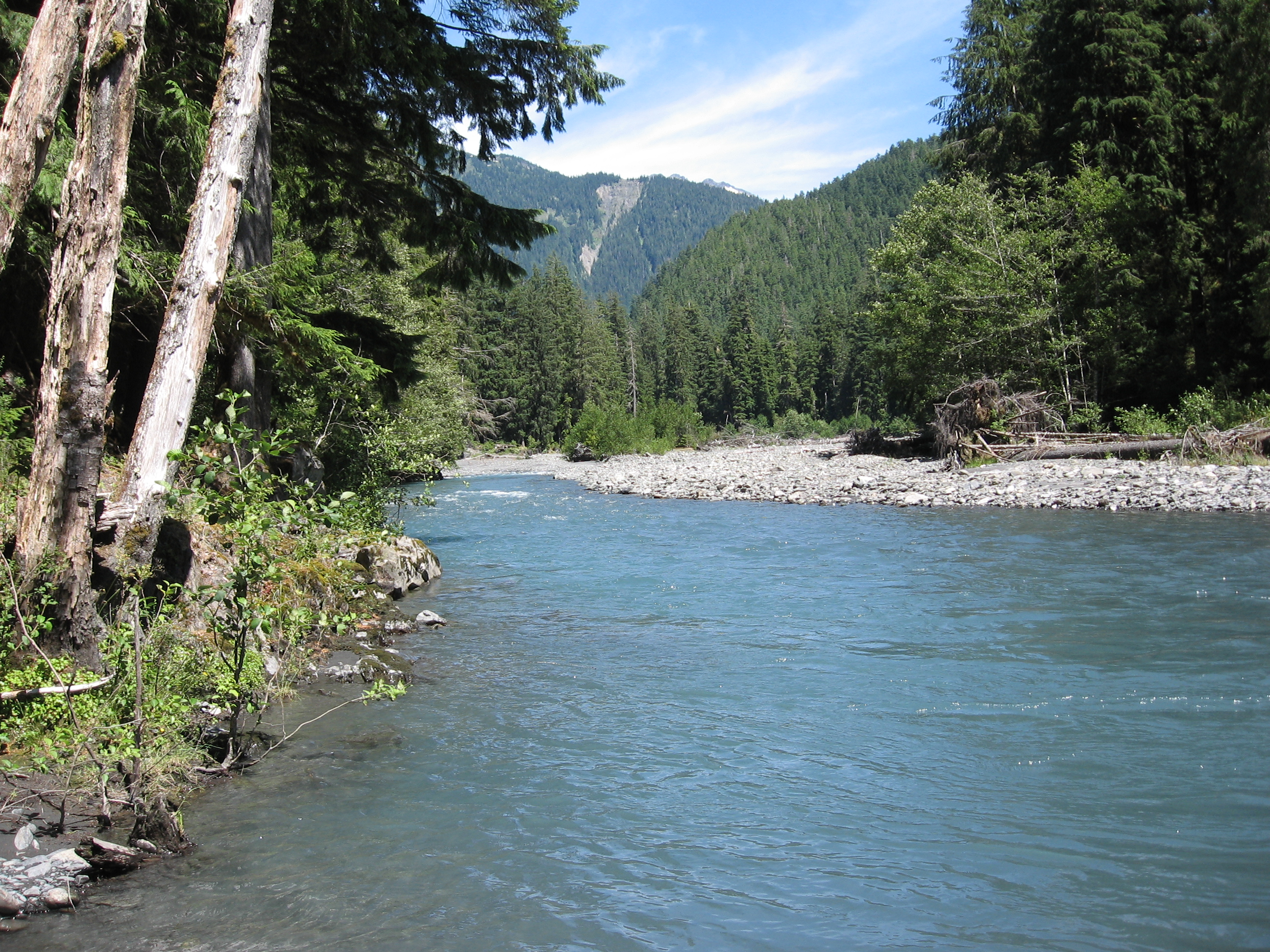

- Mouth of the Queets River in Washington
- Etymology: K'witzq^{u} or q^{u}itzq^{u}, Quinault for "out of the first of the skin".

Location
- Country: United States
- State: Washington
- County: Jefferson

Physical characteristics
- Source: Humes Glacier, Mount Olympus
  - location: Olympic Mountains
  - coordinates: 47°47′21″N 123°36′28″W
  - elevation: 4,230 ft (1,290 m)
- Mouth: Pacific Ocean
  - location: Near Queets, Washington
  - coordinates: 47°32′40″N 124°21′22″W
  - elevation: 0 ft (0 m)
- Length: 52.8 mi (85.0 km)
- Basin size: 204 sq mi (530 km^{2})
- Discharge
  - location: USGS gage 12040500, river mile 4.6
  - average: 4,347 cu ft/s (123.1 m^{3}/s)
  - minimum: 281 cu ft/s (8.0 m^{3}/s)
  - maximum: 133,000 cu ft/s (3,800 m^{3}/s)

Basin features
- Tributaries
  - left: Tshletsky Creek, Sams River, Salmon River
  - right: Clearwater River

The Queets River is a river in the U.S. state of Washington. It is located on the Olympic Peninsula, mostly within the Olympic National Park and empties into the Pacific Ocean.

The Queets River is 52.8 miles (85.0 km) long. Its drainage basin is 204 square miles (530 km^{2}) in area. Its main tributaries include the Clearwater River, Salmon River, Sams River, Matheny Creek, and Tshetshy Creek, as well as the Clearwater's main tributaries, the Snahapish River and Solleks River.

== History ==
According to Queets and Quinault legend, river was originally called K'witzq^{u} or q^{u}itzq^{u}, pronounced "Kw-ā-tz", meaning "out of the dirt of the skin". The legend tells of Kwate, the changer, or s'qit^{u}, the Great Spirit and Transformer, came to the mouth of the Queets River. After fording the cold river he rubbed his legs to restore circulation, small rolls of dirt formed under his hand. He threw them into the water and from them a man and a woman came forth, who became the ancestors of the Queets people. Kwate told them they would remain on the river and would be known as K'witzq^{u}, because of the dirt from which your skin was made. According to William Bright the river's name comes from the Quinault word /q'ʷícx̣ʷ/, meaning "dirt".

The name "Queets River" first appeared on the Surveyor General's map of Washington Territory and was later applied to other features. The word "Queets" was derived from the name of the Quai'tso tribe (Queets). Despite the name Queets River appearing on official maps, settlers called it Big River for many years, in contrast to its tributary the Clearwater River, which was called the Little River.

== Course ==
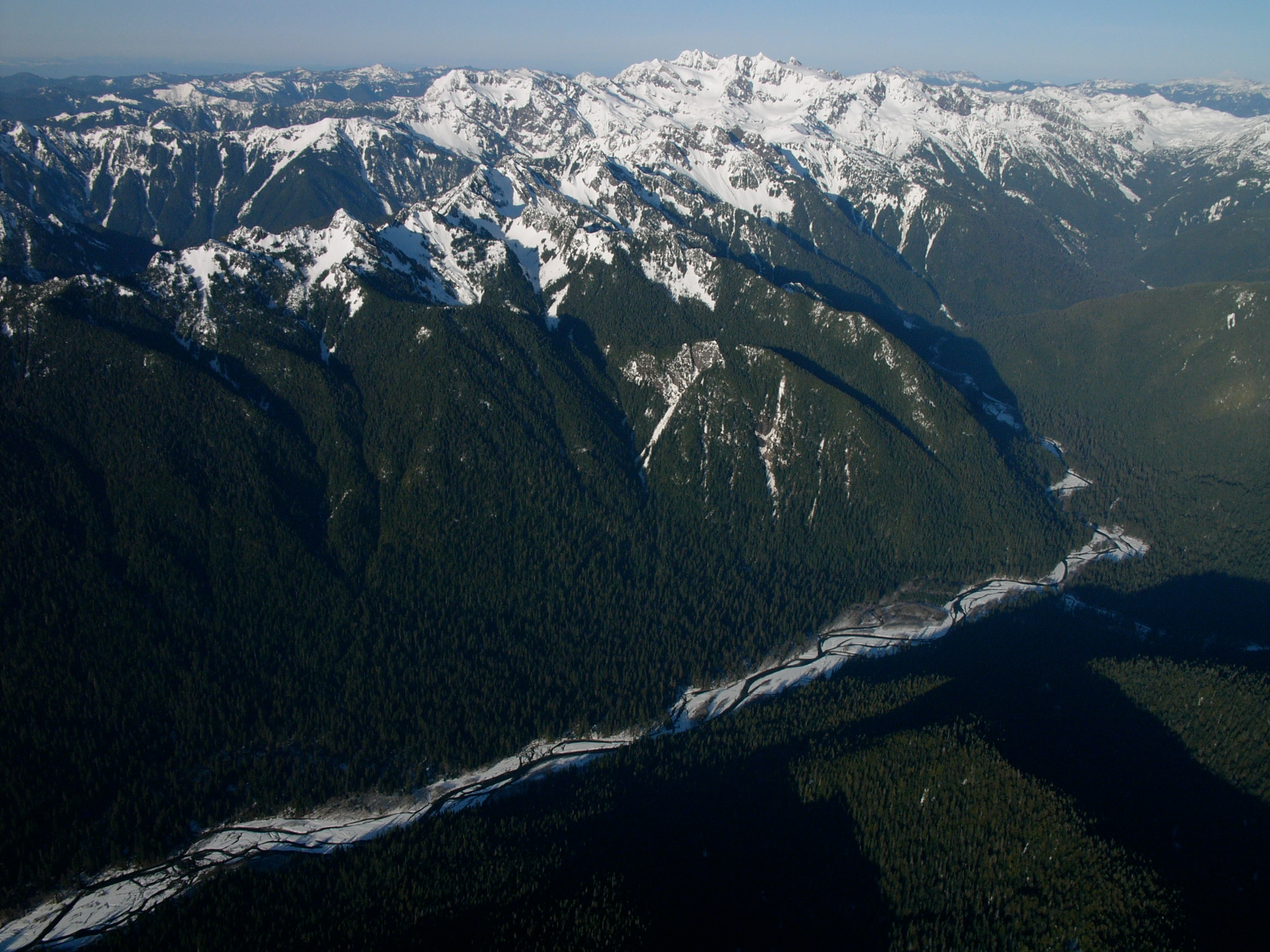
A portion of the upper course of the Queets River.

The Queets River originates at the foot of the Humes Glacier on the southeast side of Mount Olympus in the Olympic Mountains. It is also fed by Jeffers Glacier, on the south side of Mount Olympus, and Queets Glacier, on the north side of Mount Queets. The river flows through a narrow canyon, cascading over Service Falls en route, to a point just below Paull Creek, where the valley opens up a bit. From there the river flows generally west to just below Kilkelly Creek, then south to just below Alta Creek, where the valley width expands once more into a typical U-shaped valley glacial river valley. The Queets then flows generally southwest, collecting numerous tributaries including the Clearwater River, Salmon River, and Sams River before emptying into the Pacific Ocean near the community of Queets.

Nearly all of the river is within Olympic National Park. The last 4 miles (6.4 km) are outside the park, within the Quinault Indian reservation. A short portion of the river near its mouth is within Grays Harbor County while the rest is in Jefferson County.

== Natural history ==
The Queets River is unusual in being a large river flowing through a relatively low-gradient, heavily forested alluvial valley. The forests on the western side of the Olympic Mountains have one of the highest rates of biomass production per unit area in North America. Discharge rates in the winter can be very high, sometimes with surges up to or over 100,000 cubic feet per second (2,800 m^{3}/s). This combination results in frequent log jams and new channels. The river is not kept clear of woody debris, making it one of the few North American rivers of its size in which large log jams are common. The USGS operates a stream gage 4.6 miles (7.4 km) above the mouth of the Queets, 2.4 miles (3.9 km) downriver from the mouth of the Clearwater River. The mean annual discharge recorded over the lifetime of this gage up to 2009, is 4,347 cubic feet per second (123.1 m^{3}/s). The peak maximum discharge was 133,000 cubic feet per second (3,800 m^{3}/s), recorded on December 15, 1999. The maximum daily mean discharge was 91,100 cubic feet per second (2,580 m^{3}/s), recorded on March 19, 1997. A minimum daily mean discharge of 281 cubic feet per second (8.0 m^{3}/s) was recorded from September 25–28, 2005.

== Recreation ==
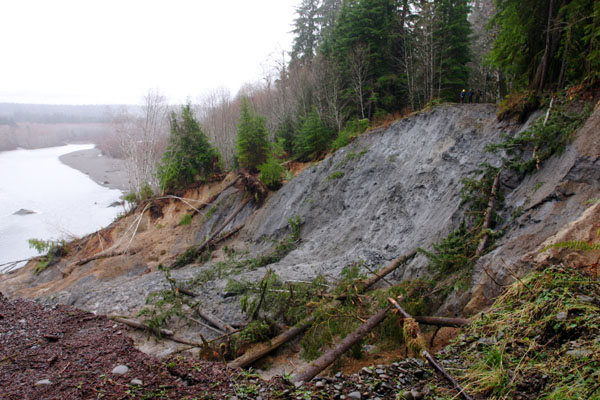
Landslide on the Queets River Road, in the winter of 2006. The road has since been rerouted.

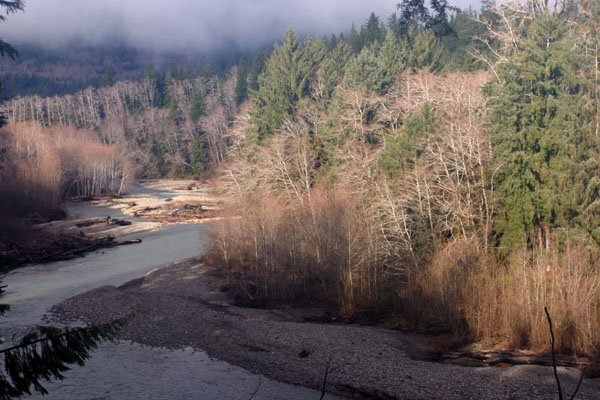
Another view of the Queets River.

There is a primitive National Park Service campground and ranger station (no longer staffed) at the end of the Queets River Road. The Queets River Trail begins on the north bank of the river, across from the campground, and follows the river about 16 miles (26 km) upstream. Access to the trailhead requires fording the Queets River, which can be treacherous. There are primitive campsites along the trail at the Lower Crossing Way Trail junction and Spruce Bottom.

The river is runnable by kayak or canoe from the campground to the Highway 101 bridge (roughly 19 miles (31 km)), but is replete with hazards, mainly in the form of log jams.

== See also ==
- List of Washington rivers
