= Asahel Curtis =

American photographer (1874–1941)

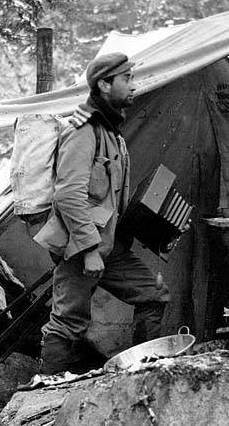
- Born: 1874; Minnesota, US
- Died: 1941 (aged 66–67)
- Occupation: photographer

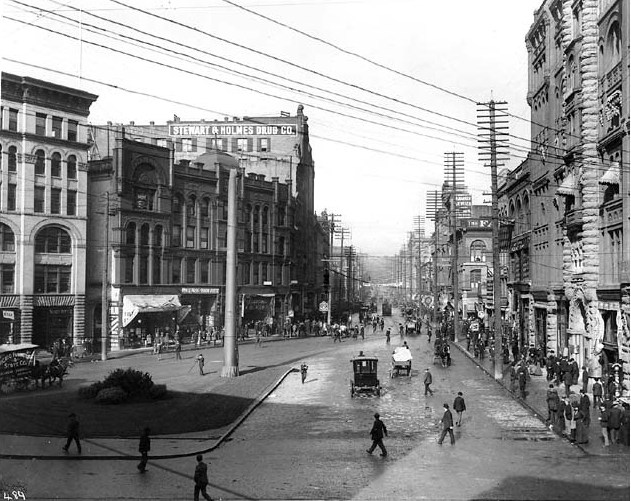
Asahel Curtis' photo of Seattle in 1900

Asahel Curtis (1874–1941) was an American photographer based in the Pacific Northwest region of the United States. His career included documentation of the Klondike Gold Rush period in Seattle, natural landscapes in the Northwest, and infrastructure projects in Seattle.

== Early life ==
Asahel Curtis was born in 1874 in Minnesota to Johnson Asahel Curtis (1840–1887) and Ellen Sheriff (1844–1912). Johnson Curtis was a clergyman and American Civil War veteran who was born in Ohio to a father born in Canada and mother from Vermont. Ellen Sheriff was born in New York City, and both of her parents were born in England. Asahel's siblings were Raphael Curtis (1862–c1885) aka Ray Curtis; Eva Curtis (May 10, 1870, Whittaker, WI-1967, Tacoma Co, WA); and Edward Sheriff Curtis (1868–1952), a photographer and ethnologist.

In 1880 the family was living in Cordova, Minnesota, part of Le Sueur County, and Johnson Curtis was working as a retail grocer. When Edward and Asahel were teenagers they had a homemade camera. In 1885 at the age of seventeen Edward took his interest in photography and became an apprentice photographer in St. Paul, Minnesota.

== Career ==
When the Curtis family moved to Washington Territory in 1888, Edward and Asahel were just teenagers. As their careers grew, their choice of subjects became increasingly different. Edward spent 33 years documenting the traditional life of the Native American Indians. Asahel photographed Washington's natural resources and related industries, as well as the early cities of Washington state, historic events, and its population.

Asahel's brother, Edward Sheriff Curtis, supported the family by opening a photography studio in Seattle, and Asahel went to work for him in 1894. In 1897, the brothers agreed that Asahel should go to the Yukon and document the Klondike Gold Rush. Asahel remained there for two years, alternately taking pictures and working a small and largely unproductive claim. Asahel launched his photography career with that two year trip to Alaska and the Klondike. Charles Ainsworth, his mining partner, was among the many gold-seeking miners Asahel photographed between 1897 and 1899.

After working together for a few years, Edward and Asahel parted ways forever after a bitter disagreement over the rights to Asahel's Yukon photos, which Edward had published under his own name. From then on, the brothers traveled separate paths.

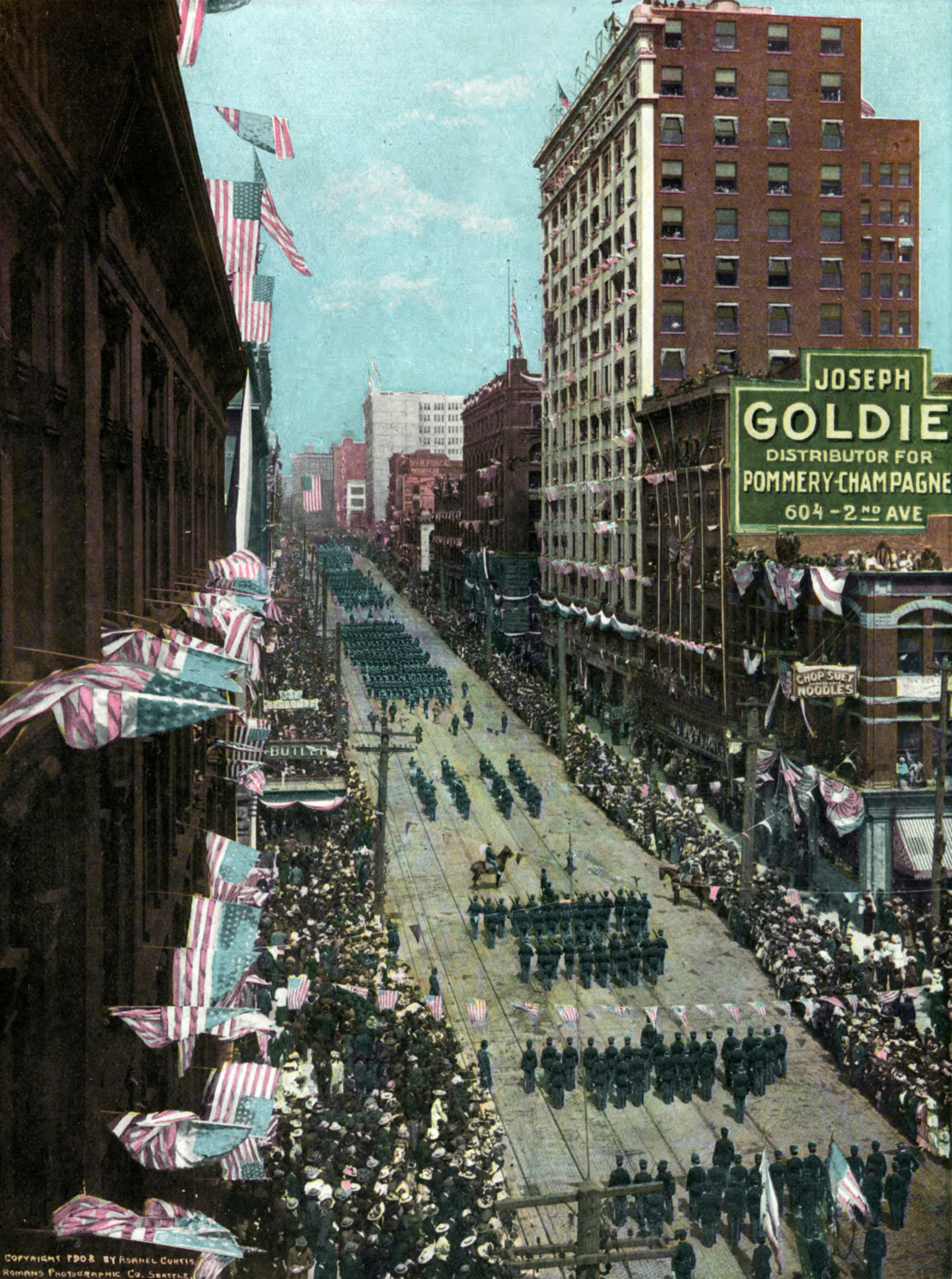
A 1908 parade in Seattle, tinted photograph by Asahel Curtis

Edward concentrated on securing funding for the North American Indian project through lectures and photograph showings. Edward later became nationally recognized for his twenty-volume series of photographs of Native Americans. Asahel also enjoyed a successful career as a photographer, although he did not receive the acclaim that Edward did. He married Florence Carney in 1902.

In 1911, Asahel established his own studio in Seattle and employed a team of developers and colorists, including his sister Eva. He was hired by a number of local companies, organizations, and wealthy individuals to take portraits and promotional photos. He became more widely known for his images of the Washington landscape that were published nationwide.

The Asahel Curtis Photo Company Photographs in the collection of the University of Washington Libraries Digital Collection of 1,677 items provides one of the most valuable photographic records of Seattle, the state of Washington, Alaska, and the Klondike, covering a period from the 1850s until 1940.

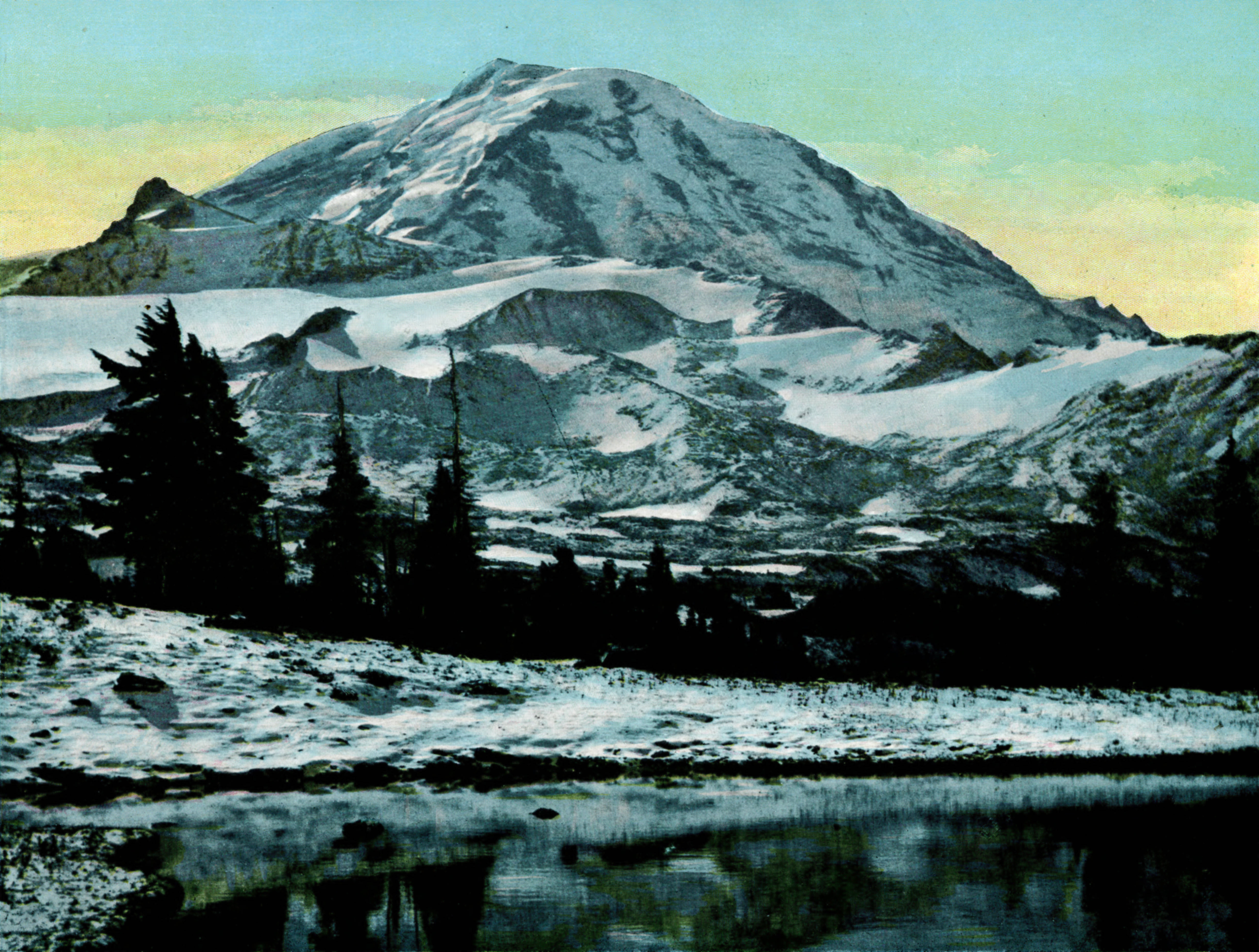
Photo of Mount Rainier by Asahel Curtis, 1908

Curtis was a keen observer of people, places and events, Asahel documented the Washington timber, agriculture, fishing and mining industries. He photographed historic events such as presidential visits, the building of the dams on the Columbia River, and Seattle's ambitious Denny Regrade project.

Curtis appreciated the beauty and uniqueness of Mount Rainier so much that for several decades he directed his appreciation for scenic beauty and his efforts at regional boosterism and combined them into the development of Mount Rainier National Park. Curtis was a founding member of the Mountaineers, a mountain-climbing group which also promoted the preservation of wilderness areas. Curtis was active in the affairs of the club for the first several years after its founding in 1906. He led the Mountaineers on climbs up Mount Rainier and organized a committee within the club to deal with the Mount Rainier National Park. Curtis said:

One comes more intimately in touch with the mountains when he travels the trails. In the valleys the forests seem lower, the giant trees rise from one's side to tremendous heights and the lower growth reaches out a friendly hand to bid you welcome; but it is on the untrodden mountain heights that the traveler receives a true reward for his toil. Here where vegetation makes its last stand amid a world of ice and snow, with the lower world stretching away to the distant horizon, nature unfolds in all her beauty.

Curtis's involvement in the Seattle-Tacoma Rainier National Park Committee (later the Rainier National Park Advisory Board) strained his relations with the Mountaineers. The committee, which Curtis chaired from 1912 to 1936, was formed by community business interests to take advantage of the park's tourism potential. Curtis, through the committee, sought to promote greater accessibility to the park by building roads to increase tourism. His opposition to the expansion of the Olympic National Park in the late 1930s as a representative of the Seattle Chamber of Commerce and the timber industry led to a further deterioration of relations with the Mountaineers. It also caused a rift between Curtis and his fellow Mount Rainier boosters and effectively ended his involvement in park affairs.

Curtis's advocacy was not limited to the development of Mount Rainier National Park. While serving as the official photographer for the Seattle Chamber of Commerce, he also chaired its Development Committee and its Highway Committee for years. His interests reached beyond the Puget Sound region. Curtis owned a small orchard in Ellensburg, and he believed that the productivity of Central Washington could be improved by building irrigation projects to turn the arid region into cropland. The Washington Irrigation Association thus chose Curtis to be its president in the 1920s. He also participated in the affairs of the Washington State Good Roads Association, serving as its president in 1932 and 1933.

Curtis worked in his Seattle studio until his death in 1941. Sixty thousand of his images are held in trust by the Washington State Historical Society in Tacoma.

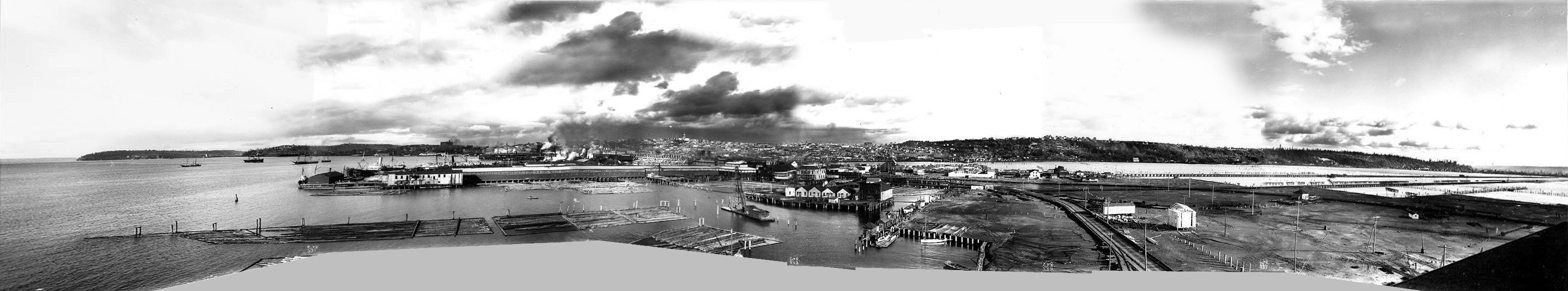
Panoramic view of Seattle in 1902, stitched from six Asahel Curtis photographs

== Legacy ==
The Upper and Lower Curtis Glaciers on Mount Shuksan in North Cascades National Park were named for Curtis, who made an early ascent of the mountain in 1906. The Asahel Curtis Trail is located in the Mount Baker-Snoqualmie National Forest, near the heavily travelled Snoqualmie Pass along Interstate 90.

== See also ==
- Theodore Peiser
