= Montesano (sternwheeler) =

American steamboat

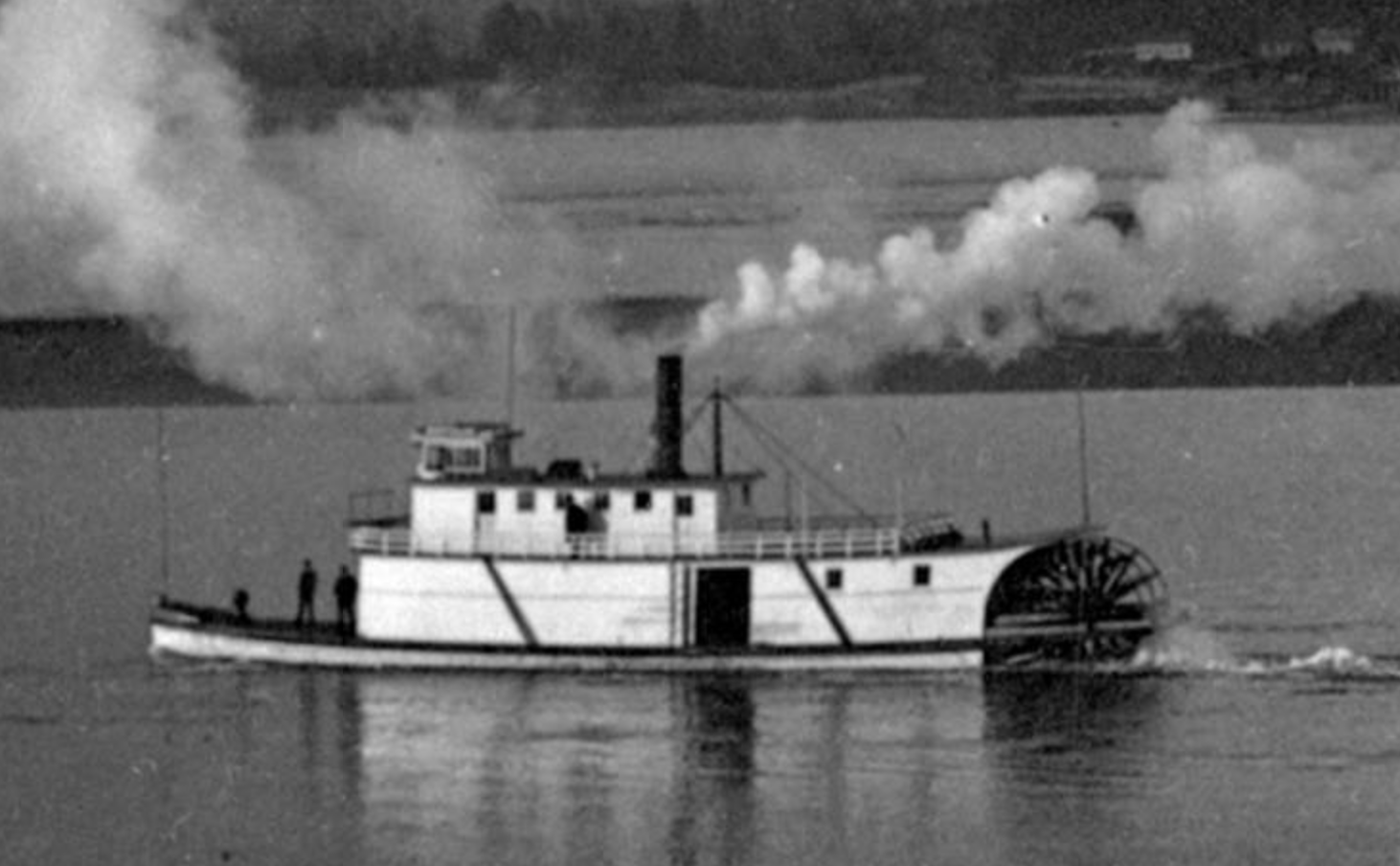
- Montesano in Yaquina Bay, probably June 1887.

History
- Name: Montesano
- In service: 1882
- Identification: U.S. 91400
- Notes: Wooden hull

General characteristics
- Type: Inland passenger/freight/towing
- Tonnage: 112.55 gross tons, 87.01 net tons
- Length: 79.6 ft (24.26 m)
- Beam: 17.8 ft (5.43 m)
- Depth: 4.4 ft (1.34 m) depth of hold
- Installed power: twin steam engines, horizontally mounted
- Propulsion: stern wheel

Montesano was a steamboat that was operated from 1882 to about 1903 in the coastal regions of Oregon and southwest Washington, including Astoria, Willapa Bay, Grays Harbor, the Chehalis River, Yaquina Bay and Coos Bay. The Montesano of 1882, built in Astoria, should not be confused with another, larger sternwheeler, also named Montesano, built-in Cosmopolis, Washington, in 1889.

== Design ==
Montesano was built in 1882 at Astoria, Oregon, for the Shoalwater Bay Transportation Company.

One of the principals of the Shoalwater Bay Transportation Company was Lewis A. Loomis (1830–1913), an early businessman in the Ilwaco - Long Beach area of Pacific County, Washington. Loomis was also a principal behind the Ilwaco Railway and Navigation Company.

A meeting of the shareholders of the Shoalwater Bay Transportation Company was scheduled to have been held on November 15, 1881, where a proposition to increase the capital stock of the company was to be acted upon. It was reported to have been probable that another steamer would be brought into service.

== Construction ==
The keel was laid on October 8, 1881. The hull and planking were from Oregon fir. The cabin structure, called the "house", was built of cedar. By December 4, 1881, planking was complete on the new steamer. It is possible that the vessel was originally intended to be named Chehalis.

The new boat was launched on Saturday, January 7, 1882. On January 9, 1882, the boat was towed to Portland by the steamer Favorite to have the machinery installed at the Willamette Iron Works. The boat was to have twin engines, each with a cylinder 12 inches in diameter with a 36-inch stroke.

By March 10, 1882, the installation of machinery was complete A name, Montesano, had been picked for the boat, after a settlement on the Chehalis River. A trial trip was taken on Wednesday afternoon, March 8, 1882, and the boat were expected to be run downriver from Portland to Astoria in a day or so after March 10. Montesano would be run together with Garfield, another steamer owned by Shoalwater Bay Transportation Co. The Daily Astorian was enthusiastic about the prospects for the new boat:

These boats are the Avant courier of coastlines that will one day center at Astoria as the natural headquarters and are admirably adapted for the trade they are to be engaged in. The country in the immediate vicinity of Gray's Harbor is a tributary by nature to this place and permanent means of communication is all that is needed for our merchants to secure the trade of that section.

== Dimensions and registry ==
When complete, Montesano was 79.6 ft (24.26 m), long with a beam of 17.8 ft (5.43 m) and depth of hold of 4.4 ft (1.34 m). The length of the sternwheeler was once reported as 95 ft (28.96 m) in the press. This difference may have been as a result of measuring the vessel over the deck, which included the stern extension to mount the stern wheel, as opposed o a shorter measurement over the length of the hull alone. The home port in 1887 was Astoria. The official merchant vessel registration number was 91400. Gross tonnage was 112.55 and net tonnage was 87.01.

== Operations on Chehalis River ==
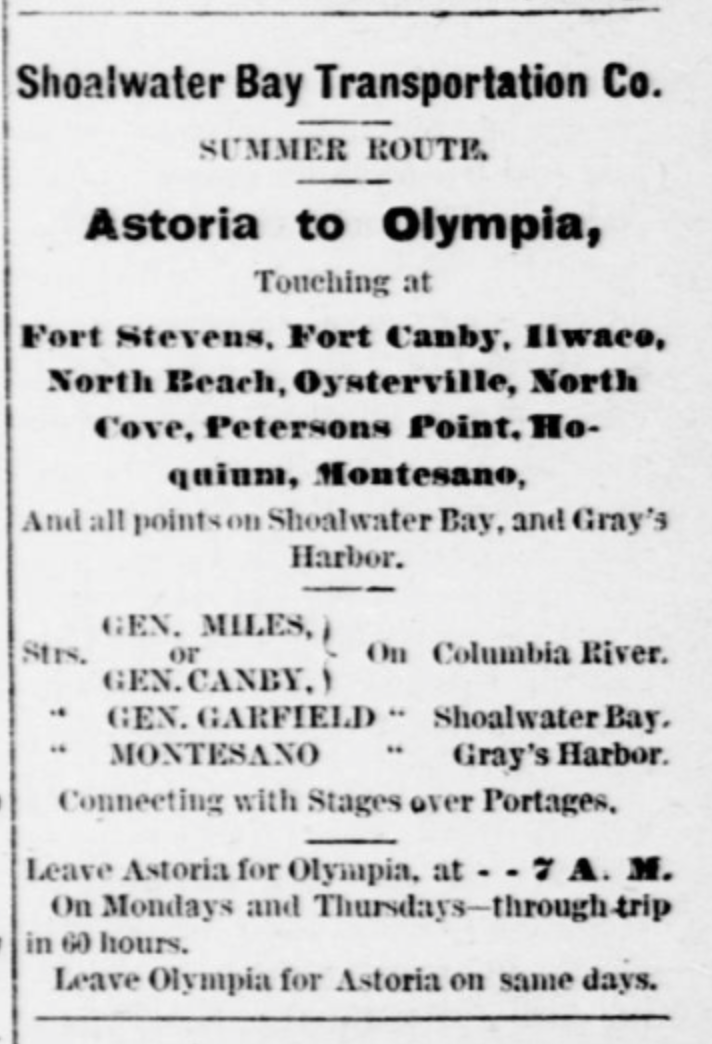
Advertisement for Shoalwater Bay Transportation Co., featuring Montesano and other steamers.

On the Thursday before May 3, 1882, Montesano left Astoria for the Chehalis River and arrived on the same day.

In November 1882, Montesano was running to Elma, Washington on the Chehalis River.

In the summer of 1882, Montesano operated as part of a transportation line connecting Astoria with Olympia, Washington by a combination of steamboats and stage lines. Travellers on this route could reach Olympia from Astoria in 60 days.

Starting on March 14, 1883, the steamers of the Shoalwater Bay Transportation Company carried mail from Astoria to Montesano, Washington and then to Olympia once a week, with extra mail on Saturday. It took one day on this route to reach Montesano from Astoria. Travel time to Olympia continued to take 60 hours.

== Mail run on Willapa Bay ==
Some sources indicate that Montesano operated on Willapa Bay, then known as Shoalwater Bay. In 1882, the Shoalwater Bay Transportation Company launched Montesano at Astoria to run mail from Willapa (originally known as Woodard's Landing) to Sealand, now known as Nahcotta, Washington on the Long Beach Peninsula.

Woodard's Landing, which in October 1884 was described as "the second place of importance in the region", was about 10 miles up the Willapa River from the present city of South Bend, Washington. Steamers at South Bend could readily reach Woodard's Landing at high tide. In late 1884, the settlement at Woodard's Landing, which was sustained principally by the logging industry on the upper Willapa River, consisted of two stores, two hotels, and a warehouse.

Montesano was handled on the Willapa Bay route by two members of a prominent steamboating family, Capt. James P. Whitcomb as master and his brother George A. Whitcomb (1854–1937), as a mate.

== Lower Columbia River service ==
Montesano's service on the Chehalis River was brief. The boat was then transferred to the lower Columbia River, where it was in service from 1886 to 1889, according to one historian. A contemporary source states however that Montesano was transferred to Yaquina Bay, in the central Oregon coast, in June 1887. Prior to the departure for Yaquina Bay, Montesano is reported to have been once more in service in Grays Harbor, but dates for this second period of operations in the Chehalis River area are not furnished in the source.

== Yaquina Bay service ==
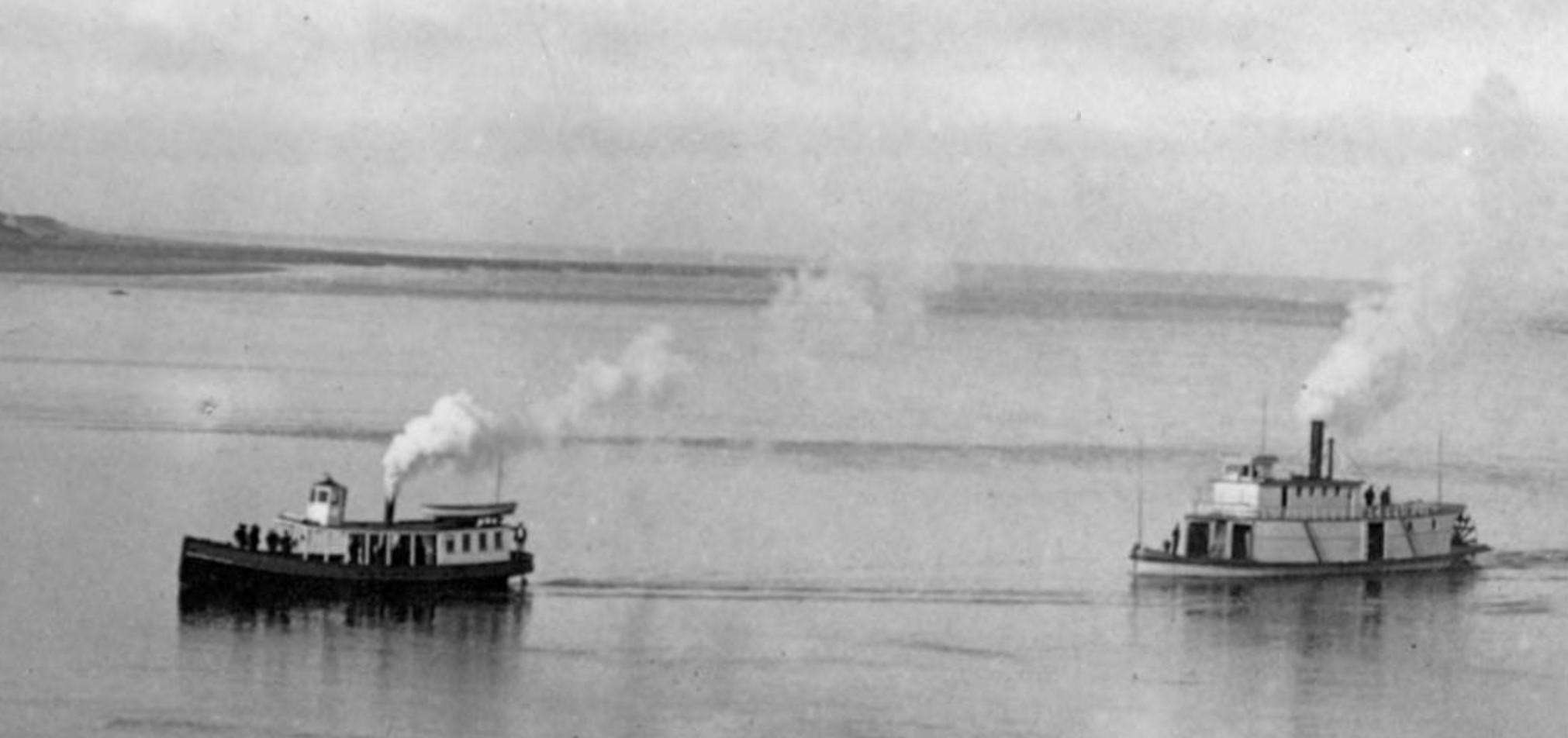
Tressa May leading Montesano in a race, probably in June 1887.

On the evening of June 8, 1887, Montesano departed Astoria bound for Yaquina Bay which was to be the boat's new base of operations. On August 19, 1887, it was reported that the Shoalwater Bay Transportation Company was about to disincorporate.

Montesano was reported in a contemporary source owned by D.H. Welch when in service at Yaquina Bay in 1887. In June, 1887, D.H. Welch raced Montesano against the propeller-driven steamer Tressa May. The race went from Yaquina City to Newport, Oregon. Both vessels arrived at almost the same time, with Montesano just a little ahead. H.W. Dunham (b. 1845) is also reported to have been master of Montesano while the boat was in Yaquina Bay, which may have been subsequent to D.H. Welch.

== Difficult transfer to Coos Bay ==
Montesano was transferred to Coos Bay by H.W. Dunham. There were difficulties in carrying out the transfer. Montesano may have been taken in Astoria from Yaquina Bay before transfer to Coos Bay. Montesano was reported to have departed Astoria a few days prior to June 13, 1888. It was later reported that Montesano had gone ashore on the south spit at the mouth of the Nehalem River. Further details were not then available.

On July 2, 1888, Montesano was still at Yaquina. It was reported that the boat would leave for Coos Bay "at the first favorable opportunity." On July 4, 1888, the tug Columbia, under Captain Magee, was dispatched from Coos Bay to Yaquina Bay to bring down Montesano, which then belonged to the Southern Oregon Company. Arriving at Yaquina Bay, Columbia found the bar so rough that two coastal steamers at the bay were unable to depart. Columbia did enter the bay, but the next day sea conditions were still too extreme for Montesano, so Columbia had to depart without the sternwheeler.

== Coos Bay service ==
The transfer to Coos Bay appears to have occurred by 1889, when Montesano's home port was listed as Coos Bay. Dunham ran Montesano on Coos Bay for nearly a year. While on Coos Bay, Montesano towed logs for the mill of the Southern Oregon Company at Empire. On September 18, 1890, Montesano was reported to be undergoing repairs at the shipyard of Christenson & Johnson. On September 25, 1890, the repairs to the Montesano were reported to be complete and the steamer was back in service. Prior to 1898, James T. Hall (b. 1859) was a master of Montesano while the boat was in Coos Bay.

== Disposition ==
Montesano out of service. Upper cabin is roofed over, smokestack absent, indicating lack of boiler, windows are boarded up and hull appears to be resting on a platform over the water.

Montesano is reported to have been laid up and stripped prior to 1900. This may have occurred later than 1900, as Montesano continued to be listed on the official merchant vessel registry in 1903.

== See also ==
- Coos Bay Mosquito Fleet
- Steamboats of Willapa Bay
- Steamboats of Yaquina Bay and river
- Steamboats of the Oregon Coast
- Steamboats of the Columbia River
