= Chief Toke =

Chief Toke was a leader of the Shoalwater Bay Tribe of Native Americans on the Pacific coast of Washington. Of Chinook and Chehalis descent, he lived with his wife Suis and extended family at Willapa Bay, spending winters near present-day Bay Center and summers in the vicinity of present-day Tokeland, which is named for him.

James G. Swan, a settler in the area from 1852 to 1855, described Toke as "a man of advanced years."
