= Cedar River (Willapa Bay) =

- Location of the mouth of the Cedar River in Washington

Location
- Country: United States
- State: Washington
- County: Pacific

Physical characteristics
- Source: Willapa Hills
  - coordinates: 46°45′46″N 124°3′17″W
  - elevation: 165 ft (50 m)
- Mouth: Willapa Bay
  - location: Tokeland, Washington
  - coordinates: 46°44′10″N 123°58′30″W
  - elevation: 0 ft (0 m)
- Length: 8 mi (13 km)

The Cedar River is a short stream flowing into the north end of Willapa Bay in the U.S. state of Washington.

The Cedar River originates near Seastrand Ridge in the Willapa Hills, about a mile east of the Pacific Ocean near Heather and Grayland Beach State Park, just south of Grayland. It flows east, then south, for about 8 mi (13 km) until emptying into the northern end of Willapa Bay near Tokeland, just east of Dexter by the Sea.

The river's lowermost course runs through part of the North Willapa Bay Wildlife Area Unit, part of the Johns River Wildlife Area.

The mouth of the Cedar River merges with Willapa Bay in a tidally-influenced estuary. There is a 275 acre protected unit called the Cedar River Estuary, managed by Forterra. This area is a tidal ecosystem with salt marshes, tidelands, and coniferous forests. It also includes Oyster Island, Bone Creek, and Norris Slough.

== See also ==
- List of rivers of Washington (state)
