= Palix River =

- Location of the mouth of the Palix River in Washington

Location
- Country: United States
- State: Washington
- County: Pacific

Physical characteristics
- Source: Canon River
  - location: Willapa Hills
  - coordinates: 46°34′13″N 123°46′46″W
- Mouth: Willapa Bay
  - coordinates: 46°38′11″N 123°56′41″W
  - elevation: 0 ft (0 m)
- Length: 14 mi (23 km)

The Palix River is a stream in the U.S. state of Washington. Its tributaries include three forks, North, Middle, and South Fork Palix River, as well as the Canon River. The river's length, including the Canon River, its longest tributary, is approximately 14 miles (23 km).

== Course ==
The Palix River rises in the Willapa Hills in Pacific County. It flows generally west to Willapa Bay, an estuary of the Pacific Ocean. The river has three fork tributaries, the North Fork, Middle Fork, and South Fork Palix River.

The North Fork originates a couple miles west of South Bend, near the source of the Bone River. It flows generally south through hilly terrain, close to the Niawiakum River. In its final mile the North Fork turns west and enters the broad and marshy Palix River tidal estuary in which the Middle Fork and South Fork join. It is approximately 7 mi (11 km) long.

The South Fork Palix River originates about a mile south of the Palix River estuary. It flows in a curving path southwest then north, less than a mile from the coast, to join the other forks in the Palix estuary. It is approximately 6 mi (9.7 km) long.

The Middle Fork Palix River originates about a mile east of the Palix River estuary. It flows west, quickly entering the estuary. In the estuary the Canon River joins the Middle Fork from the south, then the Middle Fork joins the North Fork. It is approximately 2.5 mi (4.0 km) long.

The Canon River is longer than any of the Palix River forks. It originates in the Willapa Hills and flows generally west and northwest through hilly terrain. Part of its course is through a gorge in which it receives its main tributary, Canyon Creek. After exiting the gorge the Canon River flows north and enters the Palix River estuary where it joins the Middle Fork Palix River. It is approximately 8.7 mi (14.0 km) long.

The mainstem Palix River, forms by the confluence of the three forks, flows northwest for a few miles, its estuary merging with the estuary of Willapa Bay just west of Wilson Point. The mouth of the Palix River, near Bay Center, is very close to the Niawiakum River and Bone River mouths. U.S. Route 101 crosses the mainstem Palix River. The mainstem Palix River is approximately 4.5 mi (7.2 km) long.

== History ==
According to Edmond S. Meany the river's name, which he spelled "Palux", comes from the Chehalis language and means "slough covered with trees". The name was also applied to a division of the Chinookan people who lived along the river.

== See also ==
- List of rivers of Washington (state)
