= Montesano (disambiguation) =

Montesano, Washington, is a city in Grays Harbor County, Washington, United States.

Montesano may also refer to:

== Places ==
- Montesano Salentino, Italian municipality in the Province of Lecce
- Montesano sulla Marcellana, Italian municipality in the Province of Salerno
- Monte Sano Mountain, in the U.S. state of Alabama

== People ==
- Enrico Montesano (born 1945), Italian actor
- Michael Montesano (born 1954), American politician

== Other ==
- Montesano (sternwheeler), steamboat that operated in Oregon and Washington, U.S., in the late 19th century
