= Bone River =

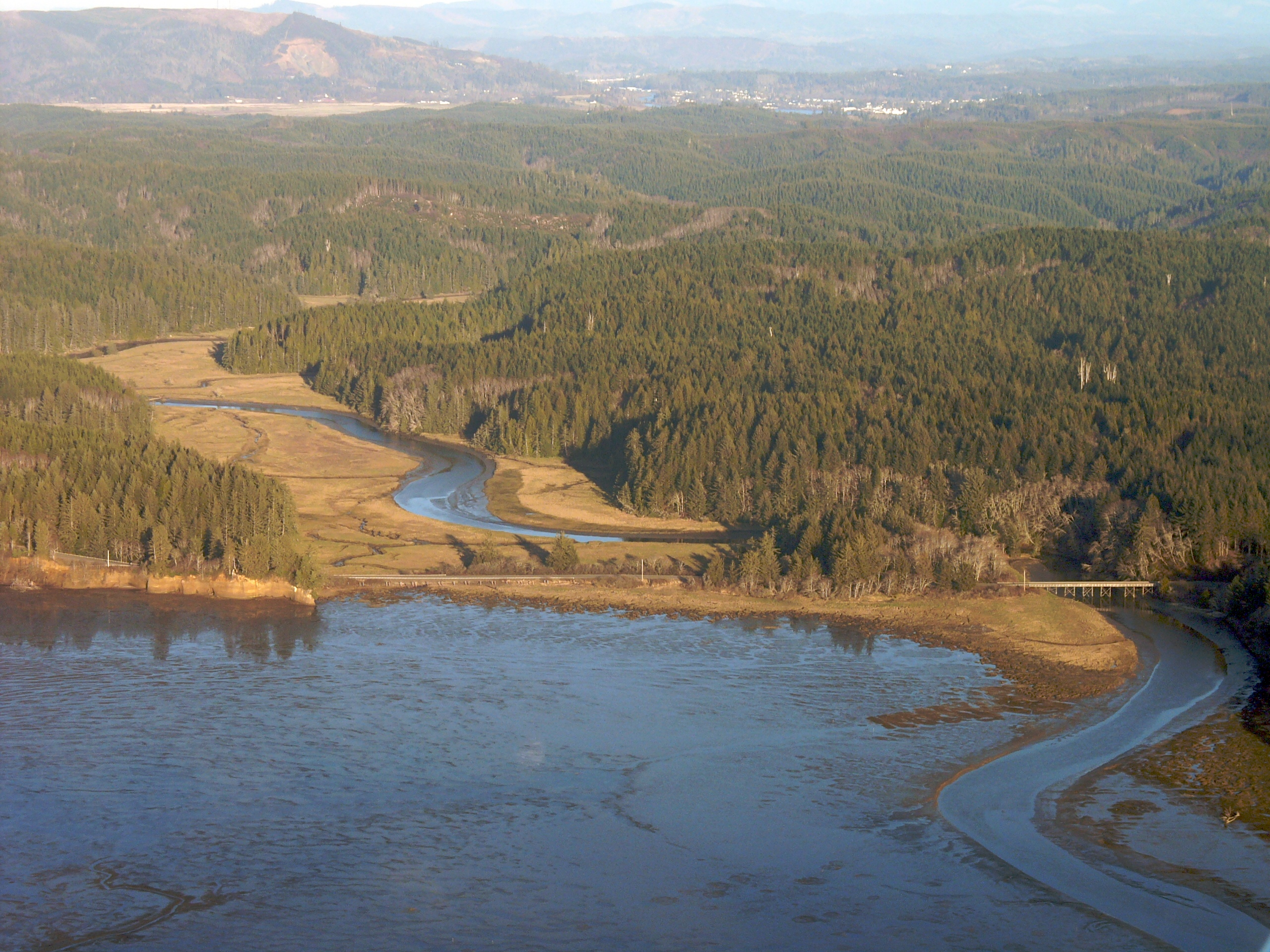
- Mouth of the Bone River

- Location of the mouth of the Bone River in Washington Bone River (the United States)

Location
- Country: United States
- State: Washington
- County: Pacific

Physical characteristics
- Source: Willapa Hills
  - coordinates: 46°39′22″N 123°51′19″W
- Mouth: Willapa Bay
  - coordinates: 46°38′57″N 123°55′26″W
  - elevation: 0 ft (0 m)
- Length: 6 mi (9.7 km)

The Bone River is a short river in the U.S. state of Washington. It is about 6 miles (9.7 km) long.

== Course ==
The Bone River originates in the hills of the southwestern part of Washington, close to the source of the North Fork Palix River. It flows generally west, emptying into Willapa Bay near Bay Center just north of the Niawiakum River. The river's entire length is only a few miles. Most of the Bone River is marshy. It empties into an estuary and tidal marshland on Willapa Bay. U.S. Route 101 crosses the river near its mouth.

== History ==
A smallpox epidemic swept through the Pacific Northwest in 1853. One of the first documented cases occurred at the mouth of the Bone River. A homesteader named James Swan witnessed the disease breaking out among the Chinook Indians after several ships had wrecked off the mouth of the nearby Columbia River. Swan's is the only first-hand account of the epidemic among the Chinook. Within a year the Chinookan population had been reduced by perhaps half and the disease had spread far up the Columbia River, all along the coasts of Washington and Oregon, to Vancouver Island, the Skagit River and the Nooksack River.

== Natural history ==
Part of the river's drainage basin is a protected land preserve called the Bone River Natural Area Preserve. Totaling 2,565 acres (1,038 ha), the preserve contains the finest salt marsh remaining in Willapa Bay and is a critically important waterfowl habitat.

There are ongoing efforts to protect more of the Bone River along with the nearby Niawiakum River estuary.

== See also ==
- List of rivers of Washington (state)
