= Willapa National Wildlife Refuge =

Wildlife reserve in Washington state, US

- IUCN category IV (habitat/species management area)
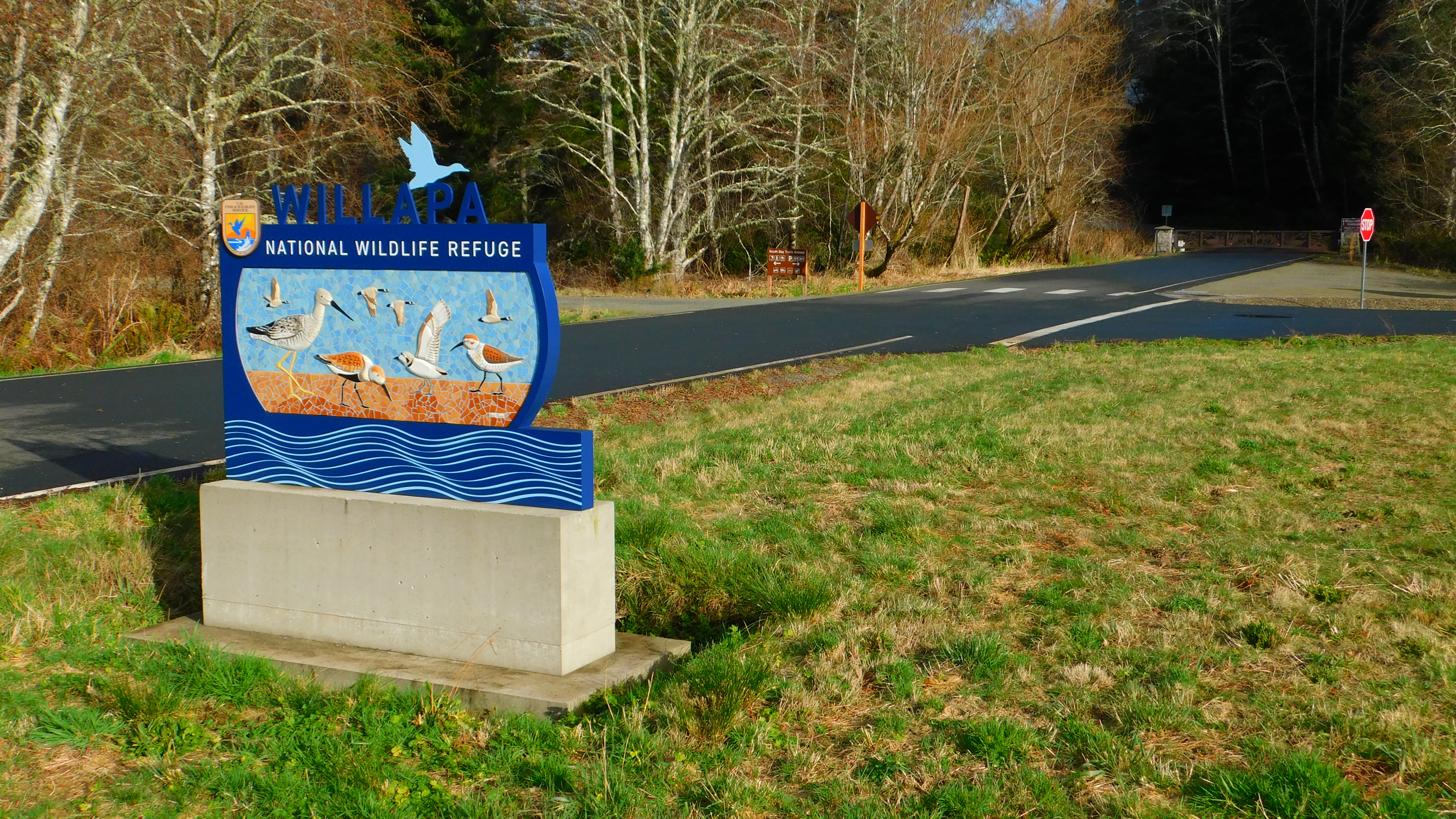
- Willapa National Wildlife Refuge, 2025

- Location within the United States
- Location: Pacific County, Washington, United States
- Nearest city: Ocean Park, Washington
- Coordinates: 46°26′30″N 123°58′00″W
- Area: 11,000 acres (45 km^{2})
- Established: 1937
- Governing body: U.S. Fish and Wildlife Service
- Website: Willapa National Wildlife Refuge

Willapa National Wildlife Refuge is a National Wildlife Refuge located on the shores of Willapa Bay in Washington, United States. It comprises 11,000 acres (45 km^{2}) of sand dunes, sand beaches, mudflats, grasslands, saltwater and freshwater marshes, and coniferous forest. The refuge includes Long Island with stands of old growth Western red cedar and hemlock.

== Wildlife and habitat ==
Willapa National Wildlife Refuge preserves many unique ecosystems including salt marshes, muddy tideflats, rain drenched old growth forests, and coastal dunes and beaches. Freshwater marshes and grasslands are found along the southern shore of Willapa Bay.

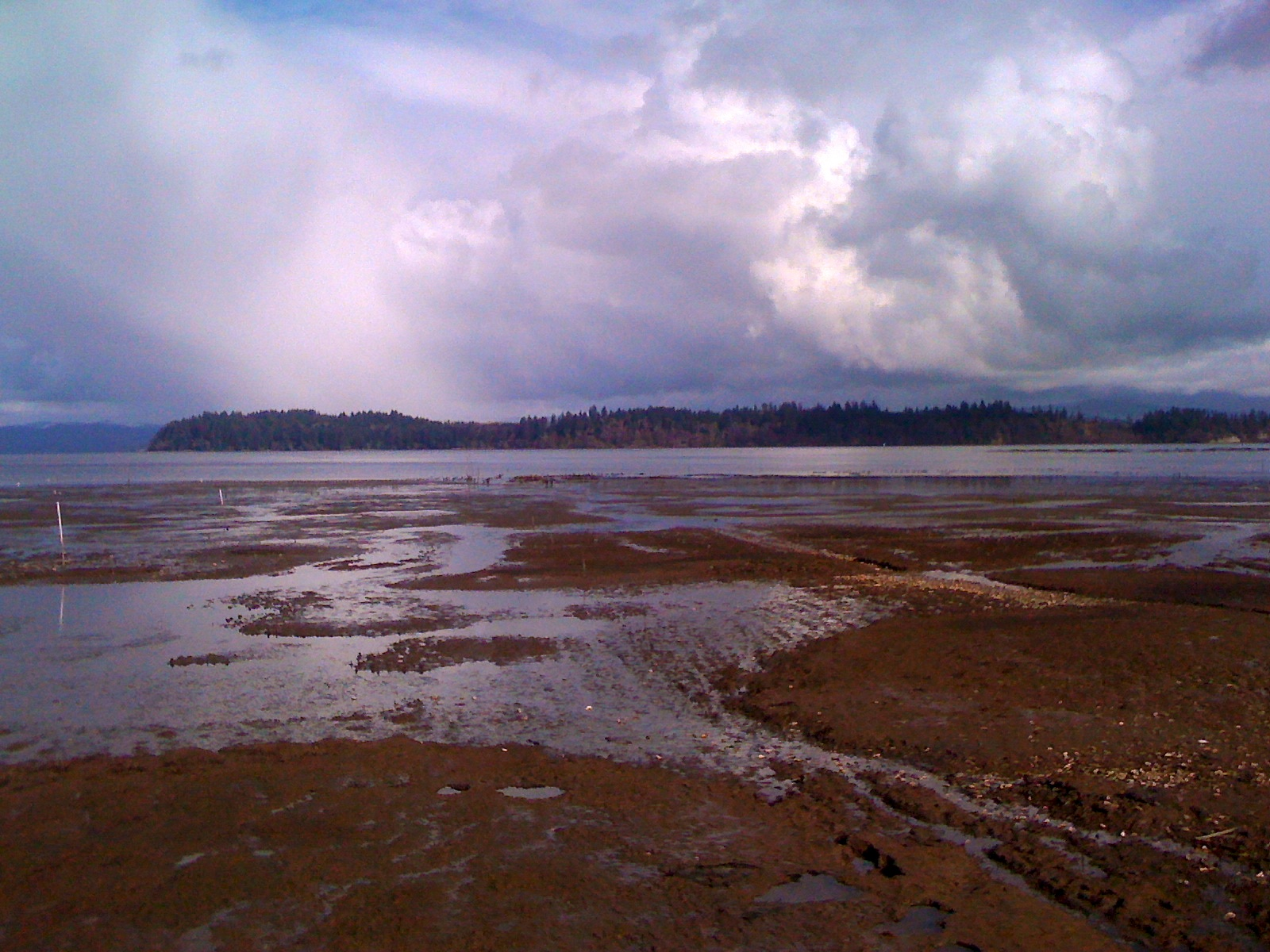
Refuge, 2012

Visitors to the Willapa National Wildlife Refuge can enjoy viewing a wide variety of wildlife. Roosevelt elk, black bear, shorebirds, and spawning salmon are just a few of the many species that reside on the Refuge. The refuge is home to several endangered and threatened species including the snowy plover, marbled murrelets, and brown pelican. Other birds that are commonly spotted throughout the refuge include bald eagles, great blue herons, peregrine falcons, red-tailed hawks, marsh wrens, and golden-crowned kinglets.

== Management activities ==
Willapa National Wildlife Refuge deals with a number of unique challenges. While it contains many pristine areas, it also includes many recent acquisitions where considerable restoration efforts are needed. It includes a vast diversity of habitats from ocean sand dune beaches to the sheltered mudflats of the bay, from pristine old growth forests to open saltgrass meadows. The refuge is home to several threatened and endangered species and is trying to restore habitat for many others. Like many places, Willapa NWR is also coping with the threat of invasive species.

The refuge received a $1.3 million apportionment from the Migratory Bird Conservation Commission in 2023 to purchase 239 acres (97 ha) focused towards the additional access to recreation and wildlife viewing.
