= Tokeland Hotel =

- U.S. National Register of Historic Places
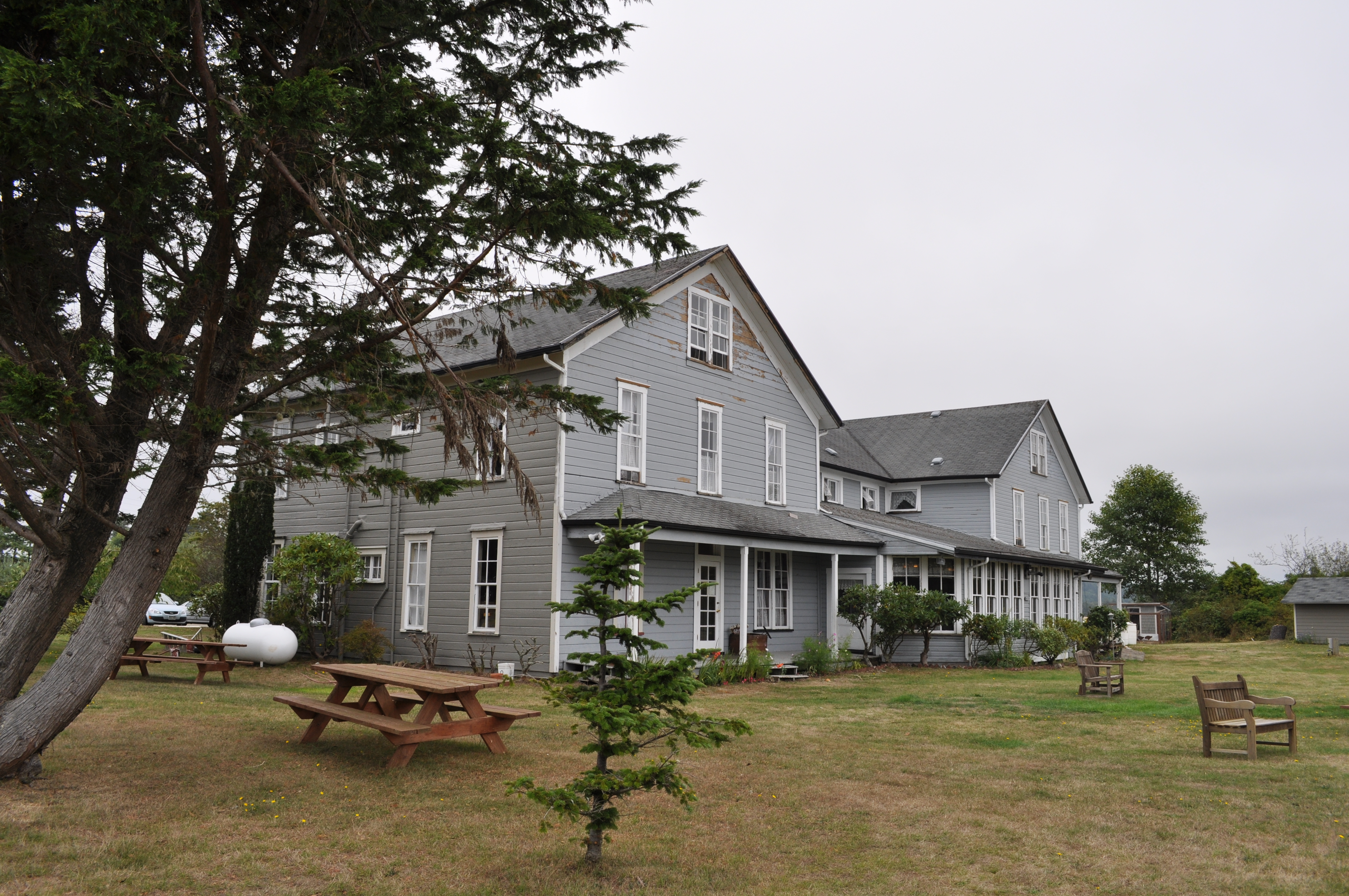

- Location within Washington (state)
- Location: Kindred Avenue and Hotel Road, Tokeland, Washington
- Coordinates: 46°42′30.3″N 123°59′04.6″W
- Built: 1885
- NRHP reference No.: 78002766
- Added to NRHP: April 11, 1978

The Tokeland Hotel and Restaurant is Washington State’s oldest resort hotel located at 2964 Kindred Ave in Tokeland, Washington. In 1978, the hotel was listed on the National Register of Historic Places.

The Tokeland Hotel is situated on a peninsula with the Pacific Ocean to the west and the Willapa Bay to the south and east.

== History ==
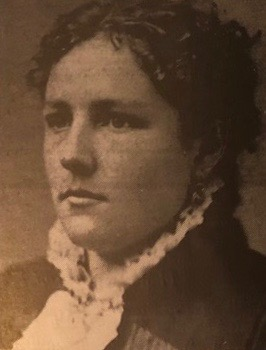
Elizabeth 'Lizzie' Brown Kindred

George H. Brown (November 4, 1824 - July 5, 1883), a Philadelphian born California gold seeker turned Portland butcher, was one of the first to settle on Toke Point when he came with his wife Charlotte Norris (? - June 22, 1891) and their two sons, Albert and Leonidas, in 1858. Among the Shoalwater Bay tribe, the Browns homesteaded 1400 acres of land, kept livestock, raised crops, and traded with locals. Their first daughter, Elizabeth "Lizzie" Brown grew up on Toke Point speaking both English and Chinook Jargon.

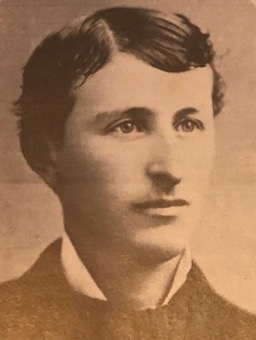
William Stingly Kindred

By November 24, 1880, Lizzie Brown married William Kindred and they purchased land from the Browns. In 1885 they completed the two-story wood frame farmhouse, with a gabled roof and brick fireplace built into the north wall, that would become the original structure of the Tokeland Hotel.

=== The Kindred Inn, Post Office, and General Store ===
On August 22, 1894 the Tokeland post office opened with a postmark bearing 'Tokeland', thus officially naming the town at Toke Point.

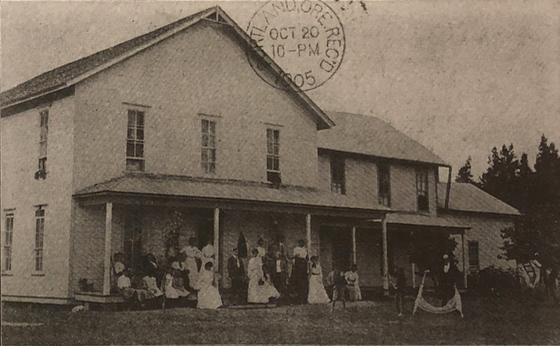
1905 view of the Tokeland Hotel from the south. The Kindred farmhouse is the two and half story structure on left. In 1899, the addition to the right was added, creating an "L" shape to the building.

In 1899, the Kindreds built a two-story addition which gave the structure an 'L' shape and opened to the public as the Kindred Inn. Shortly thereafter the name was changed to Tokeland Hotel, in honor of the Shoalwater Bay Tribe's Chief Toke, for whom Toke Point was also named.

From 1899 to 1915, William and Lizzie Kindred operated the general store out of the hotel and on December 9, 1898, William Kindred became the third Tokeland Postmaster, a role in which he served until March 5, 1915.

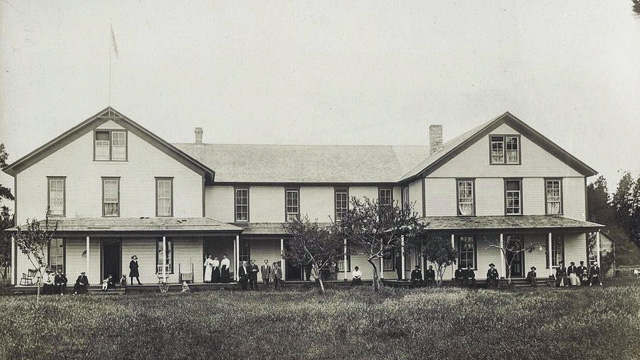
Tokeland Hotel circa 1910 with newest wing, giving the building the 'C' shape that it has today

In 1910, an additional wing was constructed, effectively giving the Tokeland Hotel the 'C' shape that it has today. According to the National Register for Historic Places, around this time the Tokeland Hotel also received gas lighting and a second fireplace.

More renovations were completed between 1920 and 1930, including new interiors and plumbing. The Kindreds also replaced gas with electricity and extended the central dining area on the east side of the building.

The hotel's facilities grew over the years and included a golf club house (later to become Capt's Tavern), a gun club and a nine-hole golf course as well.

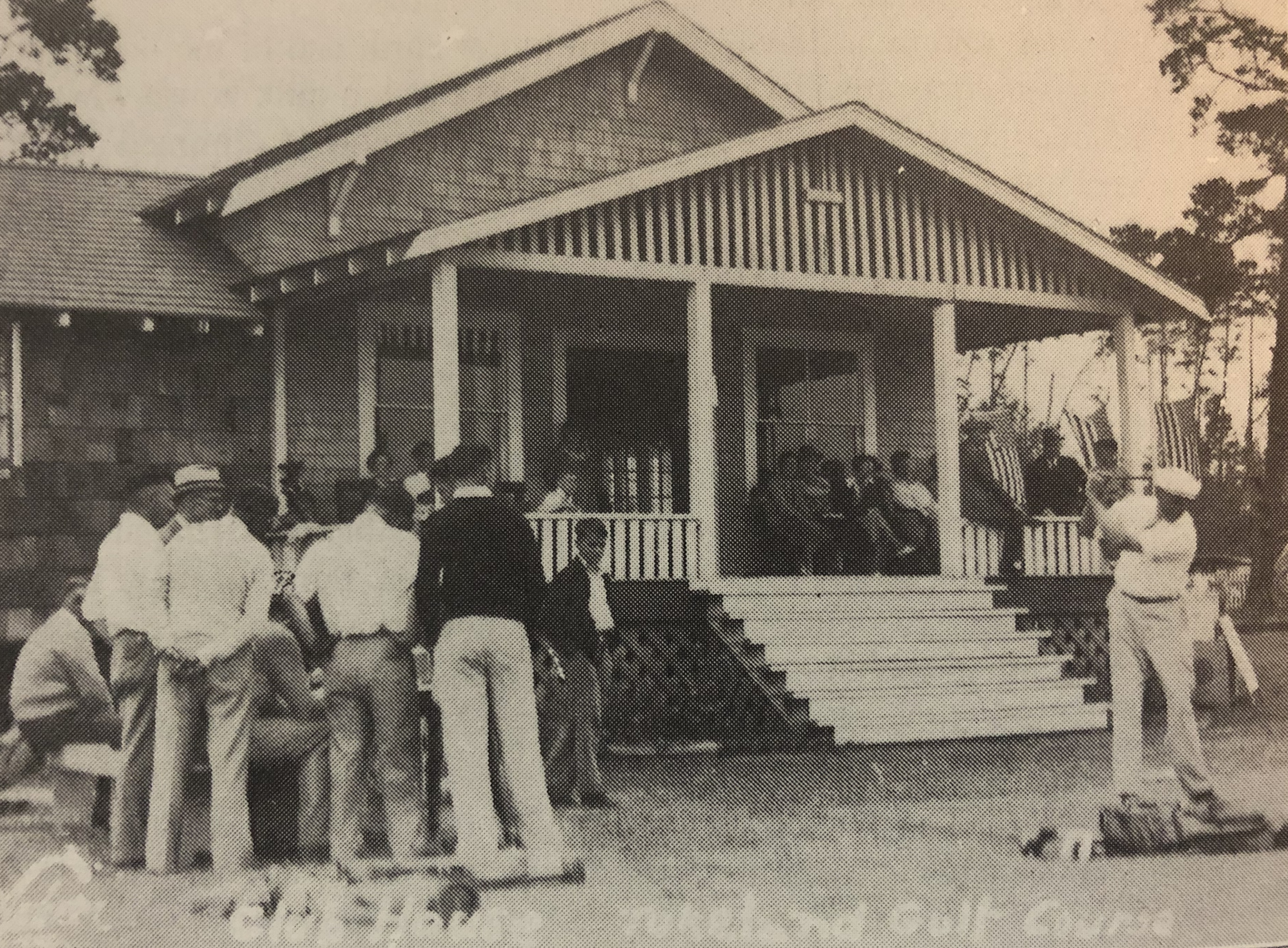
Tokeland Hotel Golf Course Club House circa 1930s

=== 'Links' Golf Course and Capt's Tavern ===
"Golf was a natural development for Tokeland. Not only were the grounds ideal for links-style golf, but a ready-made clientele of merchants, bankers, lumber barons and professional people who had the leisure time to play formed the basis of a regular summer colony" - Victory "Chub" Vaughn

The mid-1890s Northwest coast had an active golf scene. As early as 1910, there is evidence of visitors to the Tokeland Hotel bringing their own clubs and balls with them to play makeshift golf on the property.

By 1920, Maude Kindred and Ralph Harrington put in a formal nine-hole golf course just north of the hotel with tees, greens and hazards, perhaps with the help of nationally known golfer and golf architect Walter Fovargue, who lived near the Tokeland Hotel and actively played there between 1918 and 1930.

The Tokeland Hotel served as the golf clubhouse until 1929, when a boarded-up pool hall one mile east of the hotel near the old dock was rolled on planks pulled by two teams of horses to the Tokeland Hotel property, becoming the new clubhouse.

On April 9, 1933, after additions had been made, Maude Kindred opened the clubhouse as Capt's Tavern.

=== Early tourism ===
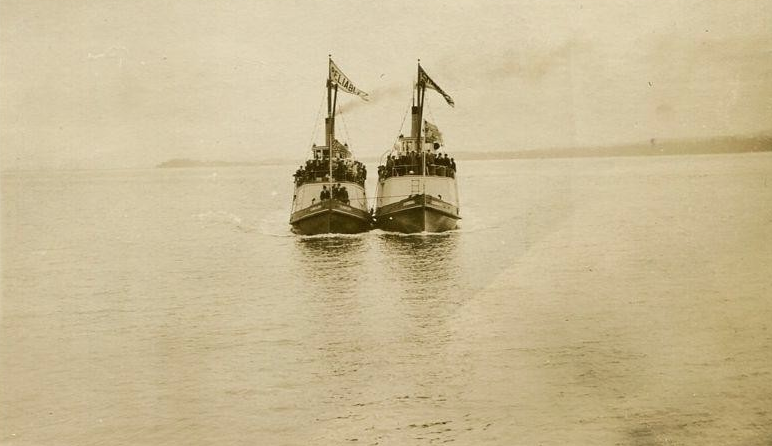
Postcard featuring Captain A.W. Reed's steamers Reliable and Shamrock ferrying passengers from Raymond to Tokeland - Dated July 4, 1912

The lumber industry around Willapa Bay and Grays Harbor helped develop Tokeland, which was known all the way to California for its fresh oysters, razor clams, crab and fish.

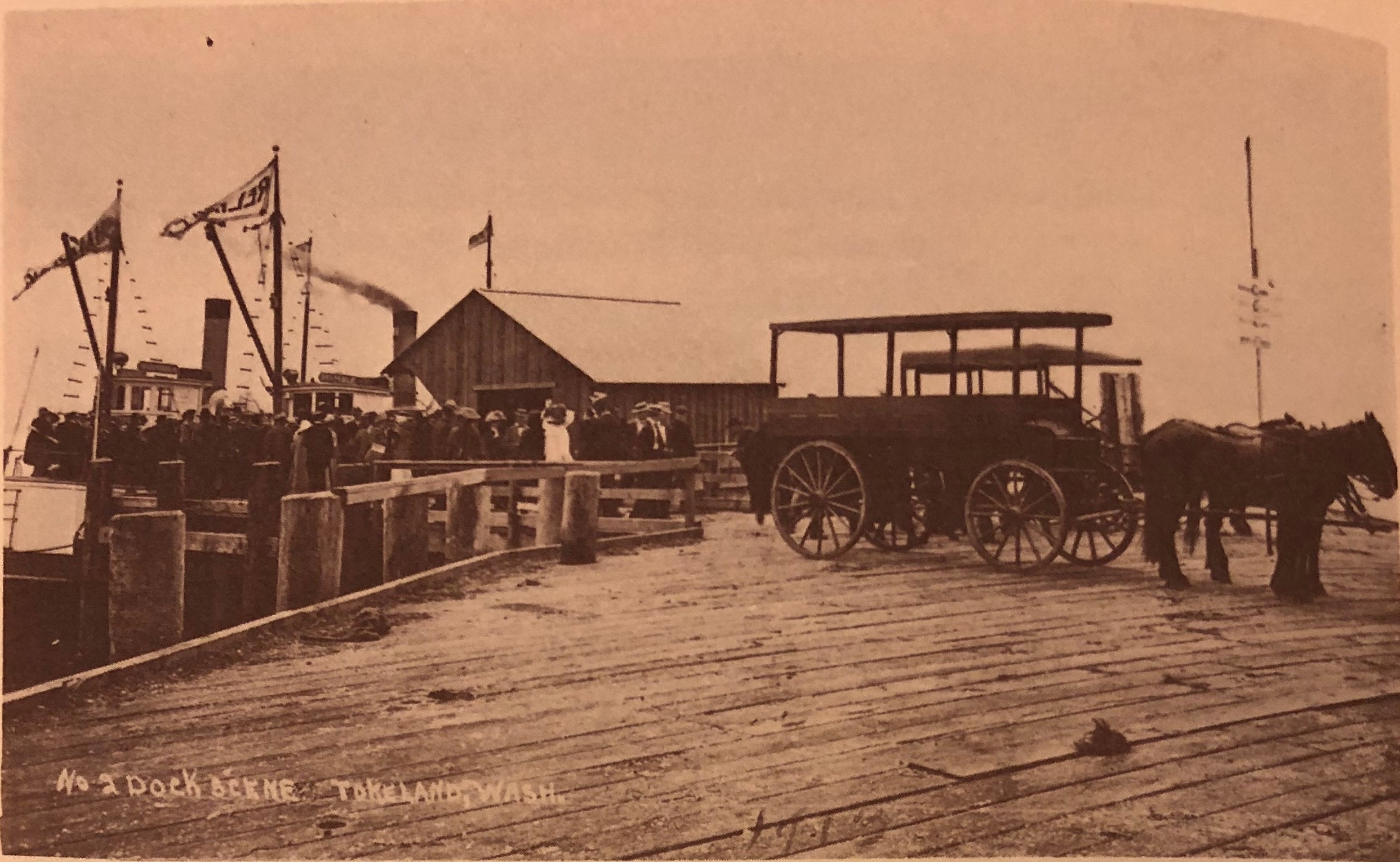
Meeting the steamer, Tokeland 1912

Vacationers from Seattle or Portland would travel by train to South Bend and then catch a ride on Captain A.W. Reed's steamers Reliable (launched in 1902) and Shamrock (added to Reed's fleet in 1906). Disembarking at the Tokeland dock, a horse drawn bus driven by William Kindred would take visitors the rest of the way to the Tokeland Hotel.

=== Natural disasters and The Great Depression ===
Between ocean storms and tornados that ravaged the peninsula between 1930 and 1934 and the Great Depression, Tokeland had difficulty recovering. While Tokeland Hotel survived, albeit damaged, many of the businesses that had shaped Tokeland’s tourist culture from the turn of the century were lost.

During these hard times, Lizzie and William hosted a celebration for their Golden Anniversary at the Tokeland Hotel. One year later in 1931, Lizzie died.

Maude ran the business and cared for William until 1939 when she also died. William Kindred, having no heirs to pass the property to, willed everything to the family's long-time caretaker and friend, Effie Reinkins. When William passed in 1943 it marked the end of the Kindred era of the Tokeland Hotel.

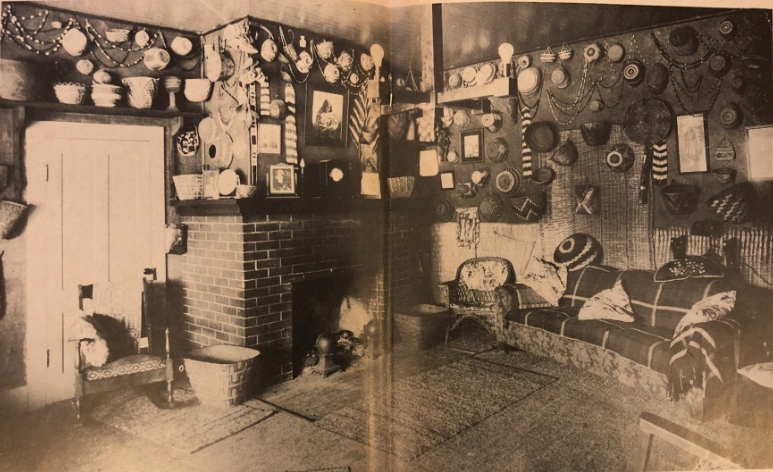
Lizzie Kindred's Tokeland Hotel Parlor Room with Native Baskets

=== Food and lodgings ===
The Tokeland Hotel contains thirty rooms, each with one large window. There are eighteen sleeping rooms on the second floor which are open to lodgers.

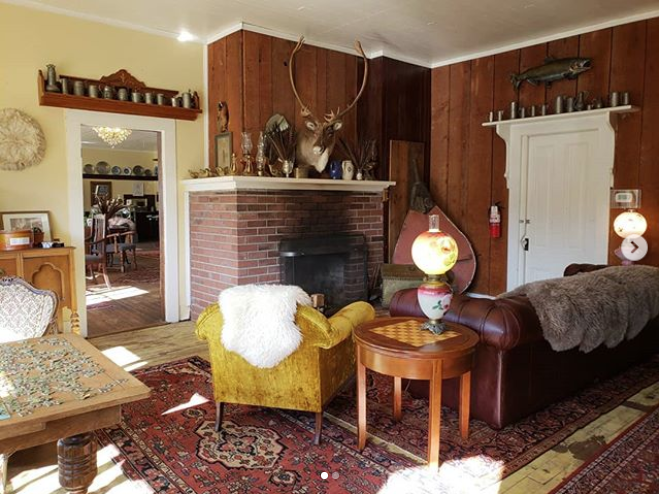
Tokeland Hotel Parlor 2019

During the Kindred years, Lizzie Kindred kept the parlor of the Tokeland Hotel decorated with a collection of beads and baskets, received as personal gifts over the years by friends and travelers. This collection was later donated to the University of Washington.

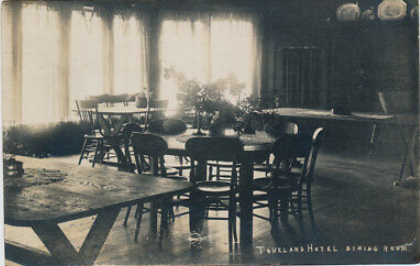
Tokeland Hotel Restaurant

In 1910, the Tokeland Hotel was famous for its cuisine of superb seafood and fresh produce from the Kindreds' backyard.

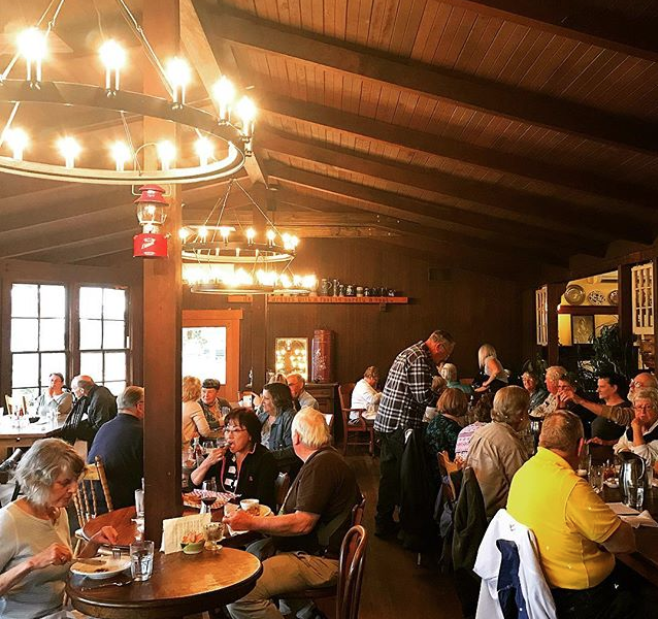
Tokeland Restaurant 2019

"The food was famous [during the time of the Kindreds]. The Kindred farm raised its own poultry and beef. The Indians kept the hotel supplied with freshly dug razor clams and prime crab. And the family remained in the oyster business even after the native oysters diminished and were replaced in 1899 by Eastern oyster plantings, and in the 1930s by the Japanese strains. Charlotte Brown, Lizzie Kindred, Lucy Carter, Effie Reinkins - housekeepers for half a century, were famous for their cooking."

The three decades that Katherine and Scott White ran the hotel (1989-2018), the Tokeland Hotel featured homemade blueberry pancakes and cranberry pot roast in the evening as well as an assortment of specialty pies. The current owners, Seattle restaurateurs Heather Earnhardt and Zac Young, offer a rotating breakfast, lunch and dinner menu continuing to feature Tokeland's fresh seafood and the hotel's signature Cranberry Pot Roast.

"It’s “Big Food Big Love,” as the title of [Heather Earnhardt's] 2016 cookbook puts it — including her famous fried chicken at breakfast, lunch and dinner. As befits historical Pacific Northwest coastal lodging — and as Earnhardt and Young befriend local, independent sources — there are oysters, Dungeness crab and more, fresh from right around the bay."

=== Local lore ===
The Tokeland Hotel lists on its website Rooms 4 and 7 as 'Haunted Rooms' and enthusiasts have regularly visited the Tokeland Hotel to test for paranormal activity.

One of several ghosts said to haunt the premises is known as "Charley", an immigrant from mainland China smuggled into the US to work on the railroads in the early 1900s. Having jumped ship and swum ashore, Charley fled the smugglers pursuing him. The Kindreds are said to have offered Charley a hiding place behind the parlor fireplace. But while waiting for the coast to clear, Charley died of suffocation and roams the hallways and sometimes spins dinner plates at the restaurant.

"I'm leaving with a sense that there are a lot of secrets hidden in the walls. I do feel like something's happened here" - Teresa Carol, clairvoyant

On the grounds of the Tokeland Hotel the headstones of Lizzie Kindred's half brothers can be found, brought over from the Cedar River cemetery as it was being washed away. One belongs to Albert Brown (April 1, 1856 - May 1, 1866) who, stuck in the mud in Teal Duck Slough, drowned as the tide came in when Lizzie Kindred was only three. The other belongs to Leonidus Norris (April 18, 1849 - April 8, 1873) who died in a shooting accident at 24.

10-year old Albert is rumored to haunt the halls of the hotel. Guests have also reported feeling a ghost cat pad across their bed.
