= Bear River (Washington) =

River in Washington State, United States

- Location of the mouth of the Bear River in Washington

Location
- Country: United States
- State: Washington
- County: Pacific

Physical characteristics
- Source: Bear Branch
  - location: Bear River Ridge
  - coordinates: 46°16′52″N 123°52′43″W
- Mouth
  - location: Willapa Bay
  - coordinates: 46°22′20″N 123°57′11″W
  - elevation: 0 ft (0 m)

The Bear River is a river in the U.S. state of Washington. Its upper reach is known as Bear Branch.

== Course ==
The Bear River, or Bear Branch, originates just north of the mouth of the Columbia River in the Bear River Range and Willapa Hills. It flows generally north and west, emptying into the southern end of Willapa Bay.

== See also ==
- List of rivers of Washington (state)
