= Niawiakum River =

River in the United States of America

- Location of the mouth of the Niawiakum River in Washington Niawiakum River (the United States)

Location
- Country: United States
- State: Washington
- County: Pacific

Physical characteristics
- Source: Willapa Hills
  - coordinates: 46°37′35″N 123°51′46″W
- Mouth: Willapa Bay
  - coordinates: 46°37′48″N 123°56′3″W
  - elevation: 0 ft (0 m)
- Length: 6 mi (9.7 km)

The Niawiakum River is a short river in the U.S. state of Washington. It is approximately 6 miles (9.7 km) long.

== Course ==
The Niawiakum River originates in the hills of the southwestern part of Washington. It flows generally west, emptying into Willapa Bay near Bay Center and the mouth of the Palix River. The river's entire length is only a few miles. The lower half of the Niawiakum River is a broad estuary and tidal marshland. U.S. Route 101 crosses the river near its mouth.

== History ==
The name "Niawiakum" derives from the Lower Chehalis name for the river.

== Natural history ==
838 acres (339 ha) of the lower river is a protected land preserve called the Niawiakum River Natural Area Preserve, yet most of the land is controlled by Weyerhaeuser which has resulted in significant clearcut logging and damage to the forest and river ecosystems. Two of the largest Western Red Cedar trees in the world, the Niawiakum Giant and the Seal Slough Cedar, sit on Weyerhaeuser land, however, surrounding clearcuts have nearly killed the Seal Slough Cedar. The river estuary and its tidal salt marsh vegetation is among the highest quality of the entire Washington and Oregon coasts. There are ongoing efforts to protect more of the Niawiakum estuary along with the nearby Bone River estuary.

== Geology ==
The lower Niawiakum River shows traces of the 1700 Cascadia earthquake and associated tsunami. Field trips to the river have been part of a Certificate Program in Tsunami Science and Preparedness offered by the University of Washington (UW) in cooperation with the National Oceanic and Atmospheric Administration (NOAA). The program was the first offered by the International Tsunami Training Institute, set up by NOAA in response to the Indian Ocean tsunami of 2004.

== See also ==
- List of rivers of Washington (state)
