= Willapa Hills =

Geologic, physiographic, and geographic region in southwest Washington, United States

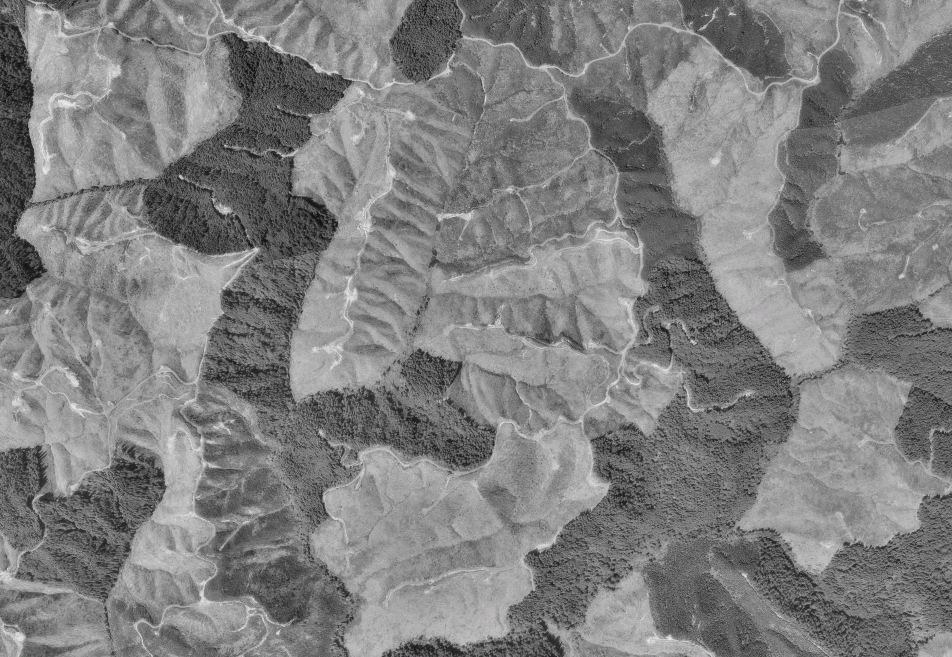
- Clearcutting in the Willapa Hills, Washington state.

Highest point
- Peak: Boistfort Peak
- Elevation: 949 m (3,114 ft)
- Coordinates: 46°29′17.3″N 123°12′55.1″W

Geography
- Location within Washington (state)
- Country: United States
- State: Washington
- Region: Western Washington
- Hills: Black Hills; Doty Hills
- Parent range: Pacific Coast Ranges
- Borders on: Columbia River; Olympic Mountains; Pacific Ocean; Cascade Range

The Willapa Hills is a geologic, physiographic, and geographic region in southwest Washington. When described as a physiographical province, the Willapa Hills are bounded by the Pacific Ocean to the west, the Columbia River to the south, the Olympic Mountains to the north, and the Cascade Range to the east. Some definitions place the Puget Lowland physiographic province east of the Willapa Hills. Included within the province are the Black Hills, the Doty Hills, and a number of broad river valleys, some of which open up into broad estuaries on the Pacific such as Grays Harbor and Willapa Bay. Other definitions do not include the Black Hills. The USGS GNIS defines the Willapa Hills as bounded by the Columbia River to the south and the Chehalis River to the north, without giving specific east and west bounds. The Willapa Hills are one of the Pacific Coast Ranges, which continue north as the Olympic Mountains and south, across the Columbia River, as the Oregon Coast Range.

The highest point is 3,087-foot (941 m) Boistfort Peak. The Willapa Hills are the lowest uplands in the entire Pacific Coast Range system. Almost all of the land is privately held, and has been repeatedly logged. Only a few long corners remain with virgin forest. Alders that are less than twenty years old are typically harvested for pulp mills.

Areas of the Willapa Hills receive over 100 inches rain per year resulting in areas of temperate rainforests. A number of rivers originate in the region, including the Chehalis River, Willapa River, North River, Bone River, Niawiakum River, Palix River, Bear River, Naselle River, Grays River, and Elochoman River, among others.

== See also ==
- List of geographic features in Lewis County, Washington
