= Dexter by the Sea, Washington =

Unincorporated community in Washington, United States

Dexter by the Sea
- Unincorporated community
- Location within the state of Washington
- Coordinates: 46°43′16″N 124°00′50″W
- Country: United States
- State: Washington
- County: Pacific
- Elevation: 13 ft (4.0 m)
- Time zone: UTC-8 (Pacific (PST))
  - Summer (DST): UTC-7 (PDT)
- GNIS feature ID: 1504467

Dexter by the Sea is a small unincorporated community, adjacent to Tokeland, in Pacific County, Washington, United States.
