= Frederick Copenspire =

Washington State pioneer, politician, and businessman (1868–1908)

Frederick H. Copenspire
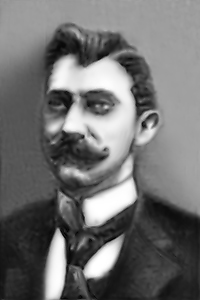
- Born: 1868; Erie County, New York
- Died: 1908 (aged 39–40)
- Burial place: Greenwood Cemetery, Oil Creek Township, Pennsylvania
- Occupations: Pacific County Assessor and Treasurer; mayor of South Bend, Washington; cigar merchant and manufacturer; American Oil Works agent; real estate businessman
- Organization: Knights of Pythias
- Known for: Was one of the first Pacific County Assessors and South Bend Mayor, one of the historic figures of the city, who spurred its commercial growth. Was highly esteemed as cigar merchant and manufacturer.
- Political party: Democratic

Frederick H. Copenspire (1868–1908) was a Washington State pioneer, politician, and businessman who lived in South Bend. Copenspire was one of the first Pacific County assessors, and one of the few Democrats elected to this position at a time of Republican popularity. Copenspire also served as mayor of South Bend for several years. His house was added to the list of the landmarks in the city's historic tour.

Сopenspire came to Washington State in 1890, settling in Tacoma. He worked as a merchant in the cigar trade for a year, and then moved to South Bend, where he opened his own cigar factory. He ran the business until a fire in 1892 destroyed the factory. Copenspire received insurance for his property, but the economic Depression in the U.S. in 1893 kept him from re-opening. Eventually he restarted his business and became one of the leading businessmen in the field. He benefitted considerably from the Alaskan Gold Rush of 1896–1899, and later erected a new cigar factory in South Bend. His cigars became a permanent product on the market, and were considered more popular than the foreign imports of that time. Copenspire was known as one of the most active businessmen of the city, influencing its commercial growth. In 1966, his cigars were a part of the Pacific County Fair historical exhibition in Menlo.

Copenspire worked in the petroleum oil business for several years. Growing up in Titusville during the Pennsylvania oil rush, he had gained a vast knowledge of the business. He represented the American Oil Works company, which competed with the Standard Oil. Over the years, he invested in South Bend real estate, and had valuable pieces of property both as an individual owner and in partnership with others. He and four other investors worked in the Leonard & Myers company, which owned a vast array of property on the city waterfront.

== Early life and family ==
Copenspire was born in 1868 on a family farm in Erie County, New York, 18 miles away from Buffalo. His German ancestors had come to America in 1835, settling near Hamburg in Erie County. Copenspire family members lived there and in the neighboring village of East Eden, owning the family farms for decades. Copenspire's parents were Frederick Copenspire and Katherine Copenspire (Rittman), both born in Erie county; they had five children.

In 1869–1870, during the Pennsylvania oil rush, the family moved to Titusville, Pennsylvania. By that time, the oil industry there was well established, and Copenspire's father worked as a prospector. He worked in the oil industry for many years and was a well-known citizen of Titusville.

== Education ==
From an early age, Copenspire combined different jobs with his education. He studied in the second ward school of Titusville; among his schoolmates was Ida Tarbell, later a successful investigative journalist, biographer, and lecturer who wrote The History of the Standard Oil Company. After school, Copenspire started learning the harness-making trade, and afterwards worked in a cigar store, learning the cigar-making trade.

== Career in Washington state ==
=== Cigar business in Tacoma and South Bend ===
Copenspire came to Tacoma in the spring of 1890, and started to work in the cigar trade as a merchant. In December of that year, he moved to South Bend and opened his own cigar factory with an agency in Olean, New York. He led a "flourishing business" until the factory burned down in March 1892. It was the first ever fire in South Bend, and resulted in the loss of $3,500 ($92,000 in 2020 dollars (Note: The approximate value converted to 2020 dollars, based on a standard adjustment of the 1913 dollar value using the Consumer Price Index as calculated by United States Department of Labor.)) in buildings and stocks. The sum was partially covered by insurance, of which Copenspire received $700 ($18,000). Due to the economic stagnation of 1893, Copenspire couldn't re-start his business, and started to work for American Oil Works.

=== American Oil Works ===
Copenspire had wide knowledge of the petroleum oil industry. After the cigar business failed, he became a South Bend representative for an independent refinery in Titusville, the American Oil Works company. Copenspire introduced their product, Sunlight Oil, to the local stores, showing its advantages over Standard Oil's product. Both products were priced the same, but Copenspire won over a vast array of clients. For several years he "enjoyed a profitable business," but later, when the company couldn't compete with Standard Oil anymore, the agency closed.

=== Cigar business reset ===
Eventually, Copenspire returned to his original interest: the cigar business. By 1903, he became "one of the representative men of this section." During the Alaskan Gold Rush of 1896–1899, he "made a fortune" providing the cigars to miners.

In 1900, during a building boom in South Bend, Copenspire erected a two-story building. He located his cigar factory on the first floor, leaving the second for the Knights of Pythias fraternity purposes. The factory had many employees, and with time, Copenspire's brand gained a permanent place on the market. Locally, his cigars were more popular than imports.

Copenspire was considered one of the most active businessmen of the city, helping to spur its commercial growth. For many years, he was known and remembered in historical pieces as a "prominent cigar maker." In 1966, cigars he manufactured were a part of the Pacific County Fair exhibition in Menlo, aimed at the portraying the old settlers of the county and their lifestyle.

=== Other activity ===
By 1903, Copenspire had individually invested in South Bend properties. He was also one of five heads of a company in South Bend called Leonard & Myers, which owned some of "the most valuable property on the water-front."

== Political life ==
Copenspire supported the Democratic political party. In 1898, he became one of the first Pacific County assessors, and in 1900 was re-elected for another two-year term. Copenspire was one of very few Democratic members elected assessor during a time when the county was "strongly Republican." In 1900, Copenspire was elected mayor of South Bend, serving in 1901 and again in 1903. In 1902, he was also the county treasurer.

== Memberships ==
Copenspire had an active social life and was a member of the Knights of Pythias order. He provided a space for the order in his factory building in South Bend, turning the second floor of the building into fraternity lodge rooms.

== Personal life and death ==
Copenspire's house was built at 519 2nd Street, South Bend. In 1911, it was one of the first houses supplied with electricity. Later, the building became a landmark in the historic tour of the city.

As of 1903, Copenspire was not married. He died in 1908.

== See also ==
- South Bend, Washington
- Titusville
- Standard Oil
- Ida Tarbell

== Literature cited ==
- "CPI Inflation Calculator", Bureau of Labor Statistics, Washington: United States Department of Labor
- "Fire at South Bend", Seattle Post-Intelligencer, Seattle: Leigh S. J. Hunt, p. 1, March 6, 1892, ISSN 2379-7304, LCCN sn83045604, OCLC 9563195
- Directory and reference book of the tobacco trade, New York: Delano, 1893, OCLC 25123047
- Blethen, Alden J., ed. (October 19, 1901), "Pacific county", Seattle Daily Times, Seattle: The Seattle Times Company, p. 27, ISSN 2639-4898, LCCN sn86072007, OCLC 1765328
- "Brevities", Titusville Herald, Titusville: Bloss Bros. & Cogswell, p. 3, January 31, 1902, LCCN sn85038408, OCLC 12396338
- Blethen, Alden J., ed. (February 8, 1902), "Several men representing neighboring counties here", Seattle Daily Times, Seattle: The Seattle Times Company, p. 5, ISSN 2639-4898, LCCN sn86072007, OCLC 1765328
- Wilhelm, Honor L., ed. (January 1, 1903), "Pacific County, Washington", The Coast, vol. V, no. 1, Seattle: The Metropolitan Press, Inc., pp. 27–34, LCCN 05032197, OCLC 890484899
- "Inheritance tax receipts – General fund", Biennial Report of the State Treasurer to the State Legislature (11 ed.), Olympia: E. L. Boardman, pp. 13–22, 1910, LCCN 2005216516, OCLC 11275245
- "Receipts for inheritance tax for the biennial period October 1, 1908, to September 30, 1910", Third biennial report of the State Board of Tax Commissioners (3 ed.), Olympia: E. L. Boardman, pp. 35–44, 1911, LCCN 07027307, OCLC 40373419
- Bloss, Joseph M., ed. (August 7, 1915), "Frederick Copenspire died this morning", Titusville Herald, Titusville: Bloss Bros. & Cogswell, p. 2, LCCN sn85038408, OCLC 12396338
- Dixon, Harold C.; Laughlin, Jack, eds. (1966), "70th Anniversary salute to the Pacific County fair to be held August 25, 26 and 27, 1966, at Menlo", The Sou'wester, vol. 1, no. 2, South Bend: Pacific County Historical Society, ISSN 0038-4984, OCLC 881087513
- McCausland, Ruth; Mann, Joan, eds. (1998), ""Pioneer" Grocery Store Building Has Interesting History", The Sou'wester, vol. XXXIII, no. 4, South Bend: Pacific County Historical Society, pp. 8–9, ISSN 0038-4984, OCLC 881087513
- Bernosky, Frank, ed. (September 5, 2020), "Copenspire, Fred H.", ccggpa.net, Meadville: Crawford County Genealogy Gateway
- DeMontigny, Aaron (December 1, 2014), Walking Tours of Historic South Bend, Washington, Pacific County: Pacific County Historical Society
- Krout, Jay Y. (1902), United States Directory of Cigar Manufacturers, Leaf Tobacco Importers, Packers and Dealers (PDF), Philadelphia, LCCN 02019399, OCLC 39275091
- Prosser, William Farrand (1903), Lewis, Edward Gardner (ed.), A history of the Puget Sound country, its resources, its commerce and its people, New York City: Edward Gardner Lewis, LCCN 05013767
