= North River (Washington) =

American river

Coordinates: 46°44′44″N 123°53′26″W

The North River is a river, approximately 30 miles (48 km) long, in western Washington, in the United States. It empties into Willapa Bay, the first large estuary on the Washington coast north of the Columbia River.

The river rises in the Willapa Hills in northeastern Pacific County and flows northwest into Grays Harbor County. The river turns southwest where it is crossed by US 101, reenters Pacific County, and reaches Willapa Bay at State Route 105, twelve miles northwest of Raymond.

Much of the North River's drainage basin is within the Weyerhaeuser Twin Harbors Tree Farm.

== See also ==
- List of rivers of Washington (state)
