= Shoalwater Bay Indian Tribe =

Federally recognized Indian tribe in Washington state, U.S.

- Seal

- Location of the Shoalwater Bay Indian Tribe in Washington state
- Headquarters: 2373 Old Tokeland Road, Tokeland, Washington (46°43′22″N 124°01′33″W)
- Ethnic groups: Lower Chehalis; Willapa Chinook
- Demonyms: Shoalwater/Willapa Bay Indians; Georgetown Indians
- Enrolled citizens: 373 (2016)
- Government: Tribal Council
  - Chairman: Quinton Swanson
  - Vice chairman: Shane Thomas
  - Secretary: Lynn Clark
  - Treasurer: Joel Blake
  - Member at-large: Dennis Julnes

Domestic dependent nation within the United States
  - Reservation created: September 22, 1866
  - Recognized: March 10, 1971

The Shoalwater Bay Indian Tribe is a federally recognized Native American tribe in Pacific County, Washington, United States. The tribe is descended from the Lower Chehalis and the Willapa (Shoalwater) Chinook peoples. In 2016, the tribe had 373 enrolled citizens.

The Shoalwater Bay Tribe governs the Shoalwater Bay Indian Reservation. Its tribal headquarters is in Tokeland, Washington.

== History ==
The Shoalwater Bay Tribe is descended from the Shoalwater Bay Indians, a term used to refer to the multiple peoples whose homelands are in Willapa Bay (formerly known as Shoalwater Bay), including the Lower Chehalis and the Willapa Chinook, as well as others.

In 1855, the Shoalwater Bay Indians attended the signing of the Chehalis River Treaty. Leaders of the tribes living in Willapa Bay refused to sign the treaty, returning to their lands to continue their traditional lifestyles. Eleven years later, on September 22, 1866, Andrew Johnson issued an executive order that created a reservation at nám̓sč̓ac̓, the location of a former Lower Chehalis village. By this time, thirty to forty Indian families remained at Willapa Bay. The order set aside a 334.75 acres (1.3547 km^{2}) tract of land for "miscellaneous Indian purposes," essentially allowing the Shoalwater Bay peoples to retain a land base without having signed any treaty.

From 1899 to 1936, the chief of the Shoalwater Bay Indian Tribe was George A. Charley, one of the last people in the region to have a flattened head (as was the custom for noble families in the Pacific Northwest). His father, Charley Toke, was appointed chief before him.

Throughout the first half of the 20th century, the Shoalwater Bay Indian Tribe remained unrecognized by the federal government. In the 1960s, negotiations began between the Shoalwater Bay Indians and the United States. Eventually, on March 10, 1971, the Shoalwater Bay Indian Tribe was recognized by the US government, maintaining their sovereignty. The Shoalwater Bay Tribe adopted their constitution shortly after, on May 22.

In 1984, the tribe relinquished its claim to eight acres (3.2 ha) of land given by the US government to an American citizen in 1872. The tribe was given $1,000,000 for the claim.

Between 1988 and 1998, the tribe went through a health crisis in which an alarming number of pregnancies, between 25 and 66 percent, were resulting in stillbirths, miscarriages, and infant deaths. No cause was ever officially identified, although it was associated with a lack of prenatal care. The crisis resulted in increased awareness and federal funding for tribal members' health care.

In February 2006, the American Museum of Natural History in New York was issued a NAGPRA notice, as they held the remains of eight people who were likely of Shoalwater origin.

The Shoalwater Bay Indian Tribe built the first free-standing vertical tsunami evacuation structure in North America, using federal funding. The 50-foot (15 m) tower in Tokeland opened in 2022 and is able to accommodate over 400 people. The tribe received a $25 million grant in 2025 to finance the relocation of its buildings uphill from sea level due to predicted threats of tsunamis and sea level rise. The grant will fund the construction of new housing for tribal members.

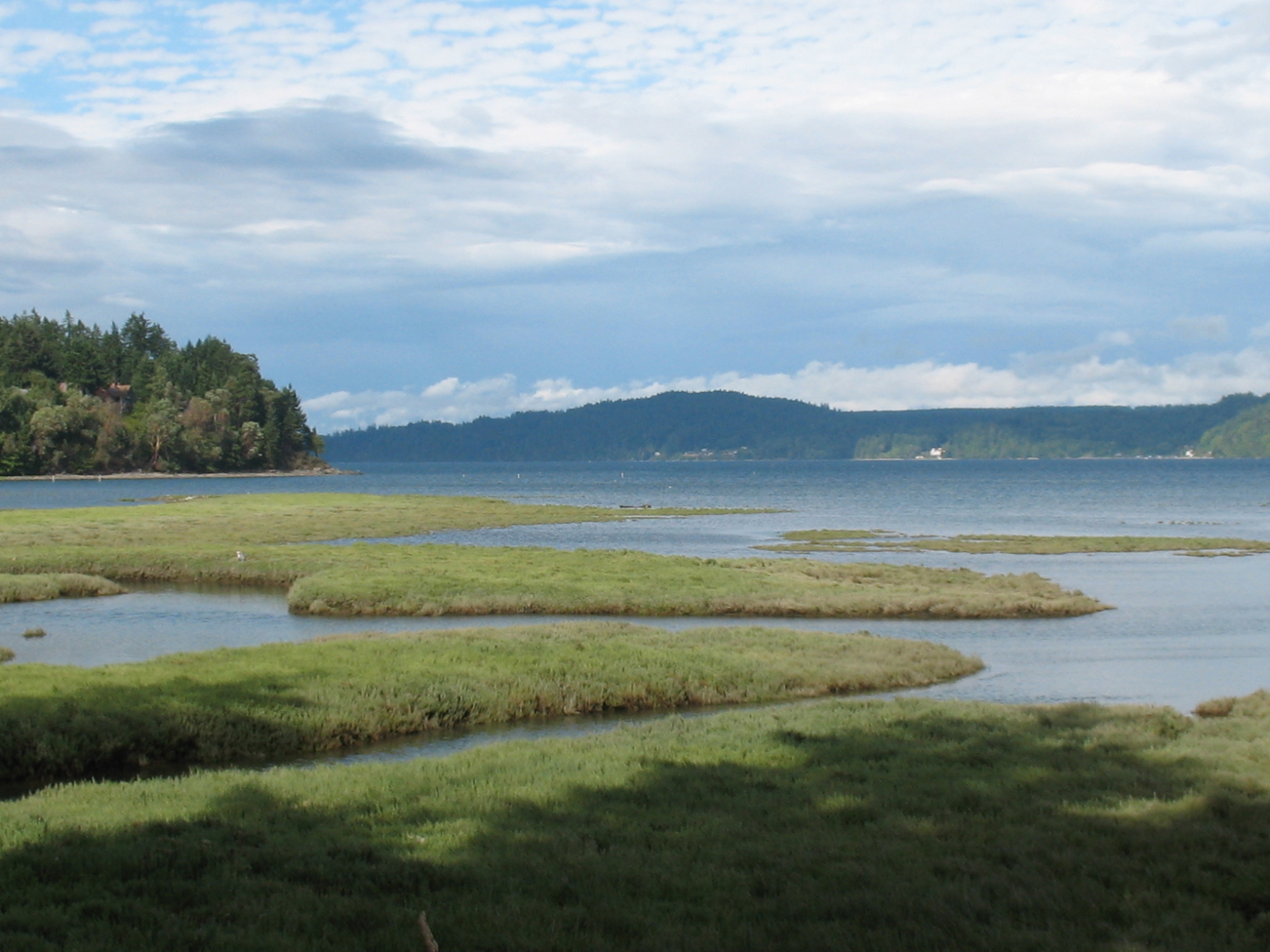
Willapa Bay, formerly known as Shoalwater Bay

== Government ==
The Shoalwater Bay Indian Tribe is governed by the General Council, which consists of all enrolled members 18 years of age or older. The Tribal Council is a five-member elected body which is responsible for the day-to-day administration of the tribe. Additionally, the Tribal Council employs a Tribal Administrator who oversees administrative duties as well as managing the 29 departments of the government.

As of September 2024, the members of the Tribal Council are as follows:

- Chairman: Quinton Swanson
- Vice chairman: Shane Thomas
- Secretary: Lynn Clark
- Treasurer: Joel Blake
- Dennis Julnes

== Shoalwater Bay Indian Reservation ==
The Shoalwater Bay Indian Reservation is the reservation of the Shoalwater Bay Indian Tribe, located west of Tokeland on the southwest coast of Washington in northwestern Pacific County, along the northern shores of Willapa Bay. The reservation is 2.693 km^{2} (1.0397 sq mi) large. It had 70 residents in 2000. In 2020, 82 people lived on the reservation.

The reservation was established in 1866.

In 2010, there were "about half a dozen" Indigenous families living on the reservation. As of 2020, the reservation has 32 households living in 41 housing units. Sixty percent of the reservation population is employed, and 80.4 percent have health care coverage. Only 3.6 percent have earned a bachelor's degree or higher.

== Economy and services ==
The tribe operates the Shoalwater Bay Casino, which opened in 1998. The tribe also operates a police force, library, wellness center, oyster company, and a recreation center.

Many tribal members work in nearby cranberry bogs and in the fishing and crabbing industries. Children attend school in the nearby community of Ocosta. In the 1990s, the tribe ranked as one of the poorest in the state, with ninety percent of tribal members living below the poverty line.

The Shoalwater Bay Indian Tribe is part of the Northwest Portland Area Indian Health Board. They provide medical care for American Indian and Alaska Native people, as well as local non-Native people. Their tribal clinic serves 890 people.

== Demographics ==
The Shoalwater Bay Tribe is one of the smallest tribes in Washington state. In 2016, there were 373 citizens of the Shoalwater Bay Indian Tribe. In 2005, there were 207 members. In 1992, there were 134 members. In 1985, there were 64 enrolled members. About "half a dozen" of the enrolled members lived on the reservation around 2010.

== Culture ==
The ancestral tribes of Willapa Bay relied heavily on canoes for transport, and were regarded as expert canoers. Canoes stopped being produced by members of the tribe in the late 19th century. On August 23, 2008, the Shoalwater Bay tribe built canoes for the first time since the 1800s, participating in the Tribal Canoe Journeys with the Chinook Indian Nation and Confederated Tribes of the Grande Ronde from Toke Point to Bay Center.

=== Language ===
Historically, the peoples of Willapa Bay spoke Lower Chinook, Lower Chehalis, and likely Kwalhioqua-Clatskanie, an Athabaskan language. By 1879, the peoples of Shoalwater Bay spoke Lower Chehalis, a Salishan (Coast/Tsamosan) language.

== Bibliography ==
- Ruby, Robert H.; Brown, John A.; Collins, Cary C. (2010). A Guide to the Indian Tribes of the Pacific Northwest. Civilization of the American Indian. Vol. 173 (3rd ed.). Norman: University of Oklahoma Press. ISBN 9780806124797.
