= Long Island (Washington) =

Island in Washington state, US

Coordinates: 46.45205°N 123.96423°W

Long Island is an uninhabited island lying in the southern part of Willapa Bay in Pacific County, Washington, United States. It is the site of the Willapa National Wildlife Refuge, part of the U.S. National Wildlife Refuge System. The island has a land area of 21.666 km^{2} (8.365 sq mi).

== See also ==
- Long Island, New York
