= Nahcotta, Washington =

Unincorporated community in Pacific County, Washington, United States

Coordinates: 46°29′54″N 124°2′0″W

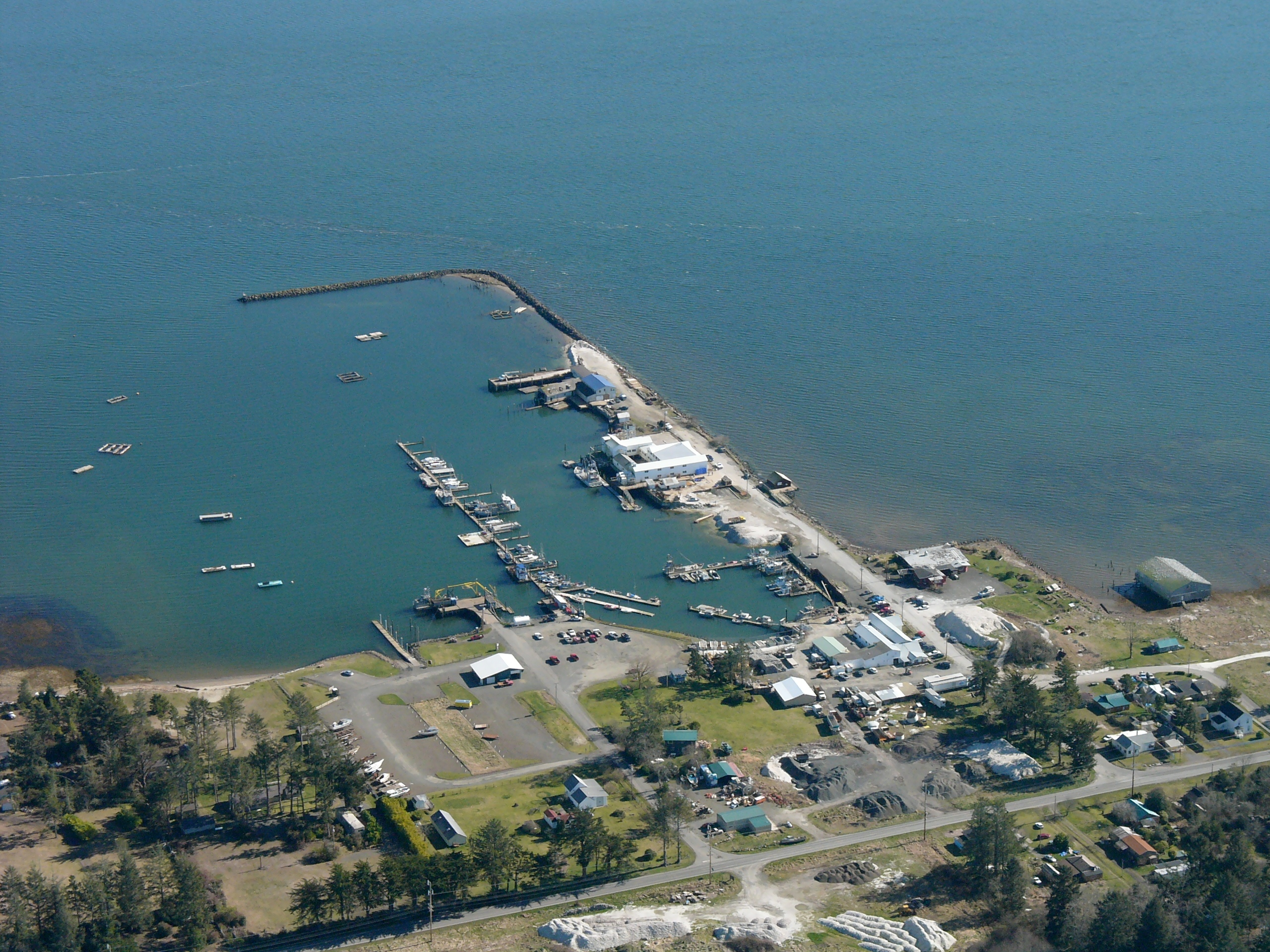
Aerial view of Nahcotta, Washington

Nahcotta is an unincorporated community in Pacific County, Washington, United States. It is located on Willapa Bay, on the eastern coast of the Long Beach Peninsula, within the Ocean Park CDP.

== History ==
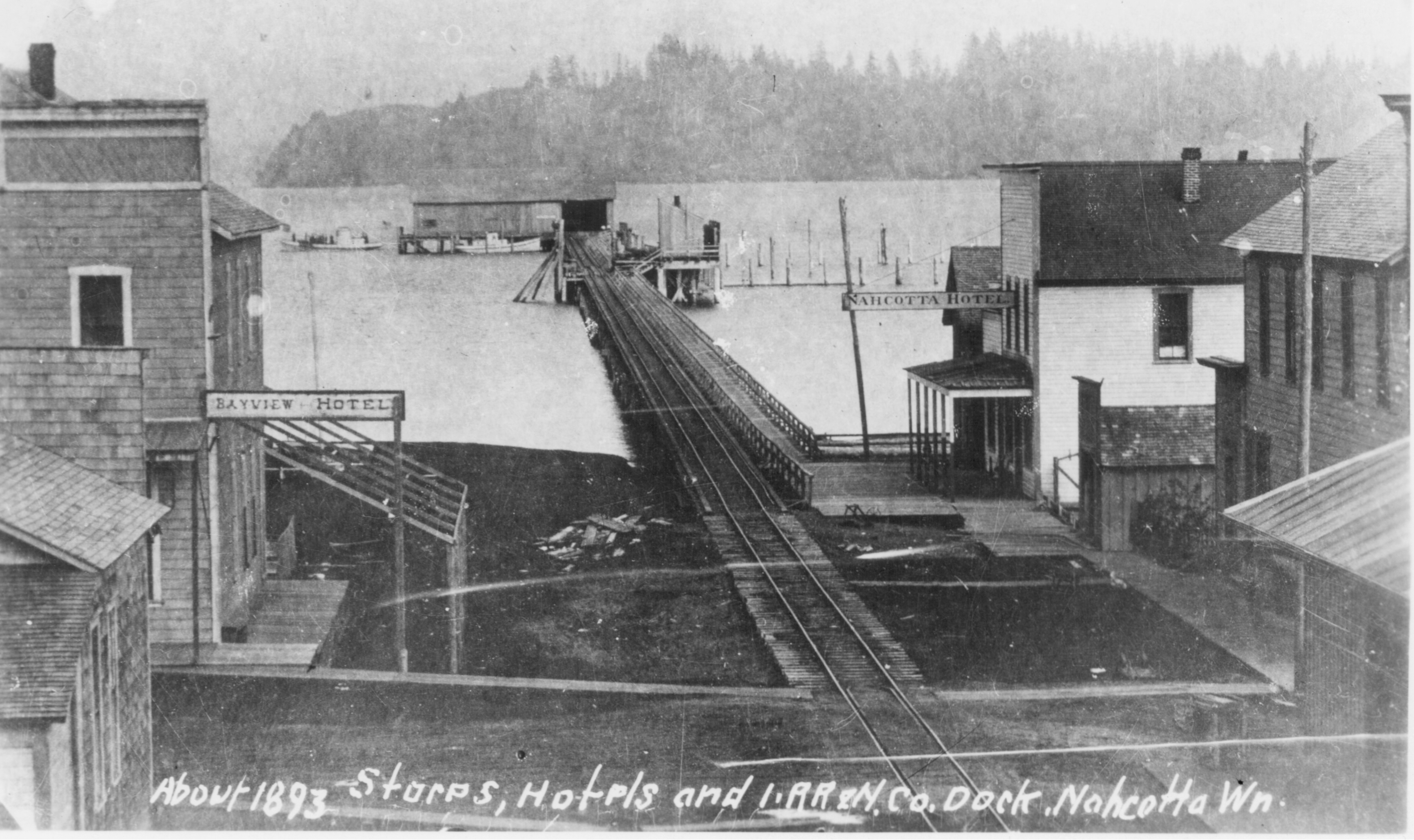
Nahcotta, WA 1893

Nahcotta was first settled in 1890 by J.A. Morehead and named for Nahcati, the chief of a local Chinook tribe. Nahcotta was once the northern terminal of the Ilwaco Railway and Navigation Company, a narrow gauge railroad which ran from Ilwaco, and later from Megler, in southwestern Pacific County, up the Long Beach Peninsula to Nahcotta and back, once a day. The railroad was in operation from 1889 to 1930.

The community had a small contract post office that opened in 1889 and was maintained by a pair of local residents out of a small building. The post office was closed on February 27, 2021, after a request from the operators for additional funds was denied by the United States Postal Service.

== See also ==
- Steamboats of Willapa Bay
