= Tokeland, Washington =

- CDP
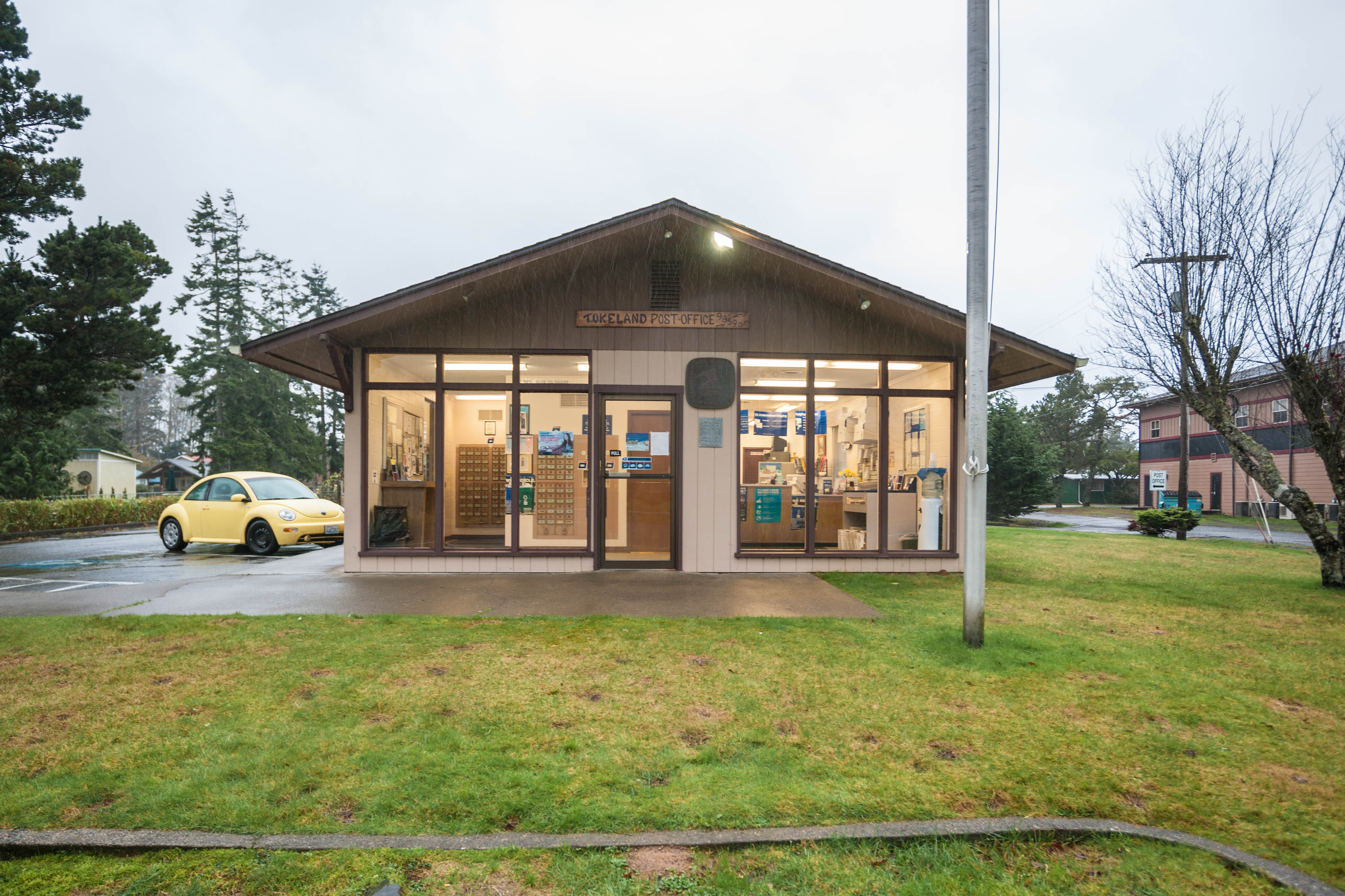
- Post office in Tokeland

- Location of Tokeland, Washington
- Coordinates: 46°42′32″N 123°59′00″W
- Country: United States
- State: Washington
- County: Pacific

Area
  - Total: 0.50 sq mi (1.3 km^{2})
  - Land: 0.50 sq mi (1.3 km^{2})
  - Water: 0 sq mi (0.0 km^{2})
- Elevation: 10 ft (3.0 m)

Population (2020)
  - Total: 158
  - Density: 310/sq mi (120/km^{2})
- Time zone: UTC-8 (Pacific (PST))
  - Summer (DST): UTC-7 (PDT)
- ZIP Code: 98590
- Area code(s): 360, 564
- FIPS code: 53-71680
- GNIS feature ID: 2409329

Tokeland is a census-designated place (CDP) in Pacific County, Washington, United States. The population was 158 at the 2020 census, a slight increase from 151 at the 2010 census. It is located on the north side of Willapa Bay near the Shoalwater Bay Indian Reservation.

The town was named after Chief Toke, an chief of the Shoalwater Bay Indian Tribe during the 19th century.

== History ==
Tokeland is named after Chief Toke of the Shoalwater Bay Tribe. Toke made the area a summer home for himself and his family, and his presence was first documented there by Lieutenant John Meares after Toke approached Meares' ship in his canoe at the mouth of Willapa Bay in 1788.

In 1854, J. F. Barrows settled on Toke Point, but left only a few years later. No other known settlers appeared in the area until the arrival of George Brown in 1858. In 1885, Brown's daughter Lizzie, and her husband, William Kindred, built a home that became the Kindred Inn, and eventually as the Tokeland Hotel. When the town's first post office was established in 1894, the Kindreds operated it, and continued doing so for 17 years. Lizzie Kindred was also partial owner of the Tokeland Oyster Company when it opened in 1905.

Tokeland became a popular enough destination that in 1910, a group of investors from Portland, Oregon sought to develop an amusement park there that would resemble Coney Island, although these plans never materialized.

Similarly to North Cove and other towns on the north side of Willapa Bay, coastal erosion became a serious concern for Tokeland. This, combined with the overall economic pressure affecting the nation during The Great Depression, caused a decline in the area's tourism industry in the 1930s and 1940s. The area's economy received a small boost starting in the 1950s, as recreational boating and fishing, combined with a surge in once-dwindling oyster harvests, rekindled many businesses. This led to the Port of Willapa Harbor making many improvements to Tokeland, including the 1974 addition of a new jetty, moorage, boat ramp, timber seawall, and fish buying station.

=== Tsunami evacuation tower ===
The Shoalwater Bay Indian Tribe built a 50-foot tall (15 m) tsunami evacuation tower in 2022. The freestanding structure was built at a cost $5 million, $1.2 million supplied by the tribal council and an additional $3.8 million from the Federal Emergency Management Agency (FEMA). The tower is considered the first of its type in the United States. In honor of tribal elder Lee Shipman who guided the project to completion, the council bestowed the tower the nickname, "Auntie Lee".

== Geography ==
Tokeland is located in Willapa Bay, by the mouth of the Cedar River. According to the United States Census Bureau, the CDP has a total area of 0.5 square miles (1.3 km^{2}), all of it land.

=== Tsunami and inland flooding ===
During early talks to build a tsunami evacuation tower, studies were undertaken by the Shoalwater Bay Indian Tribe, in conjunction with several local, state, and federal agencies, that determined the Tokeland area could be hit by a tsunami 10-foot tall (3.0 m) within a range of 10 to 22 minutes after an ensuing high-magnitude earthquake.

Construction on the tsunami evacuation tower, which is the first of its kind in the United States, was finished in 2022. It was nicknamed "Auntie Lee Tower" in honor of Tribal elder Lee Shipman who led the Tribe's effort to obtain funding and build the tower. The tower's design drew inspiration from nearby Ocosta Elementary School, which also doubles as a tsunami evacuation structure.

== Climate ==
This region experiences warm (but not hot) and dry summers, with no average monthly temperatures above 71.6 °F. According to the Köppen Climate Classification system, Tokeland has a warm-summer Mediterranean climate, abbreviated "Csb" on climate maps.

== Demographics ==
Historical population
Census	Pop.	Note	%±
2000	194		—
2010	151		−22.2%
2020	158		4.6%
U.S. Decennial Census; 1990 2000 2010 2020

Tokeland first appeared as a census designated place in the 2000 U.S. census.

=== Racial and ethnic composition ===
Tokeland CDP, Washington – Racial and ethnic composition Note: the US Census treats Hispanic/Latino as an ethnic category. This table excludes Latinos from the racial categories and assigns them to a separate category. Hispanics/Latinos may be of any race.
Race / Ethnicity (NH = Non-Hispanic)	Pop 2000	Pop 2010	Pop 2020	% 2000	% 2010	% 2020
White alone (NH)	175	138	114	90.21%	91.39%	72.15%
Black or African American alone (NH)	0	0	1	0.00%	0.00%	0.63%
Native American or Alaska Native alone (NH)	11	8	17	5.67%	5.30%	10.76%
Asian alone (NH)	2	0	3	1.03%	0.00%	1.90%
Native Hawaiian or Pacific Islander alone (NH)	0	1	0	0.00%	0.66%	0.00%
Other race alone (NH)	0	0	0	0.00%	0.00%	0.00%
Mixed race or Multiracial (NH)	6	0	12	3.09%	0.00%	7.59%
Hispanic or Latino (any race)	0	4	11	0.00%	2.65%	6.96%
Total	194	151	158	100.00%	100.00%	100.00%

=== 2020 census ===
As of the 2020 census there were 158 people, 171 housing units, and 70 families in the CDP. There were 116 White people, 1 African American, 17 Native Americans, 3 Asians, 2 people from some other race, and 19 people from two or more races. 11 people were of Hispanic or Latino origin.

The ancestry of Tokeland was 15.1% Polish, 9.8% Norwegian, 5.9% Irish, and 3.9% German.

The median age was 37 years old. 29.3% of the population spoke a language at home that was a 'other' language, i.e. not English, Spanish, nor Indo-European or an asian language. 24.9% of the population were older than 65, with 20% being between the ages of 65 and 74, and 4.9% being older than 85.

The median household income was $19,167, and married couples had $28,611. 23.9% of the population were older than 65.

=== 2000 census ===
As of the census of 2000, there were 194 people, 89 households, and 50 families residing in the CDP. The population density was 379.0 people per square mile (146.9/km^{2}). There were 197 housing units at an average density of 384.8/sq mi (149.1/km^{2}). The racial makeup of the CDP was 90.21% White, 5.67% Native American, 1.03% Asian, and 3.09% from two or more races. 43.0% were of American, 14.5% Irish, 9.2% French and 5.7% Finnish ancestry according to Census 2000.

There were 89 households, out of which 21.3% had children under the age of 18 living with them, 43.8% were married couples living together, 7.9% had a female householder with no husband present, and 43.8% were non-families. 38.2% of all households were made up of individuals, and 20.2% had someone living alone who was 65 years of age or older. The average household size was 2.18 and the average family size was 2.84.

In the CDP, the population was spread out, with 20.1% under the age of 18, 5.7% from 18 to 24, 18.0% from 25 to 44, 34.5% from 45 to 64, and 21.6% who were 65 years of age or older. The median age was 48 years. For every 100 females, there were 106.4 males. For every 100 females age 18 and over, there were 106.7 males.

The median income for a household in the CDP was $24,531, and the median income for a family was $30,208. Males had a median income of $14,327 versus $0 for females. The per capita income for the CDP was $12,170. About 39.0% of families and 49.1% of the population were below the poverty line, including 83.3% of those under the age of eighteen and none of those 65 or over.

== Arts and culture ==
Tokeland is home to the Tokeland Hotel, recognized as the oldest such venue in the state. Built in 1899 as an addition to an existing farmhouse, the hotel began as the Kindred Inn and was added to the National Register of Historic Places in 1978.

== See also ==
- Steamboats of Willapa Bay
- Willapa Bay
