= Steamboats of Willapa Bay =

Voyages on willapa bay

Willapa Bay is a large shallow body of water near the Pacific Ocean in southwestern Washington. For a number of years before modern roads were built in Pacific County, Washington, the bay was used as the means of travel around the county, by powered and unpowered craft, including several steamboats.

== Operations ==
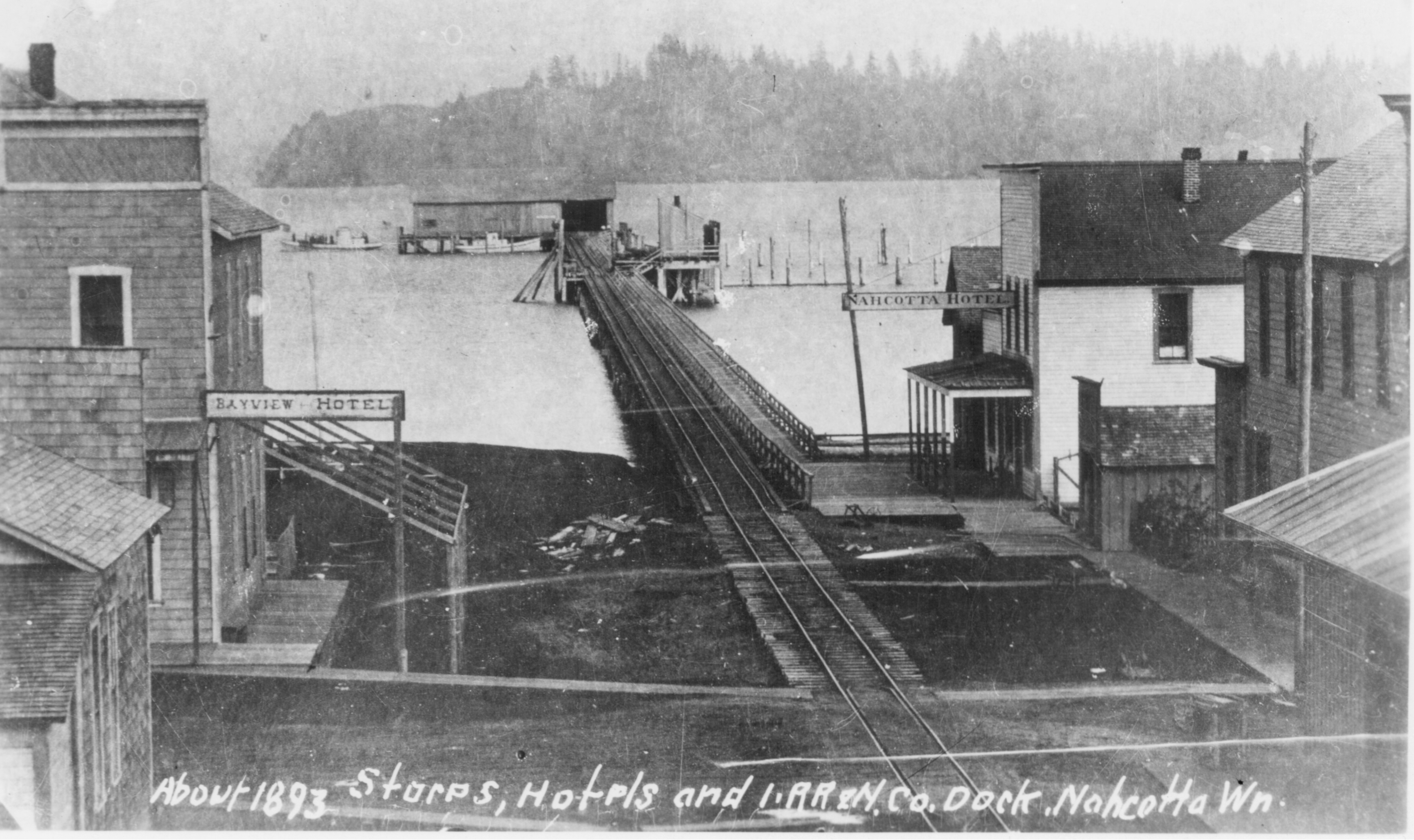
Nahcotta Washington, ca. 1893, railroad pier and steamboats at dock

In 1858, Capt. James H. Whitcomb, a pioneer of the Oregon Territory, obtained a contract to carry mail from Willapa, Washington, a small settlement upstream from modern-day Raymond, where he had a donation land claim, across the Willapa Bay to Oysterville. He ran passengers, freight and mail on the route with the sloops Minerva and Pet, and later the steamboat Favorite. Later, he commanded the steamers Montesano and Tom Morris on Willapa Bay. His son, James P. Whitcomb, built Mountain Buck at Naselle in 1888, which was placed in towing service under his father's command.

Another main route was from South Bend, Washington to Nahcotta, Washington, on the Long Beach Peninsula. At Nahcotta, the propeller steamers Shamrock and Reliable would meet the train at the end of the Nahcotta dock, and pick up passengers bound for South Bend across Willapa Bay. In 1896, another steamer employed on the Willapa Bay run was the Edgar.

== Vessels ==
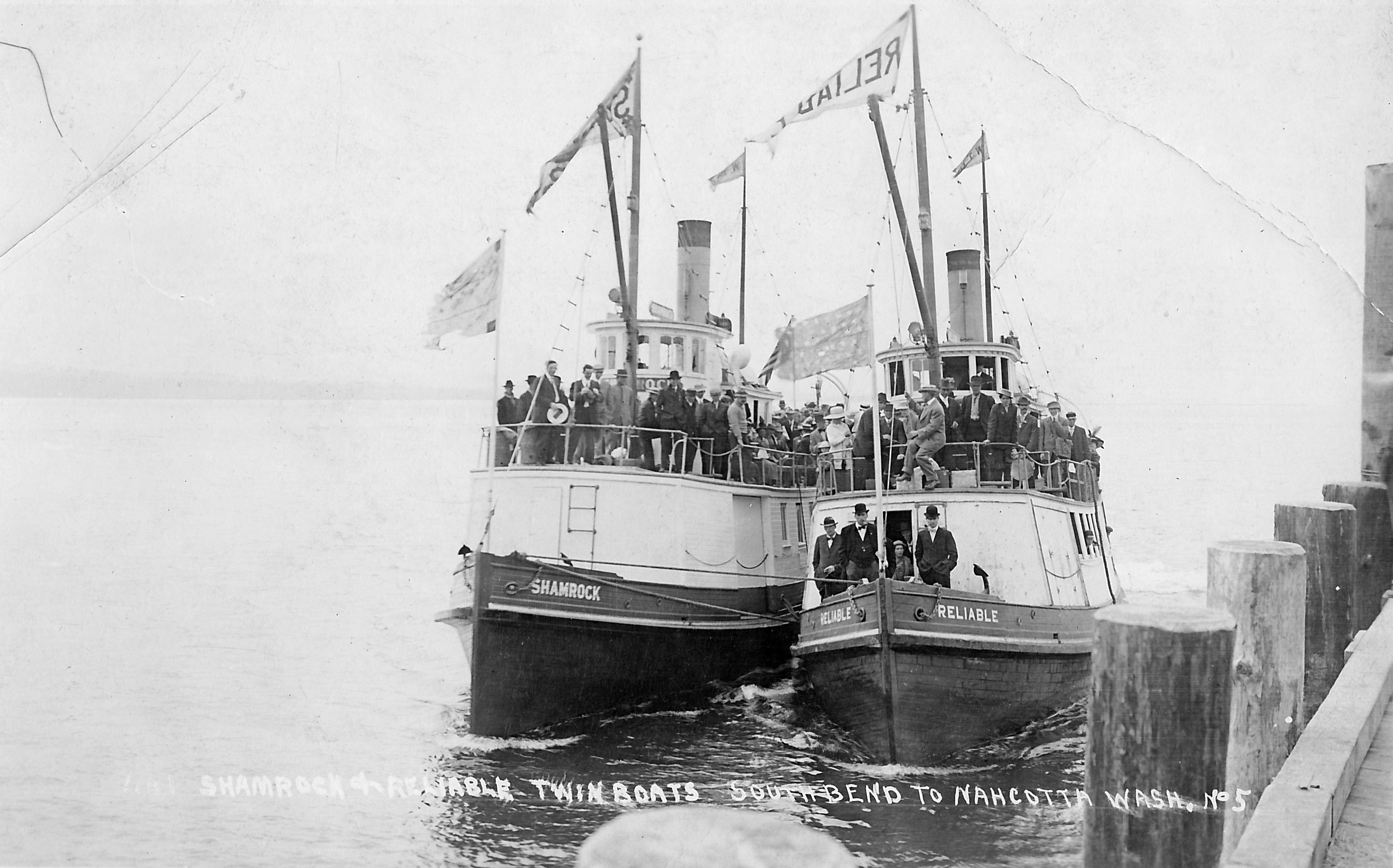
The steamboats Shamrock and Reliable 1902–1925

In 1875, the steamer General Canby was launched at South Bend. George A. Whitcomb, member of a prominent steamboating family, served on her as mate. In 1882, the Shoalwater Bay Transportation Company launched Montesano at Astoria to run mail from Willapa to Sealand, Washington, on the Long Beach Peninsula.

In 1902, the steam propeller Reliable (99 tons, 73') was built at Astoria, Oregon for the Willapa Bay Transportation Company, operating under the command of Captain A.W. Reed. Much later, in 1925, when passenger traffic had fallen, Reliable's upper works were cut down and she was converted into a tug.

In 1903, Lauderback & Taylor of Willapa built the steam propeller Laurel for C.A. and James S. Coulter of South Bend. She had a steeple compound engine and Morgan-type pipe boiler. She worked as a tow and log boat in Willapa Bay until she was sold to the Hubble concern in Grays Harbor, where she was abandoned in 1938.

In 1905, the steam propeller Shamrock (99 tons, 72'), a near twin to Reliable, was also built at Astoria, by R.M. Leathers. She had a 225 horsepower (168 kW) compound steam engine, and was operated by A.W. Reed, doing business as the Willapa Bay Transportation Co. As with Reliable, Shamrock was later converted to a towboat under Knappton Towing Co. of Astoria. Agnes, a steam tug built at Hoquiam in 1905, was later placed in service in Willapa Bay under T.H. Bell.

Another vessel in service on Willapa Bay was Flora Brown, used to tow logs to mills at South Bend.

== See also ==
- Ilwaco Railway and Navigation Company
- Pacific County, Washington
- Astoria, Oregon
- Nahcotta, Washington
- Columbia River Maritime Museum
- Willapa Bay
- Raymond, Washington
- South Bend, Washington
- Tokeland, Washington
- Pacific County, Washington
