= Willapa River =

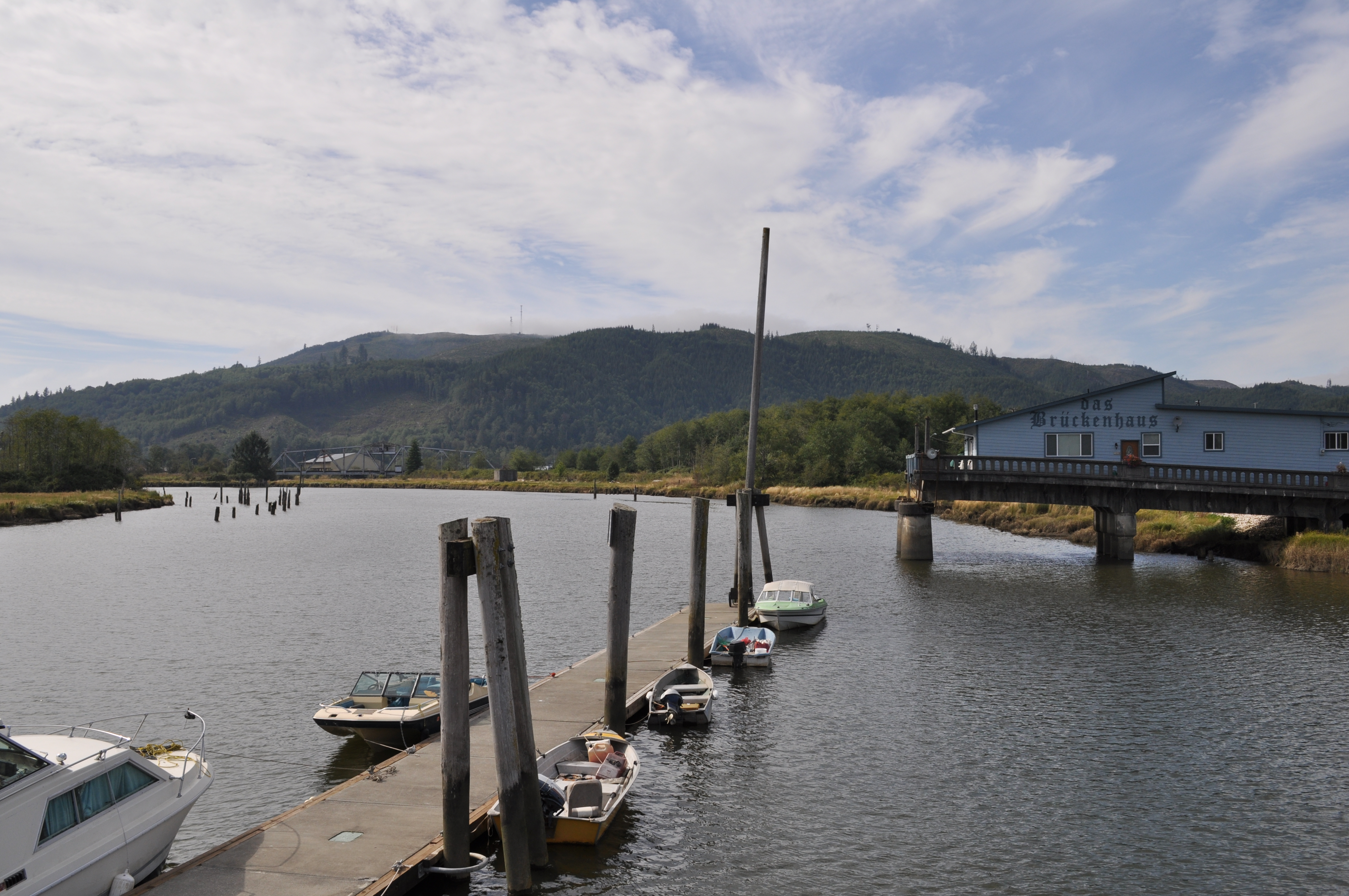

- Location of the mouth of the Willapa River in Washington

Location
- Country: United States
- State: Washington
- County: Pacific

Physical characteristics
- Source: Willapa Hills
  - location: Washington
  - coordinates: 46°29′50″N 123°24′47″W
- Mouth: Willapa Bay
  - location: Washington
  - coordinates: 46°42′27″N 123°51′2″W
  - elevation: 0 ft (0 m)
- Length: 20 mi (32 km)
- Discharge
  - location: river mile 17.8, near Willapa, WA
  - average: 636 cu ft/s (18.0 m^{3}/s)
  - minimum: 14 cu ft/s (0.40 m^{3}/s)
  - maximum: 12,800 cu ft/s (360 m^{3}/s)

The Willapa River is a river on the Pacific coast of southwestern Washington in the United States, approximately 20 miles (32 km) long. It drains an area of low hills and a coastal plain into Willapa Bay, a large estuary north of the mouth of the Columbia River.

The river rises in the Willapa Hills in southeastern Pacific County, approximately 25 miles (40 km) west of Chehalis. It flows northwest in a winding course past the small communities of Willapa and Raymond. It enters the northwest end of Willapa Bay at South Bend.

== Name ==
The name is that of the Willapa people, an Athapaskan-speaking people, now extinct, who occupied the valley of the river and also the prairies between the headwaters of the Chehalis and Cowlitz Rivers.

== See also ==
- List of rivers of Washington (state)
