= South Bend, Washington =

South Bend
- City
- South Bend, Washington
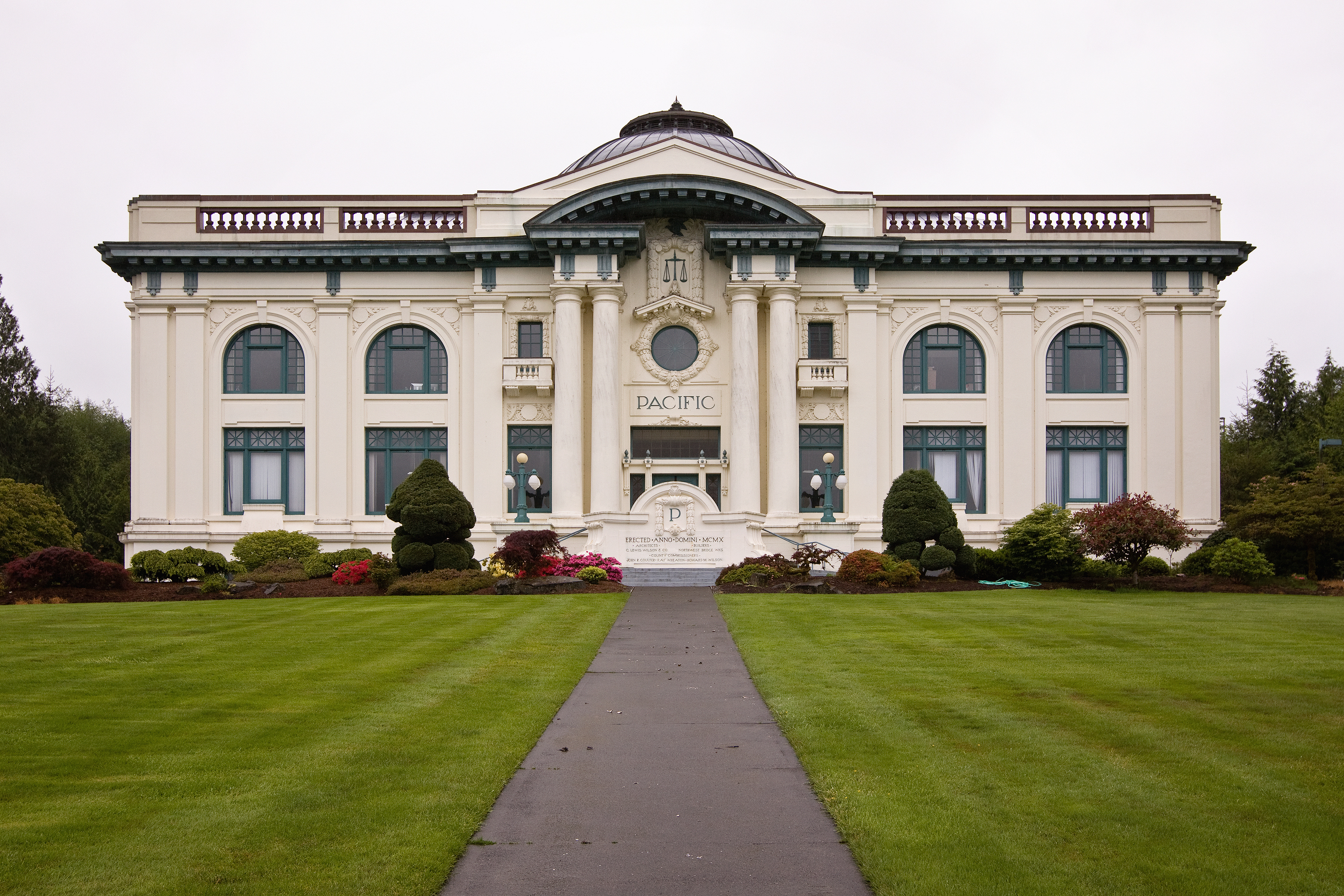
- Pacific County Courthouse, South Bend
- Nickname: Oyster Capital of the World
- Location of South Bend, Washington
- Coordinates: 46°40′04″N 123°48′02″W
- Country: United States
- State: Washington
- County: Pacific

Government
  - Type: Mayor–council
  - Mayor: Bethany Barnard

Area
  - Total: 1.99 sq mi (5.16 km^{2})
  - Land: 1.64 sq mi (4.25 km^{2})
  - Water: 0.35 sq mi (0.91 km^{2})
- Elevation: 10 ft (3.0 m)

Population (2020)
  - Total: 1,746
  - Density: 1,060/sq mi (411/km^{2})
- Time zone: UTC-8 (Pacific (PST))
  - Summer (DST): UTC-7 (PDT)
- ZIP Code: 98586
- Area code(s): 360, 564
- FIPS code: 53-65625
- GNIS feature ID: 2411933
- Website: City of South Bend

South Bend is a city in and the county seat of Pacific County, Washington, United States. The population was 1,746 as of the 2020 census. The town is widely-known for its oyster production and scenery.

== History ==
South Bend was officially incorporated on September 27, 1890. The name of the city comes from its location on the Willapa River. The county seat was relocated from Oysterville to South Bend in 1893. The Pacific County Courthouse is on the National Register of Historic Places. The old South Bend Courthouse was the site of the first and only execution carried out in Pacific County, when convicted murderer Lum You was hanged in 1902.

== Geography ==
South Bend is located on the Willapa river.

According to the United States Census Bureau, the city has a total area of 2.01 square miles (5.21 km^{2}), of which, 1.63 square miles (4.22 km^{2}) is land and 0.38 square miles (0.98 km^{2}) is water.

=== Climate ===
South Bend has a borderline Mediterranean climate (Köppen Csb)/oceanic climate (Köppen Cfb) characterised by pleasant summers and cool, very wet winters.

Climate data for South Bend, WA
Month	Jan	Feb	Mar	Apr	May	Jun	Jul	Aug	Sep	Oct	Nov	Dec	Year
Mean daily maximum °F (°C)	46 (8)	50 (10)	54 (12)	57 (14)	62 (17)	66 (19)	70 (21)	72 (22)	69 (21)	60 (16)	51 (11)	46 (8)	59 (15)
Mean daily minimum °F (°C)	32 (0)	33 (1)	35 (2)	37 (3)	42 (6)	47 (8)	50 (10)	50 (10)	45 (7)	39 (4)	36 (2)	33 (1)	40 (5)
Average precipitation inches (mm)	12.05 (306)	10.75 (273)	9.25 (235)	6.31 (160)	4.03 (102)	2.84 (72)	1.45 (37)	1.47 (37)	3.24 (82)	6.82 (173)	12.67 (322)	12.76 (324)	83.64 (2,123)
Source: The Weather Channel

== Demographics ==
Historical population
Census	Pop.	Note	%±
1900	711		—
1910	3,023		325.2%
1920	1,948		−35.6%
1930	1,798		−7.7%
1940	1,771		−1.5%
1950	1,857		4.9%
1960	1,671		−10.0%
1970	1,795		7.4%
1980	1,686		−6.1%
1990	1,551		−8.0%
2000	1,807		16.5%
2010	1,637		−9.4%
2020	1,746		6.7%
U.S. Decennial Census; 2020 Census

=== 2020 census ===
As of the 2020 census, South Bend had a population of 1,746. The median age was 42.2 years. 23.5% of residents were under the age of 18 and 23.1% of residents were 65 years of age or older. For every 100 females there were 98.2 males, and for every 100 females age 18 and over there were 99.3 males age 18 and over.

0.0% of residents lived in urban areas, while 100.0% lived in rural areas.

There were 681 households in South Bend, of which 32.3% had children under the age of 18 living in them. Of all households, 40.2% were married-couple households, 22.3% were households with a male householder and no spouse or partner present, and 27.8% were households with a female householder and no spouse or partner present. About 31.3% of all households were made up of individuals and 17.0% had someone living alone who was 65 years of age or older.

There were 744 housing units, of which 8.5% were vacant. The homeowner vacancy rate was 0.0% and the rental vacancy rate was 3.8%.

Racial composition as of the 2020 census
Race	Number	Percent
White	1,143	65.5%
Black or African American	8	0.5%
American Indian and Alaska Native	55	3.2%
Asian	99	5.7%
Native Hawaiian and Other Pacific Islander	5	0.3%
Some other race	270	15.5%
Two or more races	166	9.5%
Hispanic or Latino (of any race)	437	25.0%

=== 2010 census ===
As of the 2010 census, there were 1,637 people, 684 households, and 414 families living in the city. The population density was 1,004.3 inhabitants per square mile (387.8/km^{2}). There were 780 housing units at an average density of 478.5 per square mile (184.7/km^{2}). The racial makeup of the city was 72.2% White, 0.2% African American, 3.4% Native American, 5.5% Asian, 13.3% from other races, and 5.4% from two or more races. Hispanic or Latino of any race were 19.4% of the population.

There were 684 households, of which 27.5% had children under the age of 18 living with them, 43.3% were married couples living together, 11.1% had a female householder with no husband present, 6.1% had a male householder with no wife present, and 39.5% were non-families. 33.8% of all households were made up of individuals, and 16.5% had someone living alone who was 65 years of age or older. The average household size was 2.31 and the average family size was 2.93.

The median age in the city was 43.9 years. 22.8% of residents were under the age of 18; 8.1% were between the ages of 18 and 24; 20.7% were from 25 to 44; 26.8% were from 45 to 64; and 21.7% were 65 years of age or older. The gender makeup of the city was 50.3% male and 49.7% female.

=== 2000 census ===
As of the 2000 census, there were 1,807 people, 702 households, and 471 families living in the city.

The population density was 999.4 people per square mile (385.5/km^{2}). There were 815 housing units at an average density of 450.7 per square mile (173.9/km^{2}).

The racial makeup of the city was 83.45% White, 9.24% Hispanic or Latino, 4.93% Asian, 3.71% Native American, 0.17% African American, and 0.17% Pacific Islander. 3.76% identified themselves as some other race and 3.82% as two or more races. 17.7% were of German, 11.6% American, 9.1% Irish and 7.7% English ancestry according to Census 2000.

Of the 702 households, 52.3% consisted of married couples living together, 32.9% were non-family households, 29.5% contained children under the age of 18, 26.9% were made up of individuals only, 13.0% had someone living alone who was 65 years of age or older, and 10.0% had a female householder with no husband present. The average household size was 2.48 and the average family size was 3.02.

In the city, the population was spread out, with 26.4% under the age of 18, 7.7% from 18 to 24, 23.6% from 25 to 44, 24.1% from 45 to 64, and 18.2% who were 65 years of age or older. The median age was 39 years. For every 100 females, there were 94.9 males. For every 100 females age 18 and over, there were 94.7 males.

The median income for a household in the city was $29,211, and the median income for a family was $35,221. Males had a median income of $35,069 versus $23,906 for females. The per capita income for the city was $14,776. About 12.8% of families and 18.3% of the population were below the poverty line, including 25.5% of those under age 18 and 6.5% of those age 65 or over.

== Notable natives ==
- Helen Kleeb – Actress who played Miss Mamie Baldwin in The Waltons
- Pat Paulsen – Comedian and satirist

== See also ==
- Frederick Copenspire
- Steamboats of Willapa Bay
- Willapa Bay
