= Willapa Bay =

Estuary in Washington state, US

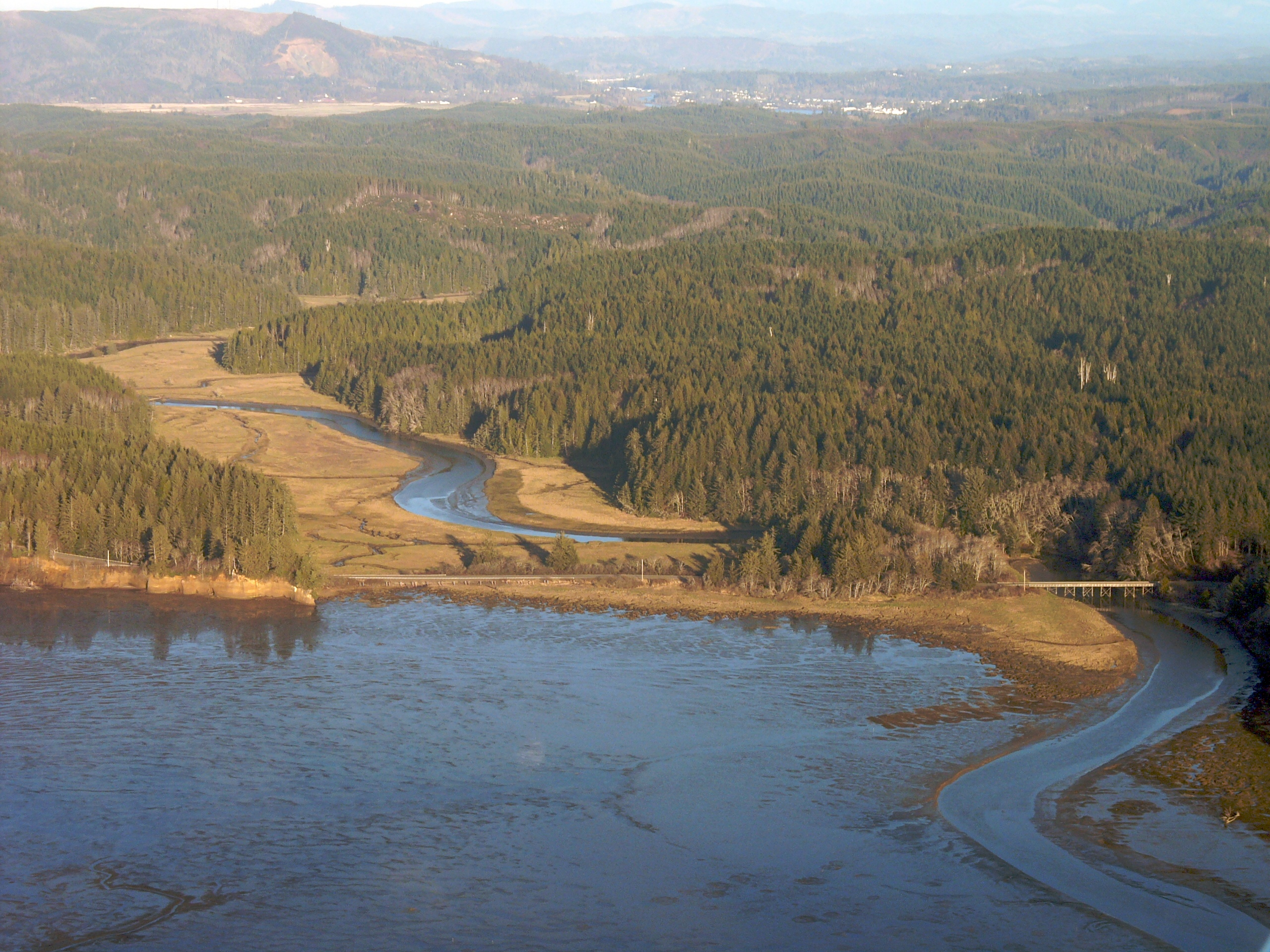
- Bone River flows into Willapa Bay's east side

- Location within Washington (state)
- Location: Pacific Ocean
- Coordinates: 46°39′44″N 124°0′38″W
- River sources: Bone River, Niawiakum River, Palix River, Naselle River, Bear River
- Ocean/sea sources: Pacific Ocean
- Basin countries: United States
- References: 1531192

Willapa Bay (/ˈwɪləpɑː/) is a bay located on the southwest Pacific coast of Washington state in the United States. The Long Beach Peninsula separates Willapa Bay from the greater expanse of the Pacific Ocean. With over 120 square miles (310 km^{2}) of surface area Willapa Bay is the second-largest riverine estuary on the Pacific coast of the continental United States. Early settlers called the bay Shoalwater Bay and this name is found on old maps and charts of the region.

Willapa Bay is fairly shallow: more than half of its surface area lies in the intertidal zone, and half of the volume of water inside it enters and leaves with every tide. The bay is an estuary formed when the Long Beach Peninsula, a long sand spit from the Columbia River to the south, partially enclosed the estuaries of several smaller rivers. It is a ria, which formed after the rise in sea level at the end of the last ice age flooded several small river valleys. The North River, Willapa River, and Naselle River provide most of the freshwater input into the bay. Other rivers that empty into Willapa Bay include the Bone River, Niawiakum River, Palix River, Cedar River and Bear River, among others.

The bay is bordered by several smaller towns and unincorporated communities such as Raymond and South Bend, both on the Willapa River; Oysterville, Nahcotta, Bay Center and Tokeland are on the bay itself. The bay is entirely located within Pacific County, Washington and is home to a local oyster and seafood processing industry: approximately 9% of all oysters in the U.S. are grown there.

Willapa Bay is known for its biodiversity and much of it, including the entirety of Long Island, has been set aside as part of the Willapa National Wildlife Refuge. The oyster beds help the ecosystem by providing habitats and filtering water, improving the quality of the water. The bay's ecology was threatened in the 1990s by the rapid spreading of Atlantic cordgrass (Spartina alterniflora), a non-native species of grass introduced possibly to help preserve wetlands and marsh areas, and possibly simply by accident as packing material in crates of oysters from the East Coast. The State of Washington has been spraying an herbicide thought not to threaten other species since about 2005, and the Spartina threat is much reduced.

== See also ==
- Pacific County, Washington
- Oysterville, Washington
- Shoalwater Bay Tribe
- Steamboats of Willapa Bay
- Ilwaco Railway and Navigation Company
