= Bay Center, Washington =

- CDP
- Location of Bay Center, Washington
- Coordinates: 46°37′28″N 123°57′15″W
- Country: United States
- State: Washington
- County: Pacific

Area
  - Total: 0.39 sq mi (1.0 km^{2})
  - Land: 0.39 sq mi (1.0 km^{2})
  - Water: 0 sq mi (0.0 km^{2})
- Elevation: 46 ft (14 m)

Population (2020)
  - Total: 253
  - Density: 660/sq mi (250/km^{2})
- Time zone: UTC-8 (Pacific (PST))
  - Summer (DST): UTC-7 (PDT)
- ZIP Code: 98527
- Area code(s): 360, 564
- FIPS code: 53-04615
- GNIS feature ID: 2407807

Bay Center is a census-designated place (CDP) in Pacific County, Washington, United States. The population was 174 at the 2000 census. The population increased to 276 at the 2010 census. However, in the 2020 census, the population decreased to 253.

A post office called Bay Center has been in operation since 1876. The community was named for its central location on the harbor.

== Geography ==
Bay Center is located near the mouth of the Palix River and Niawiakum River.

According to the United States Census Bureau, the CDP has a total area of 0.4 square miles (1.0 km^{2}), all of it land.

== Demographics ==
Historical population
Census	Pop.	Note	%±
2000	174		—
2010	276		58.6%
2020	253		−8.3%
U.S. Decennial Census; 1990 2000 2010 2020

Bay Center first appeared as a census designated place in the 2000 U.S. census.

=== Racial and ethnic composition ===
Bay Center CDP, Washington – Racial and ethnic composition Note: the US Census treats Hispanic/Latino as an ethnic category. This table excludes Latinos from the racial categories and assigns them to a separate category. Hispanics/Latinos may be of any race.
Race / Ethnicity (NH = Non-Hispanic)	Pop 2000	Pop 2010	Pop 2020	% 2000	% 2010	% 2020
White alone (NH)	117	187	147	67.24%	67.75%	58.10%
Black or African American alone (NH)	0	0	1	0.00%	0.00%	0.40%
Native American or Alaska Native alone (NH)	25	31	21	14.37%	11.23%	8.30%
Asian alone (NH)	1	1	5	0.57%	0.36%	1.98%
Native Hawaiian or Pacific Islander alone (NH)	0	0	0	0.00%	0.00%	0.00%
Other race alone (NH)	0	0	1	0.00%	0.00%	0.40%
Mixed race or Multiracial (NH)	13	33	35	7.47%	11.96%	13.83%
Hispanic or Latino (any race)	18	24	43	10.34%	8.70%	17.00%
Total	174	276	253	100.00%	100.00%	100.00%

=== 2000 census ===
As of the census of 2000, there were 174 people, 70 households, and 42 families residing in the CDP. The population density was 443.7 people per square mile (172.3/km^{2}). There were 92 housing units at an average density of 234.6/sq mi (91.1/km^{2}). The racial makeup of the CDP was 68.39% White, 14.37% Native American, 0.57% Asian, 9.20% from other races, and 7.47% from two or more races. Hispanic or Latino of any race were 10.34% of the population. 10.7% were of English, 9.2% Irish and 6.9% American ancestry according to Census 2000.

There were 70 households, out of which 34.3% had children under the age of 18 living with them, 45.7% were married couples living together, 10.0% had a female householder with no husband present, and 38.6% were non-families. 34.3% of all households were made up of individuals, and 10.0% had someone living alone who was 65 years of age or older. The average household size was 2.49 and the average family size was 3.19.

In the CDP, the population was spread out, with 31.0% under the age of 18, 13.2% from 18 to 24, 22.4% from 25 to 44, 19.5% from 45 to 64, and 13.8% who were 65 years of age or older. The median age was 30 years. For every 100 females, there were 107.1 males. For every 100 females age 18 and over, there were 106.9 males.

The median income for a household in the CDP was $38,409, and the median income for a family was $42,656. Males had a median income of $33,125 versus $19,688 for females. The per capita income for the CDP was $19,325. About 10.9% of families and 13.4% of the population were below the poverty line, including 14.3% of those under the age of eighteen and 17.9% of those 65 or over.

== Notable residents ==
- Lum You, convicted murderer
- Colin Cowherd, television host
