= Washington State Route 105 =

State highway in Washington, United States

State Route 105
- A map of the Grays Harbor area with SR 105 highlighted in red

Route information
- Auxiliary route of US 101
- Maintained by WSDOT
- Length: 48.57 mi (78.17 km)
- Existed: 1964–present
- Tourist routes: Cranberry Coast Scenic Byway

Major junctions
- South end: US 101 in Raymond
- SR 105 Spur near Westport
- East end: US 101 in Aberdeen

Location
- Country: United States
- State: Washington
- Counties: Pacific, Grays Harbor

Highway system
- State highways in Washington; Interstate; US; State; Scenic; Pre-1964; 1964 renumbering; Former
← SR 104	→ SR 106

State Route 105 (SR 105) is a state highway in the U.S. state of Washington. It travels 48 miles (77 km) along the Pacific Coast between two junctions with U.S. Route 101 (US 101) in Raymond to the south and Aberdeen in the north. The highway also has two spur routes: a 4-mile (6 km) road serving the city of Westport on Grays Harbor and a short connector in Aberdeen.

== Route description ==
SR 105 begins at an intersection with US 101 on the north bank of the Willapa River in Raymond, about one mile (1.6 km) north of the western terminus of SR 6. The highway follows Park Avenue through Raymond's northern residential neighborhoods and turns southwest to follow the Willapa River downstream and opposite from US 101. It turns northwest to follow the river as it approaches its mouth at the east end of Willapa Bay and passes Willapa Harbor Airport. SR 105 continues west along the Willapa Bay estuary, crossing over North River near the Smith Creek State Wildlife Recreation Area and following the foothills of the Willapa Hills. The highway continues west through the Shoalwater Bay Indian Reservation, located northwest of Tokeland and Dexter by the Sea, and turns north at North Cove on the Pacific Coast.

The highway continues along the coast and passes through Grayland Beach State Park and the beachside community of Grayland in Grays Harbor County. It turns east at Cohassett Beach near Twin Harbors State Park while a spur route continues north to the city of Westport at the mouth of Grays Harbor. SR 105 travels east along the South Bay of Grays Harbor, crossing over the Elk River and the Johns River at Markham. The highway then passes through Ocosta and near the Stafford Creek Corrections Center before entering the city limits of Aberdeen. SR 105 turns north onto Boone Street near the Grays Harbor College campus and the Shoppes at Riverside shopping mall. The road expands to five lanes as it passes through the commercial and residential areas of southern Aberdeen and turns northwest after Marion Street, continuing for one block until reaching the terminus of SR 105 at a junction with US 101 on the southern bank of the Chehalis River.

SR 105 is maintained by the Washington State Department of Transportation (WSDOT), which conducts an annual survey on state highways to measure traffic volume in terms of annual average daily traffic. The highway's daily vehicle counts in 2016 ranges from a minimum of 970 vehicles near Tokeland to a maximum of 17,000 in southern Aberdeen. SR 105 is designated by the state government as the Cranberry Coast Scenic Byway, recognizing the area's cranberry industry. The highway is also a signed tsunami evacuation route for Westport and Grayland.

== Spur routes ==
State Route 105 Spur
- Location: Westport, Washington
- Length: 4.02 mi (6.47 km)

State Route 105 Spur (more specifically referred to by the Washington State Department of Transportation (WSDOT) as "State Route 105 Spur Westport") is a spur of State Route 105 that goes north into the town of Westport, USA. It snakes through the city streets, initially as Forrest Street, finally ending at the harbor.

The SR 105/105 Spur junction is about 5 miles (8 km) north of Grayland, Washington, immediately adjacent to Twin Harbors State Park. The spur is 4.02 miles (6.47 km) long. WSDOT estimates that daily traffic on the spur route ranges from 1,000 vehicles at its northern terminus to 5,400 at Montesano Street.

State Route 105 Spur can also refer to a 0.15-mile (240 m) section of the Aberdeen-area SR 105/U.S. Route 101 junction specifically referred to by WSDOT as "State Route 105 Spur Boone". WSDOT estimates that traffic counts on the Boone spur range from 1,200 to 1,700 vehicles.

== History ==
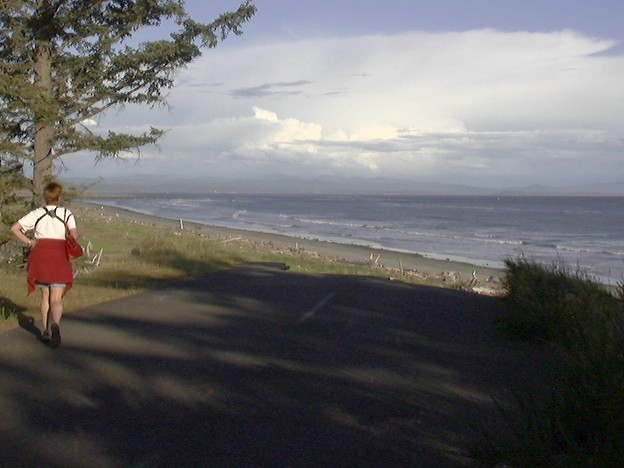
A section of SR 105 near Cape Shoalwater that was abandoned and bypassed in the 1990s due to coastline erosion

SR 105 follows the Aberdeen–Tokeland Highway, which was constructed in the 1920s to connect Tokeland and Westport to Aberdeen. It was added to the state highway system in 1937 as Secondary State Highway 13A (SSH 13A), the lone branch of Primary State Highway 13, with a spur route serving Westport and plans to extend the main road from Tokeland to Raymond.

Construction of the Tokeland–Raymond highway was delayed until the early 1950s despite lobbying from local interests. The rugged terrain, difficult soil conditions, and weather issues delayed completion until the 1960s. The final section of SSH 13A, between Tokeland and Raymond, was opened in 1962. In the 1964 state highway renumbering, SSH 13A was assigned the designation of SR 105. Part of the new coastal highway was eroded away in the late 1960s, leading to the first of several re-location projects. The state government submitted an application to the American Association of State Highway Officials in 1962 to designate the coastal route as U.S. Route 101 Alternate, but were denied due to the route's lack of justification.

Between Grayland and Tokeland, SR 105 had to be re-routed inland in the 1990s from Cape Shoalwater, due to currents coming out of Willapa Bay causing severe erosion, taking many acres of land out to sea.

== Major intersections ==
County	Location	mi	km	Destinations	Notes
Pacific	Raymond	0.00	0.00	US 101 – Aberdeen, Astoria	
Grays Harbor		30.16	48.54	SR 105 Spur north – Westport	
Grays Harbor	Aberdeen	48.44	77.96	SR 105 Spur to US 101 south – Raymond	
Grays Harbor	Aberdeen	48.57	78.17	US 101 north – Hoquiam, Olympia	
1.000 mi = 1.609 km; 1.000 km = 0.621 mi
