= Grayland =

Grayland may refer to:

- Grayland station, Chicago, Illinois
- Grayland, Washington
- Grayland Beach State Park, Washington
- Albert Grayland, English cricketer
- Grayland Arnold, American football player

== See also ==
- Greyland, Canadian documentary film
- Graylands, England
- Greylands, 1997 novel
