= Ocosta High School =

Coordinates: 46.8644°N 124.1009°W

Ocosta Junior-Senior High School

Location
- 2580 Montesanto Street South; Westport, (Grays Harbor County), Washington 98595; United States

Information
- Type: Public high school
- School district: Ocosta School District
- Principal: Mike Cummings
- Staff: 17.31 (FTE)
- Enrollment: 257 (2023-2024)
- Student to teacher ratio: 14.85
- Colors: Crimson and black
- Nickname: Wildcats
- Website: www.ocosta.org/page/jr-sr-high-school

Ocosta Junior Senior High School, commonly known as Ocosta or Ocosta High School, is a public junior and senior high school located in Westport, Washington, and is part of the Ocosta School District. The high school mascot is the Wildcat. The school teaches grades 7–12.

As of the 2022–23 school year, the school had an enrollment of 243 students and 16.3 classroom teachers (on an FTE basis), for a student–teacher ratio of 14.9:1. There were 134 students (55.1% of enrollment) eligible for free lunch and 16 (6.6% of students) eligible for reduced-cost lunch.
