= Johns River (Washington) =

- Location of the mouth of Johns River in Washington

Location
- Country: United States
- State: Washington
- County: Grays Harbor

Physical characteristics
- Source: Willapa Hills
  - location: North River Divide
  - coordinates: 46°53′5″N 123°50′9″W
  - elevation: 535 ft (163 m)
- Mouth: Grays Harbor
  - location: Markham, Washington
  - coordinates: 46°54′26″N 124°0′41″W
  - elevation: 0 ft (0 m)
- Length: 15 mi (24 km)

Johns River is a short tidal river flowing into the south end of Grays Harbor in the U.S. state of Washington.

Johns River originates in the Willapa Hills in southwestern Grays Harbor County, near the North River Divide, which separates its basin from that of the North River. There are two main sources of Johns River, the South Fork and the longer North Fork Johns River. Including the North Fork the river is about 15 mi (24 km) long. Both forks flow generally west and northwest. Florence Creek is a tributary of the North Fork, while the South Fork's tributaries include Archer Creek, Big Creek, and Hall Creek. After the two forks join the river is joined by Balloon Creek, Crawford Ditch, Atwood Creek, Bluff Creek, Gold Creek, and Beaver Creek. Johns River enters Grays Harbor at Markham, about 5 mi (8.0 km) west of Aberdeen.

The river's lowermost course runs through the Johns River Wildlife Area Unit, part of the Johns River Wildlife Area.

== See also ==
- List of rivers of Washington (state)
