= Tsunami-proof building =

Building designed to withstand extreme floods

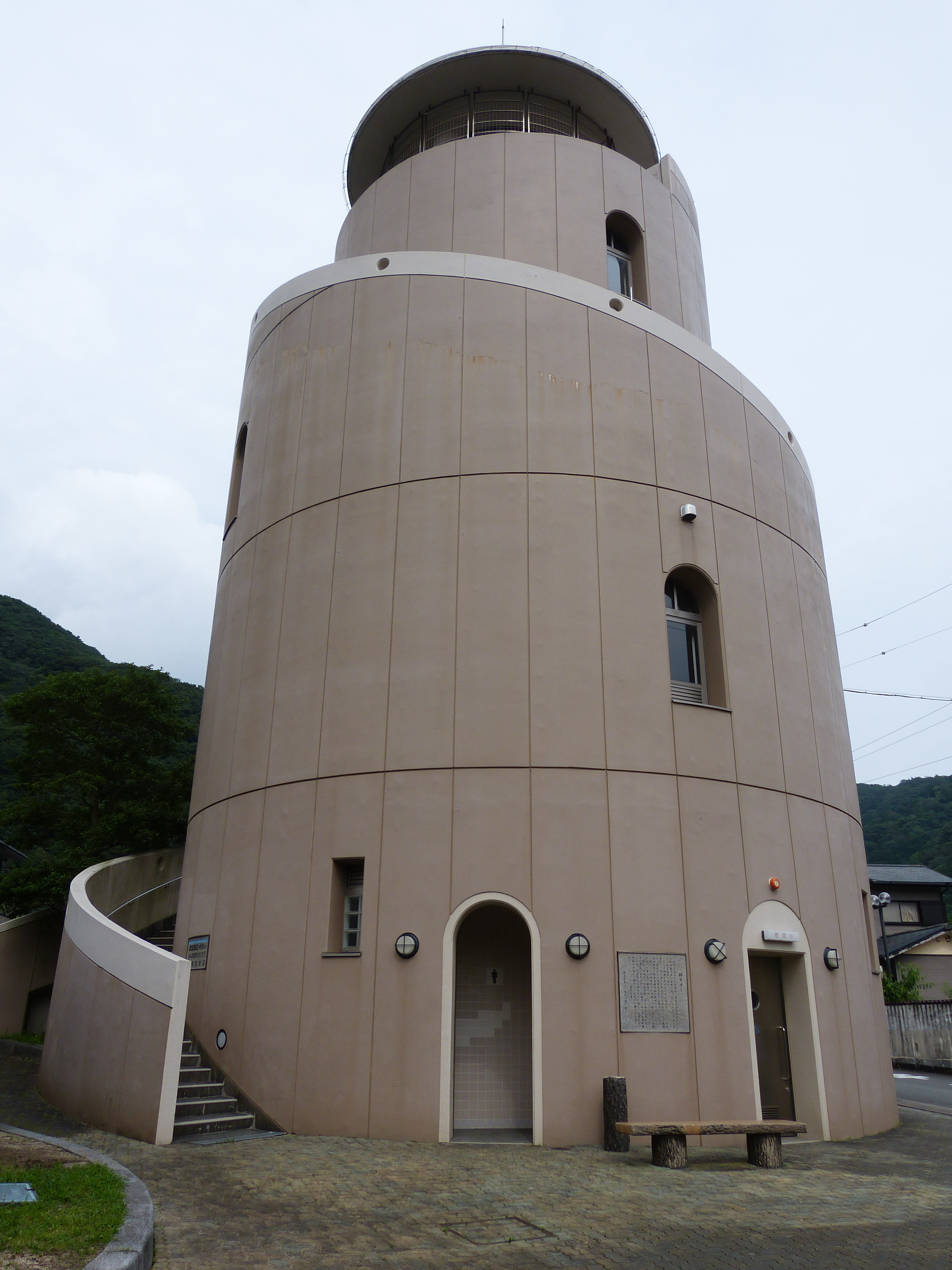
Nishiki Tower in Taiki, Mie, Japan, is designed to resist powerful waves and has a tsunami shelter on the fourth floor

A tsunami-proof building is a purposefully designed building which will, through its design integrity, withstand and survive the forces of a tsunami wave or extreme storm surge. It is hydrodynamically shaped to offer protection from high waves. This thus causes the building to be dubbed 'tsunami-proof'.

== Examples ==
An example of such an architecture is where a laminar flow around a building will protect the walls. The structure can also rest on a hollow masonry block that for example can hold a body of water to sustain a family. Another example of such tsunami-proof techniques is when breakaway windows or walls are used. A known example of this has been built on the northern end of Camano Island. A design can include battered walls, cantilever steps and a wooden superstructure with the walls jutting out. Bamboo ply panels can be added to cover the sides. A structure like this, concomitant with its mechanical strength, will provide its occupants with independent potable water storage for an extended period of time. The first example known has been constructed at Poovar Island in southern Kerala, India.

=== United States ===
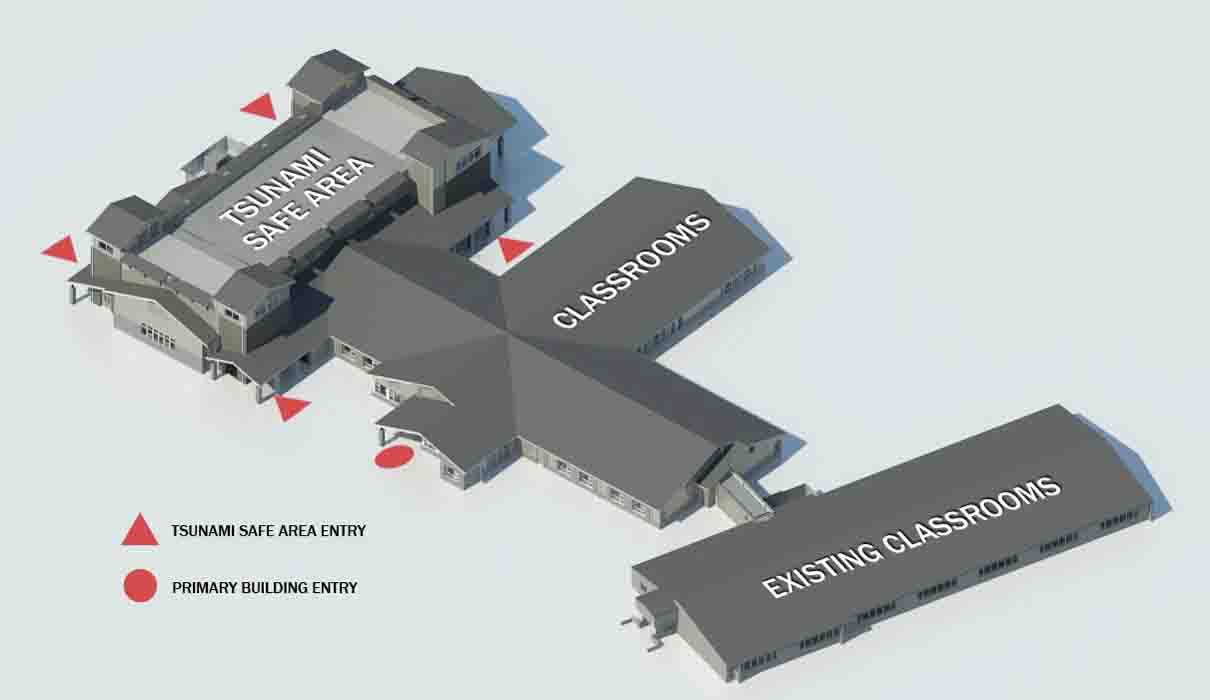
Tsunami-proof design of Ocosta Elementary School, Washington

In the United States, there is a recognized lack of tsunami-proof design, especially in vital installations such as aging nuclear reactors in vulnerable regions. For instance, the Unified Building Code of California does not have any provision about designing for tsunamis. There are only a few states, such as Hawaii, that began incorporating tsunami-proof design within their building codes. Some experts, however, doubt the efficacy of the tsunami-proof buildings, arguing that the force of the tsunami is unknown and that the impact is often so great that specialized building elements would be rendered ineffectual.

=== Tsunami-proof buildings in Japan ===
There are important facilities in Japan, which is often inundated with tsunamis, that feature tsunami-proof design. The Hamaoka Nuclear Power Plant has a barrier wall designed to protect the facility from tsunami wave caused by an earthquake predicted along the Nankai Sea trough. The barrier itself is made of continuous steel pipes and steel box frames. In other Japanese nuclear facilities, tsunami proofing includes building elements such as doors and balconies in the reactor and auxiliary buildings.

The March 2011 Fukushima Daiichi nuclear disaster was caused by a tsunami wave 13 meters (43 ft) high that overtopped the plant's 10 m (33 ft) high seawall. Despite its defenses, the Hamaoka plant has been shut down since May 2011 to avoid a similar disaster.

== See also ==
- Earthquake-resistant structures
- Escape pod
