= Billy Gohl =

Suspected serial killer (1873–1927)

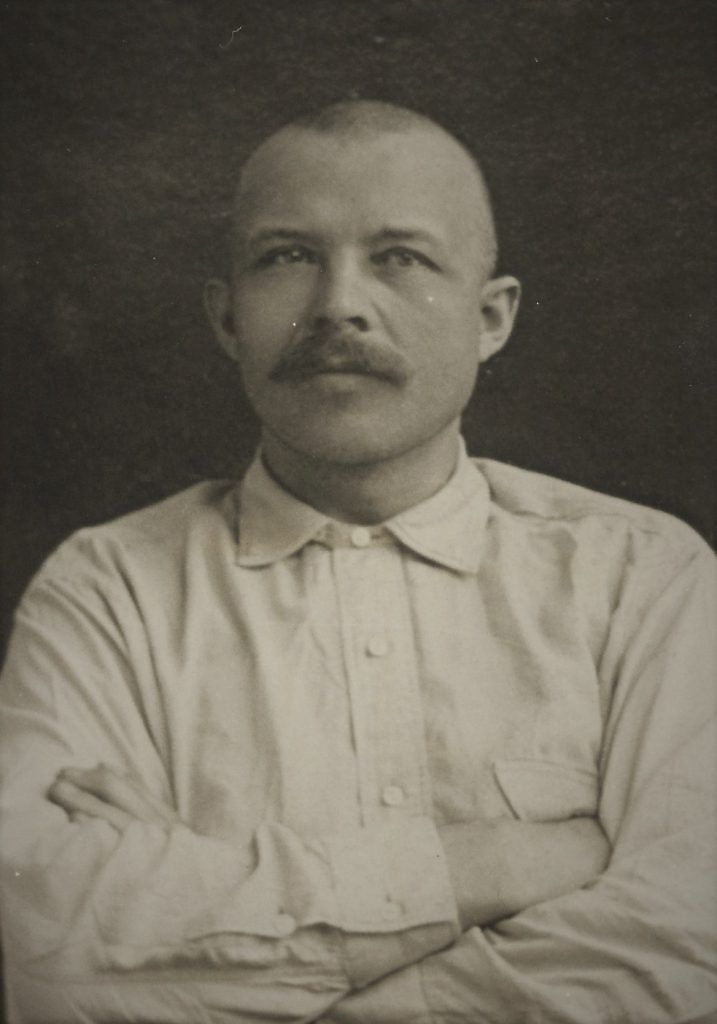
- Born: William F. Gohl; February 6, 1873; Germany
- Died: March 3, 1927 (aged 54); Eastern State Hospital Spokane County, Washington, United States
- Other names: Ghoul of Grays Harbor "Billy Montana"
- Penalty: Life imprisonment

Details
- Victims: 2–6 (but possibly 100+)
- Span of crimes: 1902–1910
- Country: United States
- State: Washington
- Date apprehended: 1910

William Gohl (February 6, 1873 – March 3, 1927) was a German-American murderer and suspected serial killer who, while working as a labor union official, murdered several sailors passing through Aberdeen, Washington.

Gohl was convicted of two murders in 1910 and is a suspect in dozens more that occurred between about 1905 and 1910, all supposedly for financial gain by stealing valuables from the victims. Spared from the death penalty by a request for leniency by the jury, he was sentenced to life in prison at Walla Walla State Penitentiary where he died in 1927 from lobar pneumonia and erysipelas complicated by dementia paralytic caused by syphilis.

Historian Aaron Goings argues there is cause for doubt that Gohl was a killer, proposing instead that the numerous bodies discovered in Grays Harbor were the result of accidental deaths caused by unsafe conditions on the docks and in the timber industry. Goings also proposes Gohl was unjustly blamed for these deaths by influential local businessmen hoping to do away with a powerful figure in the local labor movement.

== Occupation and murders ==
Little is known about Gohl's early life, though at one point as an adult he went to the Yukon chasing gold. He was unsuccessful, and on his return to Aberdeen he took on work as a bartender. During this time, it was alleged that he may have been responsible for numerous murders. The bodies of migrant workers were found after washing up on the shores, robbed of any valuables or money they were known to have. From 1905 to 1910, 40 bodies were found floating near Aberdeen. Gohl was accused of starting a fire which burned a saloon in Alaska. Contemporary news reported that a Jacob Miller and wife had "vanished" while living in a cabin owned by Gohl on Laidlaw Island near Westport, Washington. In March 1912, a human skull was found buried near the cabin owned by Gohl; another skull had previously been found near the same spot on a beach and was thought to have been of "Red" Miller who had disappeared and was believed to have been Gohl's victim. Gohl was employed as a union official at the Sailors' Union of the Pacific (SUP). Already an accomplished criminal, Gohl was accused of being responsible for many of the large numbers of deceased migrant workers that were found washed up on shore during his tenure as a bartender, as well as a number of other crimes.

In 1905, during a major waterfront labor strike Gohl was charged with "assembling men under arms", and was also accused of forcibly abducting non-union crewmen from the schooner Fearless for which he was fined $1,250 in the Superior Court. As a union official, Gohl used his reputation and intimidating size to discourage strikes and recruit new union members.

Gohl is believed to have used the SUP building as a location for his crimes, both in providing victims, and in concealing the evidence of their murders. Sailors arriving in the port of Aberdeen would usually visit the SUP building soon after disembarking. There they could collect their mail and, if they wished, set some money aside in savings.

Gohl would usually be on duty, alone. Typically, Gohl would ask if the sailors had any family or friends in the area. Then he would turn the conversation to the topic of money and valuables. If the sailor was just passing through, and would not be missed by anyone in the area, and had more than a trivial amount of cash or valuables on hand, Gohl would choose him as his next victim.

Gohl was accused of killing his victims in the union building by shooting them, relieving them of their money and valuables, and disposing of them in the Wishkah River, which ran behind the building and into Grays Harbor. According to some reports, there was a chute which descended from a trapdoor in the building directly into the river. Other reports state that Gohl would use a small launch to murder his victims and dump the bodies directly in the harbor. Though suspected of being responsible for the large number of sailors who would disembark in Aberdeen and disappear, nothing was done to stop him until an accomplice, John Klingenberg, was brought back to the city after trying to jump ship in Mexico to escape prosecution, or possibly to escape Gohl.

== Arrest ==
Klingenberg was able to testify to seeing Gohl alone with a sailor, Charles Hatberg (or Hatteberg), whose body had recently been found in the harbor at Indian Creek February 2, 1910, soon after his disappearance on December 21, 1909. Hatberg had been shot with a .38 Automatic pistol which had been found in the salt flats by his body. The ownership of the gun was traced to Gohl. The motive to kill Hatberg, according to Klingenburg's confession, was that Gohl claimed Hatberg had told a "detective Miller" that Gohl had illegally shot a cow the previous summer.

Gohl had already been arrested in February 1910 for the Hatberg murder. The SUP did not come to his aid, according to contemporary media, and he was ultimately convicted of two counts of murder though suspected of 41 or more, found guilty May 12, 1910 and sentenced to life imprisonment and taken to the State Prison June 13, 1910. Besides Hatberg, the second count was for the murder of John Hoffman, a witness to the Hatberg murder who was shot and injured by Gohl on the night of the murder, and killed the next day by Klingenberg, for which Klingenberg was sentenced to 20 years.

Hoffman had been killed December 23, 1909, after the Hatberg killing, and had been robbed of $450 and also disposed of in the harbor near Indian Creek. In July 1910, a human skeleton was found in Indian Creek; however, it is not known whether these were the remains of Hoffman. Other corpses found in the Grays Harbor area were suggested to be victims of Gohl, including the body of Carl O. Carlson, found on April 27, 1910, floating in the harbor. Gohl was later transferred to an asylum for the criminally insane, where he died in 1927. He is buried in an open field above West Medical Lake, at Washington's Eastern State Hospital.

== See also ==
- List of serial killers in the United States
