= Ocosta Elementary School =

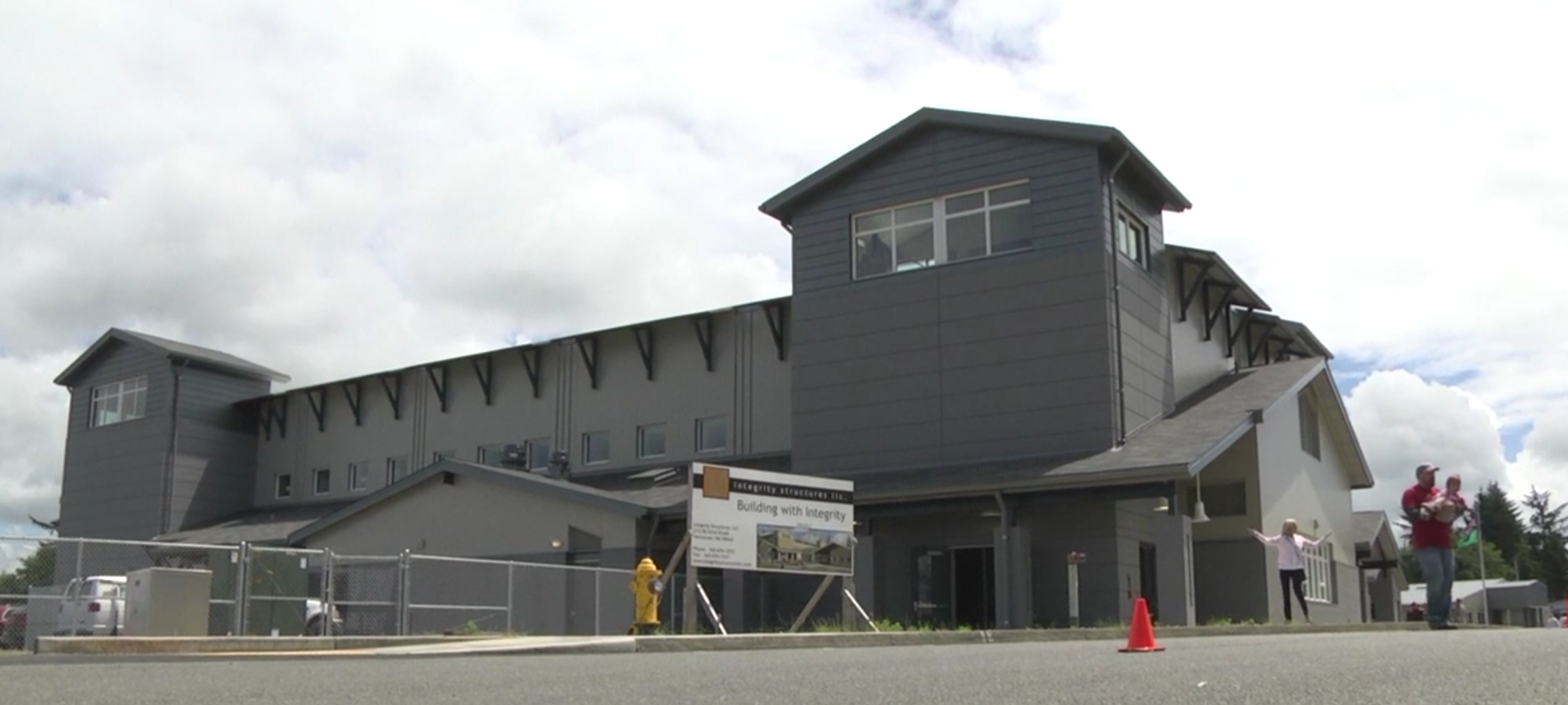
- Ocosta Elementary School exterior shortly after construction

Location
- 2580 South Montesano Street; Westport, Washington; United States; 46.86217°N 124.09981°W

Information
- Type: Elementary school
- Established: 1967
- School district: Ocosta School District
- Principal: Syndi Richer
- Faculty: 27
- Grades: Preschool to 6th grade
- Enrollment: 328 students (2014–15)
- Mascot: Wildcats
- Website: www.ocosta.k12.wa.us/page/elementary-school

Ocosta Elementary School is a public elementary school in Westport, Washington, operated by the Ocosta School District.

Part of the original elementary school was replaced in 2016 with a new facility featuring the first public tsunami refuge to be constructed in the United States, located atop the gym, 53 feet (16 m) above sea level.

== History ==
The school district originally used a round building on the current campus built in 1967 and demolished in 2014. The elementary school was split from the junior/senior high school in the 1980s, and later expanded with new wings.

On April 23, 2013, a $13.8 million bond issue was approved by 70 percent of voters to fund the construction of a new elementary school with modern features, including a tsunami shelter. The school district broke ground on the project in January 2015, and was dedicated on June 11, 2016.

The school moved classes into the new addition during the fall of 2016.

== Enrollment ==
As of the 2014–15 school year, Ocosta Elementary School has an enrollment of 328 students and a 26-member faculty.

== Design ==
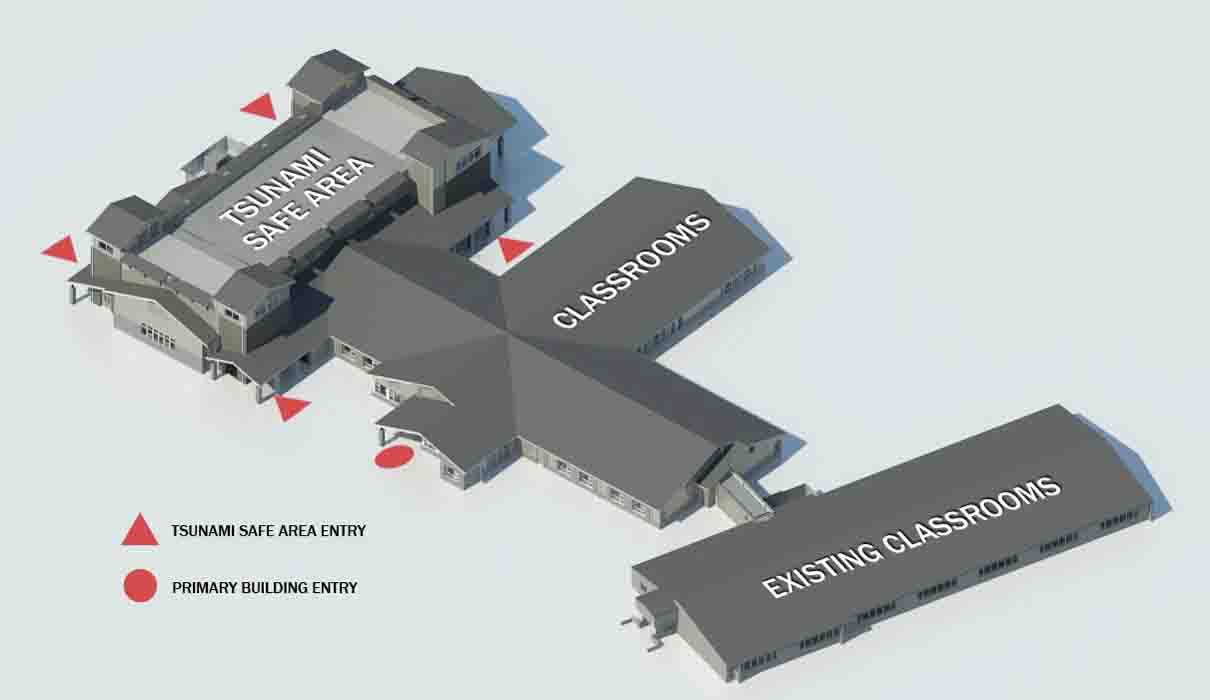
Rendering of the Ocosta Elementary School campus

The school consists of three buildings, connected by covered passageways. The main building, underneath the tsunami shelter, has 23 classrooms and houses the administrative offices and gym.

The new addition was designed by TCF Architecture of Tacoma, Washington, and engineered by Degenkolb Engineers of Seattle. The gymnasium's interior includes historic photographs of the region and finishes resembling beach glass, sea grass, cranberry bogs and a compass rose furnished by local artisans.

=== Tsunami shelter ===
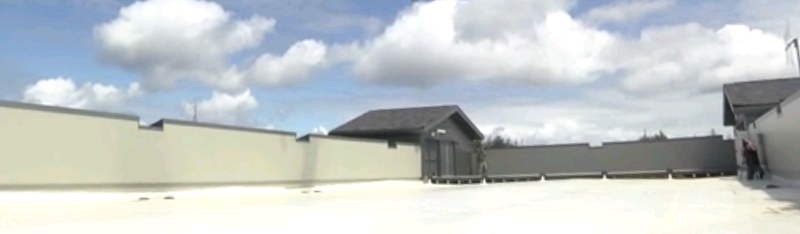
Rooftop tsunami shelter

In the event of a Cascadia subduction zone earthquake off the Washington coast, evacuation from the vicinity of the school would be by vehicle on single-lane State Route 105 and would have to get all the children to safety off the low-lying peninsula within a 30-minute window between National Tsunami Warning Center's alert and the arrival of a 40-foot (12 m) tsunami. Realistic travel time to high ground in an emergency has been estimated to be around 100 minutes, more than three times as long as the margin of safety.

To provide for vertical evacuation instead, the school's tsunami shelter is located on the roof of the gym, elevated 53 feet (16 m) above sea level to withstand surges that would follow such an earthquake. The gym is accessible via four staircases, including one from the outside, designed to be wide for quicker evacuation and built with 14-inch (360 mm) thick concrete and steel rebar. The shelter is designed to accommodate the students and staff of both the elementary school and the adjoining junior–senior high school, a total of 700 people, with room for some members of the public; the total capacity is estimated to be between 1,000 and 2,000 people.

The building and shelter are secured to the ground by 169 pilings driven 50 feet (15 m) into the ground. It is rated to withstand a 9.2-magnitude earthquake (which would be one of the largest ever recorded) and has a 6-foot (1.8 m) parapet to shield against tsunami surges. The pilings, which form the main structure for the shelter, were considered a cost-effective way to build new tsunami-resistant shelters; the shelter only added 20 percent to the Ocosta Elementary School's $13 million construction budget. Concrete and steel were chosen as the building's main structural materials after observations made during the 2011 Tōhoku earthquake and tsunami, where concrete buildings were the least damaged.
