= Ocosta, Washington =

Unincorporated community in Washington, US

Coordinates: 46°53′19″N 124°02′19″W

- CDP
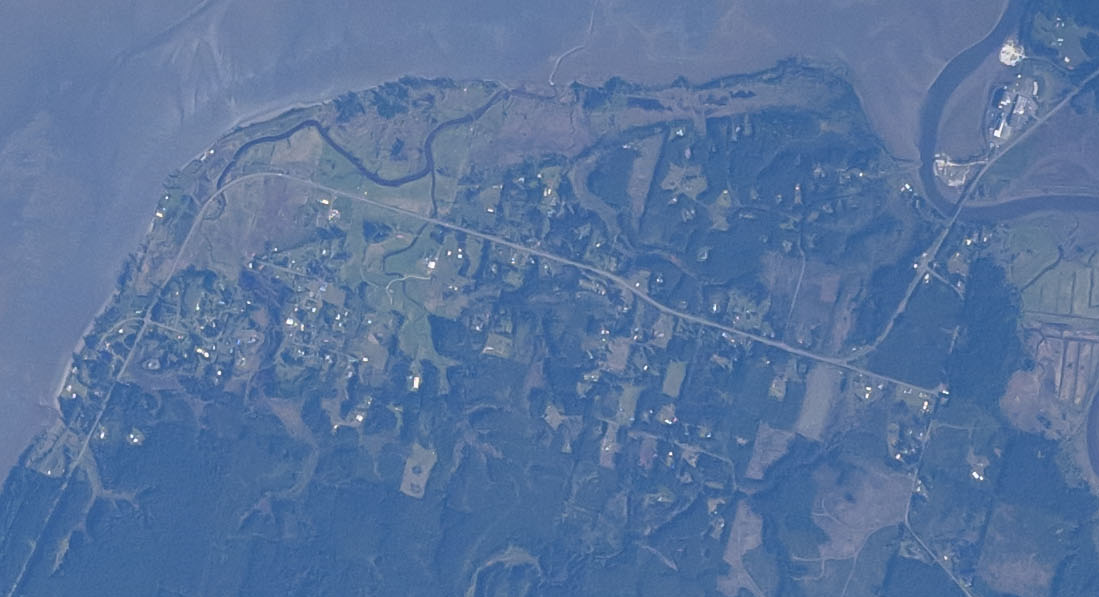
- Ocosta seen from ISS Expedition 71, April 2024
- Interactive map of Ocosta, Washington
- Country: United States
- State: Washington
- County: Grays Harbor
- Incorporated: July 29, 1891
- Disincorporated: November 25, 1932
- Time zone: UTC-8 (Pacific (PST))
  - Summer (DST): UTC-7 (PDT)
- GNIS feature ID: 2807186

Ocosta is an unincorporated community and former town in Grays Harbor County, in the U.S. state of Washington. It is a census-designated place with a population of 502 residents as of the 2020 census. Ocosta was disincorporated in 1932.

== History ==
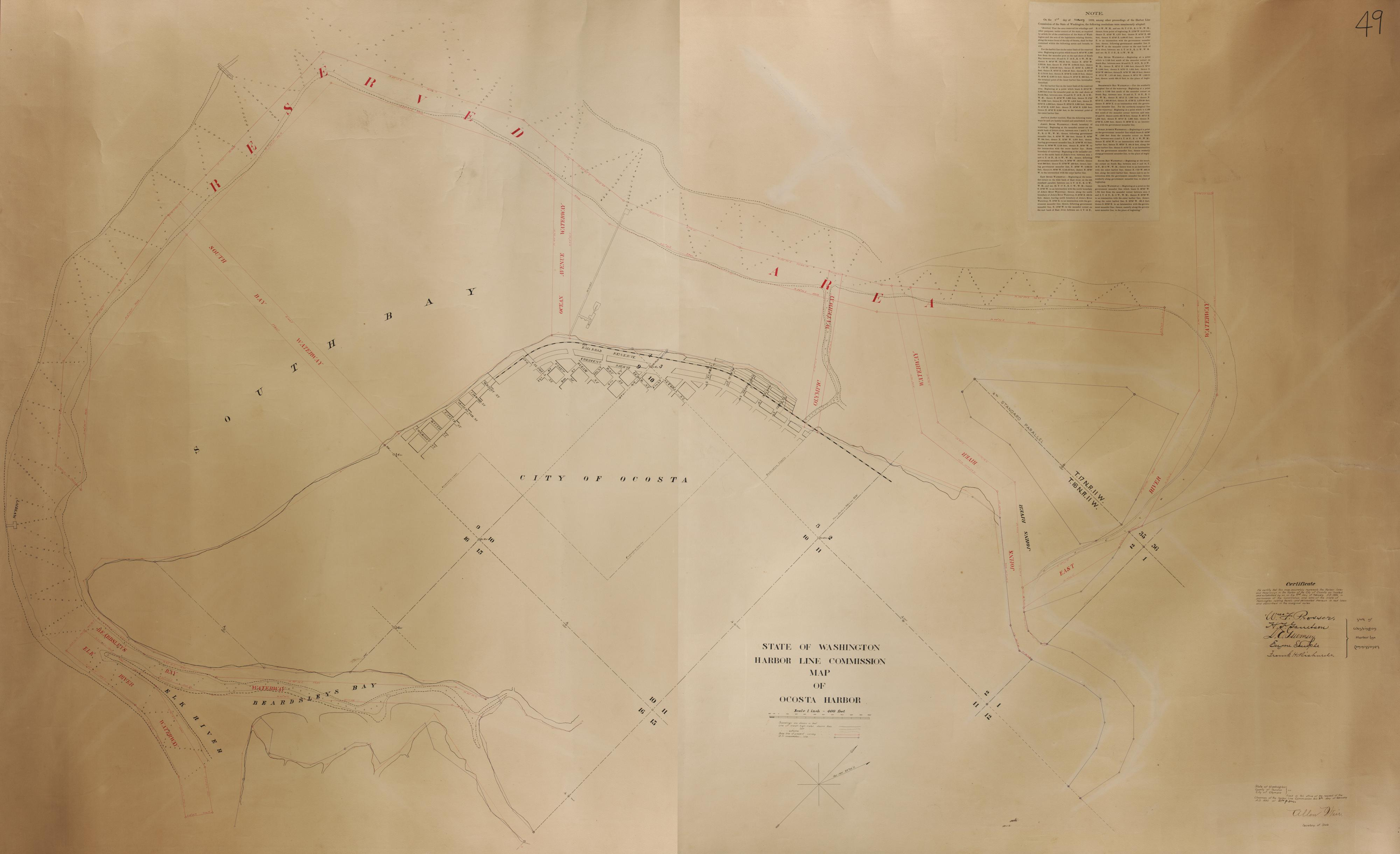
Map of Ocosta Harbor, c. 1892

Ocosta-by-the-Sea, as the community was originally called, was named for the nearby Pacific Ocean coast. It was the product of a disagreement between Aberdeen and the Northern Pacific Railroad (NP). In those days, it was common for the NP to accept a cash incentive from a town that wished to connect to the system. Aberdeen refused to pay, and the NP established the town in an attempt to bypass the city. Ocosta was incorporated as a city on July 29, 1891, eight days after a local election.

Ocosta became the westernmost point on the telegraph network on April 22, 1892, and was followed by the arrival of the Northern Pacific on May 7 to commemorate the 200th anniversary of the 1792 expedition into Grays Harbor. The Northern Pacific found Ocosta's harbor and shoreline unsuitable for their needs and instead struck a deal with Aberdeen to build a spur into the city. When the 1893 financial panic occurred, the Northern Pacific ultimately halted progress, and the city of Aberdeen finished the spur, using rails from a sunken barque.

On November 19, 1932, the Town of Ocosta, a city of the fourth class, was approved for disincorporation by town residents at a special election by a vote to 58 votes in favor to 5 votes against disincorporation. At the time of the election, 80 people lived within the Town of Ocosta. The disincorporation took effect on November 25.

A post office called Ocosta was established in 1890, and remained in operation until 1943. The ZIP Code for Ocosta is 98520.

== Demographics ==
Historical population
Census	Pop.	Note	%±
2020	502		—
U.S. Decennial Census

Ocosta first appeared as a census designated place in the 2020 U.S. census.

=== Racial and ethnic composition ===
Ocosta CDP, Washington – Racial and ethnic composition Note: the US Census treats Hispanic/Latino as an ethnic category. This table excludes Latinos from the racial categories and assigns them to a separate category. Hispanics/Latinos may be of any race.
Race / Ethnicity (NH = Non-Hispanic)	Pop 2020	2020
White alone (NH)	430	85.66%
Black or African American alone (NH)	0	0.00%
Native American or Alaska Native alone (NH)	9	1.79%
Asian alone (NH)	8	1.59%
Native Hawaiian or Pacific Islander alone (NH)	0	0.00%
Other race alone (NH)	0	0.00%
Mixed race or Multiracial (NH)	28	5.58%
Hispanic or Latino (any race)	27	5.38%
Total	502	100.00%

== Education ==
It is in the Ocosta School District.
