= Westport Airport (Washington) =

Airport in Grays Harbor County, Washington, United States

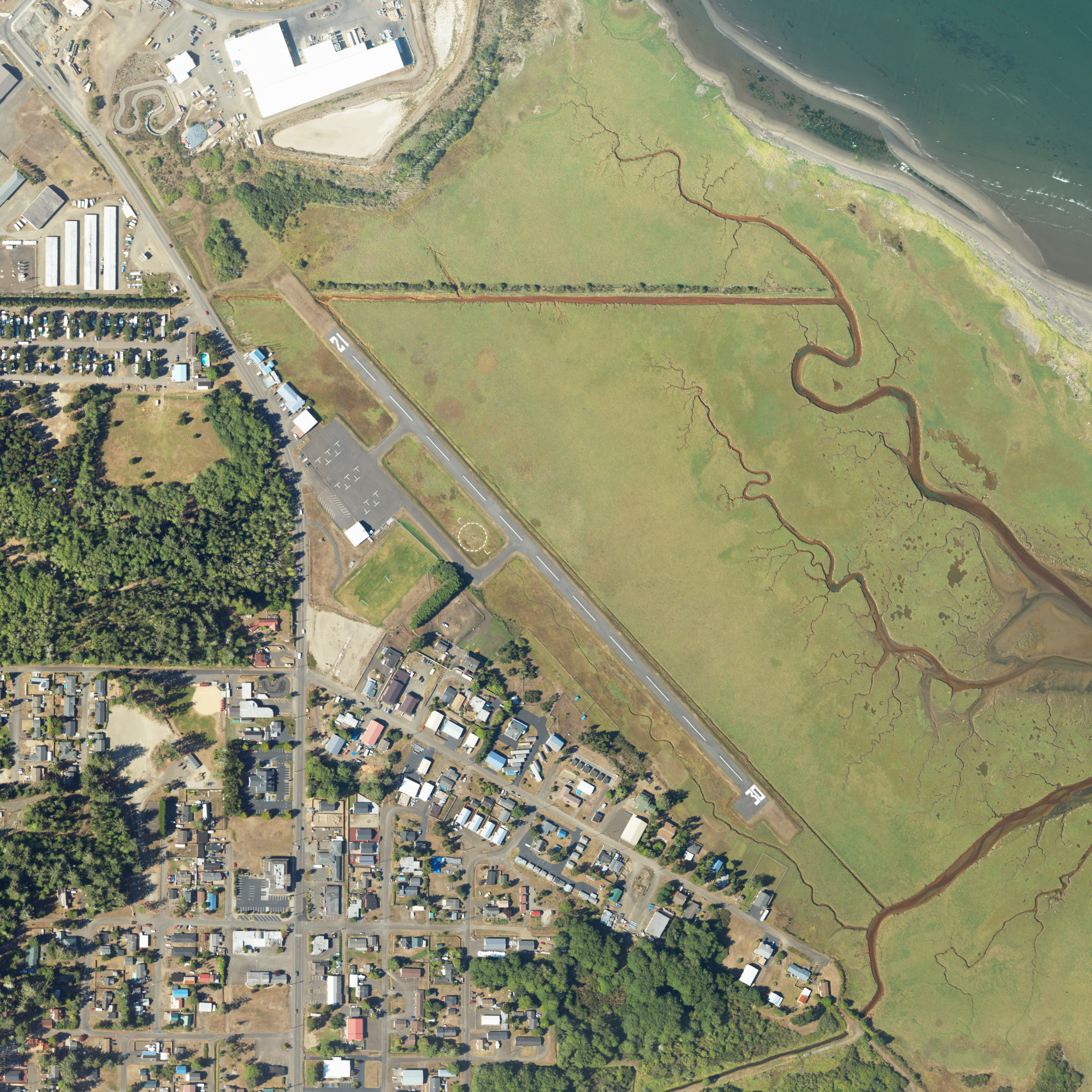
- Airport in August 2023
- IATA: none; ICAO: none; FAA LID: 14S

Summary
- Airport type: Public
- Owner: City of Westport
- Serves: Westport, Washington
- Elevation AMSL: 14 ft / 4 m
- Coordinates: 46°53′49″N 124°06′03″W

Map
- Location of airport in Washington 14S (the United States)

Runways
Direction	Length		Surface
Direction	ft	m	Surface
12/30	2,318	707	Asphalt

Statistics (2022)
- Aircraft operations: 1,000
- Based aircraft: 1
- Source: Federal Aviation Administration

Westport Airport (FAA LID: 14S) is a city-owned, public-use airport located one nautical mile (2 km) north of the central business district of Westport, a city in Grays Harbor County, Washington, United States.

== Facilities and aircraft ==
Westport Airport covers an area of 30 acres (12 ha) at an elevation of 14 feet (4 m) above mean sea level. It has one runway designated 12/30 with an asphalt surface measuring 2,318 by 50 feet (707 x 15 m).

For the 12-month period ending December 31, 2022, the airport had 1,000 aircraft operations, an average of 83 per month: 100% general aviation. At that time there was one aircraft based at this airport, one single-engine.

== See also ==
- List of airports in Washington
