= Aberdeen, Washington =

City in Washington, United States

- City
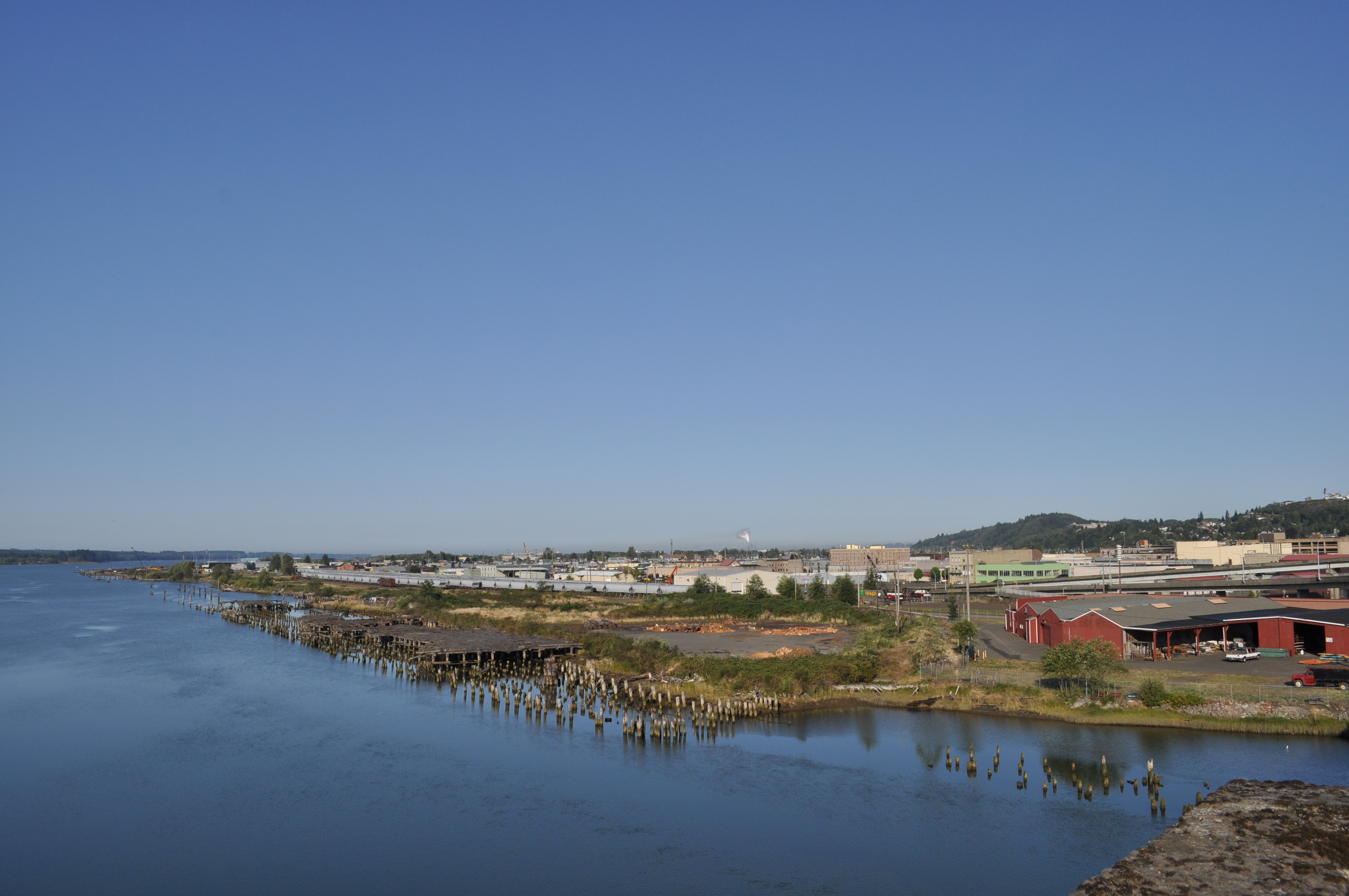
- Downtown & Wishkah River from Route 101

- Flag
- Nickname: Gateway to the Olympics
- Motto: Come As You Are
- Interactive map of Aberdeen, Washington
- Location within Washington (state) Location within the United States
- Coordinates: 46°57′31″N 123°48′38″W
- Country: United States
- State: Washington
- County: Grays Harbor
- Founded: 1884
- Incorporated: May 12, 1890

Government
  - Type: Mayor–council
  - Mayor: Douglas Orr

Area
  - City: 12.58 sq mi (32.57 km^{2})
  - Land: 10.87 sq mi (28.16 km^{2})
  - Water: 1.70 sq mi (4.41 km^{2})
- Elevation: 3 ft (0.91 m)

Population (2020)
  - City: 17,013
  - Estimate (2023): 17,014
  - Density: 1,564.8/sq mi (604.19/km^{2})
  - Urban: 26,603
  - Metro: 77,290
- Demonym: Aberdonian
- Time zone: UTC−8 (Pacific (PST))
  - Summer (DST): UTC−7 (PDT)
- ZIP Code: 98520
- Area codes: 360 and 564
- FIPS code: 53-00100
- GNIS feature ID: 2409655
- Website: aberdeenwa.gov

Aberdeen (/ˈæbərdiːn/ AB-ər-deen) is a city in Grays Harbor County, Washington, United States. The population was 17,013 at the 2020 census. The city is the most populous in Grays Harbor County and the region's economic center, bordering the cities of Hoquiam and Cosmopolis. Aberdeen is occasionally referred to as the "Gateway to the Olympic Peninsula".

== History ==
Samuel Benn, a New York City native, established a homestead on the Chehalis River in 1859. He later platted a town at the site named Aberdeen. According to accounts collected by historian Edmond S. Meany, the name has two possible origins: from the Ilwaco-based Aberdeen Packing Company, which opened a cannery on the homestead in 1873; or from the Scottish city of Aberdeen, named by an early settler who had lived in Scotland. Like the Scottish city, Aberdeen is a port settlement situated at the mouth of two rivers—the Chehalis and the Wishkah. An earlier name for the settlement was Heraville, which was recorded by Benn.

The city was founded by Samuel Benn in 1884 and incorporated on May 12, 1890. Although it became the largest and best-known city in Grays Harbor, Aberdeen lagged behind nearby Hoquiam and Cosmopolis in its early years. When A.J. West built the town's first sawmill in 1894, the other two municipalities had been in business for several years. Aberdeen and its neighbors vied to be the terminus for Northern Pacific Railroad, but instead of ending at one of the established mill towns, the railroad skimmed through Cosmopolis and headed west for Ocosta. Hoquiam and Aberdeen citizens together built a spur; in 1895, the line connected Northern Pacific tracks to Aberdeen.

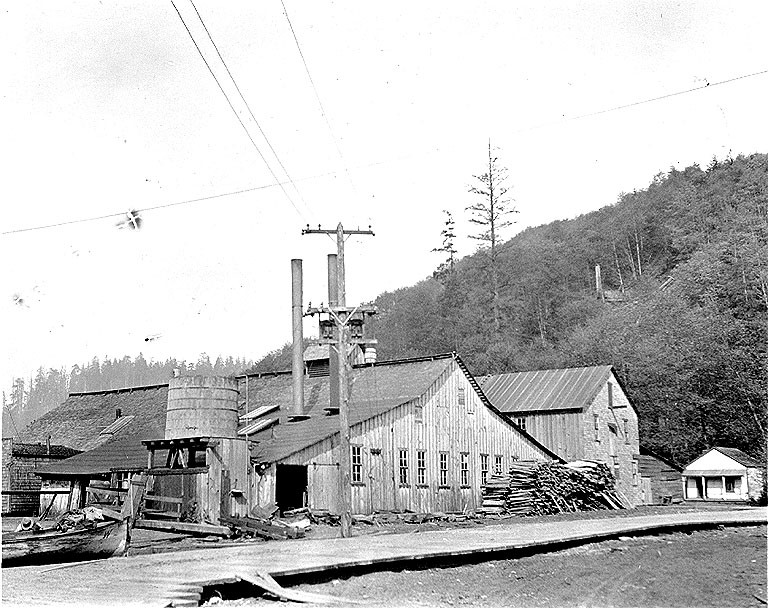
Ellmore Packing Co. clam and salmon cannery in Aberdeen, 1915

By 1900, Aberdeen had become home to many saloons, brothels, and gambling establishments. It was nicknamed both "The Hellhole of the Pacific" and "The Port of Missing Men" due to its high murder rate. One notable resident was Billy Gohl, known locally as Billy "Ghoul", who was rumored to have killed at least 140 men; he disposed of the bodies in the Wishkah River. Gohl was ultimately convicted of two murders.

Aberdeen was hit hard during the Great Depression, with the number of major local sawmills reduced from 37 to 9. By the late 1970s, most of the area had been logged and the remaining mills closed during the next decade. By the early 1990s, the industry was decimated due to resource reduction. Local political and business leaders ignored this fact and did not pursue economic diversification.

== Geography ==
Aberdeen is at the eastern end of Grays Harbor, near the mouth of the Chehalis River and southwest of the Olympic Mountains. Grays Harbor is notable as the northernmost ria on North America's Pacific Coast because it has remained free of glaciers throughout the Quaternary due to unfavorable topography and warm temperatures. It is thought that, during glacial periods of the Quaternary, the Chehalis River was a major refugium for aquatic species, as was the west coast from the Olympic Peninsula southward for plants that later formed the northern part of the Pacific temperate rainforest in formerly glaciated areas.

According to the United States Census Bureau, the city has a total area of 12.58 square miles (32.58 km^{2}), of which 10.87 square miles (28.15 km^{2}) is land and 1.70 square miles (4.40 km^{2}) is water.

=== Climate ===
Aberdeen experiences a climate on the boundary between Mediterranean (Köppen Csb) and oceanic (Köppen Cfb). Although rainfall is extremely high between October and March, July and August still have a distinct excess of evaporation over rainfall. Temperatures are generally very mild due to the proximity of the Pacific Ocean. Snow is very common but usually light, with one exception being December 1964 during which 22.3 inches or 0.57 metres fell. Occasionally, southeasterly winds can cause very high temperatures. For example, in August 1981, the temperature in Aberdeen reached 105 °F (40.6 °C).

Climate data for Aberdeen, Washington, (1991–2020 normals, extremes 1891–2022)
Month	Jan	Feb	Mar	Apr	May	Jun	Jul	Aug	Sep	Oct	Nov	Dec	Year
Record high °F (°C)	66 (19)	73 (23)	82 (28)	88 (31)	92 (33)	96 (36)	105 (41)	105 (41)	100 (38)	86 (30)	73 (23)	63 (17)	108 (42)
Mean maximum °F (°C)	55.8 (13.2)	60.6 (15.9)	67.6 (19.8)	73.9 (23.3)	81.4 (27.4)	81.9 (27.7)	84.5 (29.2)	87.1 (30.6)	85.0 (29.4)	75.6 (24.2)	61.1 (16.2)	55.6 (13.1)	92.2 (33.4)
Mean daily maximum °F (°C)	47.8 (8.8)	50.3 (10.2)	53.3 (11.8)	56.6 (13.7)	61.4 (16.3)	64.7 (18.2)	68.2 (20.1)	69.3 (20.7)	68.7 (20.4)	61.0 (16.1)	52.3 (11.3)	47.0 (8.3)	58.4 (14.7)
Daily mean °F (°C)	42.5 (5.8)	43.5 (6.4)	45.8 (7.7)	48.8 (9.3)	54.0 (12.2)	58.0 (14.4)	61.2 (16.2)	61.8 (16.6)	59.9 (15.5)	52.9 (11.6)	45.9 (7.7)	41.7 (5.4)	51.3 (10.7)
Mean daily minimum °F (°C)	37.3 (2.9)	36.7 (2.6)	38.4 (3.6)	41.1 (5.1)	46.6 (8.1)	51.2 (10.7)	54.2 (12.3)	54.4 (12.4)	51.1 (10.6)	44.8 (7.1)	39.6 (4.2)	36.5 (2.5)	44.3 (6.8)
Mean minimum °F (°C)	27.2 (−2.7)	27.6 (−2.4)	30.3 (−0.9)	32.9 (0.5)	37.6 (3.1)	44.1 (6.7)	48.2 (9.0)	47.9 (8.8)	43.1 (6.2)	34.7 (1.5)	29.3 (−1.5)	26.8 (−2.9)	23.2 (−4.9)
Record low °F (°C)	6 (−14)	8 (−13)	18 (−8)	20 (−7)	25 (−4)	32 (0)	34 (1)	36 (2)	30 (−1)	19 (−7)	11 (−12)	6 (−14)	6 (−14)
Average precipitation inches (mm)	13.93 (354)	8.58 (218)	9.76 (248)	6.28 (160)	3.46 (88)	2.40 (61)	0.91 (23)	1.52 (39)	2.73 (69)	8.27 (210)	13.72 (348)	13.38 (340)	84.94 (2,157)
Average snowfall inches (cm)	0.0 (0.0)	0.1 (0.25)	0.2 (0.51)	0.0 (0.0)	0.0 (0.0)	0.0 (0.0)	0.0 (0.0)	0.0 (0.0)	0.0 (0.0)	0.0 (0.0)	0.2 (0.51)	0.0 (0.0)	0.5 (1.3)
Average precipitation days (≥ 0.01 inch)	22.2	18.6	21.7	19.1	13.6	12.4	6.6	6.9	9.4	17.6	21.5	22.5	192.1
Average snowy days (≥ 0.1 in)	0.0	0.1	0.0	0.0	0.0	0.0	0.0	0.0	0.0	0.0	0.2	0.0	0.3
Source: NOAA

== Demographics ==
Historical population
Census	Pop.	Note	%±
1890	1,638		—
1900	3,747		128.8%
1910	13,660		264.6%
1920	15,337		12.3%
1930	21,723		41.6%
1940	18,846		−13.2%
1950	19,653		4.3%
1960	18,741		−4.6%
1970	18,489		−1.3%
1980	18,739		1.4%
1990	16,565		−11.6%
2000	16,461		−0.6%
2010	16,896		2.6%
2020	17,013		0.7%
2023 (est.)	17,014		0.0%
U.S. Decennial Census; 2020 Census

=== Racial and ethnic composition ===
Aberdeen, Washington – racial and ethnic composition Note: the US Census treats Hispanic/Latino as an ethnic category. This table excludes Latinos from the racial categories and assigns them to a separate category. Hispanics/Latinos may be of any race.
Race / ethnicity (NH = non-Hispanic)	Pop. 2000	Pop. 2010	Pop. 2020	% 2000	% 2010	% 2020
White alone (NH)	13,530	12,610	11,530	82.19%	74.63%	67.77%
Black or African American alone (NH)	62	118	202	0.38%	0.70%	1.19%
Native American or Alaska Native alone (NH)	552	515	540	3.35%	3.05%	3.17%
Asian alone (NH)	331	302	308	2.01%	1.79%	1.81%
Native Hawaiian or Pacific Islander alone (NH)	21	45	32	0.13%	0.27%	0.19%
Other race alone (NH)	16	19	91	0.10%	0.11%	0.53%
Mixed race or multiracial (NH)	431	609	1,102	2.62%	3.60%	6.48%
Hispanic or Latino (any race)	1,518	2,678	3,208	9.22%	15.85%	18.86%
Total	16,461	16,896	17,013	100.00%	100.00%	100.00%

=== 2020 census ===
As of the 2020 census, there were 17,013 people, 6,449 households, and 3,881 families residing in the city. The population density was 1,564.7 inhabitants per square mile (604.1/km^{2}). There were 7,236 housing units at an average density of 665.5 inhabitants per square mile (257.0/km^{2}).

The median age was 38.7 years. 6.2% of residents were under 5 years of age, 23.3% of residents were under the age of 18, and 17.4% were 65 years of age or older. For every 100 females there were 101.0 males, and for every 100 females age 18 and over there were 100.9 males age 18 and over.

97.3% of residents lived in urban areas, while 2.7% lived in rural areas.

Of the 6,449 households, 29.5% had children under the age of 18 living in them. Of all households, 36.0% were married-couple households, 23.1% were households with a male householder and no spouse or partner present, and 29.8% were households with a female householder and no spouse or partner present. About 30.9% of all households were made up of individuals and 13.7% had someone living alone who was 65 years of age or older.

Housing units had a 10.9% vacancy rate. The homeowner vacancy rate was 2.1% and the rental vacancy rate was 5.5%.

Racial composition as of the 2020 census
Race	Number	Percent
White	12,282	72.2%
Black or African American	223	1.3%
American Indian and Alaska Native	682	4.0%
Asian	315	1.9%
Native Hawaiian and Other Pacific Islander	36	0.2%
Some other race	1,631	9.6%
Two or more races	1,844	10.8%

=== 2010 census ===
As of the 2010 census, there were 16,896 people, 6,476 households, and 4,020 families residing in the city. The population density was 1,586.0 inhabitants per square mile (612.4/km^{2}). There were 7,338 housing units at an average density of 689.0 per square mile (266.0/km^{2}). The racial makeup was 80.40% White, 0.80% African American, 3.65% Native American, 1.89% Asian, 0.29% Pacific Islander, 8.04% from some other races and 4.93% from two or more races. Hispanic or Latino people of any race were 15.85% of the population.

There were 6,476 households, of which 33.1% had children under the age of 18 living with them, 39.9% were married couples living together, 15.0% had a female householder with no spouse present, 7.1% had a male householder with no spouse present, and 37.9% were non-families. 29.2% of all households were made up of individuals, and 10.8% had someone living alone who was 65 years of age or older. The average household size was 2.56 and the average family size was 3.10.

The median age in the city was 35.6 years. 24.9% of residents were under the age of 18; 10.5% were between the ages of 18 and 24; 25.8% were from 25 to 44; 26% were from 45 to 64; and 13% were 65 years of age or older. The gender makeup of the city was 49.8% male and 50.2% female.

=== American Community Survey ===
As of the 2022 American Community Survey, there are 6,441 estimated households in Aberdeen with an average of 2.59 persons per household. The city has a median household income of $50,008. Approximately 21.0% of the city's population lives at or below the poverty line. Aberdeen has an estimated 54.6% employment rate, with 16.6% of the population holding a bachelor's degree or higher and 84.8% holding a high school diploma.

The top five reported ancestries (people were allowed to report up to two ancestries, thus the figures will generally add to more than 100%) were English (83.7%), Spanish (14.1%), Other Indo-European (0.5%), Asian and Pacific Islander (0.9%), and Other (0.8%).

=== Crime ===
Aberdeen
- Crime rates* (2023)

Violent crimes
- Homicide: 0
- Rape: 21
- Robbery: 14
- Aggravated assault: 42
- Total violent crime: 77

Property crimes
- Burglary: 82
- Larceny-theft: 435
- Motor vehicle theft: 64
- Arson: 6
- Total property crime: 587
- Note: Reported crimes per 100,000 population Source: 2023 FBI UCR Data

According to the Uniform Crime Report statistics compiled by the Federal Bureau of Investigation (FBI) in 2023, there were 77 violent crimes and 587 property crimes per 100,000 residents. Of these, the violent crimes consisted of 0 murders, 21 forcible rapes, 14 robberies and 42 aggravated assaults, while 82 burglaries, 435 larceny-thefts, 64 motor vehicle thefts and 6 acts of arson defined the property offenses.

== Economy ==
Aberdeen and the rest of Grays Harbor remain dependent on timber, fishing, and tourism industries and as a regional service center for much of the Olympic Peninsula. Grays Harbor Community Hospital employees total more than 600 workers. Historically the area is dependent on harvesting and exporting natural resources. The Port of Grays Harbor is the largest coastal shipping port north of California. It is still a center for the export of logs on the west coast of the U.S. and has become one of the largest centers for the shipment of autos and grains to China and Korea.

On December 19, 2005, Weyerhaeuser made plans to close the Aberdeen large-log sawmill and the Cosmopolis pulp mill, and the closures took effect in early 2006. This resulted in the loss of at least 342 jobs. In January 2009, Weyerhaeuser closed two additional plants in Aberdeen, resulting in another 221 lost jobs. In both cases many employees were not told by Weyerhaeuser management, but learned about the closures from local radio stations who received a press release prior to a scheduled press conference.

Major employers in Grays Harbor include Westport Shipyard, Sierra Pacific Industries, the Quinault Indian Nation, The Simpson Door Company, Hoquiam Plywood, Pasha Automotive, Willis Enterprises, Ocean Gold Companies, Vaughn Company, and the Stafford Creek Corrections Center, a state prison which opened in 2000.

Other significant employers include the cranberry-growing cooperative Ocean Spray, worldwide retailer Walmart, Sidhu & Sons Nursery USA, Inc. (AKA Briggs Nursery), Overstock.com, and Washington Crab Producers.

In 2007, Imperium Renewables of Seattle invested $40 million in the construction of the biodiesel plant at the Port of Grays Harbor. It is estimated the plant will produce as much as 100 million US gallons (380,000 m^{3}) of biodiesel fuel made from plants and vegetable material annually.

In September 2010, the Weyerhaeuser Cosmopolis Pulp Mill was purchased by the Beverly Hills-based Gores Group and restarted as Cosmo Specialty Fibers, Inc. They started production of pulp on May 1, 2011. The mill closed in 2022 and was later fined $2.3 million for chemical leaks by the Department of Ecology.

=== Retail ===
The city had two indoor shopping malls that were developed in the 1970s and early 1980s. The Wishkah Mall east of downtown Aberdeen opened in August 1976 on the riverfront; this was followed in August 1981 by the South Shore Mall, which was south of the Chehalis River. The newer South Shore Mall had 350,000 square feet (33,000 m^{2}) and space for 80 retailers, including anchor tenants Sears and J.C. Penney following their relocation from downtown. It was renamed to the Shoppes at Riverside in 2016 and closed on February 13, 2021, following an engineering report that found the soil under the foundation had settled and would pose structural risks. A movie theater and fun center also closed later in two of the four anchor spaces at the mall, which is owned by Coming Attractions Theaters.

== Arts and culture ==
Aberdeen has the largest public library in Grays Harbor County. It is operated as part of the Timberland Regional Library system. The city originally had a Carnegie library that opened in 1908 and was replaced in 1966 by the current building. The Timberland Regional Library took over operations in 1969 and renovated the building in 2000.

The city's museum was located in a historic armory built in 1922. The building and the museum's collections were destroyed in a fire in 2018.

Aberdeen is also the home port of the tall ship Lady Washington, a reproduction of a smaller vessel used by the explorer Captain Robert Gray, featured in the Pirates of the Caribbean film The Curse of the Black Pearl.

== Parks and recreation ==
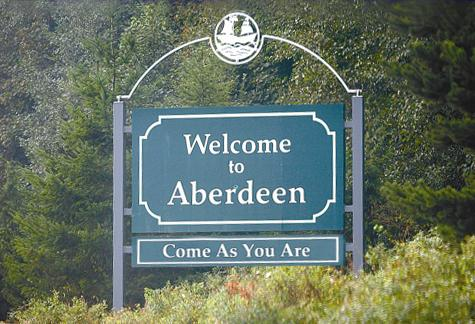
A tribute to Kurt Cobain features a quote from a Nirvana song.

Kurt Cobain Memorial Park was established in 2011, near where musician Kurt Cobain lived in Aberdeen. The park features a plaque with a quote from the song "Come as You Are".

== Education ==
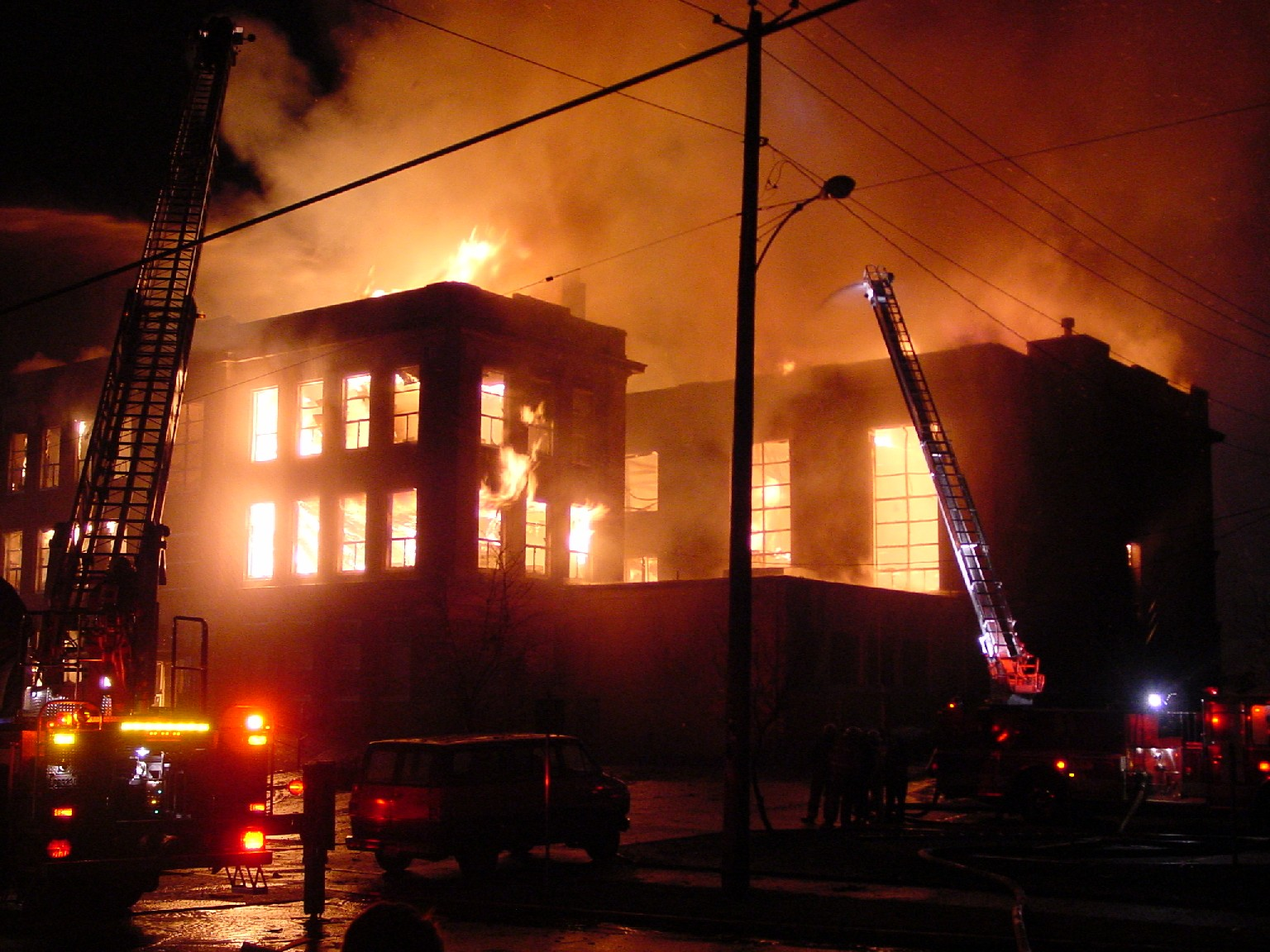
The Weatherwax building of Aberdeen High School burned down in 2002.

The city's school district has two high schools: J. M. Weatherwax High School, or Aberdeen High School as it is now called; and Harbor High School, an alternative high school with an enrollment exceeding 200 students. Aberdeen High has a long-time school sports rivalry with nearby Hoquiam High School.

In 2002, the Weatherwax building of Aberdeen High School, built in 1909, burned to the ground in an act of arson. The new building was completed in 2007 and held its grand opening on August 25, 2007.

Aberdeen School District also consists of one junior high: Miller Junior High; five elementary schools: Central Park Elementary, McDermoth Elementary, Stevens Elementary, AJ West Elementary and Robert Gray Elementary; and one Roman Catholic parochial school: St. Mary's Catholic School.

Aberdeen is home to Grays Harbor College, located in south Aberdeen. The school is represented by the Charlie Choker mascot. The college emphasizes student opportunities and has resources to help students transfer to a four-year college to complete a degree.

== Infrastructure ==
=== Transportation ===
Aberdeen is the western terminus of U.S. Route 12, a major highway that crosses Washington state and continues east to Detroit, Michigan. The city is bisected by U.S. Route 101, which crosses the Chehalis River and connects southwestern Washington to the western and northern Olympic Peninsula. From Aberdeen, U.S. Route 101 continues south to Cosmopolis and west to Hoquiam; it intersects several other highways that provide access to the coast, including State Route 105 in southern Aberdeen.

The city is also the hub for Grays Harbor Transit, which provides bus service for Aberdeen and surrounding cities. Its routes generally have trips that run every 30 minutes in Aberdeen and Hoquiam and at other frequencies between cities. Grays Harbor Transit also operates intercity routes to Olympia and has connections to other transit systems. Aberdeen Transit Center opened in March 1988 and was originally designed with a railroad depot motif.

== Notable people ==
- Robert Arthur, actor, gay rights activist
- Elton Bennett, artist
- Mark Bruener, NFL football player
- Trisha Brown, choreographer
- Jeff Burlingame, author
- Robert Cantwell, novelist
- Colin Cowherd, sports media personality
- Bryan Danielson, professional wrestler
- Calvin Fixx, writer
- Lee Friedlander, artist, photographer
- Billy Gohl, labor organizer, alleged serial killer
- Carrie Goldberg, attorney, author
- Victor Grinich, pioneer of Silicon Valley
- Gary Steven Krist, criminal (Barbara Mackle kidnapping)
- Walt Morey, writer, creator of Gentle Ben
- Robert Motherwell, painter of New York School
- Ed Murray, politician, Mayor of Seattle in 2014–17
- Peter Norton, author, computer programmer, founded Peter Norton Computing
- Douglas Osheroff, winner of Nobel Prize in Physics
- Craig Raymond, basketball player, 12th pick of 1967 NBA draft
- Wesley Carl Uhlman, politician
- Hank Woon, author, game designer, screenwriter
- John Workman, writer, artist
- Yukon Eric, professional wrestler

=== Musicians ===
- Kurt Cobain, of Nirvana
- Dale Crover, of Melvins
- Chris Freeman, of Pansy Division
- Matt Lukin, of Melvins and Mudhoney
- Krist Novoselic, of Nirvana
- Patrick Simmons, of The Doobie Brothers
- Kurdt Vanderhoof, of Metal Church, the Lewd, and Presto Ballet

== Sister cities ==
- Hakui, Ishikawa, Japan
- Kanazawa, Ishikawa, Japan
