= Twin Harbors State Park =

Recreation area in Washington state, United States of America

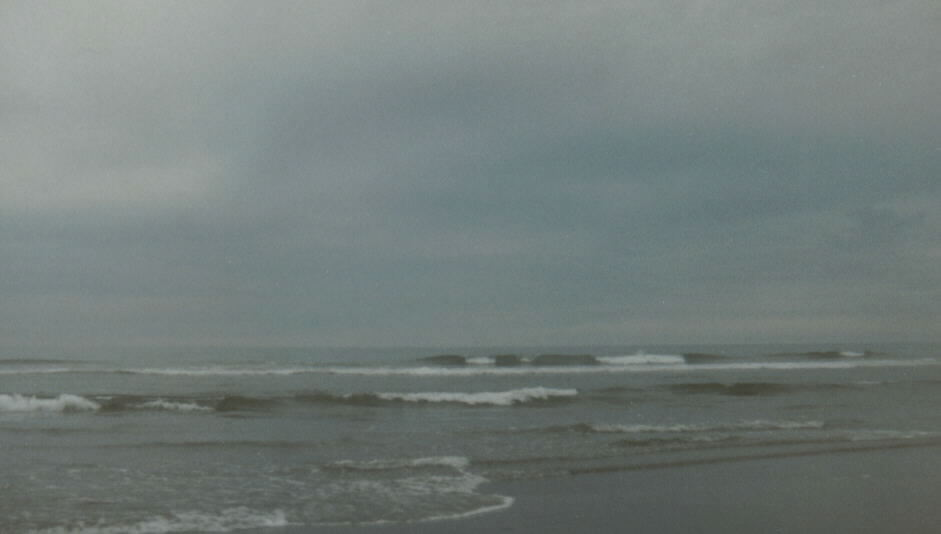
- Twin Harbors State Park, October 2007

- Location within Washington (state) Location within the United States
- Location: Grays Harbor County, Washington, United States
- Coordinates: 46°51′24″N 124°06′25″W
- Area: 225 acres (91 ha)
- Elevation: 16 ft (4.9 m)
- Established: 1937
- Administrator: Washington State Parks and Recreation Commission
- Website: Official website

Twin Harbors State Park is a public recreation area covering 225 acres (91 ha) on the Pacific Ocean two miles south of the town of Westport in Grays Harbor County, Washington. The site was once a U.S. Army training ground, which the state began acquiring for park use in 1937. The state park offers camping, fishing, clamming, beachcombing, and a half-mile interpretive trail in a shoreline pine forest.
