= Albert Grayland =

English cricketer (1900–1963)

Personal information
- Full name: Albert Victor Grayland
- Born: 24 March 1900; Birmingham, Warwickshire, England
- Died: 3 February 1963 (aged 62); Birmingham, Warwickshire, England
- Batting: Right-handed
- Bowling: Right-arm fast-medium

Domestic team information
- Years: Team
- 1922–1930: Warwickshire

Career statistics
Competition	First-class
Matches	4
Runs scored	15
Batting average	3.00
100s/50s	–/–
Top score	6
Balls bowled	335
Wickets	2
Bowling average	102.00
5 wickets in innings	–
10 wickets in match	–
Best bowling	1/23
Catches/stumpings	–/–
- Source: Cricinfo, 28 December 2011

Albert Victor Grayland (24 March 1900 – 3 February 1963) was an English cricketer. Grayland was a right-handed batsman who bowled right-arm fast-medium. He was born and died at Birmingham, Warwickshire.

Grayland made his first-class debut for Warwickshire against Somerset in the 1922 County Championship. He played a single match in 1923 against Worcestershire and a single match in 1924 against Somerset, before making a fourth and final first-class appearance against Surrey in 1930. In his four first-class matches, Grayland scored a total of 15 runs at an average of 3.00, with a high score of 6. With the ball, he took 2 wickets at a bowling average of 102.00, with best figures of 1/23.
