= Cohassett Beach, Washington =

- CDP
- Location of Cohassett Beach, Washington
- Coordinates: 46°51′56″N 124°06′18″W
- Country: United States
- State: Washington
- County: Grays Harbor

Area
  - Total: 1.3 sq mi (3.3 km^{2})
  - Land: 1.3 sq mi (3.3 km^{2})
  - Water: 0 sq mi (0.0 km^{2})
- Elevation: 16 ft (4.9 m)

Population (2020)
  - Total: 771
  - Density: 610/sq mi (230/km^{2})
- Time zone: UTC-8 (Pacific (PST))
  - Summer (DST): UTC-7 (PDT)
- ZIP Code: 98595
- Area code(s): 360, 564
- FIPS code: 53-13595
- GNIS feature ID: 2407645

Cohassett Beach is a census-designated place (CDP) in Grays Harbor County, Washington, United States. The population was 771 at the 2020 census.

The community derives its name from Cohasset, Massachusetts.

== History ==
Cohassett Beach is a historic part of the community of Westport. At the turn of the century, Cohassett Beach was a summer artists retreat and a few of the original homes remain however accretion of the beach to the west has altered the "oceanfront" aspect of that neighborhood. There is currently no physical area defined as Cohassett Beach however there is a new sub-division near the original that is named Cohasset Beach offering oceanfront and view homes. None of the census info listed before applies.

== Geography ==
According to the United States Census Bureau, the CDP has a total area of 1.3 square miles (3.3 km^{2}), all of it land.

== Demographics ==
Historical population
| Census | Pop. | Note | %± |
|---|---|---|---|
| 2000 | 618 | | — |
| 2010 | 722 | | 16.8% |
| 2020 | 771 | | 6.8% |
U.S. Decennial Census; 1990 2000 2010

Cohassett Beach first appeared as a census designated place in the 2000 U.S. census.

=== Racial and ethnic composition ===
Cohassett Beach CDP, Washington – Racial and ethnic composition Note: the US Census treats Hispanic/Latino as an ethnic category. This table excludes Latinos from the racial categories and assigns them to a separate category. Hispanics/Latinos may be of any race.
| Race / Ethnicity (NH = Non-Hispanic) | Pop 2000 | Pop 2010 | Pop 2020 | % 2000 | % 2010 | % 2020 |
|---|---|---|---|---|---|---|
| White alone (NH) | 583 | 619 | 546 | 94.34% | 85.73% | 70.82% |
| Black or African American alone (NH) | 1 | 3 | 5 | 0.16% | 0.42% | 0.65% |
| Native American or Alaska Native alone (NH) | 14 | 15 | 22 | 2.27% | 2.08% | 2.85% |
| Asian alone (NH) | 0 | 4 | 1 | 0.00% | 0.55% | 0.13% |
| Native Hawaiian or Pacific Islander alone (NH) | 1 | 1 | 1 | 0.16% | 0.14% | 0.13% |
| Other race alone (NH) | 0 | 0 | 6 | 0.00% | 0.00% | 0.78% |
| Mixed race or Multiracial (NH) | 14 | 16 | 70 | 2.27% | 2.22% | 9.08% |
| Hispanic or Latino (any race) | 5 | 64 | 120 | 0.81% | 8.86% | 15.56% |
| Total | 618 | 722 | 771 | 100.00% | 100.00% | 100.00% |

=== 2000 census ===
As of the census of 2000, there were 618 people, 307 households, and 168 families residing in the CDP. The population density was 489.6 people per square mile (189.4/km^{2}). There were 473 housing units at an average density of 374.7/sq mi (144.9/km^{2}). The racial makeup of the CDP was 94.82% White, 0.16% African American, 2.59% Native American, 0.16% Pacific Islander, and 2.27% from two or more races. Hispanic or Latino of any race were 0.81% of the population.

There were 307 households, out of which 19.9% had children under the age of 18 living with them, 46.3% were married couples living together, 4.2% had a female householder with no husband present, and 45.0% were non-families. 36.8% of all households were made up of individuals, and 16.9% had someone living alone who was 65 years of age or older. The average household size was 2.01 and the average family size was 2.60.

In the CDP, the population was spread out, with 16.7% under the age of 18, 4.9% from 18 to 24, 21.5% from 25 to 44, 31.9% from 45 to 64, and 25.1% who were 65 years of age or older. The median age was 48 years. For every 100 females, there were 96.8 males. For every 100 females age 18 and over, there were 98.1 males.

The median income for a household in the CDP was $26,490, and the median income for a family was $35,875. Males had a median income of $42,083 versus $36,938 for females. The per capita income for the CDP was $18,238. About 18.8% of families and 20.6% of the population were below the poverty line, including 35.5% of those under age 18 and 16.7% of those age 65 or over.

== Education ==
The community is served by the Ocosta School District.
