= Grays Harbor Biodiesel Plant =

Coordinates: 46°58′00″N 123°51′10″W

Grays Harbor Biodiesel Plant is the second largest biodiesel production facility in the United States, with an annual capacity of 100 million US gallons (380,000 m^{3}) per year. The facility is sited on a 12-acre (49,000 m^{2}) parcel of land at the Port of Grays Harbor, Washington.

The site includes eight main tanks, which can hold 2,000,000 US gallons (7,600 m^{3}) each, and two reserves that can each hold 500,000 US gallons (1,900 m^{3}). The facility is "feedstock agnostic," meaning it can create biodiesel from numerous different feedstocks, even simultaneously. The majority of their oil comes from canola oil and soybean oil grown in Canada and Washington.

In 2006, the National Biodiesel Board estimates that more than 250,000,000 US gallons (950,000 m^{3}) of biodiesel were consumed in the U.S., up from 75,000,000 in 2005.

Like other biodiesel production facilities around the country, the Imperium plant has been hit hard by the economic downturn and the drastic changes in the cost of petroleum fuels and biodiesel feedstocks. In early 2008 Imperium cut staff from the high of 107; again in March 2009 a further reduction brought the staff to 24..

In 2015, the plant was acquired by Renewable Energy Group, at which point the plant had 39 employees. Later that year, Renewable Energy Group added a new decanter and increased its production to 72.3 million US gallons (274,000 m^{3}) in 2016.
