= Grayland Beach State Park =

State park in Washington (state), United States

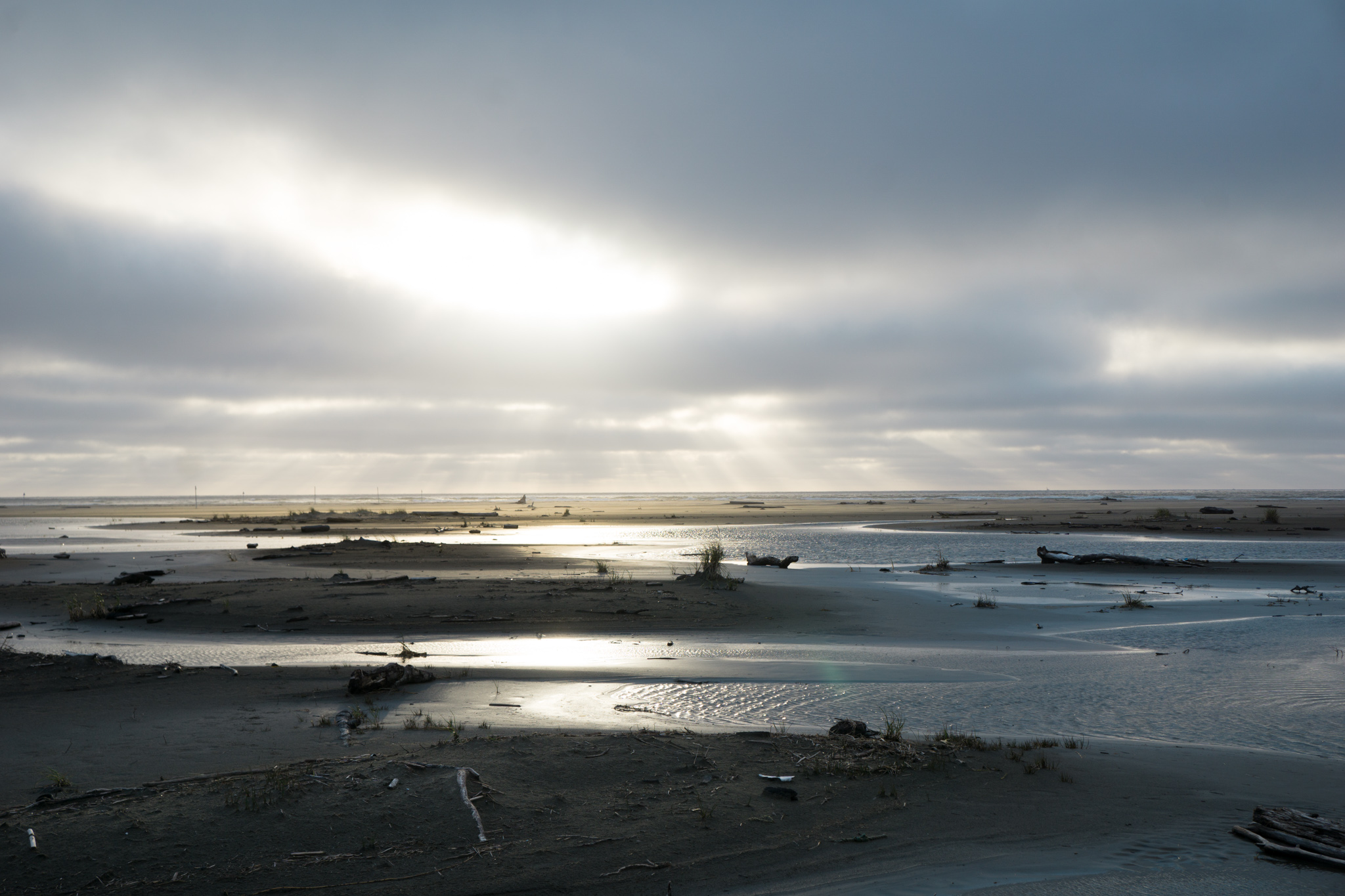

- Location within Washington (state) Location within the United States
- Location: Pacific County, Washington, United States
- Coordinates: 46°47′39″N 124°05′39″W
- Area: 581 acres (235 ha)
- Elevation: 16 ft (4.9 m)
- Established: 1959 (initial purchase)
- Administrator: Washington State Parks and Recreation Commission
- Visitors: 59,465 (in 2024)
- Website: Official website

Grayland Beach State Park is a public recreation area on the Pacific Ocean covering 581 acres (235 ha) along the southern edge of the census-designated community of Grayland in Pacific County, Washington. The state park offers camping, hiking, fishing, clamming, and beachcombing.
