= Grayland, Washington =

- CDP
- Interactive map of Grayland, Washington
- Location within Washington (state) Location within the United States Location within North America
- Coordinates: 46°49′49″N 124°05′23″W
- Country: United States
- State: Washington
- County: Grays Harbor

Area
  - Total: 6.88 sq mi (17.83 km^{2})
  - Land: 6.84 sq mi (17.71 km^{2})
  - Water: 0.046 sq mi (0.12 km^{2})
- Elevation: 16 ft (4.9 m)

Population (2020)
  - Total: 847
  - Density: 124/sq mi (47.8/km^{2})
- Time zone: UTC-8 (Pacific (PST))
  - Summer (DST): UTC-7 (PDT)
- ZIP Code: 98547
- Area code(s): 360, 564
- FIPS code: 53-28345
- GNIS feature ID: 2408323

Grayland is a census-designated place (CDP) in Grays Harbor County, Washington, United States. The population was 847 at the 2020 census.

== Geography ==
Grayland is located in the southwestern corner of Grays Harbor County. To the west is the Pacific Ocean, to the north is the city of Westport and the entrance to Grays Harbor. To the south is Pacific County.

According to the 2010 U.S. census, the CDP has a total area of 6.9 square miles (17.8 km^{2}) that is almost entirely land.

=== Climate ===
Most of the city can be classified with an oceanic climate (Cfb in the Köppen classification), similar to those found in the French west coast (Pays de la Loire) in near latitudes. At the same time as the city is the southern boundary of the Cfb on the coast of North America, beaches farther south as Heather can be classified as Csb, changing more in terms of precipitation.

=== Climate ===
Climate data for Grayland, Washington (1991–2020)
Month	Jan	Feb	Mar	Apr	May	Jun	Jul	Aug	Sep	Oct	Nov	Dec	Year
Mean daily maximum °F (°C)	48.6 (9.2)	51.3 (10.7)	53.4 (11.9)	56.3 (13.5)	60.1 (15.6)	63.5 (17.5)	65.9 (18.8)	67.5 (19.7)	66.7 (19.3)	60.1 (15.6)	52.6 (11.4)	48.4 (9.1)	57.9 (14.4)
Daily mean °F (°C)	43.1 (6.2)	44.1 (6.7)	45.9 (7.7)	48.7 (9.3)	53.0 (11.7)	56.6 (13.7)	59.1 (15.1)	59.9 (15.5)	57.8 (14.3)	52.0 (11.1)	46.3 (7.9)	42.7 (5.9)	50.8 (10.4)
Mean daily minimum °F (°C)	37.5 (3.1)	36.9 (2.7)	38.5 (3.6)	41.2 (5.1)	45.9 (7.7)	49.7 (9.8)	52.2 (11.2)	52.4 (11.3)	48.9 (9.4)	43.9 (6.6)	40.0 (4.4)	37.1 (2.8)	43.7 (6.5)
Average precipitation inches (mm)	11.46 (291)	7.24 (184)	8.41 (214)	5.99 (152)	3.25 (83)	2.30 (58)	1.05 (27)	1.68 (43)	2.94 (75)	7.95 (202)	11.72 (298)	11.22 (285)	75.21 (1,912)
Average snowfall inches (cm)	0.0 (0.0)	0.0 (0.0)	0.0 (0.0)	0.0 (0.0)	0.0 (0.0)	0.0 (0.0)	0.0 (0.0)	0.0 (0.0)	0.0 (0.0)	0.0 (0.0)	0.0 (0.0)	0.0 (0.0)	0 (0)
Source: NOAA

== Demographics ==
Historical population
Census	Pop.	Note	%±
2000	1,002		—
2010	953		−4.9%
2020	847		−11.1%
U.S. Decennial Census; 1990 2000 2010

Grayland first appeared as a census designated place in the 2000 U.S. census.

=== Racial and ethnic composition ===
Grayland CDP, Washington – Racial and ethnic composition Note: the US Census treats Hispanic/Latino as an ethnic category. This table excludes Latinos from the racial categories and assigns them to a separate category. Hispanics/Latinos may be of any race.
Race / Ethnicity (NH = Non-Hispanic)	Pop 2000	Pop 2010	Pop 2020	% 2000	% 2010	% 2020
White alone (NH)	938	848	719	93.61%	88.98%	84.89%
Black or African American alone (NH)	4	3	5	0.40%	0.31%	0.59%
Native American or Alaska Native alone (NH)	9	26	11	0.90%	2.73%	1.30%
Asian alone (NH)	5	11	6	0.50%	1.15%	0.71%
Native Hawaiian or Pacific Islander alone (NH)	0	0	0	0.00%	0.00%	0.00%
Other race alone (NH)	3	3	0	0.30%	0.31%	0.00%
Mixed race or Multiracial (NH)	14	22	68	1.40%	2.31%	8.03%
Hispanic or Latino (any race)	29	40	38	2.89%	4.20%	4.49%
Total	1,002	953	847	100.00%	100.00%	100.00%

=== 2000 census ===
As of the census of 2000, there were 1,002 people, 502 households, and 275 families residing in the CDP. The population density was 146.6 people per square mile (56.6/km^{2}). There were 902 housing units at an average density of 132.0/sq mi (51.0/km^{2}). The racial makeup of the CDP was 95.11% White, 0.40% African American, 0.90% Native American, 0.50% Asian, 1.70% from other races, and 1.40% from two or more races. Hispanic or Latino of any race were 2.89% of the population. 17.9% were of English, 14.6% German, 8.6% Swedish, 7.5% Norwegian, 7.2% French, 5.5% Scotch-Irish and 5.2% American ancestry according to Census 2000.

There were 502 households, out of which 16.1% had children under the age of 18 living with them, 43.2% were married couples living together, 6.8% had a female householder with no husband present, and 45.2% were non-families. 35.1% of all households were made up of individuals, and 15.3% had someone living alone who was 65 years of age or older. The average household size was 2.00 and the average family size was 2.54.

In the CDP, the population was spread out, with 15.5% under the age of 18, 4.5% from 18 to 24, 22.6% from 25 to 44, 31.5% from 45 to 64, and 25.9% who were 65 years of age or older. The median age was 50 years. For every 100 females, there were 102.0 males. For every 100 females age 18 and over, there were 101.2 males.

The median income for a household in the CDP was $25,776, and the median income for a family was $36,979. Males had a median income of $35,833 versus $36,161 for females. The per capita income for the CDP was $21,723. About 9.9% of families and 19.3% of the population were below the poverty line, including 49.6% of those under age 18 and 15.2% of those age 65 or over.

== Transportation ==
The nearest major highway is U.S. Route 101, which is accessed using State Route 105.

== Communications ==
Grayland is a popular destination for DX-peditions, which can locate and receive radio station signals from nations across the Pacific Ocean.

== Education ==
The community is served by the Ocosta School District.

== Notable natives ==
- Colin Cowherd, host of Fox Sports 1's The Herd
- Bill Ransom, author and academic
