= Markham, Washington =

- CDP
- Location of Markham, Washington
- Coordinates: 46°54′32″N 123°59′27″W
- Country: United States
- State: Washington
- County: Grays Harbor

Area
  - Total: 1.1 sq mi (2.9 km^{2})
  - Land: 1.1 sq mi (2.9 km^{2})
  - Water: 0 sq mi (0.0 km^{2})
- Elevation: 72 ft (22 m)

Population (2020)
  - Total: 119
  - Density: 110/sq mi (41/km^{2})
- Time zone: UTC-8 (Pacific (PST))
  - Summer (DST): UTC-7 (PDT)
- ZIP Code: 98520
- Area code(s): 360, 564
- FIPS code: 53-43640
- GNIS feature ID: 2408183

Markham is a census-designated place (CDP) in Grays Harbor County, Washington, United States. The population was 119 at the 2020 census.

== Geography ==
According to the United States Census Bureau, the CDP has a total area of 1.1 square miles (2.9 km^{2}), all of it land.

== Demographics ==
Historical population
Census	Pop.	Note	%±
2000	95		—
2010	111		16.8%
2020	119		7.2%
U.S. Decennial Census; 1990 2000 2010

Markham first appeared as a census designated place in the 2000 U.S. census.

=== Racial and ethnic composition ===
Markham CDP, Washington – Racial and ethnic composition Note: the US Census treats Hispanic/Latino as an ethnic category. This table excludes Latinos from the racial categories and assigns them to a separate category. Hispanics/Latinos may be of any race.
Race / Ethnicity (NH = Non-Hispanic)	Pop 2000	Pop 2010	Pop 2020	% 2000	% 2010	% 2020
White alone (NH)	89	107	100	93.68%	96.40%	84.03%
Black or African American alone (NH)	0	0	1	0.00%	0.00%	0.84%
Native American or Alaska Native alone (NH)	1	1	3	1.05%	0.90%	2.52%
Asian alone (NH)	2	1	0	2.11%	0.90%	0.00%
Native Hawaiian or Pacific Islander alone (NH)	0	0	0	0.00%	0.00%	0.00%
Other race alone (NH)	0	0	3	0.00%	0.00%	2.52%
Mixed race or Multiracial (NH)	1	0	9	1.05%	0.00%	7.56%
Hispanic or Latino (any race)	2	2	3	2.11%	1.80%	2.52%
Total	95	111	119	100.00%	100.00%	100.00%

=== 2000 census ===
As of the census of 2000, there were 95 people, 41 households, and 30 families residing in the CDP. The population density was 84.6 people per square mile (32.7/km^{2}). There were 51 housing units at an average density of 45.4/sq mi (17.6/km^{2}). The racial makeup of the CDP was 94.74% White, 1.05% Native American, 2.11% Asian, 1.05% from other races, and 1.05% from two or more races. Hispanic or Latino of any race were 2.11% of the population.

There were 41 households, out of which 17.1% had children under the age of 18 living with them, 65.9% were married couples living together, 4.9% had a female householder with no husband present, and 26.8% were non-families. 19.5% of all households were made up of individuals, and 2.4% had someone living alone who was 65 years of age or older. The average household size was 2.32 and the average family size was 2.67.

In the CDP, the population was spread out, with 12.6% under the age of 18, 6.3% from 18 to 24, 22.1% from 25 to 44, 47.4% from 45 to 64, and 11.6% who were 65 years of age or older. The median age was 48 years. For every 100 females, there were 115.9 males. For every 100 females age 18 and over, there were 107.5 males.

The median income for a household in the CDP was $63,750, and the median income for a family was $96,816. Males had a median income of $40,625 versus $23,750 for females. The per capita income for the CDP was $23,700. There were no families and 12.3% of the population living below the poverty line, including no under eighteens and 100.0% of those over 64.

== Education ==
The community is served by the Ocosta School District.
