= Ocosta School District =

School district in Washington, United States

Coordinates: 46.86217°N 124.09981°W

Ocosta School District No. 172 is a rural school district in Grays Harbor County, Washington and neighboring Pacific County. The school district serves Westport, Cohassett Beach, Grayland, Markham and Tokeland.

During the 2014–15 school year, the school district enrolled 626 total students.

== Schools ==
The school district's two schools are located on a shared campus in Cohassett Beach, south of Westport.

=== Ocosta Junior Senior High School ===
The combined junior senior high school was opened in the 1980s after separating from the elementary school.

=== Ocosta Elementary School ===
The elementary school opened in 1967 and was expanded in the 1980s and 2016. The 2016 expansion included the construction of a vertical tsunami refuge atop a gymnasium, the first such facility built in the United States.
