= Westport, Washington =

- City
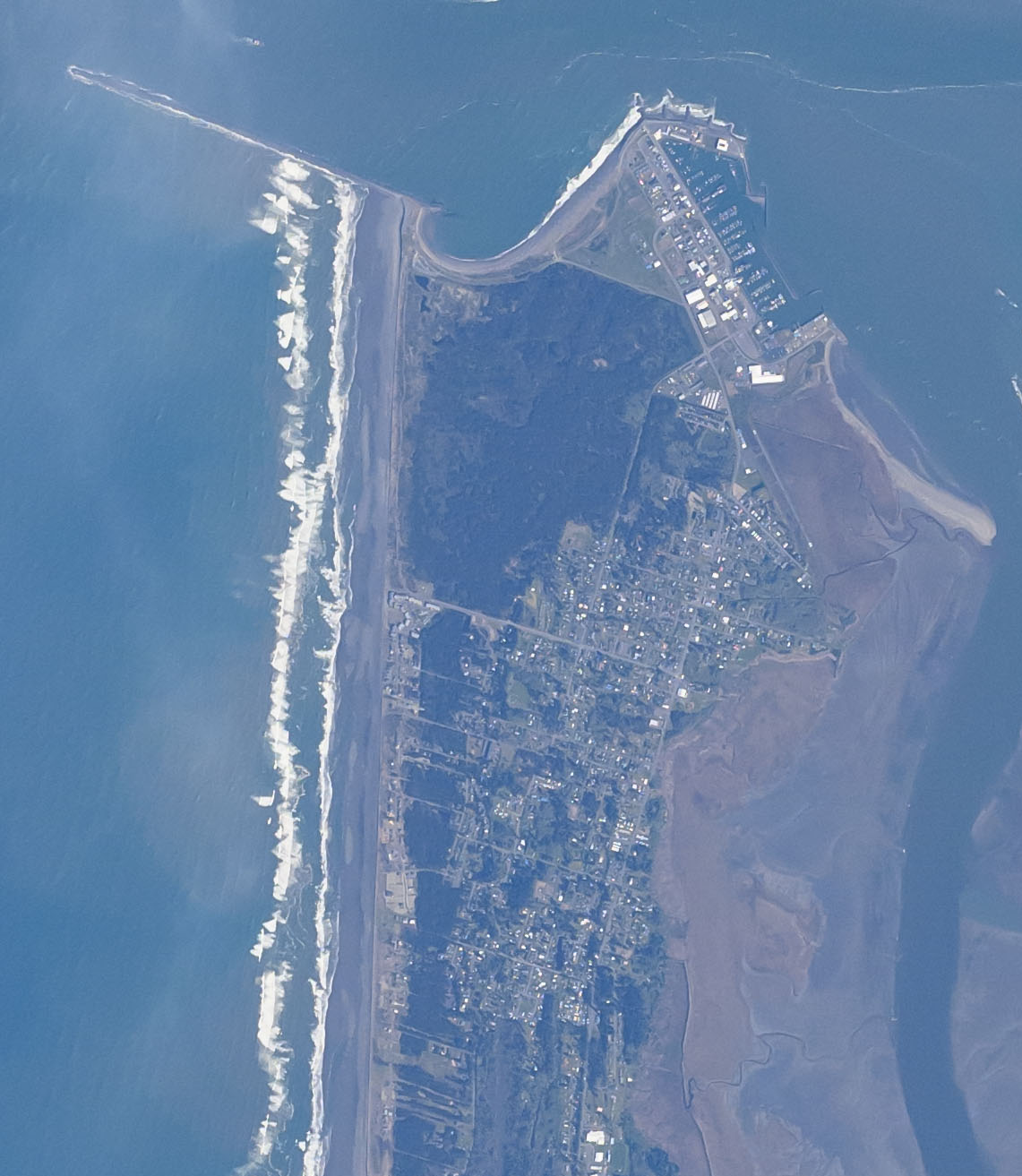
- View from Expedition 71, April 2024

- Location of Westport, Washington
- Coordinates: 46°53′38″N 124°07′02″W
- Country: United States
- State: Washington
- County: Grays Harbor
- Founded: 1857
- Incorporated: June 26, 1914

Government
  - Type: Mayor–council
  - Mayor: Ed Welter

Area
  - Total: 5.94 sq mi (15.38 km^{2})
  - Land: 3.69 sq mi (9.56 km^{2})
  - Water: 2.25 sq mi (5.83 km^{2})
- Elevation: 13 ft (4.0 m)

Population (2020)
  - Total: 2,213
  - Density: 569.2/sq mi (219.76/km^{2})
- Demonym: Westportarican
- Time zone: UTC-8 (Pacific (PST))
  - Summer (DST): UTC-7 (PDT)
- ZIP Code: 98595
- Area code(s): 360, 564
- FIPS code: 53-77630
- GNIS feature ID: 2412243
- Website: ci.westport.wa.us

Westport is a city in Grays Harbor County, Washington, United States. It had a population of 2,213 at the 2020 census. Westport is located on the Point Chehalis Peninsula, right on the entrance to Grays Harbor from the Pacific Ocean.

The public Westport Marina is the largest marina on the outer coast of the United States's Pacific Northwest. The marina is home to a large commercial fishing fleet and several recreational charter fishing vessels. A summer-only passenger ferry, discontinued in 2008, previously connected the town to Ocean Shores, across the mouth of the harbor to the north. It is home to the Washington Tuna Classic, which happens each August.

== History ==
Westport was officially incorporated on June 26, 1914. Names for the area in the past include Peterson's Point, Chehalis City, and Fort Chehalis. The latter name is for a U.S. Army fort established in 1860 before the town was founded, "ts-a-lis" is the Lower Chehalis word for Westport, meaning "place of sand". Early explorers pronounced the word "Chehalis" and gave this name to the river and the people living up river who later became the Chehalis people or "People of the Sands". The area was used regularly during the summer by local Native American tribes (most likely the Shoalwater Bay Tribe, comprising Willapa Chinook and Lower Chehalis people) before Thomas Barker Speake and his family arrived early in the summer of 1857. Westport is also the home to a station for the US Coast Guard.

=== Tsunami shelters ===
In 2016, the Ocosta School District became the first in North America to build a publicly funded vertical tsunami shelter, located at Ocosta Elementary School. Measuring 53 feet (16.2 m), the structure is joined with the school, can hold 1,000 people, and is built to withstand a Cascadia subduction zone earthquake. The $13.8 million project was funded by a local bond.

A $15.2 million grant, with a 10% match by Westport, was awarded from the Federal Emergency Management Agency (FEMA) to the city in 2023 for the construction of a community tsunami evacuation tower that is scheduled to be ready in 2026. Capable of also holding 1,000 people, the tower is planned to be part of a larger park complex near the town's marina and will stand around 50 feet (15.2 m) tall. With plans to add an additional three towers in the future, Westport also received a $2.0 million grant to complete a communications network that would continue to operate during a catastrophic event.

== Geography ==
According to the United States Census Bureau, the city has a total area of 4.50 square miles (11.65 km^{2}), of which, 3.70 square miles (9.58 km^{2}) is land and 0.80 square miles (2.07 km^{2}) is water.

A weather station in Grayland, a community just south of Westport, has recorded conditions in the area going back to 1948. The area is generally mild and wet, with November through January having especially high levels of rainfall (averaging over 10 inches or 250 millimetres for each of those months) and little or no snow. (See Grayland, Washington for climate data.)

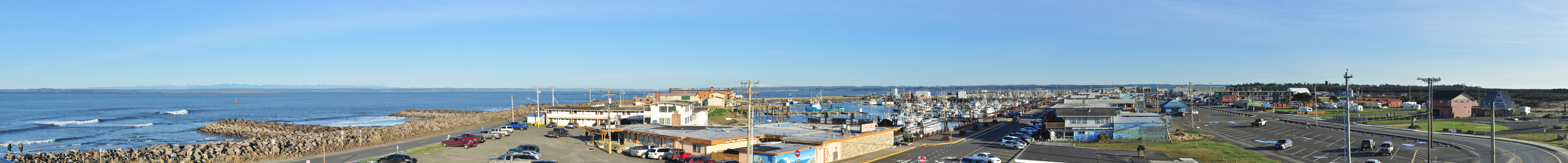
The marina district and downtown Westport, viewed from the observation tower, 2015

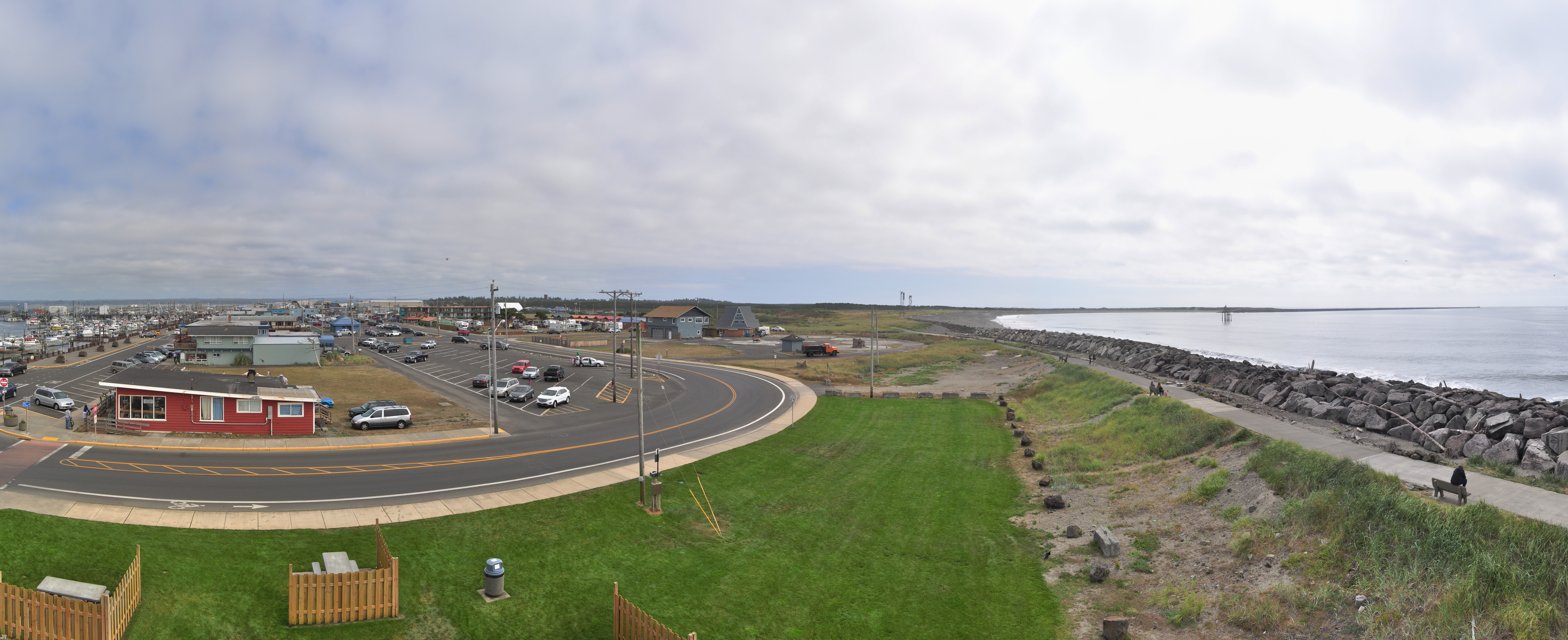
Panorama of Westport looking toward the south beach, south jetty and the state park, 2016

== Demographics ==
Historical population
Census	Pop.	Note	%±
1920	114		—
1930	272		138.6%
1940	443		62.9%
1950	731		65.0%
1960	976		33.5%
1970	1,364		39.8%
1980	1,954		43.3%
1990	1,892		−3.2%
2000	2,137		12.9%
2010	2,099		−1.8%
2020	2,213		5.4%
U.S. Decennial Census; 2020 Census

=== 2020 census ===
As of the 2020 census, Westport had a population of 2,213. The median age was 47.5 years. 16.1% of residents were under the age of 18 and 26.1% of residents were 65 years of age or older. For every 100 females there were 101.5 males, and for every 100 females age 18 and over there were 98.0 males age 18 and over.

0.0% of residents lived in urban areas, while 100.0% lived in rural areas.

There were 1,034 households in Westport, of which 19.3% had children under the age of 18 living in them. Of all households, 37.4% were married-couple households, 23.2% were households with a male householder and no spouse or partner present, and 30.7% were households with a female householder and no spouse or partner present. About 38.2% of all households were made up of individuals and 18.9% had someone living alone who was 65 years of age or older.

There were 1,486 housing units, of which 30.4% were vacant. The homeowner vacancy rate was 1.7% and the rental vacancy rate was 12.8%.

Racial composition as of the 2020 census
Race	Number	Percent
White	1,886	85.2%
Black or African American	9	0.4%
American Indian and Alaska Native	36	1.6%
Asian	19	0.9%
Native Hawaiian and Other Pacific Islander	0	0.0%
Some other race	40	1.8%
Two or more races	223	10.1%
Hispanic or Latino (of any race)	155	7.0%

=== 2010 census ===
At the 2010 census there were 2,099 people, 999 households, and 527 families living in the city. The population density was 567.3 inhabitants per square mile (219.0/km^{2}). There were 1,561 housing units at an average density of 421.9 per square mile (162.9/km^{2}). The racial makeup of the city was 87.0% White, 0.9% African American, 2.9% Native American, 1.1% Asian, 4.5% from other races, and 3.6% from two or more races. Hispanic or Latino of any race were 7.3%.

Of the 999 households 21.6% had children under the age of 18 living with them, 37.4% were married couples living together, 9.9% had a female householder with no husband present, 5.4% had a male householder with no wife present, and 47.2% were non-families. 38.2% of households were one person and 16.2% were one person aged 65 or older. The average household size was 2.10 and the average family size was 2.72.

The median age was 48.4 years. 18.8% of residents were under the age of 18; 7.2% were between the ages of 18 and 24; 19.8% were from 25 to 44; 32.9% were from 45 to 64; and 21.3% were 65 or older. The gender makeup of the city was 50.7% male and 49.3% female.

=== 2000 census ===
At the 2000 census, there were 2,137 people, 983 households, and 547 families living in the city. The population density was 592.9 people per square mile (229.2/km^{2}). There were 1,358 housing units at an average density of 376.8 per square mile (145.6/km^{2}). The racial makeup of the city was 92.75% White, 0.33% African American, 3.09% Native American, 0.94% Asian, 0.05% Pacific Islander, 0.47% from other races, and 2.39% from two or more races. Hispanic or Latino of any race were 2.99% of the population. 21.7% were of German, 10.9% English, 9.6% Irish, 7.6% Norwegian, 5.3% American and 5.1% Swedish ancestry.

Of the 983 households 23.2% had children under the age of 18 living with them, 42.9% were married couples living together, 8.7% had a female householder with no husband present, and 44.3% were non-families. 34.8% of households were one person and 14.8% were one person aged 65 or older. The average household size was 2.16 and the average family size was 2.79.

The age distribution was 22.0% under the age of 18, 6.7% from 18 to 24, 24.8% from 25 to 44, 27.3% from 45 to 64, and 19.1% 65 or older. The median age was 43 years. For every 100 females, there were 98.1 males. For every 100 females age 18 and over, there were 91.9 males.

The median household income was $32,037 and the median family income was $40,037. Males had a median income of $33,173 versus $23,889 for females. The per capita income for the city was $17,362. About 9.0% of families and 14.3% of the population were below the poverty line, including 23.4% of those under age 18 and 4.6% of those age 65 or over.

== Arts and culture ==
=== Events ===
The Westport Blessing of the Fleet is an annual event held since 1961 that celebrates the community's maritime heritage and traditions.

The city hosts the Westport Longboard Classic, a surfing event where surfers gather to compete in early September. The longstanding annual competition had been cancelled by the mid-2000s for unknown reasons and restarted in 2024.

=== Historic buildings and sites ===
The Westport Fishermen’s Monument is located on Neddie Road Drive and is a memorial to those "lost at sea". The public monument was commissioned in 1959 and was the site of the city's first Blessing of the Fleet in 1961.

== Economy ==
The Westport Marina is annually ranked as one of the top commercial ports for fishing in the United States. Westport once was home to a thriving logging community but cranberry farming has been a long-term, dependable component of the area's economy. Due in part to the COVID-19 pandemic, the city has created more business opportunities for tourism, including surfing and a focus on the local availability of seafood.

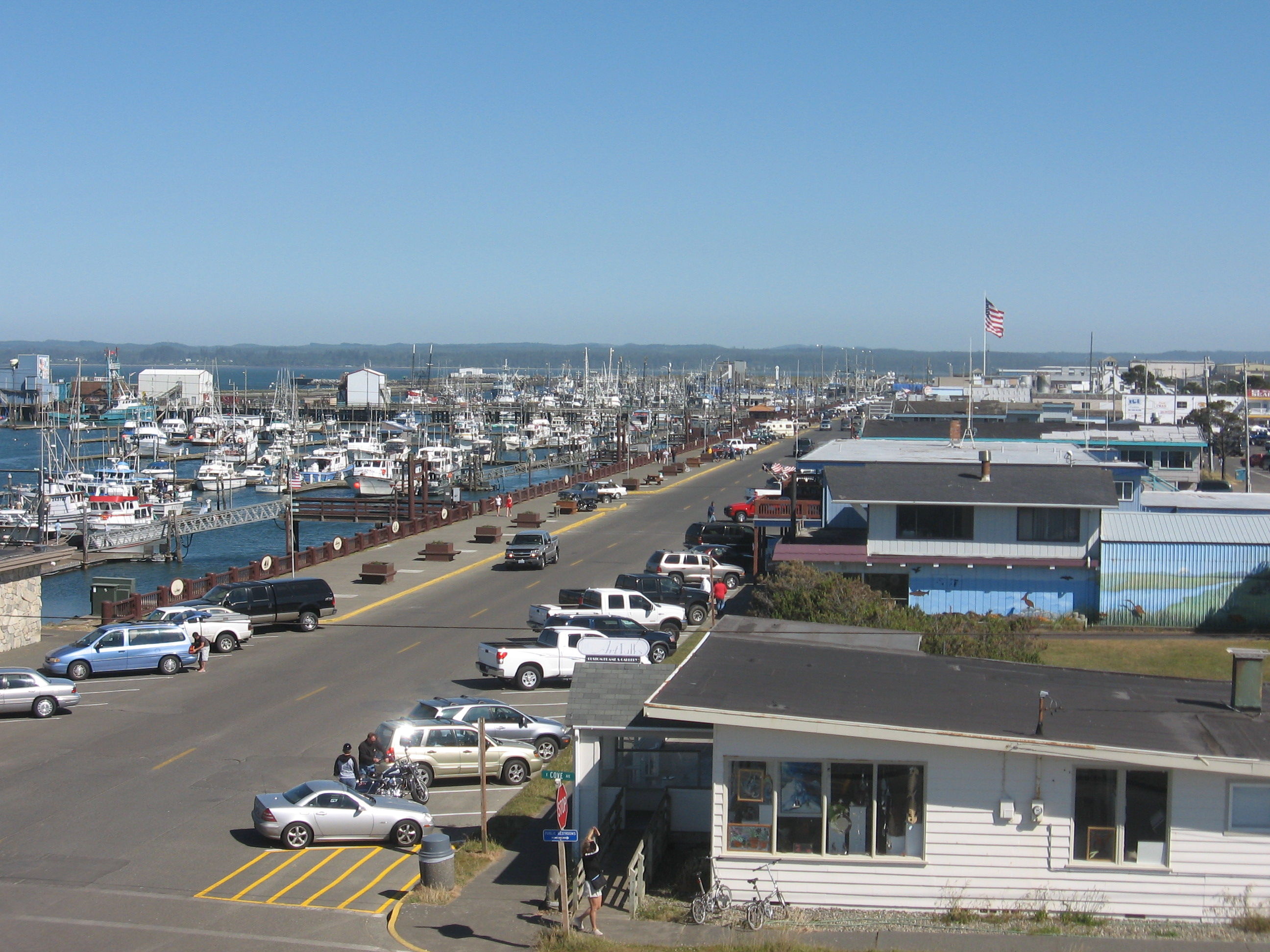
Marina District, looking east from the Westport Viewing Tower, 2008

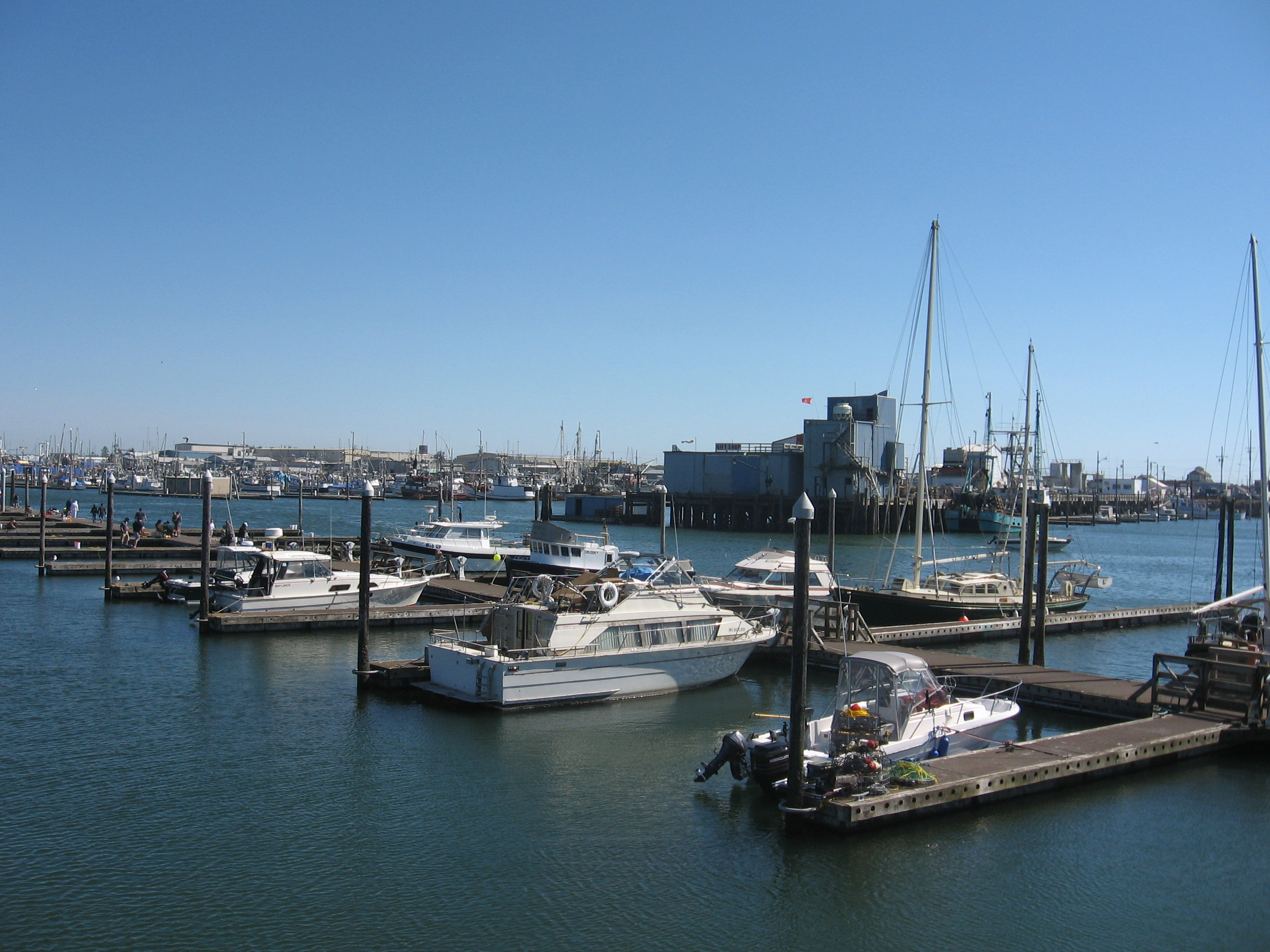
Westport Marina, 2008

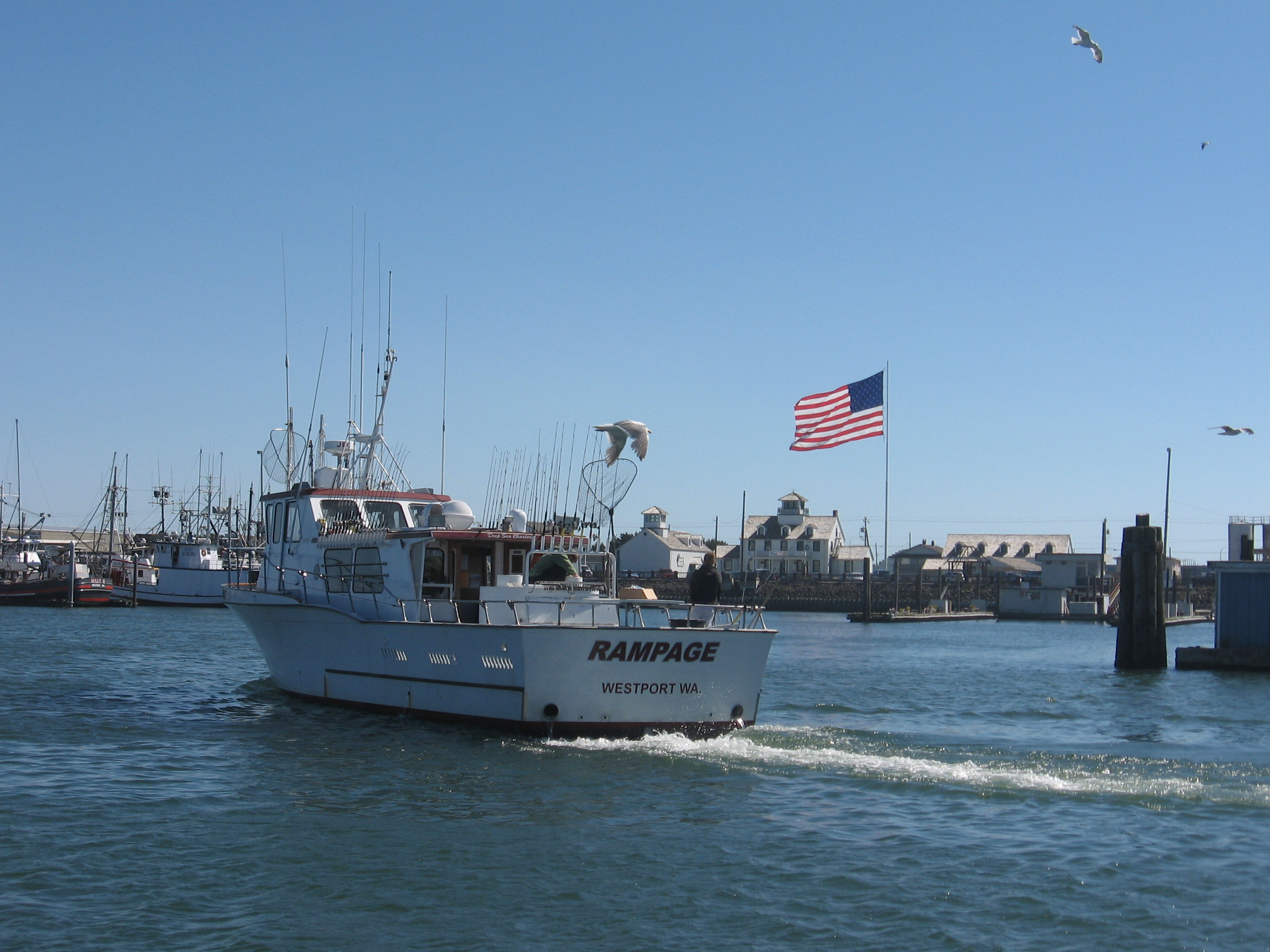
A typical fishing boat returning to Westport Marina, 2008

== Education ==
Primary and secondary education in Westport is provided by the Ocosta School District.

== See also ==
- Westport Light State Park
- Westport Airport (Washington)
- Ocean Shores, Washington
