= National Register of Historic Places listings in Pacific County, Washington =

Location of Pacific County in Washington

This list presents the full set of buildings, structures, objects, sites, or districts designated on the National Register of Historic Places in Pacific County, Washington, and offers brief descriptive information about each of them. The National Register recognizes places of national, state, or local historic significance across the United States. Out of over 90,000 National Register sites nationwide, Washington is home to approximately 1,500, and 20 of those are found in Pacific County.

This National Park Service list is complete through NPS recent listings posted May 1, 2026.

== Current listings ==
	Name on the Register	Image	Date listed	Location	City or town	Description
1	Cape Disappointment Historic District	Cape Disappointment Historic District	August 15, 1975 (#75001864)	From .5 mi (0.80 km). S of Ilwaco to WA/OR boundary 46°17′01″N 124°03′37″W	Ilwaco	
2	Chinook Point	Chinook Point	October 15, 1966 (#66000747)	5 mi (8.0 km). SE of Fort Columbia Historical State Park on U.S. 101; 46°15′25″N 123°54′57″W	Chinook	
3	Colbert House	Colbert House	October 18, 1977 (#77001347)	Quaker and Lake Sts. 46°18′31″N 124°02′06″W	Ilwaco	
4	Columbia River Quarantine Station	Columbia River Quarantine Station	February 8, 1980 (#80004007)	SW of Knappton on WA 401; 46°16′15″N 123°49′47″W	Knappton	
5	Fort Columbia	Fort Columbia	July 7, 2025 (#100011981)	US HWY 101, Approx 2.3 miles (3.7 km) west of Astoria - Megler Bridge (Fort Columbia State Park); 46°15′36″N 123°55′08″W	Chinook vicinity	
6	Klipsan Beach Life Saving Station	Klipsan Beach Life Saving Station	July 5, 1979 (#79002546)	WA 103; 46°27′53″N 124°03′09″W	Klipsan Beach	
7	Lumber Exchange Building	Lumber Exchange Building	May 19, 1988 (#88000604)	Robert Bush Dr./US 101 and Willapa Ave. 46°39′58″N 123°48′42″W	South Bend	Demolished
8	Oysterville Historic District	Oysterville Historic District	April 21, 1976 (#76001898)	WA 103; 46°32′46″N 124°01′44″W	Oysterville	
9	Pacific County Courthouse	Pacific County Courthouse	July 20, 1977 (#77001348)	Cowlitz and Vine Sts. 46°39′46″N 123°48′33″W	South Bend	
10	Raymond Public Library	Raymond Public Library	November 29, 1979 (#79002548)	507 Duryea St. 46°41′12″N 123°43′50″W	Raymond	
11	Raymond Theater	Raymond Theater	May 1, 1991 (#91000540)	325 N. Third St. 46°41′10″N 123°44′00″W	Raymond	
12	Russell House	Russell House	November 25, 1977 (#77001349)	902 E. Water St. 46°39′46″N 123°46′59″W	South Bend	
13	Peter Schulderman House	Peter Schulderman House	May 19, 1988 (#88000597)	37th St. and K Pl. 46°19′45″N 124°03′25″W	Seaview	
14	Shelburne Hotel	Shelburne Hotel	December 15, 1978 (#78002765)	WA 103 and K St. 46°20′06″N 124°03′14″W	Seaview	
15	Shogren Cottage	Shogren Cottage	April 8, 2019 (#100002409)	22107 Pacific Way; 46°27′45″N 124°03′12″W	Ocean Park	
16	South Bend Carnegie Public Library	South Bend Carnegie Public Library	August 3, 1982 (#82004269)	W. 1st and Pacific Sts. 46°39′59″N 123°48′51″W	South Bend	Carnegie Libraries of Washington TR
17	Tokeland Hotel	Tokeland Hotel	April 11, 1978 (#78002766)	Kindred Ave. and Hotel Rd. 46°42′31″N 123°59′00″W	Tokeland	
18	U.S. Post Office – Raymond Main	U.S. Post Office – Raymond Main	May 30, 1991 (#91000654)	406 Duryea St. 46°41′11″N 123°43′55″W	Raymond	
19	Willapa Bay Boathouse	Willapa Bay Boathouse	March 13, 1986 (#86000358)	US Coast Guard Station, Willapa Bay; 46°42′21″N 123°58′01″W	Tokeland	
20	The Wreckage	The Wreckage	September 18, 1979 (#79002547)	256th Pl. 46°29′15″N 124°03′03″W	Ocean Park	Log house

== See also ==
- National Register of Historic Places listings in Washington state
- Listings in neighboring counties: Clatsop, Grays Harbor, Lewis, Wahkiakum
- Historic preservation
- History of Washington (state)
- Index of Washington (state)-related articles
