= Wreckage =

Wreckage may refer to:

- Debris

== Music ==
- Wreckage (album), a 2002 album by Overseer
- Wreckage (1969 band), a late 1960s band notable for featuring future Queen vocalist Freddie Mercury as a member
- Wreckage, a 1997 EP by the band Entombed
- "Wreckage" (Nate Smith song), 2022
- "Wreckage" (Pearl Jam song), 2024
- "Wreckage", a song by Combichrist from Everybody Hates You
- "Wreckage", a song by the J. Geils Band from Monkey Island
- "Wreckage", a song by Parkway Drive from Deep Blue

== Other uses ==
- Wreckage (G.I. Joe), a character in the G.I. Joe universe
- "Wreckage" (Chancer), a 1990 television episode

== See also ==
- Wreck (disambiguation)
- The Wreckage (disambiguation)
