= Wrecked =

Wrecked may refer to:

== Films ==
- Wrecked (film), a 2011 thriller directed by Michael Greenspan
- Scenic Route (film) or Wrecked, a 2013 psychological thriller directed by Kevin and Michael Goetz

== TV ==
- "Wrecked" (Buffy the Vampire Slayer), a 2001 television episode
- Wrecked (American TV series), a 2016 American comedy television series on TBS
- Wrecked: Life in the Crash Lane, a Speed Channel reality series

== Music ==
=== Albums ===
- Wrecked (album), a 1996 album released by Raymond Watts.

=== Songs ===
- "Wrecked" (song), a song by Imagine Dragons from their 2021 album, Mercury – Act 1

== Others ==
- Wrecked: Revenge Revisited, a video game

== See also ==
- Wreck (disambiguation)
- Wrecker (disambiguation)
- Wrecks, one-man play
