= Reck =

Reck or Rek is a surname of German origin.

== People with the surname ==
- Friedrich Reck (1884–1945), German author and opponent of Nazism
- John Reck (1865–1951), American politician
- Hans Reck (1886–1937), German volcanologist and paleontologist
- Paulette Reck (born c. 1948), American model
- Stefan Reck (born 1954), German television actor
- Centa Rek (born 1954), Bolivian politician
- Oliver Reck (born 1965), German football goalkeeper
- Sean Reck (born 1967), English former footballer
- Christian Reck (born 1987), German politician

== See also ==
- Wreck (disambiguation)
