= Surf break =

Permanent obstruction on the seabed which causes waves to break

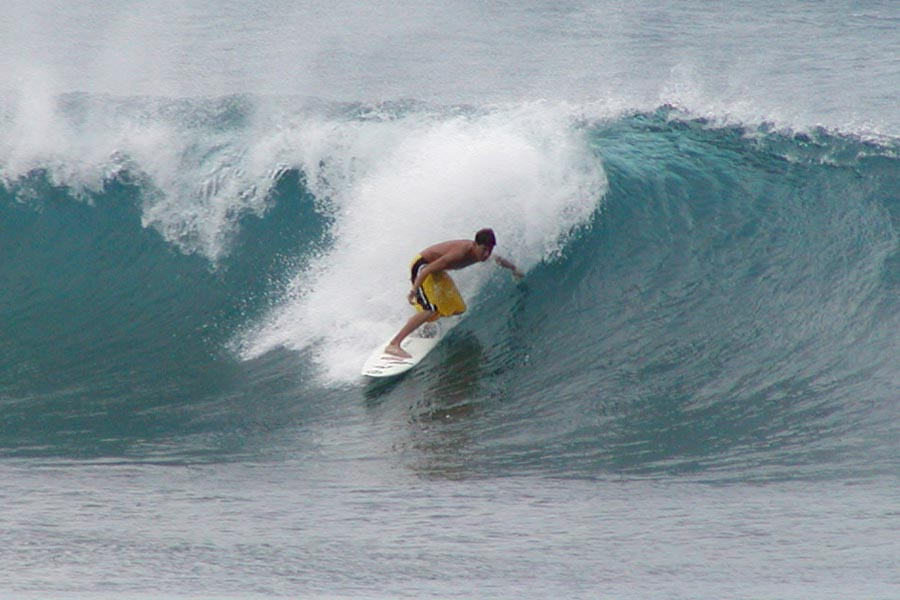
Surfing a break in Oahu

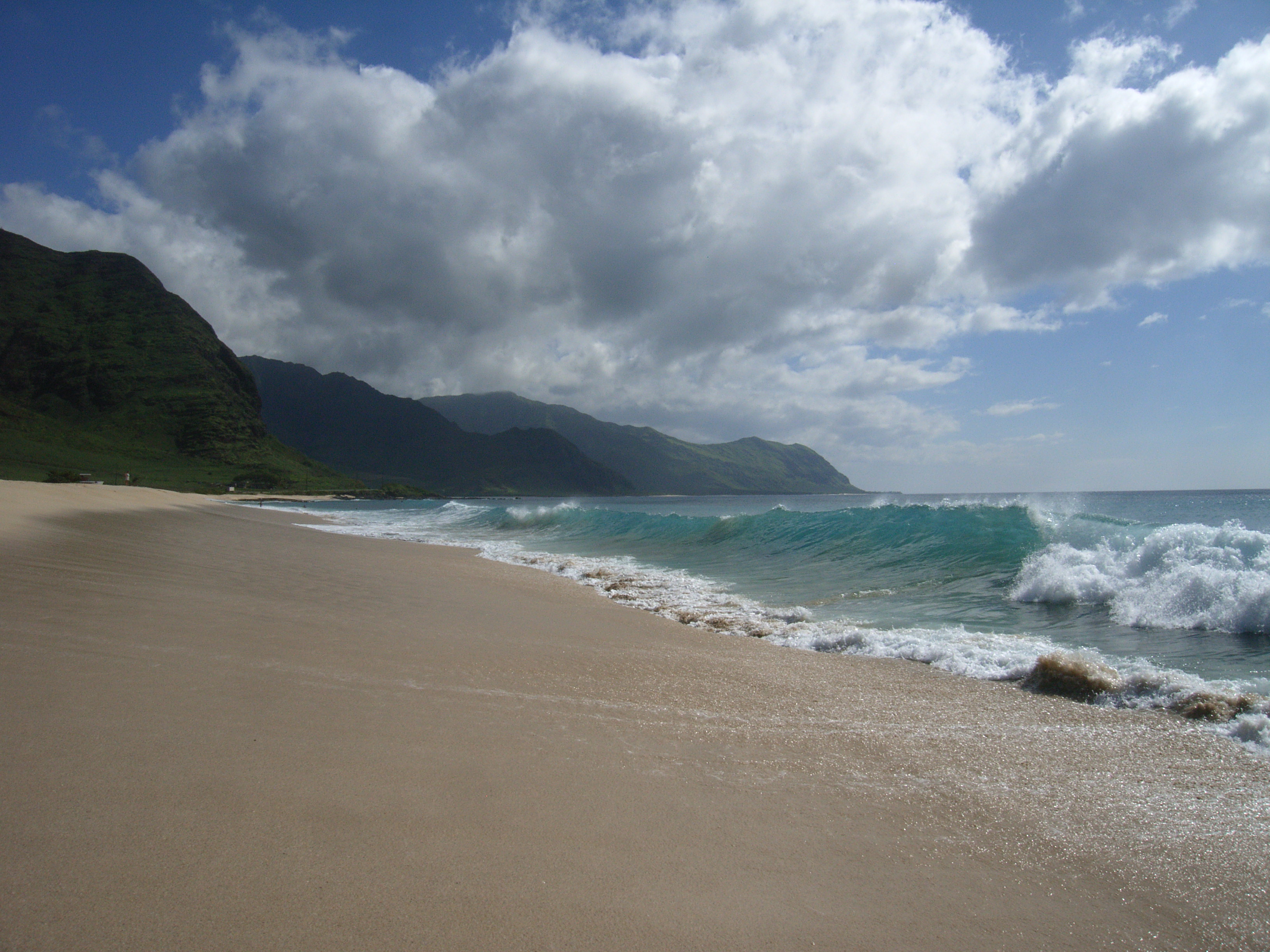
Beach Break Honolulu

A surf break (also break, shore break, or big wave break) is a permanent (or semi-permanent) obstruction such as a coral reef, rock, shoal, or headland that causes a wave to break, forming a barreling wave or other wave that can be surfed, before it eventually collapses. The topography of the seabed determines the shape of the wave and type of break. Since shoals can change size and location, affecting the break, it takes commitment and skill to find good breaks. Some surf breaks are quite dangerous, since the surfer can collide with a reef or rocks below the water.

Surf breaks may be defended vehemently by surfers, as human activities and constructions can have unintended and unpredictable consequences on the quality of the break.

== Types ==
There are numerous types of surf breaks. These are defined as permanent or semi permanent obstructions that causes a wave to break, rather than by the nature of the wave itself (see under 'Types of surfable waves' below).

Artificial wave pools are an example of technology changing what is considered a 'surf break' or 'surfable wave'.

Some 'surf break' locations may be partly or wholly formed and influenced by human activities (see under 'Human influence on surf breaks' below). These effects are variable and may be either negative or positive with respect to the effect on local surf quality.

=== Point break ===
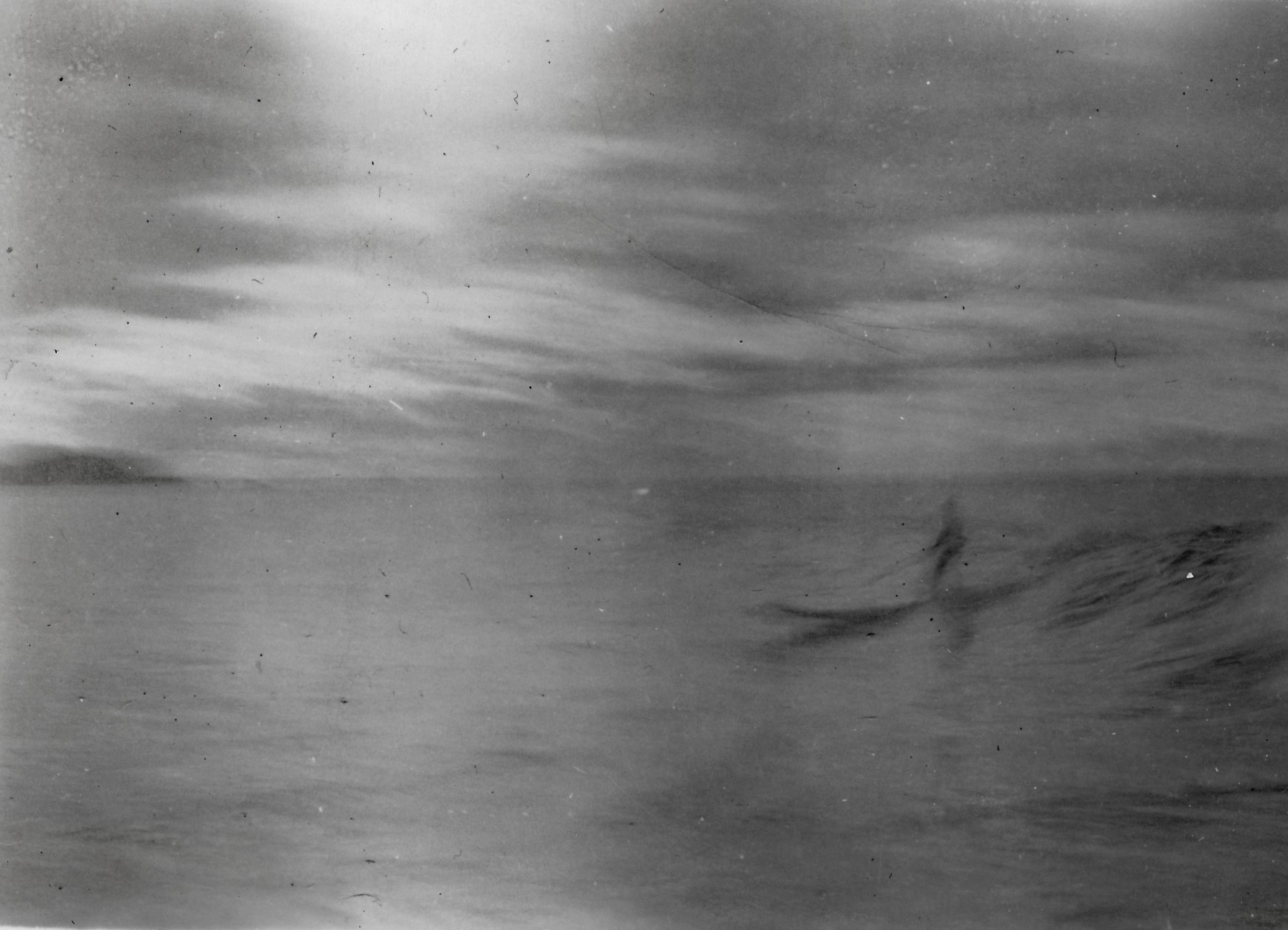
Currumbin Alley

A point break is a place where waves hit a point of land or rocks jutting out from the coastline. Bells Beach in Australia and Jardim do Mar in Madeira, Portugal are examples of point breaks.

They can break either left or right, and in rare cases forms a central peak which breaks both ways around a central headland (e.g. Punta Rocas beach in the Punta Negra District of Peru). The bottom can be made of rocks, sand, or coral.

=== Beach break ===
A beach break takes place where waves break on a usually sandy seabed. An example of a classic beach break is Hossegor in Southern France, which is famous for waves of up to 6 m (20 ft).

Sometimes 'beaches' can contain little or no sand, and the 'beach' bottom may be only rock or boulders and pebbles. A 'boulder beach' is an example.

=== Reef break ===
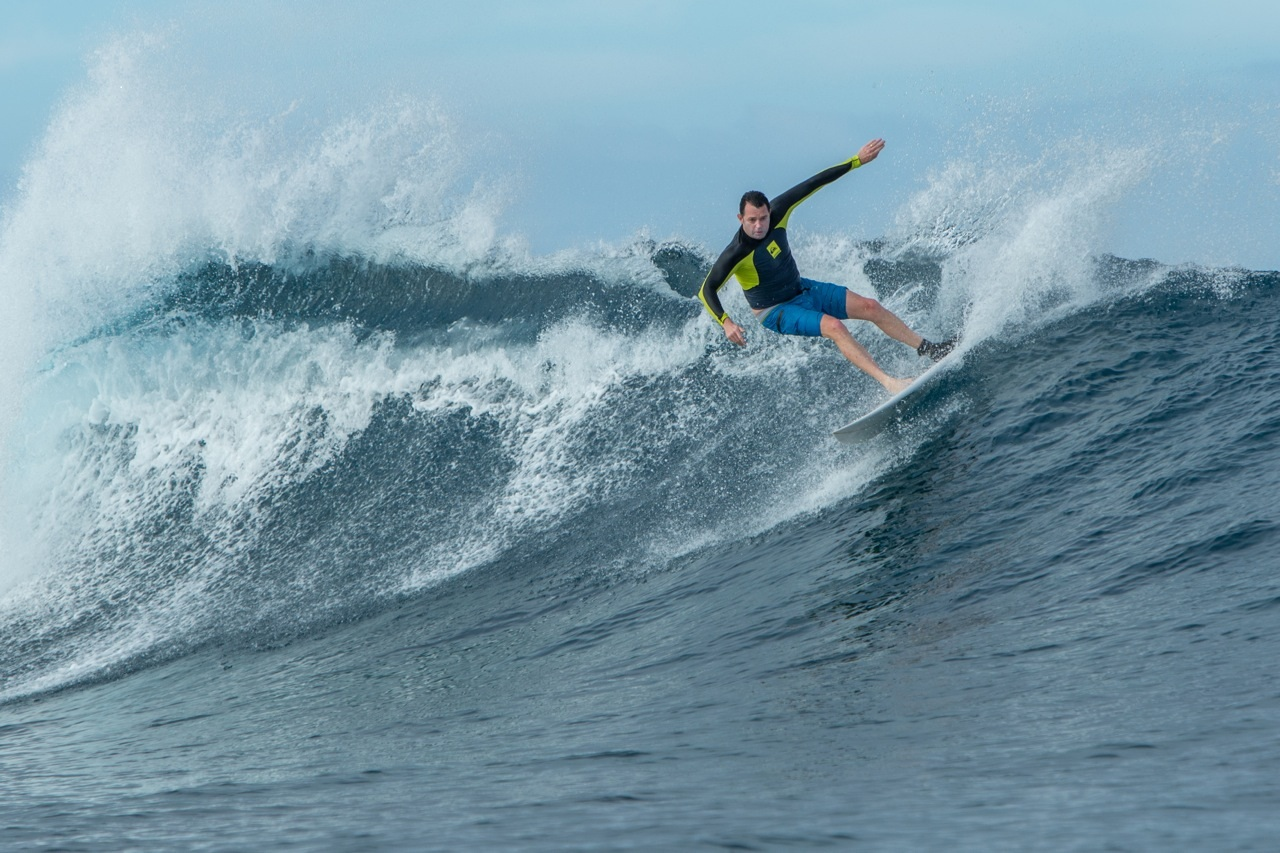
Cloudbreak

A reef break happens when a wave breaks over a coral reef or a rocky seabed. Examples are Cloudbreak in Fiji and Jaws in Maui.

A reef break may occur close to the shore, or well offshore from the shoreline, breaking in open ocean and petering out before the wave reaches the shore. Examples include Queenscliff Bommie in Australia and Dungeons in South Africa. In Australia these open ocean reefs are sometimes called Bombora or 'Bommie' waves, after the aboriginal word for offshore reef, 'bombora'. Sometimes reefs which occur in open ocean but which do not breach the surface are also called 'Banks'. The Cortes Bank off California is an example.

There are also examples of human-made reefs specifically designed and made for surfing. Some artificial harbours also create new reef break waves. Examples include Newcastle Harbour in Australia.

=== Shipwreck break ===
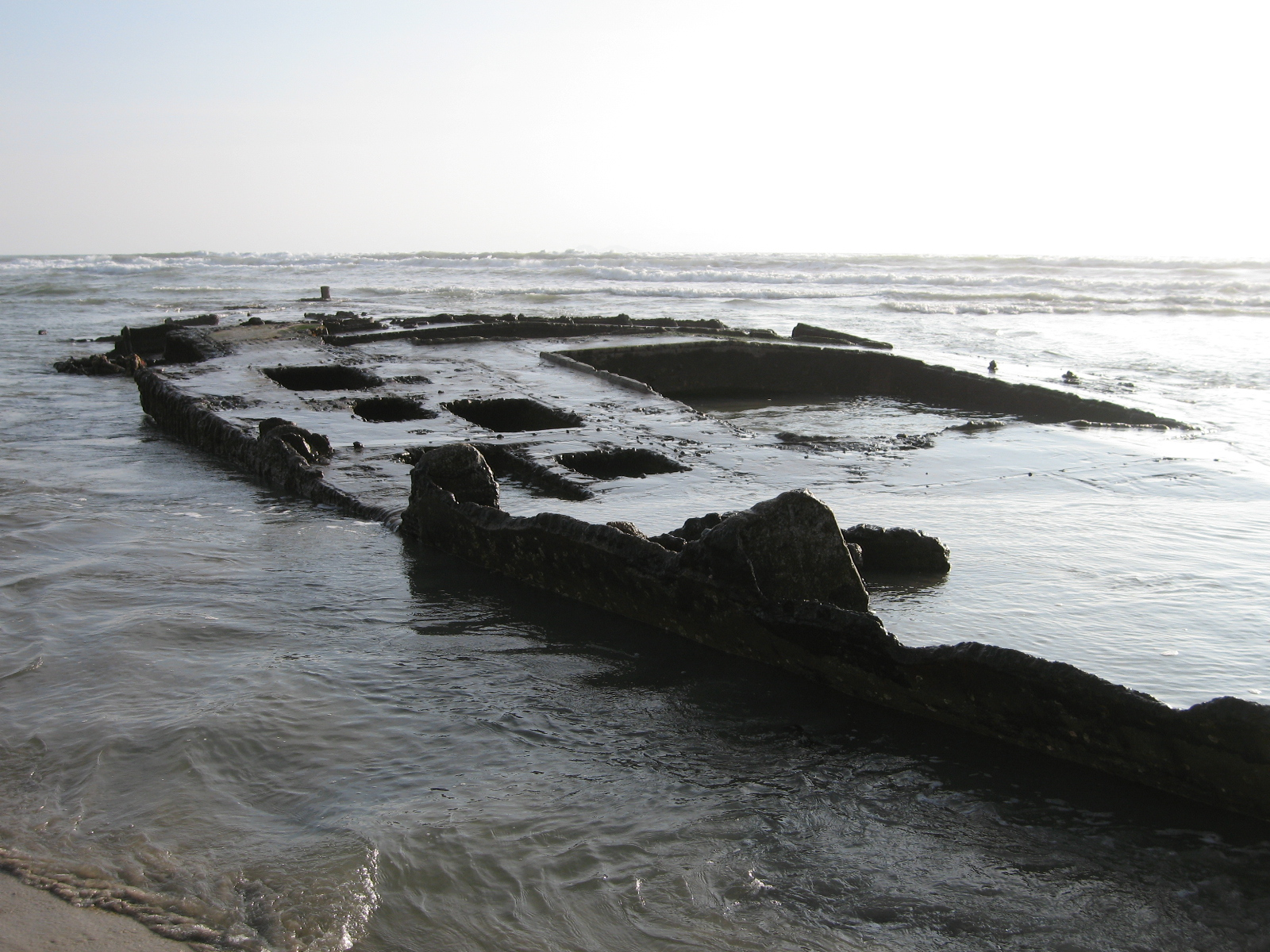
SS Monte Carlo

A "shipwreck break" usually forms from sand built up over submerged or partly submerged shipwrecks. They may be either temporary or more or less permanent, depending on whether the wreck remains in place for a significant period.

Examples occur at the SS Monte Carlo at the Silver Strand, The Wreck, Byron Bay, NSW, and at Stockton Beach, Newcastle, NSW.

=== Shore break ===
A shore break is a wave that breaks directly on, or very close to the shore. This happens when the beach is very steep at the shoreline. These waves are really just a form of beach or reef break, but breaking very close to the shore.

=== Rivermouth break ===
A rivermouth break breaks at or near the entrance to a river or creek. It can break as either a left-breaking or right-breaking wave, or a peak which breaks both ways. The bottom is usually sand, but can be pebbles, rocks, or even coral reef.

Examples include Mundaka in Spain, and Merimbula bar in Australia.

They are sometimes called 'Bar' breaks because of the way the sand piles up along the shoreline.

=== Jetty break ===
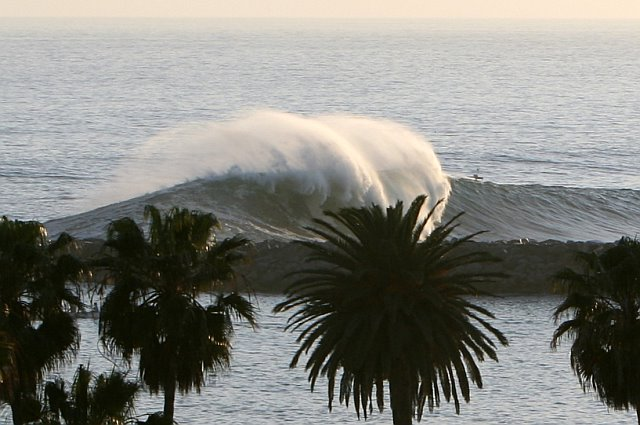
The Wedge

These waves break along or near a jetty. They are also called 'groynes' in some places. Examples include Long Beach in New York, The Wedge in California, and Duranbah Groyne in Australia.

Jetty and groyne style waves are known for often exhibiting constructive interference between different incoming waves to produce a significantly larger, 'wedging' style of wave, due to the unusual extension of obstruction that juts out significantly from the shore, and which wave shape is often favored by surfers. This is an example of a human influence which actually may improve a wave's shape and quality for surfing, however in other cases the effect for surfing may be negative.

Natural 'wedge' style constructive interference can however occur on any type of surf break, provided the local wave dynamics are favorable.

=== Outer banks ===
A type of open ocean surf break, these occur where sand build ups occur well offshore to produce breaking waves in the open ocean, which are sometimes called 'Outer Banks', which are similar to open ocean reefs except that they are generally made of sand, and may disappear or change with storms. The 'Outer Banks' in North Carolina is an example. They can also be made of more permanent rocky reefs.

=== Tidal bore breaks ===
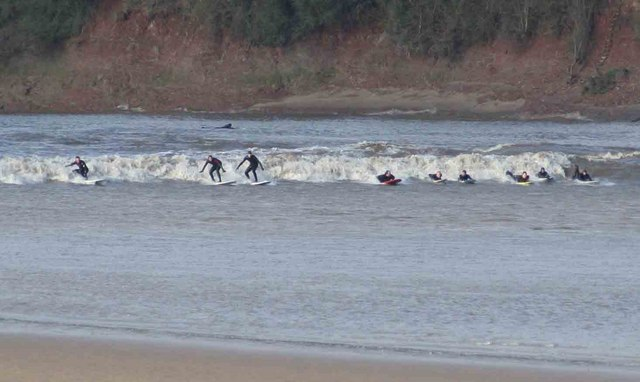
Severn Bore

Numerous tidal bore waves are known, some of which have also been surfed for several kilometres or more and many kilometres from the ocean, making them the longest rideable waves in the world.

They are formed where stronger and larger tides enter a river or deltaic system, allowing the tide to forcefully push and extend up the river, sometimes forming rideable waves. The waves can be singular or multiple crested.

They form at specific times of the day, month, and year due to tidal currents, and can be accurately predicted.

Well-known examples include several in the Amazon Basin, in Brazil, at the Severn Bore in the United Kingdom, and in Sumatra, Indonesia.

=== Standing river breaks ===
These are waves which are created in some fast flowing rivers or creeks, allowing a surfer to ride a wave for several minutes or more whilst standing or lying more or less stationary within the river. The force of the flow along an uneven river bed allows a standing wave to form, and the surfer to be able to ride the wave successfully. They are relatively rare as local wave dynamics tend to be very specific.

Examples include on the Zambesi River in Africa, on the St Lawrence River in Montreal, Canada, and on the Eisbach river in Munich, Germany.

They also sometimes form when an inland lagoon or lake breaches its entry to the sea, forming standing waves in the channel between the lagoon and sea. Examples include at Waimea in Hawaii.

=== Artificial wave pools ===
These are waves generated in an artificially created pool with a powerful wave-generating device, to form waves which can be surfed without any need for an existing, natural water environment, such as an ocean or shoreline. Wave pools can therefore be built almost anywhere, and several designs and models (which have also been patented) are in use.

In December 2015, the former world surfing champion and current professional surfer Kelly Slater revealed a new type of wave pool at an unknown location, which was able to demonstrably show well-shaped barrelling style waves over several hundred metres at around head-high or more, a quality and size not previously achieved by any wave pool. The ability to create genuine, long, barreling, surfable waves at locations far from natural shorelines may prove important in surfing culture and history.

Wave pools are currently the subject of much research and development, and there are a number of planned and existing commercial operations.

== Types of surfable waves ==
As opposed to permanent or semipermanent obstructions which cause waves to break, surfable waves are sometimes defined by the nature of their generation.

=== Swell waves ===
Ocean swells form from the longer term amalgamation of wind-generated waves on the surface. The stronger the wind and the longer the area over which it blows, generally the larger the swell.

=== Wind waves ===
If large enough, local wind-generated chop can be surfed, but usually only after it has amalgamated into genuine swell from a distance.

=== Ship waves ===
A large ship such as an oil tanker can sometimes create rideable waves at the shoreline. These are usually surfed only when the waves are otherwise very small, such as in a large inland lake.

There has been unconfirmed reports of an offshore boat being used to make waves during surf contests when the surf was otherwise very small.

=== Tsunami waves ===
Although rare, surfable tsunami waves from earthquakes have been recorded. One documented place an earthquake-generated tsunami has been surfed is at Punta Hermosa in Peru, at the offshore Kon Tiki reef, where tsunami-generated waves from the 1974 Lima earthquake were ridden about 1 kilometre (0.62 mi) from the shore, before further rising and crashing into the nearby shoreline. The surfers did not know these were tsunami waves until after the event.

Surfable seismic-style waves generated from landslides, volcanic eruptions or meteorite impacts into the ocean are all possible, but all of these are very rare, unpredictable, and have not been documented as being surfed.

=== Glacial calving waves ===
Waves have been surfed and documented from the action of calving ice from glaciers, which falls into the adjacent water and forms a tsunami-type wave which surges away from the glacier.

=== Storm surges ===
These form when a large storm or hurricane forces water in front of it, due to the combined action of strong winds over long distances. The water can pile up towards the shore and create a moving surge of water.

These surges can be surfed, although they have not been specifically documented.

=== Backwash and sidewash waves ===
These occur where waves are formed from the returning backwash of a wave which has previously gone up a steep shoreline or beach, or sometimes reflected from an ocean rockface or wall. They can sometimes form a surfable wave in a direction oblique to, or opposite from the original wave direction. An example was shown in the film Endless Summer, in Tahiti, called 'Ins and Outs'.

Backwash breaking parallel to or obliquely to the angle of the shore is sometimes also called sidewash, which can form from the reflection of a wave breaking against adjacent obstructions such as jetties, groynes, or rockwalls, or simply from the action of backwashing waves which strike a shoreline at an angle.

Sidewash and backwash are relatively common, and may amplify another incoming breaking wave's size due to constructive interference. When this process happens with an open ocean swell the resulting wave can also be significantly larger due to constructive interference from either deep water refraction or diffraction, or both. This type of effect is suggested to occur at two of the largest surf breaks in the world, at Nazaré in Portugal, and Jaws in Hawaii.

Backwash and sidewash also sometimes form in conjunction with rips on beaches.

=== Standing river waves ===
These are formed from the action of fast flowing water over an uneven river or creek bed. The dynamics are very specific and not many naturally occurring surfable standing river waves are known, but examples include on the Zambesi river and near Munich, Germany.

Some rivers can also exhibit a surfable wave 'front' during flash flood events, particularly within narrow canyons. These have been ridden by people on surf craft caught in a flash flood event, such as on an inflatable tyre, although not usually intentionally. It is technically a wave front, with a breaking wave which can carry one downstream, so may be classified as a 'surf break', but others may classify this as simply a type of river riding.

=== Tidal bore waves ===
These form where strong tidal currents enter a river or deltaic system, pushing shorewards and creating a surfable wave, and can extend for many kilometers. Surfable examples are known in China, Sumatra, the Amazon Basin, and the United Kingdom. They can be multiple or single crested wave fronts.

=== Artificial wave pool waves ===
These are made in an artificially created pool with a powerful wave-generating device. Generally small, they can be surfed without any need for an ocean or shoreline. They are currently the subject of much research and development, and there are a number of commercial operations.

== Human influence ==
'Surf break' locations and the quality of surf may be negatively or positively affected by human activities.

In some cases, surf breaks themselves may be formed at least partly by human influences. These include the construction of local jetties (e.g. at Ocean Beach, New York), the dredging and dumping of nearby river sand (e.g. at Coolangatta's 'Superbank', Queensland, with sand sourced from the nearby Tweed River, which commenced in the late 1990s and has now formed an almost continuous 2 km long sand-bottomed point break), and sand buildup around local shipwrecks (e.g. at Stockton Beach, New South Wales). These effects may be either temporary or more or less permanent and may either benefit or impair local surf quality, in some cases having opposite effects on nearby surf breaks.

Generally, local surfers oppose potential unintentional consequences of local construction or development which may not have adequately assessed or considered the effect on local surf quality, particularly where the local surf quality is considered substantial or culturally or socioeconomically significant. Some world-renowned surf breaks have been significantly harmed or even destroyed by engineering or other human influences, even as others have been markedly improved.

=== Construction of jetties and groynes ===
Jetties and groynes create local sand buildup which may improve the local surf quality, as at Ocean Beach, New York, and Duranbah Beach, New South Wales, or impair it.

=== Construction of artificial harbors ===
These may create changes to local surf dynamics and so affect surf quality. Most were made in previous decades and centuries, when the effects on surf quality at the time were not known. Examples include at Newcastle Harbour, in New South Wales.

=== Shipwrecks ===
These unintentional 'constructions' may allow sand to build up around the wreck, sometimes forming surfable waves.

=== Sand dredging and dumping ===
Sand dredging and dumping from nearby rivers can affect the quality of nearby surf breaks by changing the amount of sand available to form over the bottom. In many sand bottom point breaks, more sand means better quality.

The 'Superbank' in Queensland is a world-class surf break, partly formed from the influence of nearby sand dredging and dumping. This sand is sourced from the nearby Tweed River, which dredging program began in the late 1990s. This program has generally improved the surf quality, forming a now more or less continuous 2 km long sand-bottomed surf break, linking up what were previously three different point breaks (Snapper, Greenmount, and Kirra) into one fairly continuous surf break, now also one of the longest point breaks in the world.

Whilst the surf quality at Snapper and Greenmount has generally improved, the bottom section of the break, the world-class Kirra point break, formerly considered one of the best in the world, has generally suffered.

Proposals have been put forward to attempt to alleviate or change the program so as to restore the quality of previous surf at Kirra, but it is not clear how the improvements would affect nearby Snapper and Greenmount. There may be an optimum amount of sand dredging and buildup that allows all three breaks to be generally improved, as was perhaps the case in the early 2000s.

=== Artificial reef breaks ===
'Artificial reef breaks' intentionally alter the local seabed dynamics to improve the local surf quality, not always with success. Public reaction to local artificial reef construction proposals is mixed and usually examined on a case-by-case basis.

They are the subject of current research and development, and a number of commercial operations are in existence.

=== Artificial standing waves ===
These form where lagoons disconnected to the ocean are deliberately breached, which allows a narrow fast flowing channel to form which lowers the water level and re-connect the inland water system with the ocean. Sometimes surfable 'standing waves' are formed and surfed during these events, which can become a cultural attraction.

=== Reef bombing ===
This is a largely illegal fishing activity that uses explosives over coral reefs to kill and stun the fish, allowing them to be then netted and caught more easily. The practice harms both marine life and surf conditions by changing and destroying the local seabed and coral topography.

=== Development and stabilization of sand dunes ===
The mobility of sand dunes sometimes allows a greater supply of sand to be deposited in adjacent local point breaks, creating more even surf conditions on these point break style waves. When these dunes are destroyed or stabilised, the supply of sand may be reduced, effecting local surf conditions. This has occurred at the Bruce's Beauties surf break in South Africa, where wave quality was no longer the same once the adjacent dunes were developed with residential style housing. Areas adjacent to river systems where the supply of sand is reduced can also be similarly affected.

In the surf movie The Endless Summer, the director comments on the "perfect breaking wave"—Cape St. Francis in South Africa. In its sequel, The Endless Summer II, the cape has taken on a different break due to the building of a housing development there, which required a sand mound to protect the shore from erosion. Sand was removed from the beaches to build the mound, drastically altering the wave and how it breaks. Such reformations of beaches, coastlines, and beachfront property alter the sand underneath the waves, block the natural wind flow to the ocean, and so can degrade surfing conditions.

== Effect of climate change ==
Surfing conditions change due to the global change in climate. The combustion of fossil fuels translates to rising sea levels through the melting of Earth's ice caps and thermal expansion. The rising sea levels increase the amount of condensation through the hydrologic cycle. With more precipitation in the atmosphere and increased global temperatures storms carry increased power. Swells and ocean currents in turn fuel surfable waves, though their quality is yet to be known.

As Earth evolves with increased carbon emissions into the atmosphere, surf breaks see alterations in size, speed, location, and quality of waves. Climate change affects surf breaks through altering the environment surrounding the surf break. There are also ways as a surfer to combat the future degradation of your local surf location.

=== Rising sea levels ===
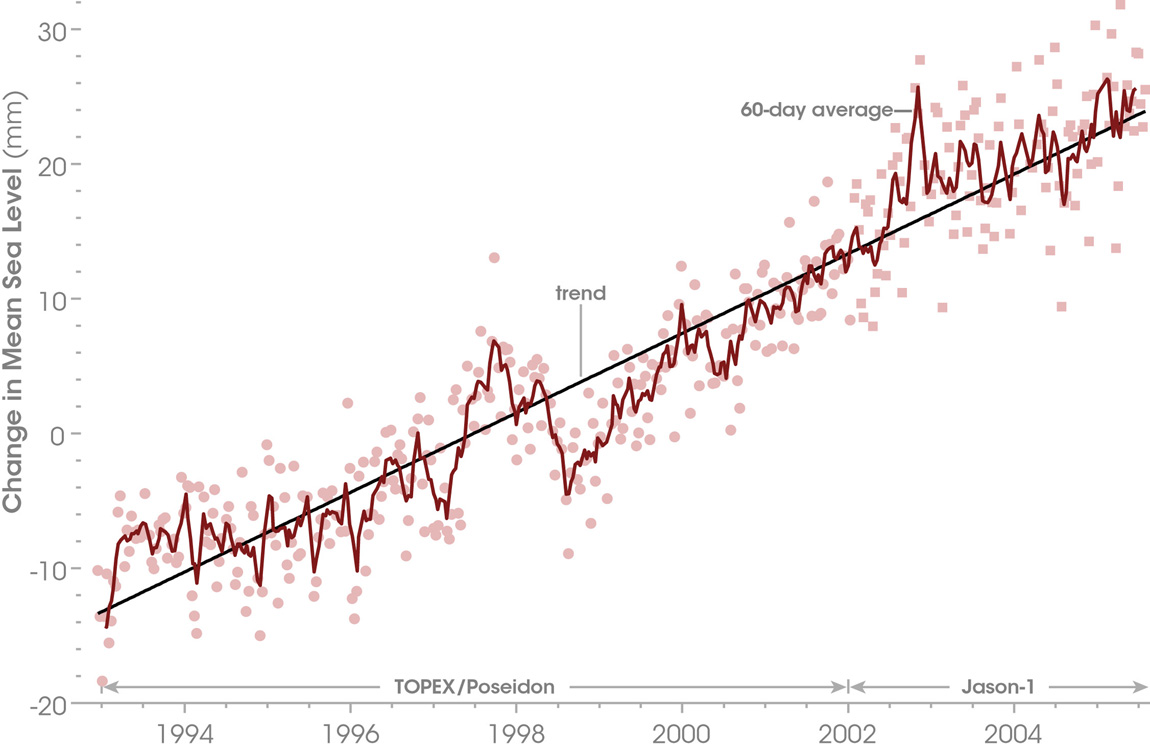
Sea level rise over time

With an increase in sea level, the way certain waves break will alter. Waves break due to the distance between the surface water and the sea floor. The average wave across the Earth will get smaller due to there being more water from melting ice caps. Combustion of fossil fuels as well as surface heating have increased the global temperature by 2 degrees Fahrenheit.

If a reef break depends on the tides, then the increase of water to the reef alters the tides. If a reef break breaks well on a high tide, after rising sea levels the reef break will break well on the low tide. More critically, a surf spot that currently breaks only on a low tide will cease to break.

Beach breaks are highly susceptible to sea level rise due to their reliance on the sea floor below. With the increased sea level, more sediment deposition occurs which can have various effects on surface waves.

Rising sea levels may have various effects on waves, though one thing is certain: rising sea levels will inevitably lower the size of waves.

==== Ocean currents ====
Across the world, Earth's currents push cold and warm water (see ocean current). With increased water from melting ice caps, currents have a larger body of water to push. Currents are slowing down globally, in some cases up by 15%. These currents can allow certain areas of the world to get cold when it is supposed to be warm, and vice versa. Reduced current power limits the power swells have on daily surf breaks.

=== Storms ===
Storms are increasing in quantity and potency. Higher category 4 and 5 storms are occurring, translating to intense swells. Storms drive powerful swells; so for an increase in storm power the waves will actually in turn become increased in size.

Though storms are supposed to create larger swells and better surf, waves are actually decreasing in size globally. Rising sea levels decrease the potency of storms; hurricanes and winds have a smaller impact on surf breaks only when the tides are higher.

==== Swells ====
Globally, with an increase in storm frequency and power, swells will become stronger and happen more often. The quality of surf is not yet known to the future swells due to variables such as sea level, ocean currents, and location on the earth. Additionally, the force driving the swells may vary due to the condition of global ocean currents.

=== Coral reef degradation ===
Since Earth's oceans are affected by global warming, thermal stress affects the coral reefs, slowly withering away until the coral bleaches. Coral bleaching eventually kills the coral. Sea level rise expands the ocean's area, acquiring more sediment as it grows. With more sediment under the sea, coral begins to become buried alive. As sedimentation occurs, reef breaks turn into beach breaks; which can have positive or negative impacts; depending on the circumstances of the break (wind, depth, location). Anthropogenic waste running off into the sewage lines that feed to the ocean, sprouting harmful algae blooms and murky water that limit the amount of sunlight coral reefs can absorb. Coral reefs provide some of the world's best waves; though they may not be around for long.

Coral reefs have a narrow window of temperature in which they can live. With an average increase in global temperatures of one degree per decade, and 90% of the heat being absorbed by the ocean. Coral reefs are in danger of becoming extinct by 2030. Coral reef loss creates beach breaks; which alter the nature of the wave.

==== Ocean acidification ====
With an increase of carbon emissions from the combustion of fossil fuels, the ocean acts as a sink for all of the extra CO_{2} in the atmosphere. CO_{2} naturally increases the acidity of the ocean, throwing the pH of the ocean to a more acidic state. Currently the acidity of the ocean has increased by 30%. The increase has led to coral reefs degrading, therefore impacting all of the reef breaks. Carbon dioxide absorbed into the ocean from the atmosphere reduces calcification rates in reef-building and reef-associated organisms by altering seawater chemistry through decreases in pH.

== Actions ==
In 2008, surfers and environmentalists opposed a toll road project in Orange County, California that would have changed sediment patterns and affected the world-class Trestles surf break north of San Onofre State Beach, which attracted 400,000 surfers in 2007.

In 2007, the NSW Geographical Names Register began formally recognizing names of surf breaks in Australia, defining a surf break as a "permanent obstruction such as a reef, headland, bombora, rock or sandbar, which causes waves to break".

One of the largest surf breaks in the world is the Jaws surf break in Maui, Hawaii, with waves that reach a maximum height of 12–18 m (40–60 ft). However waves which break off Nazaré in Portugal have been recorded to exceed 24 m (80 ft), with estimates of waves ridden up to over 30 m (100 ft), from trough to peak. The peculiar ocean bathymetry off Nazare is largely responsible for the very large wave faces.

== See also ==
- Artificial reef
- Breaking wave
- Wave breaking
