= Colbert House =

Colbert House may refer to:

- Colbert House (Gibsland, Louisiana), listed on the National Register of Historic Places in Louisiana
- Colbert House (Ilwaco, Washington), listed on the National Register of Historic Places in Washington
