= The Wreckers (disambiguation) =

The Wreckers are a US country music duo.

The Wreckers may also refer to:

- The Wreckers, a jazz group formed by Polish jazz pianist Andrzej Trzaskowski in the late 1950s
- The Wreckers (opera), by British composer Dame Ethel Smyth, first performed in 1906
- "The Wreckers", a song on the 2012 Rush album Clockwork Angels
- The Wreckers, a children's book by Iain Lawrence
- The Wreckers, a group of Autobot commandos created by Marvel UK

== See also ==
Wrecker (disambiguation)
