= The Wreckage =

The Wreckage may refer to:

- The Wreckage (Ocean Park, Washington), a log house
- The Wreckage, the debut album by Candlelight Red
- The Wreckage (album)), by American country singer Will Hoge
- "The Wreckage", a song by Throw the Fight from the album In Pursuit of Tomorrow, 2008
