= Wreck =

Wreck or The Wreck may refer to:

== Common uses ==
- Wreck, a collision of an automobile, aircraft or other vehicle
- Shipwreck, the remains of a ship after a crisis at sea

== Places ==
- The Wreck (surf spot), a surf spot at Byron Bay, New South Wales, Australia

== Arts, entertainment, and media ==
=== Films ===
- The Wreck (1913 film), an Australian film
- The Wreck (1927 film), an American film

=== Music ===
- The Wrecks, an American alternative rock band
- Wreck (band), an American indie rock band
- Wreck (album), a 2012 album by Unsane
- "Wreck", a song by Gentle Giant from their album Acquiring the Taste

=== Other uses in arts, entertainment, and media ===
- Wrecks, one-man play by Neil LaBute
- The Wreck, story by Guy de Maupassant
- Wreck (TV series), British comedy horror television series
- The Wreck (video game), a 2023 adventure game

== Other uses ==
- Wreck, a ceremony of initiation into the 40 et 8 club

== See also ==
- Emergency wreck buoy, a navigation mark warning of a new wreck.
- Rambling Wreck, a car that leads the Georgia Tech football team onto the field prior to every game in Bobby Dodd Stadium
- Receiver of Wreck, an official of the British government whose main task is to process incoming reports of wreck
- Reck (disambiguation)
- "Wreck Of The Hesperus"
  - Wreck of the Hesperus (band)
  - "Wreck of the Hesperus" (song)
- Wreck-It Ralph
- Wreck-It Ralph 2 also known as Ralph Breaks the Internet
- Wreckage (disambiguation)
- WREK (FM), a radio station at Georgia Tech, named after the car
