= Wrecker =

Wrecker, The Wrecker or Wrecking may refer to:

- Tow truck, the most common form of recovery vehicle
- Wrecking, a synonym for demolition
- A person who participates in sabotage
- Wrecking (crime), a crime of industrial or economic sabotage
- Wrecking (shipwreck), hauling away valuables from a shipwreck
- Crane (rail)

== Film and television ==
- Wrecker (film), a 2015 film
- The Wrecker (1929 film), based on Ridley's play
- The Wrecker (1933 film)
- The Wrecker (2025 film)
- "Wrecker", a clone trooper in the Star Wars series
- Wreckers (film), a 2011 film
- Wreckers (Transformers), a sub-team of Autobots in the fictional Transformers Universe
- Dr. Wrecker, the nickname of the character Rob in The Amazing World of Gumball
- Thee Wreckers, characters in Thee Wreckers Tetralogy by artist filmmaker Rosto

== Literature ==
- Wrecker (comics), a Marvel Comics supervillain
- The Wrecker (Cussler novel), a 2009 novel by Clive Cussler and Justin Scott
- The Wrecker (Stevenson novel), an 1892 novel by Robert Louis Stevenson and Lloyd Osbourne
- The Wrecker (play), a 1924 play by Arnold Ridley
- Wrecker (Hiaasen novel), a 2023 young adult novel by Carl Hiaasen

== Music ==
- Wrecker, an album by the Mono Men
- "Wrecker", a song by Megadeth from Th1rt3en
- The Wreckers, a musical country duo
- The Wreckers (opera), a 1906 opera by Ethel Smyth
- "The Wreckers", a song by Rush from the 2012 album Clockwork Angels
- "Thee Wreckers", a music project by artist/musician Rosto

== People ==
- The Wrecker, nickname for American professional bodybuilder Sarah Dunlap

== See also ==
- The Wreckers (disambiguation)
- Wrecked (disambiguation)
