= Raymond Public Library (Washington) =

- U.S. National Register of Historic Places
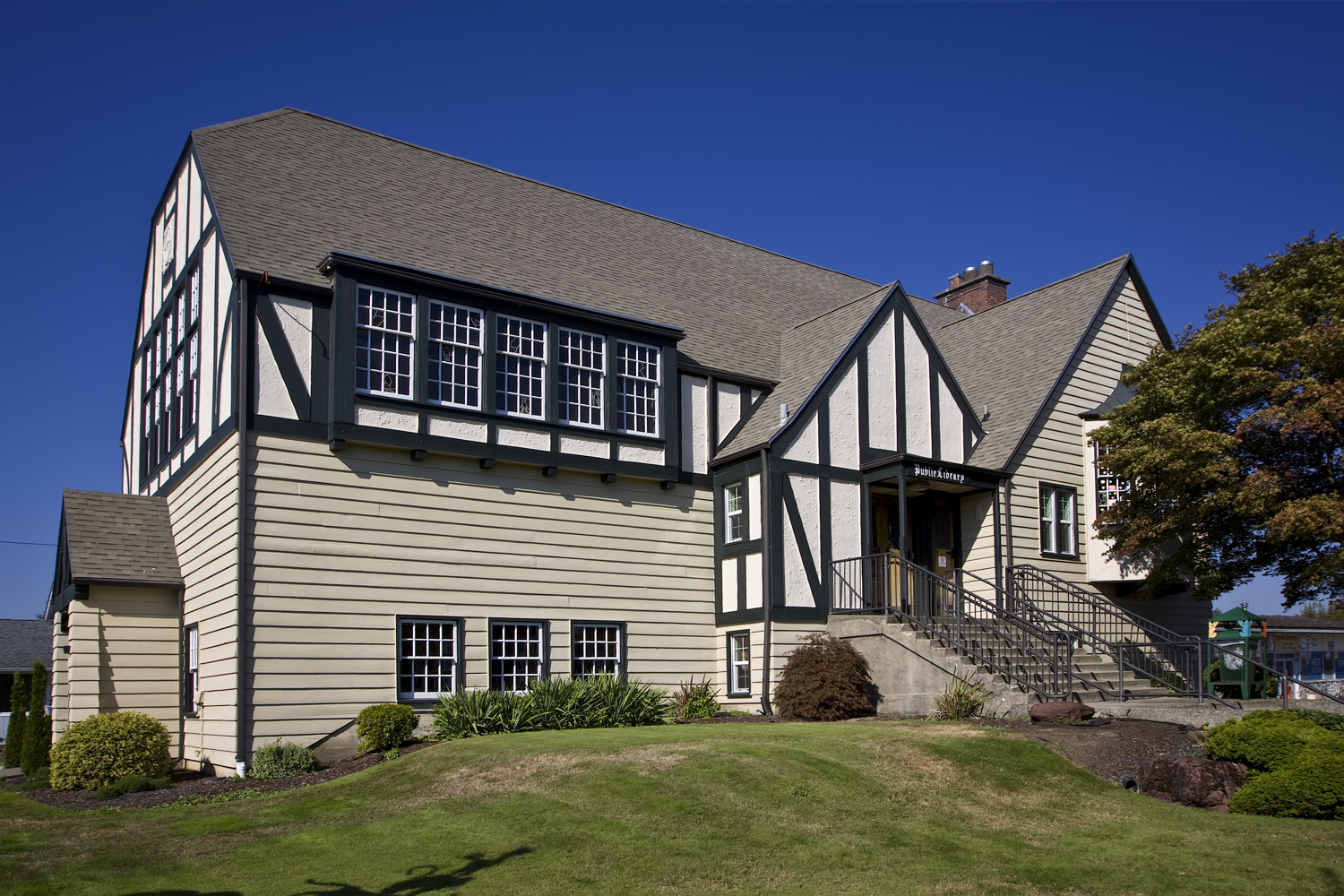

- Location within Washington (state)
- Location: 507 Duryea St., Raymond, Washington
- Coordinates: 46°41′40″N 123°43′45″W
- Area: less than one acre
- Built: 1928
- Architect: Arch N. Torbitt
- Architectural style: English cottage
- NRHP reference No.: 79002548
- Added to NRHP: November 29, 1979

The Raymond Public Library is located in Raymond, Washington. It was added to the National Register of Historic Places in 1979.

== Description ==
The Raymond Public Library was designed by Seattle architect Arch N. Torbitt and construction was supervised by contractor W. T. Stapleton. The building, situated on four city lots, has two stories and is built in the style of English cottages. The exterior is made from stucco, half-timber, and shiplap.

Unknown artists contributed art glass pieces for the window panes, some replicating old English bookplates and others depicting characters from children's tales.

The library was dedicated on July 26, 1929. The modern building is much as it was when built. Modifications have been made to add weather protection to entrances. The hemlock floors have been carpeted to protect from damage.

== History ==
An attic in the Young People's Building housed the town's first library in 1911, operated by volunteers. Land for the public library was donated by Charles L. Lewis of the Raymond Lumber Company in 1919. The city raised $25,000 through bonds to finance construction. Women's clubs of Raymond provided the furnishings for the club and committee rooms.

The original design of the library called for stucco-covered brick. The costs for that style of construction exceeded the budget; in addition, Raymond is a logging town, and citizens argued that the project should use locally-sourced lumber. The accepted bid was for a wood-frame structure.

A portrait of Lewis, who donated the land, was hung over the fireplace. Seventeen volumes of stories and records of Civil War leaders were donated to the library by a local doctor in 1927.

In 1941, the Raymond Public Library, with the assistance of the Works Projects Administration (WPA), began sponsoring a bookmobile to provide library services to rural areas of Pacific County and Grays Harbor County. The bookmobile service was discontinued on June 30, 1942, because new WPA policy was to focus efforts only on activities that contribute to the national defense effort.

The Raymond Public Library opened a branch at the Ilwaco High School in Ilwaco, Washington in February 1941.

== Current use ==
The Raymond Public Library joined the Timberland Regional Library system in 1968.
