= National Register of Historic Places listings in Wahkiakum County, Washington =

Location of Wahkiakum County in Washington

This list presents the full set of buildings, structures, objects, sites, or districts designated on the National Register of Historic Places in Wahkiakum County, Washington, and offers brief descriptive information about each of them. The National Register recognizes places of national, state, or local historic significance across the United States. Out of over 90,000 National Register sites nationwide, Washington is home to approximately 1,500, and 6 of those are found in Wahkiakum County.

This National Park Service list is complete through NPS recent listings posted March 21, 2025.

== Current listings ==
	Name on the Register	Image	Date listed	Location	City or town	Description
1	Columbia River Gillnet Boat	Columbia River Gillnet Boat	February 14, 1978 (#78002783)	Altoona Cannery; 46°15′58″N 123°39′15″W	Altoona	
2	Deep River Pioneer Lutheran Church	Deep River Pioneer Lutheran Church	August 7, 1974 (#74001983)	N of Deep River; 46°21′35″N 123°40′55″W	Deep River	
3	Grays River Covered Bridge	Grays River Covered Bridge	November 23, 1971 (#71000880)	WA 4, 1.5 mi (2.4 km). E of Grays River; 46°21′17″N 123°34′47″W	Grays River	Historic Bridges and Tunnels in Washington TR
4	Julia Butler Hansen House	Julia Butler Hansen House	May 9, 2024 (#100010342)	35 Butler Street; 46°12′12″N 123°23′04″W	Cathlamet	
5	Pioneer Church	Pioneer Church	April 11, 1973 (#73001893)	Alley St. 46°12′05″N 123°23′01″W	Cathlamet	
6	Skamokawa Historic District	Skamokawa Historic District	April 21, 1976 (#76001923)	WA 4; 46°16′55″N 123°26′47″W	Skamokawa	

== See also ==
- National Register of Historic Places listings in Washington state
- Listings in neighboring counties: Clatsop, Columbia, Cowlitz, Lewis, Pacific
- Historic preservation
- History of Washington (state)
- Index of Washington (state)-related articles
