= John Reck =

American politician

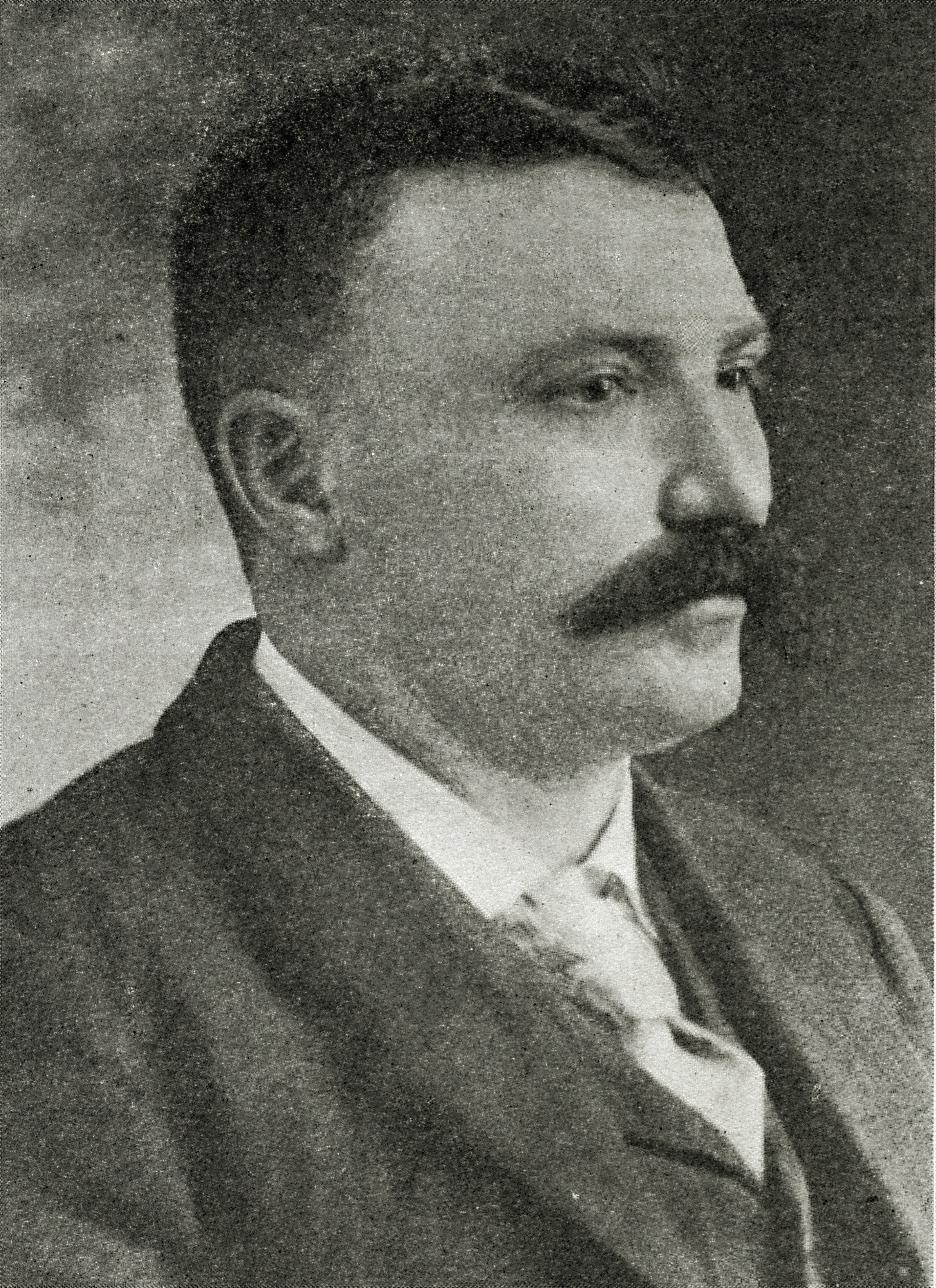

Mayor of Juneau, Alaska
- In office 1914–1916
- Preceded by: Charles Carter
- Succeeded by: Benjamin D. Stewart

Personal details
- Born: April 13, 1865 Elkader, Iowa
- Died: ca. May 1951 (aged 86)
- Occupation: Banker

John Reck (1865-1951) was an Alaskan politician and the ninth mayor of Juneau, Alaska, from 1914 to 1916.
