= Raymond, Washington =

Raymond
- City
- Raymond, Washington
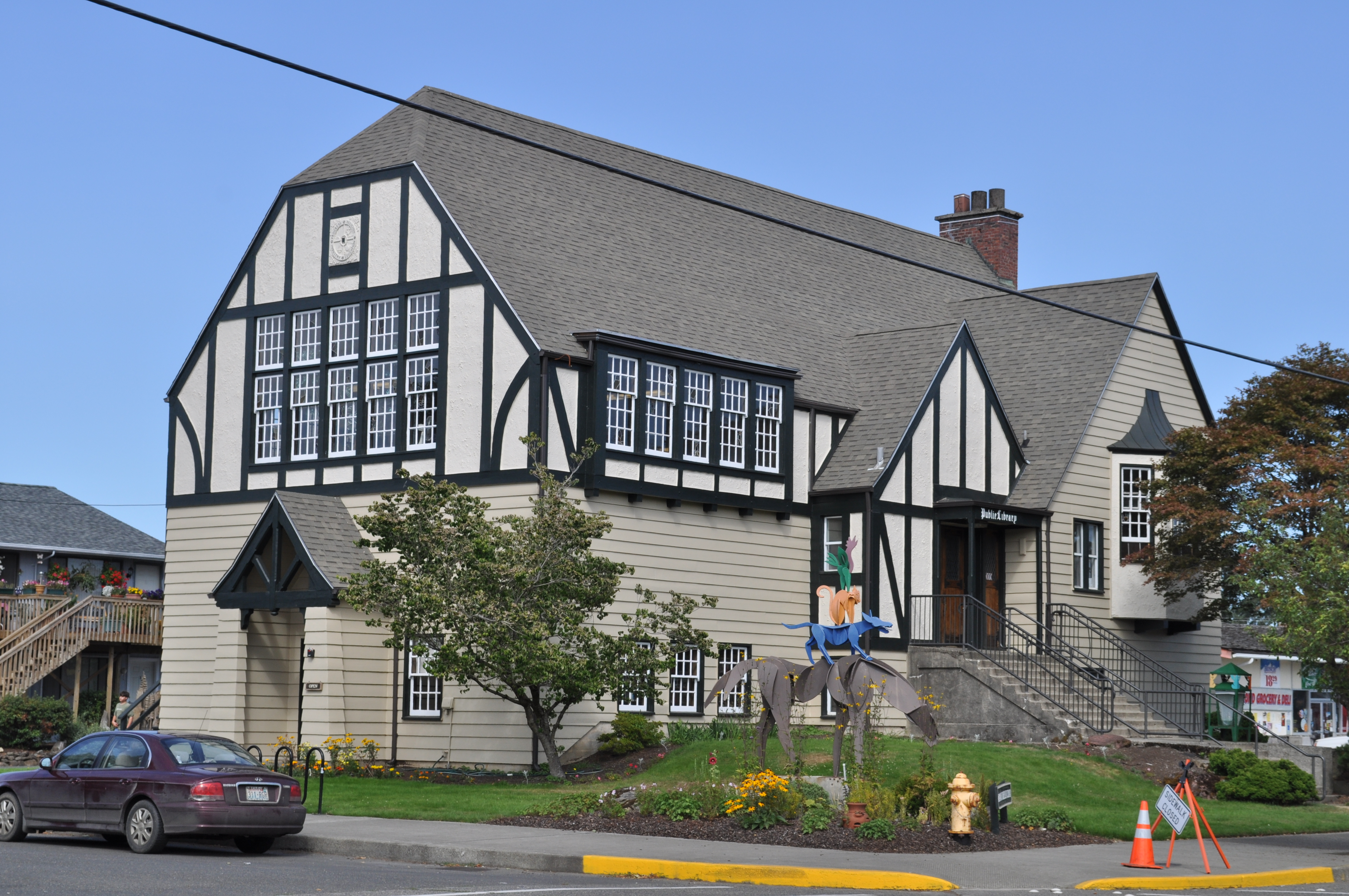
- Raymond Timberland Library

- Location of Raymond, Washington
- Coordinates: 46°40′47″N 123°45′05″W
- Country: United States
- State: Washington
- County: Pacific

Government
  - Type: Mayor–council

Area
  - Total: 4.69 sq mi (12.14 km^{2})
  - Land: 4.09 sq mi (10.59 km^{2})
  - Water: 0.60 sq mi (1.55 km^{2})
- Elevation: 0 ft (0 m)

Population (2020)
  - Total: 3,081
  - Density: 753.5/sq mi (290.9/km^{2})
- Time zone: UTC-8 (Pacific (PST))
  - Summer (DST): UTC-7 (PDT)
- ZIP Code: 98577
- Area code(s): 360, 564
- FIPS code: 53-57430
- GNIS feature ID: 2411525
- Website: City of Raymond

Raymond is a city in Pacific County, Washington, United States. The population was 2,882 at the 2010 census. The 2020 census showed the population of 3,081, an increase of 6.4%. The town's economy has traditionally been based on logging and fishing, together with a limited amount of tourism.

== History ==
Raymond was incorporated on August 6, 1907. Raymond was named after L.V. Raymond, who was the first postmaster in Raymond. In the early years, Raymond's business section was built on stilts five or six feet above the tidelands and sloughs that crisscrossed the site. Elevated sidewalks and streets connected most of the buildings. Raymond claimed a population of 6,000 in the year 1913 and had a reputation as a wild and wooly lumber mill town. City fathers resisted the unwanted reputation with promotions of Raymond as "The Empire City of Willapa Harbor" and "The City That Does Things". Lyricist Robert Wells, who wrote "The Christmas Song" with Mel Tormé, was born in Raymond in 1922. Raymond is the city where the grunge band Nirvana played their first gig, on March 7, 1987.

After Washington Initiative 502 was passed in November 2012, which legalized the recreational use of marijuana, Raymond has become a center for cultivation and sale of the drug. Raymond's economy historically revolved around logging and fishing, but the decline of those jobs over time and the arrival of marijuana producers and processors have led the town to encourage the business.

== Geography ==
According to the United States Census Bureau, the city has a total area of 4.62 square miles (11.97 km^{2}), of which, 4.06 square miles (10.52 km^{2}) is land and 0.56 square miles (1.45 km^{2}) is water.

=== Climate ===
According to the Köppen Climate Classification system, Raymond has a warm-summer Mediterranean climate, abbreviated "Csb" on climate maps.

On June 27, 2021, Raymond reached a maximum recorded temperature of 103 degrees Fahrenheit.

Climate data for Raymond, Washington, 1991–2020 normals, extremes 1980–present
Month	Jan	Feb	Mar	Apr	May	Jun	Jul	Aug	Sep	Oct	Nov	Dec	Year
Record high °F (°C)	66 (19)	75 (24)	79 (26)	89 (32)	94 (34)	107 (42)	100 (38)	102 (39)	99 (37)	88 (31)	70 (21)	69 (21)	107 (42)
Mean maximum °F (°C)	56.8 (13.8)	60.6 (15.9)	67.9 (19.9)	75.0 (23.9)	82.5 (28.1)	85.6 (29.8)	88.7 (31.5)	90.6 (32.6)	85.1 (29.5)	73.0 (22.8)	60.7 (15.9)	56.5 (13.6)	93.6 (34.2)
Mean daily maximum °F (°C)	47.9 (8.8)	50.5 (10.3)	54.0 (12.2)	57.9 (14.4)	63.3 (17.4)	66.7 (19.3)	71.7 (22.1)	72.8 (22.7)	70.2 (21.2)	60.5 (15.8)	51.7 (10.9)	46.6 (8.1)	59.5 (15.3)
Daily mean °F (°C)	40.5 (4.7)	41.5 (5.3)	44.3 (6.8)	47.6 (8.7)	53.1 (11.7)	57.0 (13.9)	61.1 (16.2)	61.6 (16.4)	57.9 (14.4)	50.1 (10.1)	43.4 (6.3)	39.5 (4.2)	49.8 (9.9)
Mean daily minimum °F (°C)	33.0 (0.6)	32.4 (0.2)	34.6 (1.4)	37.3 (2.9)	43.0 (6.1)	47.3 (8.5)	50.9 (10.5)	50.4 (10.2)	45.6 (7.6)	39.7 (4.3)	35.2 (1.8)	32.4 (0.2)	40.2 (4.5)
Mean minimum °F (°C)	22.3 (−5.4)	22.5 (−5.3)	26.0 (−3.3)	29.0 (−1.7)	32.7 (0.4)	38.5 (3.6)	42.5 (5.8)	41.9 (5.5)	36.2 (2.3)	28.9 (−1.7)	23.8 (−4.6)	21.3 (−5.9)	17.1 (−8.3)
Record low °F (°C)	5 (−15)	5 (−15)	17 (−8)	25 (−4)	28 (−2)	34 (1)	37 (3)	35 (2)	29 (−2)	17 (−8)	9 (−13)	3 (−16)	3 (−16)
Average precipitation inches (mm)	13.05 (331)	8.70 (221)	9.74 (247)	6.54 (166)	3.64 (92)	2.61 (66)	0.91 (23)	1.36 (35)	3.11 (79)	8.33 (212)	13.02 (331)	12.64 (321)	83.65 (2,124)
Average snowfall inches (cm)	0.5 (1.3)	0.1 (0.25)	0.0 (0.0)	0.0 (0.0)	0.0 (0.0)	0.0 (0.0)	0.0 (0.0)	0.0 (0.0)	0.0 (0.0)	0.0 (0.0)	0.0 (0.0)	0.5 (1.3)	1.1 (2.85)
Average precipitation days (≥ 0.01 in)	22.7	19.5	22.9	20.6	16.2	14.3	7.7	8.6	11.7	20.5	23.0	23.0	210.7
Average snowy days (≥ 0.1 in)	0.1	0.1	0.0	0.0	0.0	0.0	0.0	0.0	0.0	0.0	0.1	0.1	0.4
Source 1: NOAA
Source 2: National Weather Service

== Demographics ==
Historical population
Census	Pop.	Note	%±
1910	2,450		—
1920	4,260		73.9%
1930	3,828		−10.1%
1940	4,045		5.7%
1950	4,110		1.6%
1960	3,301		−19.7%
1970	3,126		−5.3%
1980	2,991		−4.3%
1990	2,901		−3.0%
2000	2,975		2.6%
2010	2,882		−3.1%
2020	3,081		6.9%
U.S. Decennial Census; 2020 Census

=== 2020 census ===
As of the 2020 census, Raymond had a population of 3,081. The median age was 42.2 years. 23.6% of residents were under the age of 18 and 20.1% of residents were 65 years of age or older. For every 100 females there were 104.4 males, and for every 100 females age 18 and over there were 100.8 males age 18 and over.

0.0% of residents lived in urban areas, while 100.0% lived in rural areas.

There were 1,254 households in Raymond, of which 30.3% had children under the age of 18 living in them. Of all households, 40.2% were married-couple households, 22.6% were households with a male householder and no spouse or partner present, and 28.8% were households with a female householder and no spouse or partner present. About 33.7% of all households were made up of individuals and 15.1% had someone living alone who was 65 years of age or older.

There were 1,359 housing units, of which 7.7% were vacant. The homeowner vacancy rate was 2.7% and the rental vacancy rate was 8.3%.

Racial composition as of the 2020 census
Race	Number	Percent
White	2,095	68.0%
Black or African American	11	0.4%
American Indian and Alaska Native	86	2.8%
Asian	181	5.9%
Native Hawaiian and Other Pacific Islander	8	0.3%
Some other race	327	10.6%
Two or more races	373	12.1%
Hispanic or Latino (of any race)	552	17.9%

=== 2010 census ===
At the 2010 census there were 2,882 people, 1,151 households, and 698 families living in the city. The population density was 709.9 inhabitants per square mile (274.1/km^{2}). There were 1,279 housing units at an average density of 315.0 per square mile (121.6/km^{2}). The racial makeup of the city was 75.9% White, 0.9% African American, 2.5% Native American, 6.8% Asian, 10.1% from other races, and 3.9% from two or more races. Hispanic or Latino of any race were 16.2%.

Of the 1,151 households 29.4% had children under the age of 18 living with them, 42.9% were married couples living together, 10.4% had a female householder with no husband present, 7.3% had a male householder with no wife present, and 39.4% were non-families. 33.4% of households were one person and 15.2% were one person aged 65 or older. The average household size was 2.46 and the average family size was 3.10.

The median age was 41 years. 23.4% of residents were under the age of 18; 8.6% were between the ages of 18 and 24; 22.2% were from 25 to 44; 27.5% were from 45 to 64; and 18.4% were 65 or older. The gender makeup of the city was 49.9% male and 50.1% female.

=== 2000 census ===
At the 2000 census there were 2,975 people, 1,192 households, and 760 families living in the city. The population density was 776.4 people per square mile (299.9/km^{2}). There were 1,338 housing units at an average density of 349.2 per square mile (134.9/km^{2}). The racial makeup of the city was 83.70% White, 0.24% African American, 2.72% Native American, 7.06% Asian, 0.17% Pacific Islander, 3.16% from other races, and 2.96% from two or more races. Hispanic or Latino of any race were 9.18%. 12.0% were of English, 11.6% German, 7.6% Irish, 6.0% American and 5.7% Polish ancestry according to Census 2000.

Of the 1,192 households 30.0% had children under the age of 18 living with them, 45.9% were married couples living together, 11.3% had a female householder with no husband present, and 36.2% were non-families. 30.8% of households were one person and 16.5% were one person aged 65 or older. The average household size was 2.44 and the average family size was 3.00.

The age distribution was 26.2% under the age of 18, 7.9% from 18 to 24, 23.5% from 25 to 44, 22.9% from 45 to 64, and 19.6% 65 or older. The median age was 40 years. For every 100 females, there were 96.0 males. For every 100 females age 18 and over, there were 94.0 males.

The median household income was $25,759 and the median family income was $33,984. Males had a median income of $29,402 versus $24,647 for females. The per capita income for the city was $13,910. About 17.2% of families and 24.6% of the population were below the poverty line, including 28.4% of those under age 18 and 20.7% of those age 65 or over.

== Arts and culture ==
=== Historic buildings and sites ===
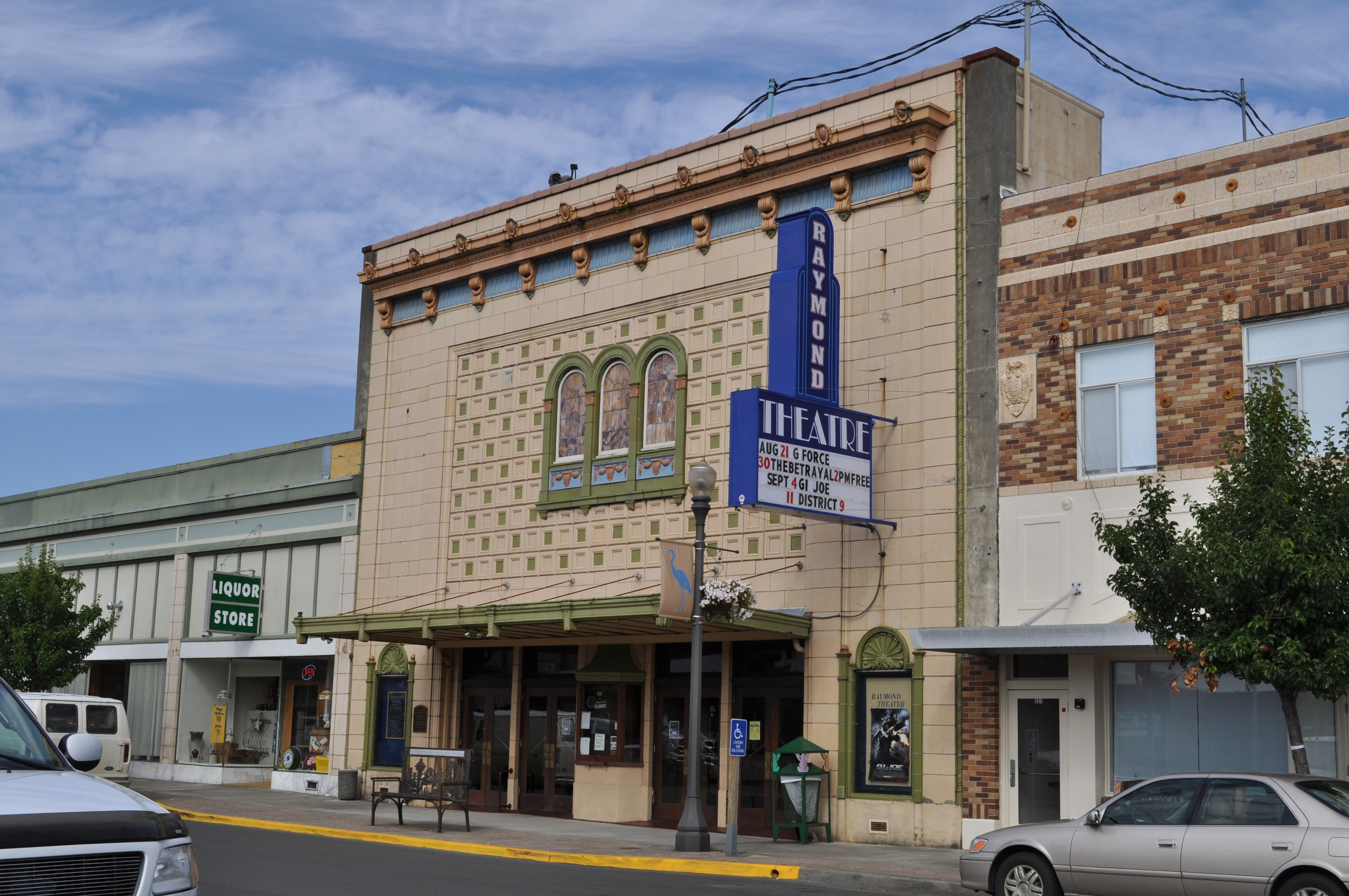
The Raymond Theatre is one of three buildings in Raymond listed on the National Register of Historic Places

The city is home to the Raymond Theatre which was built in 1928 and listed on the National Register of Historic Places (NRHP) in 1991. The Raymond Public Library was built in 1929 and listed on the NRHP in 1979.

The Willapa River Swing Bridge, also known as the Raymond Trestle, is located near the center of the city. Restoration efforts have been explored to add the bridge to the Willapa Hills Trail.

=== Museums ===
The Northwest Carriage Museum contains a collection of historic carriages, buggies, and sleighs, including a Shelburne landau that was used in Gone with the Wind and Jezebel. The Seaport Museum provides exhibits and artifacts of Raymond's maritime and logging history.

== Parks and recreation ==
The Willapa Hills Trail courses through Raymond and incorporates the Raymond Wildlife-Heritage Sculpture Corridor, a collection of steel sculptures first installed in 1993. The city contains over 200 such artworks.

== See also ==
- Willapa Bay
- Steamboats of Willapa Bay

== Sources ==
- Pacific County Historical Society
