= Raymond Theatre =

- U.S. National Register of Historic Places
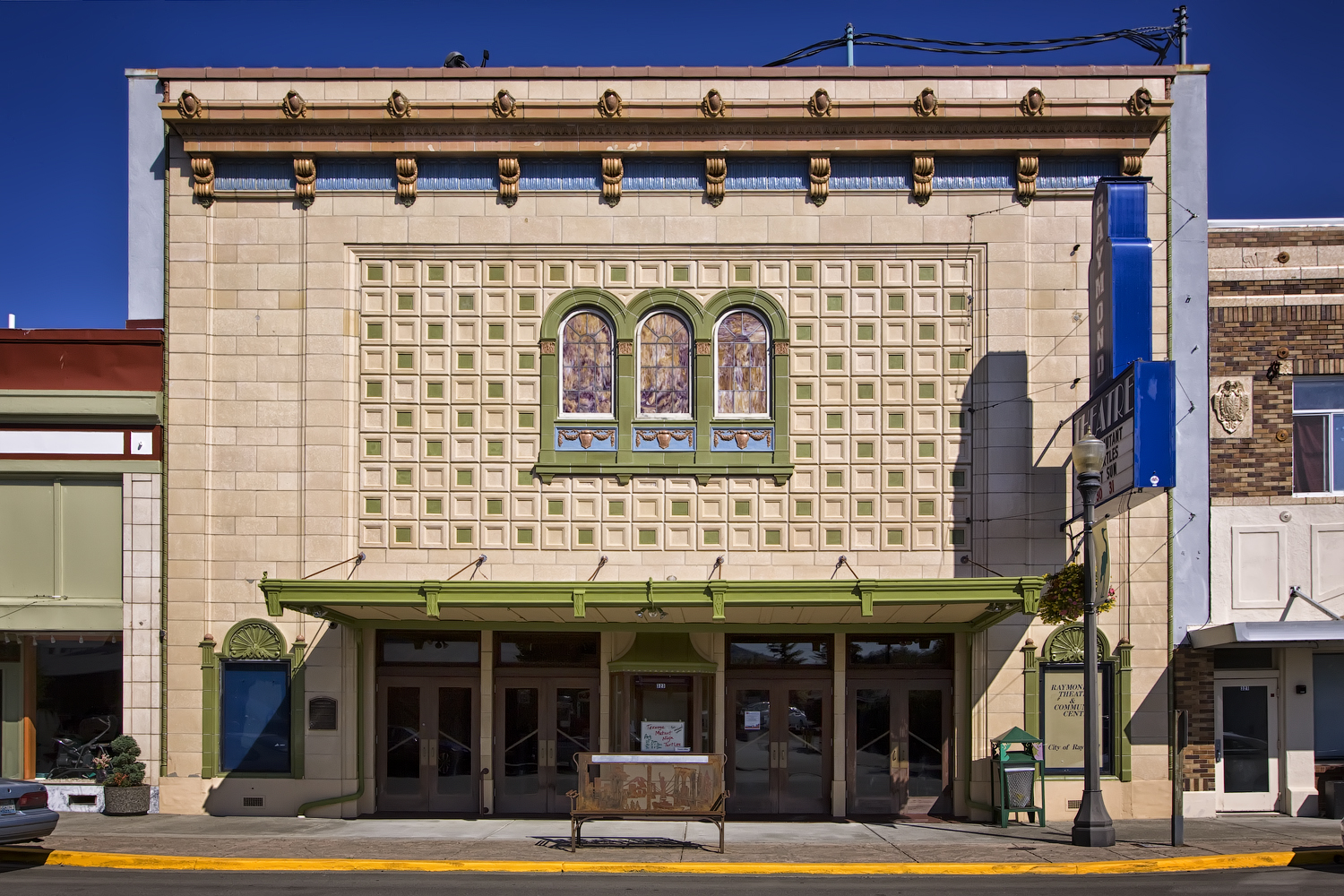

- Location within Washington (state)
- Location: 325 N. Third St., Raymond, Washington
- Coordinates: 46°41′10.41″N 123°43′59.52″W
- Built: 1928
- Architects: Grant, William R.; Scheer, B.F.
- Architectural style: Renaissance
- NRHP reference No.: 91000540
- Added to NRHP: May 01, 1991

The Raymond Theatre is located in Raymond, Washington. It was built in 1928 by Asef G. Basil with 360 seats and a Hope-Jones Wurlitzer theater organ. The Raymond Theatre is owned by the city of Raymond and is operated as a community theatre.
