= The Wreckage (Ocean Park, Washington) =

Historic house in Washington, United States

- U.S. National Register of Historic Places
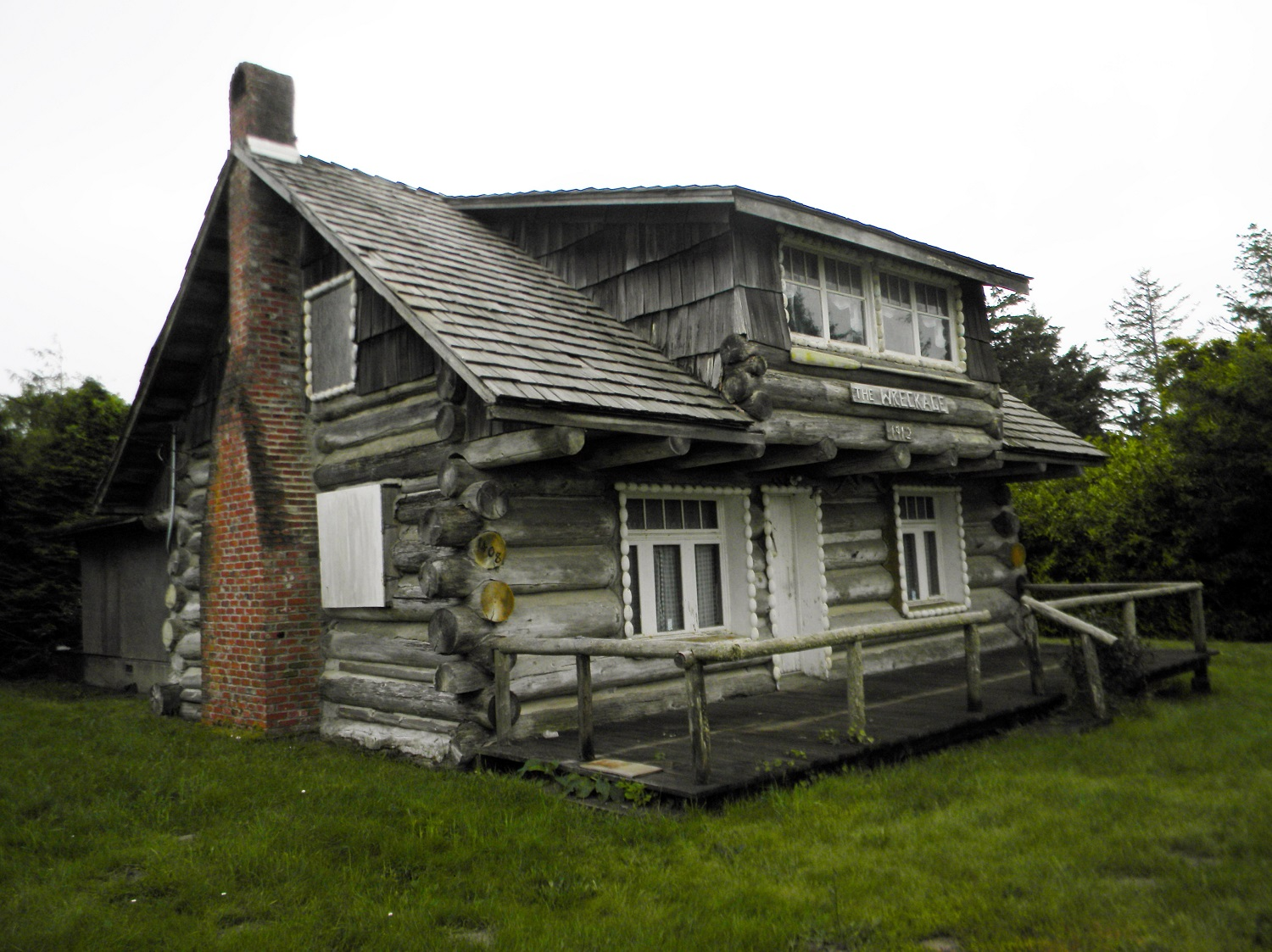

- Location within Washington (state)
- Location: 1408 256th Pl., Ocean Park, Washington
- Coordinates: 46°29′15.39″N 124°3′02.7″W
- Area: 1 acre (0.40 ha)
- Built: 1912
- Built by: Guy Allison
- Architect: Guy Allison and Matthews Zhetley
- NRHP reference No.: 79002547
- Added to NRHP: September 18, 1979

The Wreckage is a log house in Ocean Park, Washington, constructed of unhewn logs in 1912. The house was built by author Guy S. Allison on the Long Beach Peninsula as a beach house, using salvaged materials. Recovering driftwood from the Pacific Ocean, Allison also made what he called a "zoo" of driftwood animal shapes surrounding the house that appear on U.S. Geological Survey maps as "Wreckage Park Zoo." The collection was featured in Ripley's Believe It or Not! and Strange as it Seems.

== Guy S. Allison ==
Guy Selwin Allison was born near Hannibal, Missouri, on December 24, 1883. He arrived in Washington in 1906, attended the Washington State Normal School in Bellingham, and became a teacher and principal in Tacoma in 1907–1909. In 1911, he married his wife, Virginia, honeymooning on property in Ocean Park that he had purchased the same year. He left teaching, for health reasons, to work in the outdoors, and began writing his Bypaths of History syndicated column for western United States newspapers in the 1930s.

== Description ==
The Wreckage is a log cabin, largely built of found and salvaged materials. The location on the Pacific coast near the mouth of the Columbia River provided considerable opportunity for salvage from wrecked timber-carrying ships. The primary log structure came from a large raft of logs that broke up on the Columbia River bar in the winter of 1911, with logs spreading from Tillamook Head in Oregon to Leadbetter Point in Washington. The house's tongue-and-groove lumber was thrown overboard from the steamer Washington the same winter as it narrowly avoided being wrecked inside the Columbia's mouth. Cement for the foundation was obtained from the wrecked French barque Alice. Allison recovered the materials from the beach and planned a blockhouse-like cabin based on cabins he had seen in Sitka, Alaska, using simple hand tools to build the house.

The house is a 1 1/2-story structure, built in 1912, using 30-foot (9.1 m) logs on the front and rear, and 24-foot (7.3 m) logs on the sides. It rests on a concrete block foundation. The overhanging roof has gables at the ends and shed dormers in each of the long sides, extending out over the eaves to the edge of the roof. Window and door openings were sawn out of the solid log structure, with wood surrounds embellished with fishing net floats. A brick chimney stands at one end and another chimney is near the center of the house.

The Wreckage was listed on the National Register of Historic Places on September 18, 1979. The driftwood zoo gradually disappeared over the years, as did several outbuildings, including a garage that Allison called "The Wreckagette."

Author Walter A. Tompkins set his novel CQ Ghost Ship at The Wreckage.
