= The Wreck (surf spot) =

Surf spot in Byron Bay

Coordinates: 28.637086°S 153.610378°E

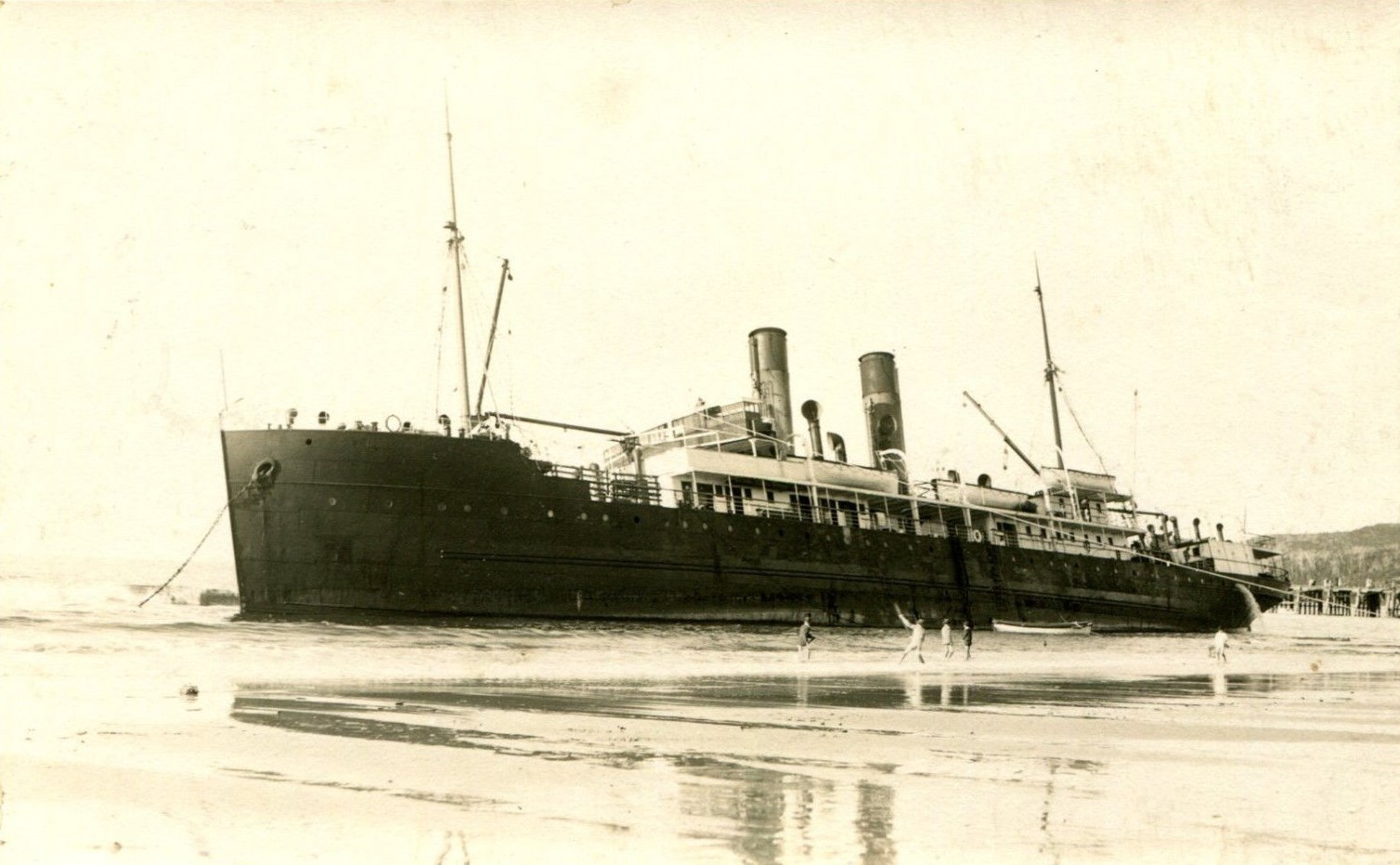
SS Wollongbar, wrecked at Byron Bay, NSW, 14 May 1921

The Wreck is a surf spot located at Byron Bay, New South Wales, Australia. It is approximately 30 metres (98 ft) off the shore of Belongil Beach (at the town end), and approximately 60 metres (200 ft) from the Main Beach Car Park.

== Background ==
The Wreck is named for the remains of the SS Wollongbar lodged just offshore. The ship lost its tie to the old Byron Bay Pier during a cyclone in 1922 and sank. It is approximately 87 metres (285 ft) long running parallel to the beach. On the eastern end of the Wreck one can see the rudder tiller and at low tide one can see the boilers.

The Wreck is best surfed on mid-high tide with a W - SE wind, on a N/NE swell of 3 to 6 feet. When working well, a fast, hollow and powerful right-hander breaks on the sand bank about 10 metres (33 ft) in front of the shipwreck.
