= Colbert House (Ilwaco, Washington) =

Historic house in Washington, United States

- U.S. National Register of Historic Places
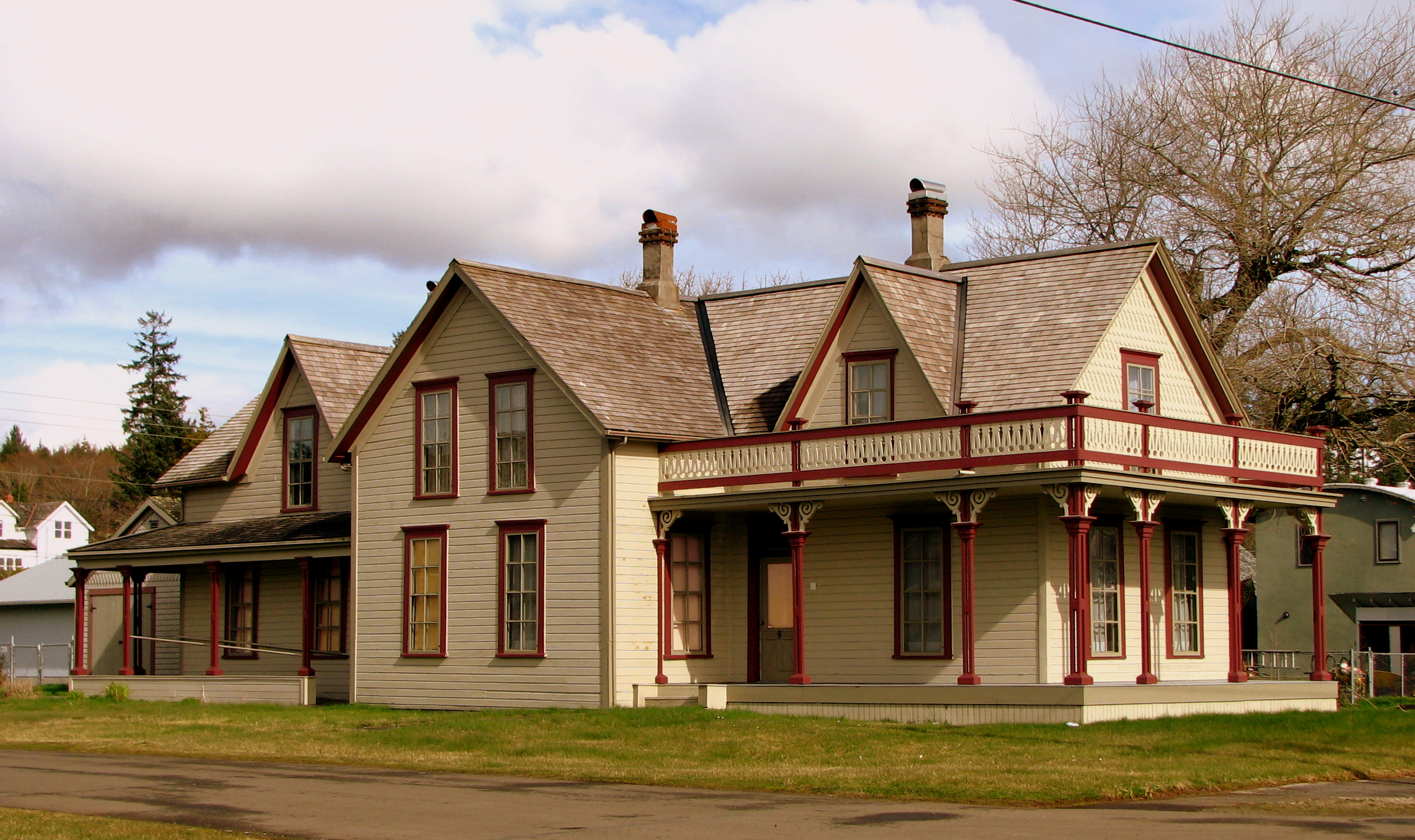

- Location within Washington (state)
- Location: Ilwaco, Washington
- Coordinates: 46°18′31″N 124°02′06″W
- Area: Less than one acre
- Built: 1872
- Architectural style: Vernacular
- NRHP reference No.: 77001347
- Added to NRHP: October 17, 1977

The Colbert House is a historic house museum owned by Washington State Parks and located in Ilwaco, Washington, at the corner of Quaker and Lake streets. The house was originally built in 1872 and was moved to its current site in 1883. The house was owned by a fishery and cannery family, Frederick and Catherine (Petit) Colbert and descendants, and was restored in 1994 to a late 19th-century appearance with Colbert family furnishings and decorative items. Following its restoration, the house was operated by Cape Disappointment State Park as a historic house museum that was open by appointment only. In 2009, the Long Beach Area Parks Management Plan deemed the operation of the building as a house museum to be "not feasible at this time" and that "State Parks will preserve the building until such time as a feasible and sustainable use becomes apparent."

Colbert House is a Washington State Parks Heritage Site and on the National Register of Historic Places.
