= Ilwaco, Washington =

Ilwaco
- City
- Ilwaco, Washington
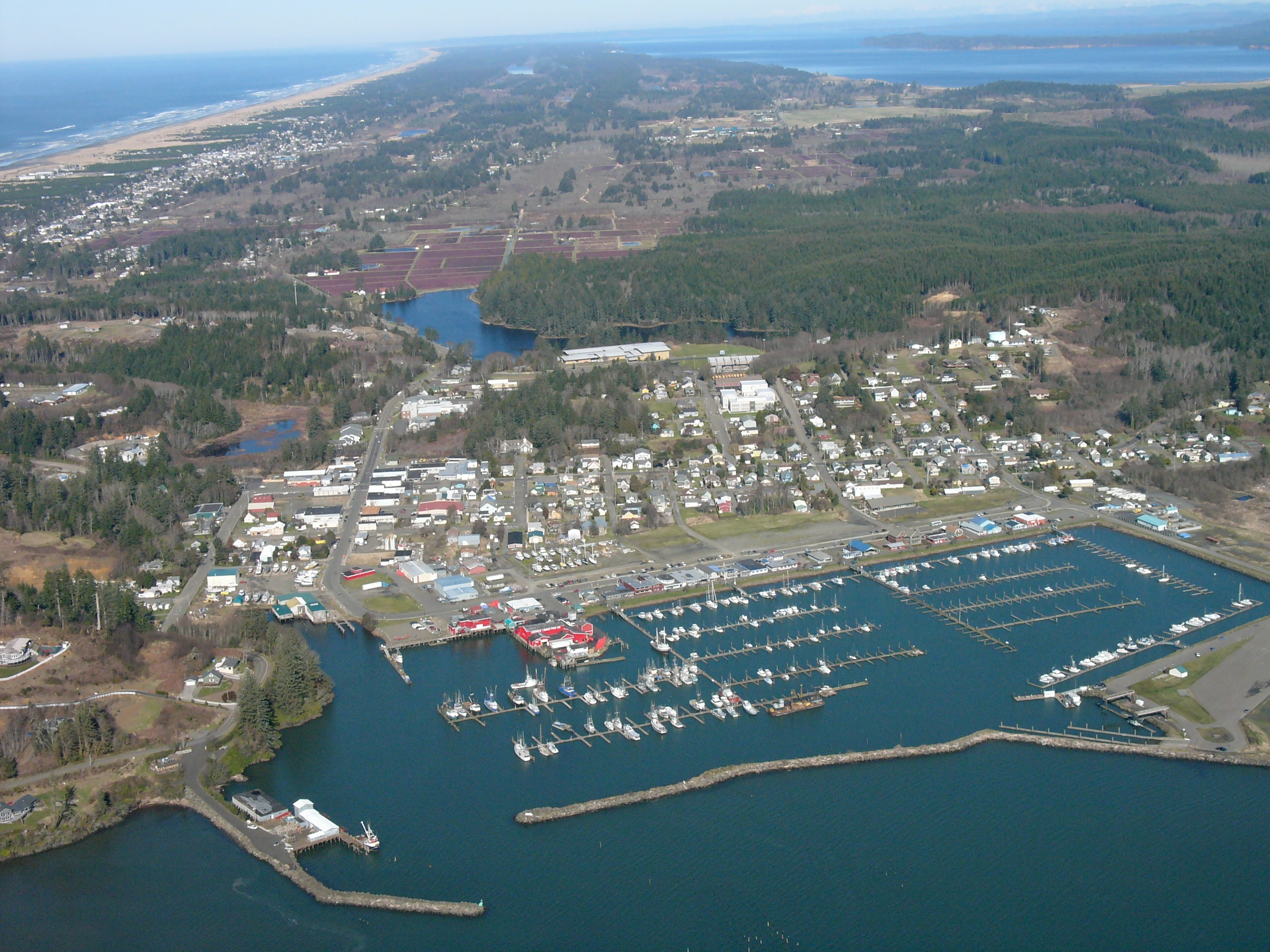
- Aerial view of Ilwaco and Ilwaco Harbor, 2008

- Location of Ilwaco, Washington
- Coordinates: 46°17′55″N 124°01′07″W
- Country: United States
- State: (Washington (state)) Washington
- County: Pacific

Government
  - Type: Mayor–council
  - Mayor: Mike Cassinelli

Area
  - Total: 5.78 sq mi (14.97 km^{2})
  - Land: 2.07 sq mi (5.35 km^{2})
  - Water: 3.71 sq mi (9.61 km^{2})
- Elevation: 0 ft (0 m)

Population (2020)
  - Total: 1,087
  - Density: 526/sq mi (203/km^{2})
- Time zone: UTC-8 (Pacific (PST))
  - Summer (DST): UTC-7 (PDT)
- ZIP Code: 98624
- Area code(s): 360, 564
- FIPS code: 53-33000
- GNIS feature ID: 2410095
- Website: City of Ilwaco

Ilwaco (/ɪlˈwɑːkoʊ/ il-WAH-koh) is a city in Pacific County, Washington, United States. The population was 1,087 at the 2020 census. Founded in 1890, the city was home to the Ilwaco Railway and Navigation Company along the Long Beach Peninsula, with its core economy based on logging and timber rafting. The city is located on the southern edge of the Long Beach Peninsula, on Baker Bay on the north side of the Columbia River where it meets the Pacific Ocean. It is near the city of Astoria, Oregon, which lies to the southeast on the southern bank of the Columbia.

== History ==
Ilwaco, initially given the name Unity, was first settled by Henry Feister in 1851, and was named for the Lower Chinook leader Elwahko Jim, whose indigenous name was [ʔɪlwəkʷo], the son in law of Chief Comcomly. Ilwaco was officially incorporated on December 16, 1890. A narrow gauge railway, Ilwaco Railway and Navigation Company, ran for over thirty years. Similarly to the nearby city of Astoria, Oregon, and the surrounding communities, Ilwaco historically had a significant population of Finnish immigrants.

The railroad ran north up First Street in Ilwaco. A published photo shows the railroad's Ilwaco facilities, including a gallows turntable and elevated watering trough, were located on the southwest corner of the intersection of First and Spruce streets. The depot was built nearby on Spruce Street. A siding was built for the Ilwaco Mill and Lumber Company. A published photo shows the passenger depot on the west side of First Street, at a point 14.8 miles (23.8 km) from the Ilwaco Depot to Nahcotta. The train ran out on the dock in Ilwaco. Floating logs were stored behind log booms on the west side of the Ilwaco dock. At some point after 1890, First Street had been covered with wooden planks, and remained so until 1916, when it was paved over. By 1915, a published photo shows more businesses along First Street.

A fire at the Ilwaco Landing at the Port of Ilwaco began on the morning of January 22, 2024 which engulfed a dock, destroyed a receiving facility, and burned an estimated 600 crab pots. The conflagration began a few days before the beginning of the fishing season.

== Geography ==
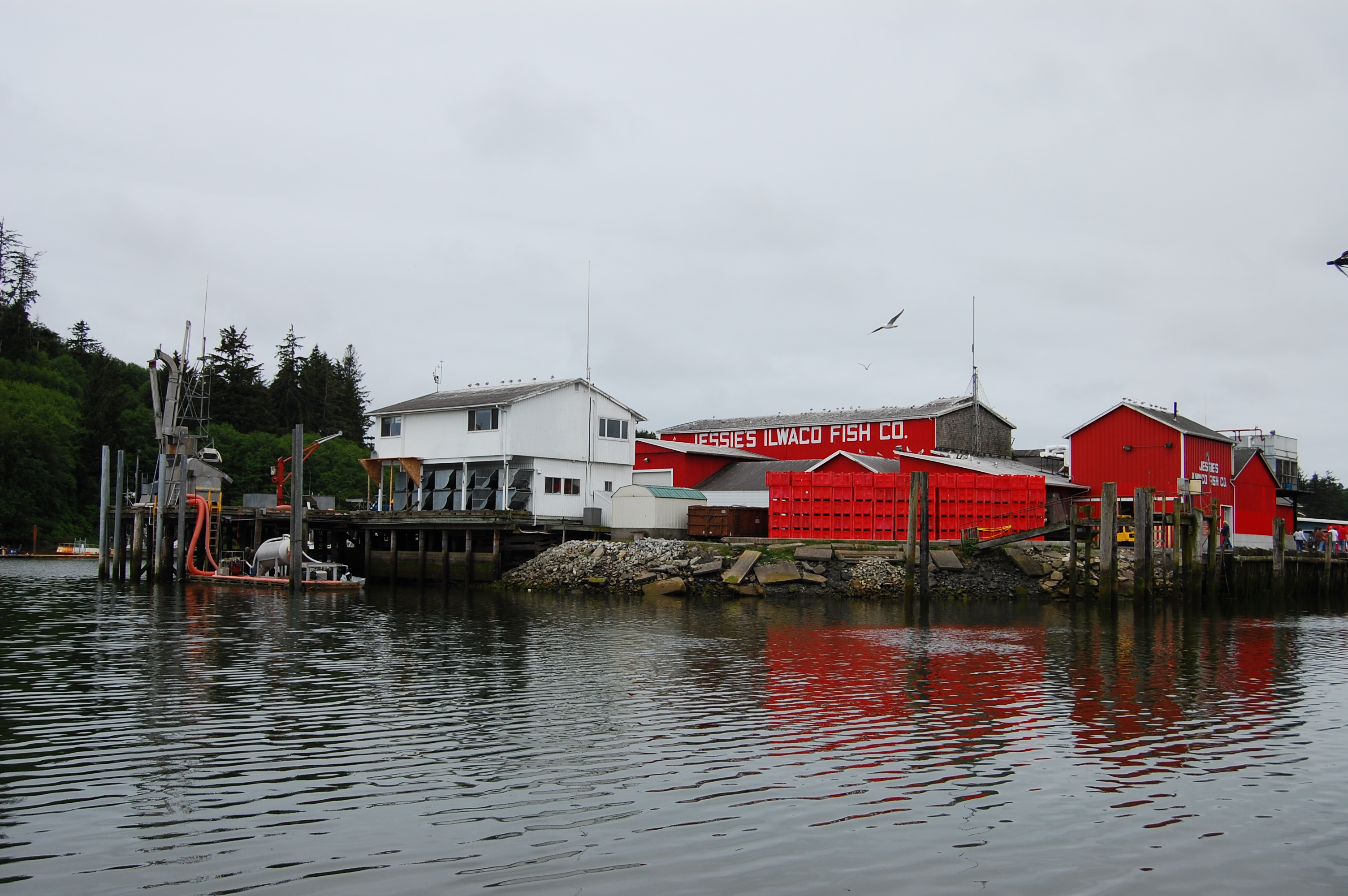
Fish plant at Ilwaco Harbor

Ilwaco is located on the Long Beach Peninsula. and according to the United States Census Bureau, the city has a total area of 5.93 square miles (15.36 km^{2}), of which 2.10 square miles (5.44 km^{2}) is land and 3.83 square miles (9.92 km^{2}) is water.

=== Climate ===
This region experiences warm (but not hot), long, and somewhat dry summers, with no average monthly temperatures above 71.6 °F. Snow is uncommon, even in winter. According to the Köppen Climate Classification system, Ilwaco has a cool oceanic climate, bordering very closely on a warm-summer Mediterranean climate, abbreviated "Cfb" and "Csb" on climate maps.

Climate data for Ilwaco, Washington
Month	Jan	Feb	Mar	Apr	May	Jun	Jul	Aug	Sep	Oct	Nov	Dec	Year
Record high °F (°C)	65 (18)	75 (24)	79 (26)	86 (30)	94 (34)	97 (36)	100 (38)	102 (39)	99 (37)	88 (31)	69 (21)	63 (17)	102 (39)
Mean daily maximum °F (°C)	48.9 (9.4)	50.7 (10.4)	53.3 (11.8)	56.3 (13.5)	60.2 (15.7)	63.5 (17.5)	67.1 (19.5)	68.0 (20.0)	67.2 (19.6)	60.1 (15.6)	52.3 (11.3)	47.9 (8.8)	58.0 (14.4)
Mean daily minimum °F (°C)	37.4 (3.0)	36.9 (2.7)	38.7 (3.7)	40.7 (4.8)	45.4 (7.4)	49.5 (9.7)	52.7 (11.5)	52.6 (11.4)	48.8 (9.3)	44.0 (6.7)	39.9 (4.4)	36.7 (2.6)	43.6 (6.4)
Record low °F (°C)	5 (−15)	5 (−15)	20 (−7)	24 (−4)	28 (−2)	34 (1)	37 (3)	35 (2)	29 (−2)	17 (−8)	9 (−13)	3 (−16)	3 (−16)
Average precipitation inches (mm)	11.65 (296)	9.89 (251)	9.01 (229)	5.92 (150)	3.86 (98)	3.05 (77)	1.64 (42)	1.68 (43)	3.33 (85)	6.83 (173)	11.83 (300)	12.49 (317)	81.18 (2,061)
Average snowfall inches (cm)	0.4 (1.0)	0.6 (1.5)	0 (0)	0 (0)	0 (0)	0 (0)	0 (0)	0 (0)	0 (0)	0 (0)	0.2 (0.51)	0.3 (0.76)	1.5 (3.8)

== Demographics ==
Historical population
Census	Pop.	Note	%±
1880	85		—
1890	517		508.2%
1900	584		13.0%
1910	664		13.7%
1920	787		18.5%
1930	750		−4.7%
1940	656		−12.5%
1950	628		−4.3%
1960	518		−17.5%
1970	506		−2.3%
1980	604		19.4%
1990	815		34.9%
2000	950		16.6%
2010	936		−1.5%
2020	1,087		16.1%
U.S. Decennial Census; 2020 Census

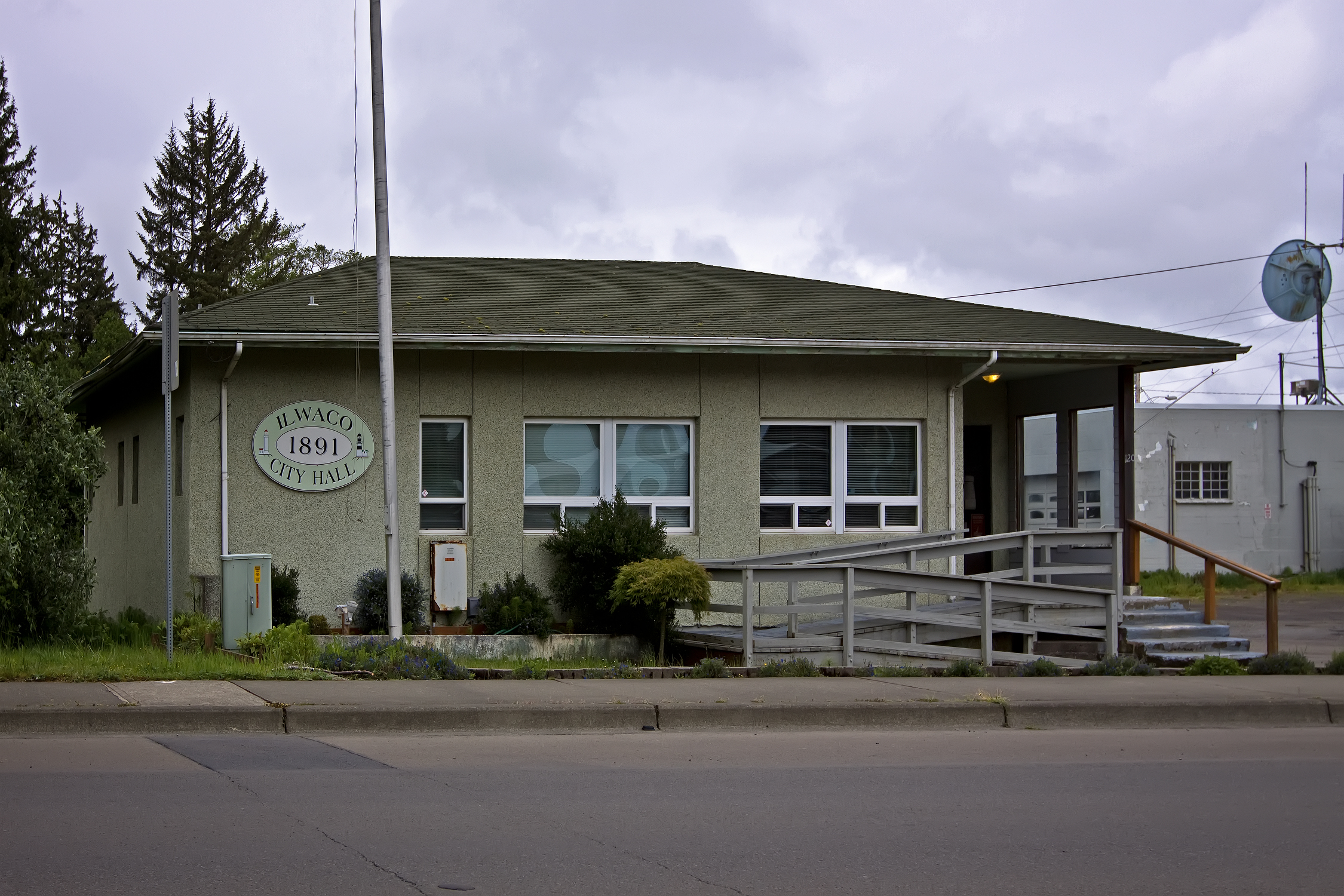
Ilwaco City Hall

=== 2020 census ===
As of the 2020 census, Ilwaco had a population of 1,087. The median age was 50.0 years, with 19.2% of residents under the age of 18 and 26.8% of residents 65 years of age or older. For every 100 females there were 96.2 males, and for every 100 females age 18 and over there were 94.2 males.

60.1% of residents lived in urban areas, while 39.9% lived in rural areas.

There were 476 households in Ilwaco, of which 26.9% had children under the age of 18 living in them. Of all households, 43.9% were married-couple households, 17.2% were households with a male householder and no spouse or partner present, and 30.3% were households with a female householder and no spouse or partner present. About 30.0% of all households were made up of individuals and 15.5% had someone living alone who was 65 years of age or older.

There were 615 housing units, of which 22.6% were vacant. The homeowner vacancy rate was 1.9% and the rental vacancy rate was 5.0%.

Racial composition as of the 2020 census
Race	Number	Percent
White	913	84.0%
Black or African American	5	0.5%
American Indian and Alaska Native	21	1.9%
Asian	10	0.9%
Native Hawaiian and Other Pacific Islander	2	0.2%
Some other race	36	3.3%
Two or more races	100	9.2%
Hispanic or Latino (of any race)	85	7.8%

=== 2010 census ===
As of the 2010 census, there were 936 people, 443 households, and 257 families living in the city. The population density was 445.7 inhabitants per square mile (172.1/km^{2}). There were 567 housing units at an average density of 270.0 per square mile (104.2/km^{2}). The racial makeup of the city was 89.9% White, 0.3% African American, 2.1% Native American, 0.5% Asian, 3.6% from other races, and 3.5% from two or more races. Hispanic or Latino of any race were 5.7% of the population.

There were 443 households, of which 21.2% had children under the age of 18 living with them, 46.7% were married couples living together, 8.4% had a female householder with no husband present, 2.9% had a male householder with no wife present, and 42.0% were non-families. 35.7% of all households were made up of individuals, and 13.7% had someone living alone who was 65 years of age or older. The average household size was 2.11 and the average family size was 2.68.

The median age in the city was 50.2 years. 16.7% of residents were under the age of 18; 5.2% were between the ages of 18 and 24; 21.2% were from 25 to 44; 35.3% were from 45 to 64; and 21.6% were 65 years of age or older. The gender makeup of the city was 51.5% male and 48.5% female.

=== 2000 census ===
As of the 2000 census, there were 950 people, 416 households, and 260 families living in the city. The population density was 461.5 people per square mile (178.1/km^{2}). There were 524 housing units at an average density of 254.6 per square mile (98.2/km^{2}). The racial makeup of the city was 92.84% White, 0.53% African American, 1.37% Native American, 0.42% Asian, 0.11% Pacific Islander, 1.79% from other races, and 2.95% from two or more races. Hispanic or Latino of any race were 5.26% of the population. 15.9% were of German, 13.6% Finnish, 10.1% English, 5.8% American, 5.2% Swedish and 5.1% Norwegian ancestry according to Census 2000.

There were 416 households, out of which 27.2% had children under the age of 18 living with them, 52.4% were married couples living together, 8.7% had a female householder with no husband present, and 37.5% were non-families. 33.4% of all households were made up of individuals, and 16.6% had someone living alone who was 65 years of age or older. The average household size was 2.28 and the average family size was 2.92.

In the city, the population was spread out, with 24.2% under the age of 18, 4.9% from 18 to 24, 23.6% from 25 to 44, 27.3% from 45 to 64, and 20.0% who were 65 years of age or older. The median age was 43 years. For every 100 females, there were 90.4 males. For every 100 females age 18 and over, there were 83.2 males.

The median income for a household in the city was $29,632, and the median income for a family was $34,934. Males had a median income of $29,821 versus $21,442 for females. The per capita income for the city was $16,138. About 10.3% of families and 16.3% of the population were below the poverty line, including 21.1% of those under age 18 and 16.3% of those age 65 or over.

== Arts and culture ==
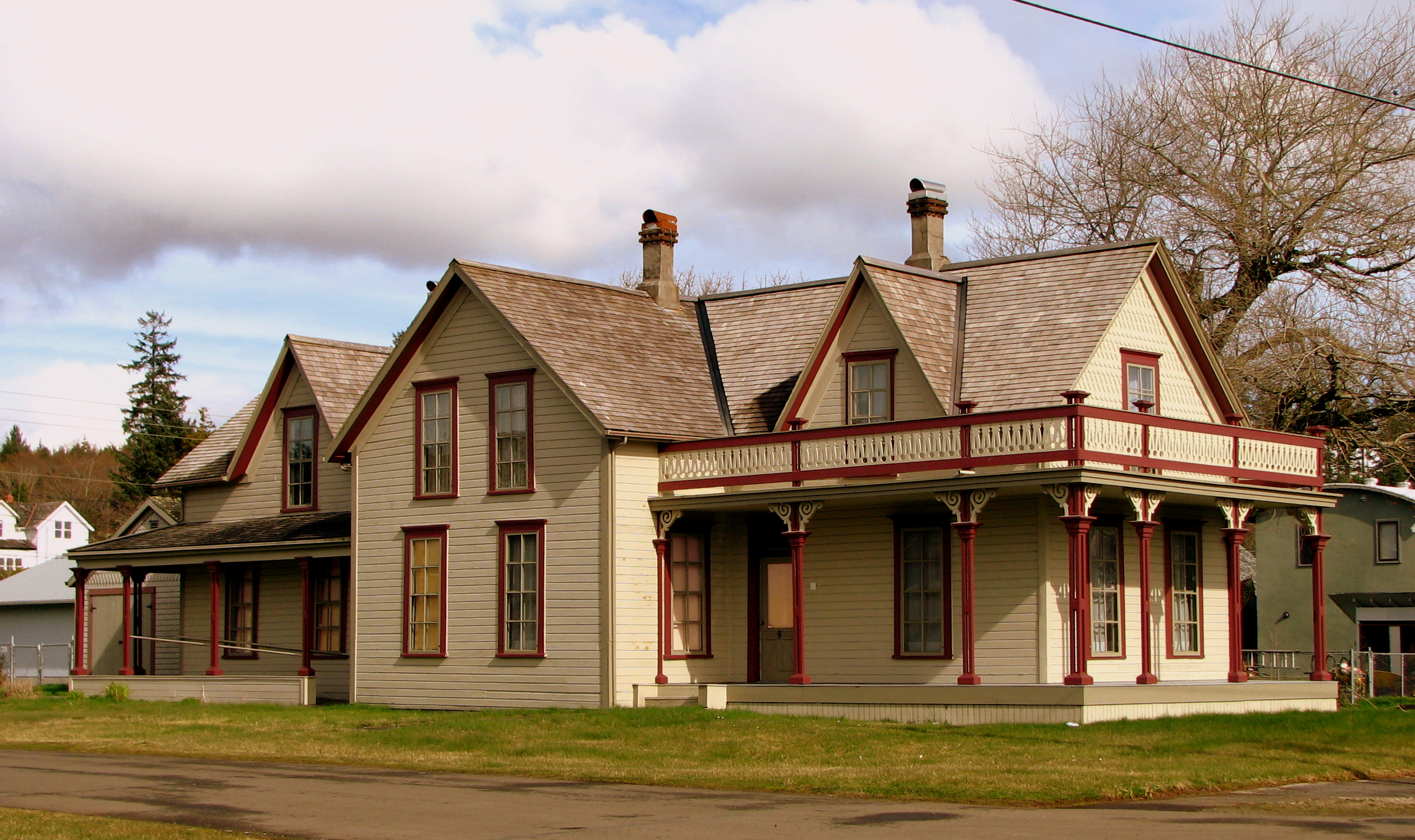
NRHP-listed Colbert House, Ilwaco

=== Historic buildings and sites ===
Ilwaco is home to two locations listed on National Register of Historic Places, the public recreation area of Cape Disappointment State Park, and the Colbert House, also listed as a Washington State Parks Heritage Site.

The Ilwaco freight depot survived to modern times and has been relocated to become part of the Columbia Pacific Heritage Museum.

== Economy ==
Ilwaco's early economy was based on the extraction of natural resources, such as timber production, eventually building up as a sawmill and fishing community known for large seafood catches. One fish processing business, in 2023, accounted for 10% of the state's non-treaty commercial harvest, but the 2024 fire at the port halved overall production in the community, leaving the city with one operational receiving facility.

In addition to the city's logging and fishing industry, Ilwaco has a history as a cranberry producer, with cranberry bogs located immediately north of its downtown.

== Works cited ==
- Feagans, Raymond (1972). The Railroad that Ran by the Tide: Ilwaco Railroad & Navigation Co. of the State of Washington. Howell-North Books. ISBN 978-0-831-07094-6.
