= Naselle River =

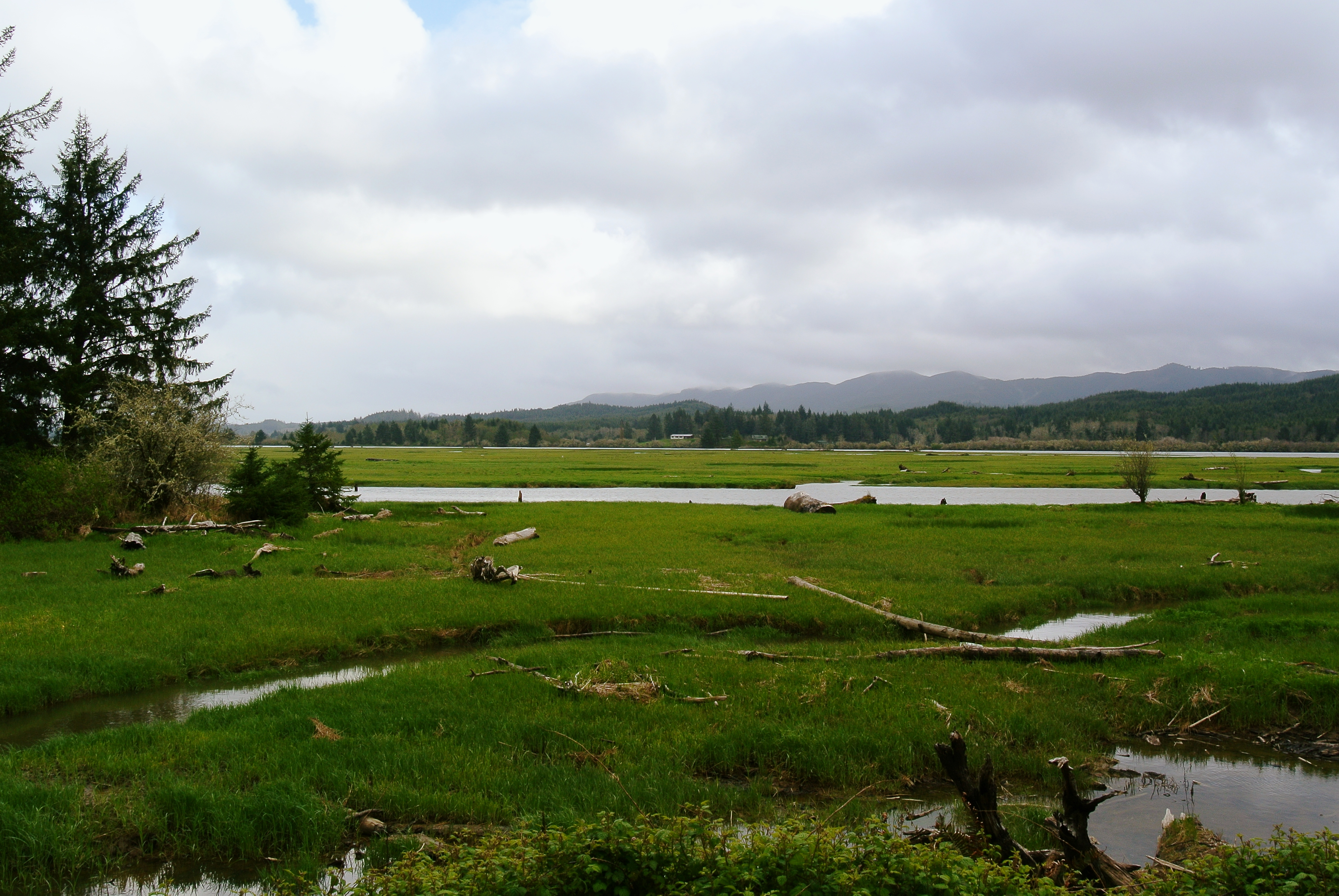
- Naselle River as seen from US 101, looking south, a few miles northwest of Naselle

- Location of the mouth of the Naselle River in Washington

Location
- Country: United States
- State: Washington
- County: Pacific, Wahkiakum

Physical characteristics
- Source
  - location: Willapa Hills
  - coordinates: 46°28′8″N 123°33′14″W
- Mouth: Chelto Harbor
  - location: Willapa Bay
  - coordinates: 46°27′54″N 123°56′24″W
- Discharge
  - location: river mile 17.4 near Naselle, WA
  - average: 425 cu ft/s (12.0 m^{3}/s)
  - minimum: 18 cu ft/s (0.51 m^{3}/s)
  - maximum: 10,400 cu ft/s (290 m^{3}/s)

The Naselle River is a river in the U.S. state of Washington.

== Course ==
The Naselle River originates in the Willapa Hills and flows generally west, passing the community of Naselle before emptying into the southern part of Willapa Bay.

Tributaries of the Naselle include, from source to mouth, Alder Creek, North Fork Naselle River, Cedar Creek, Brock Creek, Salmon Creek, Lane Creek, O'Conner Creek, South Naselle River, Johnson Creek, Dell Creek, Petes Creek, Holm Creek, Smith Creek, and Ellsworth Creek. The community of Naselle is located near the confluence of the Naselle and South Naselle Rivers. The broad tidal mouth of the Naselle River is known as Chelto Harbor. The Naselle River was used in a book called our Only May Amelia by Jennifer L. Holm.

== History ==
The river's name has been spelled Nasel and Nasal. An early settler along the river called it the Kenebec. According to Edmond S. Meany the name comes from the Nisal Indians, a Chinookan tribe formerly residing on the river.

== Popular culture ==
The book Our Only May Amelia by Jennifer L. Holm is about a Finnish family who settled along the Nasel River.

== See also ==
- List of rivers of Washington (state)
