= Babymouse =

Graphic novel series by Matthew Holm and Jennifer L. Holm

- Cover art of the first edition of the first entry, Babymouse: Queen of the World!
- Author: Jennifer L. Holm
- Illustrator: Matthew Holm
- Country: United States
- Language: English
- Genre: Children's literature; Graphic novel; Comedy
- Publisher: Random House
- Published: 2005 - 2016 (main series); 2017 - 2021 (Tales from the Locker); 2022 - present (The BIG Adventures of BabyMouse)
- Media type: Print (hardback and paperback)
- No. of books: 20 (main series); 7 (Tales from the Locker); 2 (The BIG Adventures of BabyMouse)

Babymouse is an American children's graphic novel series written by Jennifer L. Holm and illustrated by Matthew Holm. The series follows the titular anthropomorphic mouse, Babymouse, as she navigates the hardships of elementary school.

As of 2024, the main series consists of twenty entries, as well as five entries in the spinoff series Tales From The Locker, which follows Babymouse as she enters middle school, and The BIG Adventures of BabyMouse, another spinoff series featuring full-color print and a larger page size compared to the previous entries. Additionally, a picture book titled Little Babymouse and the Christmas Cupcakes, which was also the first entry in the series to feature full-color print, is aimed at younger readers. Squish is a spinoff series featuring Babymouse's science fair project, an anthropomorphic amoeba, which was adapted into the animated series of the same name.

Babymouse has sold over three million copies, receiving praise from critics and readers alike for its humour and visual style.

== Background ==
The first entry in the Babymouse series was finished in 2001, illustrated by Matthew Holm and written by his sister, Jennifer L. Holm. The book was not picked up by publishers for almost two years due to a lack of interest in the character. Eventually, the manuscript was sold to Random House in 2003, and the book was published in 2005.

The initial idea for Babymouse was conceived when Jennifer was having a "typical Babymouse kind of day". While sitting in her kitchen, the image of a grumpy mouse with big whiskers and hands on her hips appeared in Jennifer's mind, leading her to scribble it onto a napkin. When she saw her brother again, she showed him the drawing and they decided to create a book series together using the character.

The reason they decided on a graphic novel format was because they believed comic books had shifted to an adult audience, and they wanted to create a comic book that would become popular with children that featured an easily relatable character. The series is aimed at girls because as a child, Jennifer felt that comic books were mostly aimed at a male audience and she couldn't relate to the characters.

In 2010, a Babymouse animated series was reportedly in the works, but never released.

== Books ==
1. Queen of the World! (2005)
2. Our Hero (2005)
3. Beach Babe (2006)
4. Rock Star (2006)
5. Heartbreaker (2006)
6. Camp Babymouse (2007)
7. Skater Girl (2007)
8. Puppy Love (2007)
9. Monster Mash (2008)
10. Babymouse: The Musical (2009)
11. Dragonslayer (2009)
12. Babymouse Burns Rubber (2010)
13. Cupcake Tycoon (2010)
14. Mad Scientist (2011)
15. A Very Babymouse Christmas (2011)
16. Babymouse for President (2012)
17. Extreme Babymouse (2013)
18. Happy Birthday, Babymouse (2014)
19. Bad Babysitter (2015)
20. Babymouse Goes for the Gold (2016)

=== Tales From The Locker ===
1. Lights, Camera, Middle School! (2017)
2. Miss Communication (2018)
3. School-Tripped (2019)
4. Curtain Call (2020)
5. Whisker Wizard (2021)

=== The BIG Adventures of BabyMouse ===
1. Once Upon a Messy Whisker (2022)
2. Besties! (2023)

=== Other books ===
- Babymouse Collection Books 1-13 (2010)
- Little Babymouse and the Christmas Cupcakes (2016)

== Characters ==
- Babymouse is the eponymous protagonist of the series. She has an active imagination and prefers to spend her time absorbed in books. Messy and disorganized, she is often late for class.
- Narrator serves as the series' narrator who sardonically comments on Babymouse's life and regularly interacts with her.
- Locker is a sentient school locker, often eating Babymouse's homework or teasing her.
- Felicia Furrypaws is the main antagonist of the series. She is a cat who is popular yet rude, egocentric, and manipulative.
- Wilson Weasel is a weasel and Babymouse's long-time best friend since kindergarten.
- Squeak is Babymouse's pesky younger brother, who is also a mouse.
- Georgie is a giraffe and friend of Babymouse.
- Penny is a poodle who loves fashion.
- Duckie is a duck who is kind and always on Babymouse's side.

== Reception ==
=== Awards and honors ===
Year	Title	Award	Category	Result	Ref.
2006	Babymouse: Queen of the World!	ALA Notable Children's Book Award	Middle Readers	Won	
2006	Babymouse: Beach Babe	Cybils Award	Graphic novel, elementary and middle grade	Nominated	
2006	Babymouse: Beach Babe	Gryphon Award	Honor Books	Nominated	
2007	Camp Babymouse	Cybils Award	Graphic novel, elementary and middle grade	Nominated	
2010	Babymouse: The Musical	Lulu Award	Leah Adezio Award for Best Kid-Friendly Work	Nominated	
2010	Babymouse: Dragonslayer	Lulu Award	Leah Adezio Award for Best Kid-Friendly Work	Nominated	
2013	Babymouse for President	2013 Eisner Award	Best Publication for Early Readers	Won	
2015	Happy Birthday, Babymouse	Children's Choice Book Award	Third to Fourth Grade Book of The Year	Nominated	
