= Naselle, Washington =

Naselle
- Census-designated place
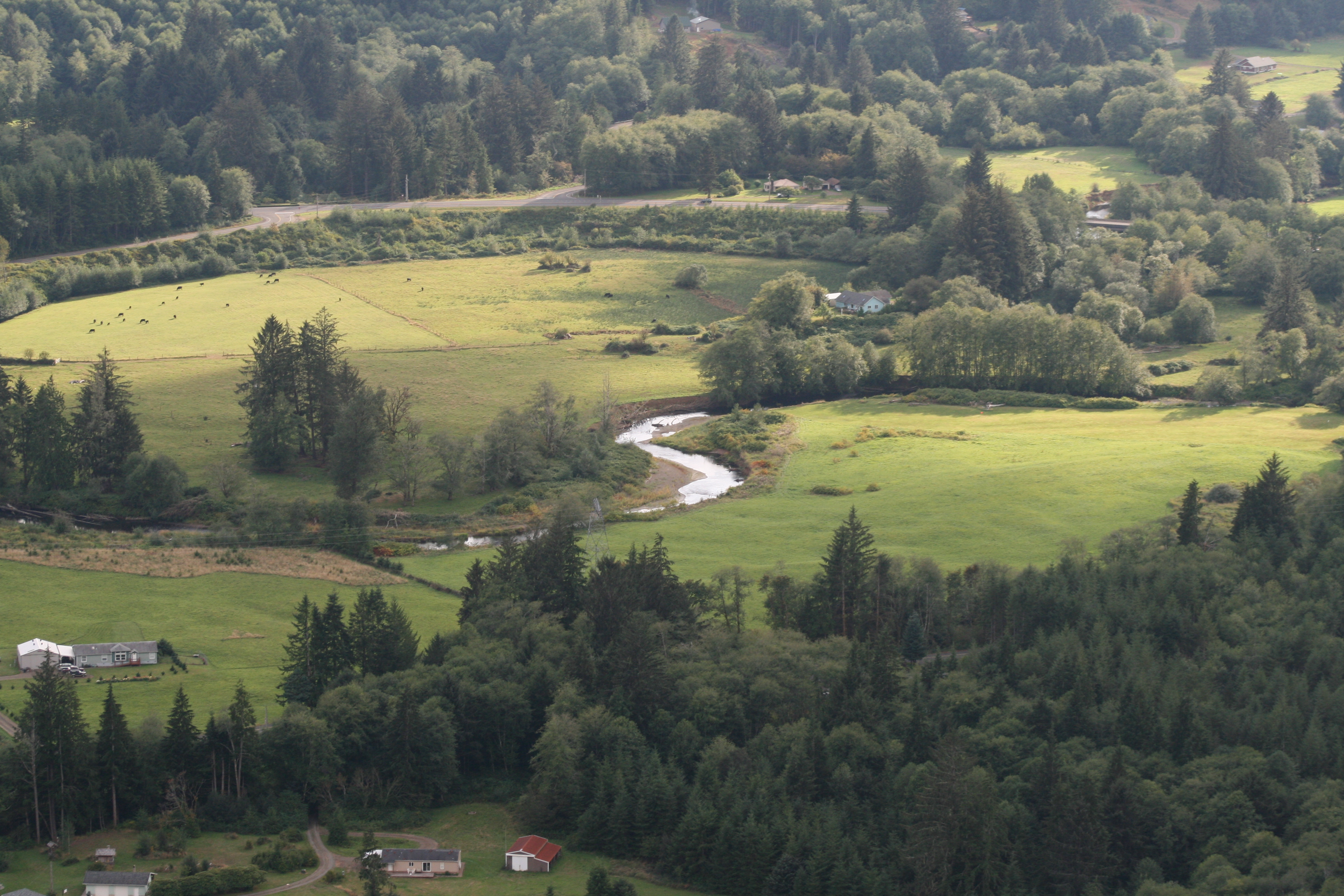
- Naselle Valley and State Route 4

- Location of Naselle, Washington
- Coordinates: 46°22′26″N 123°47′47″W
- Country: United States
- State: Washington
- County: Pacific

Area
  - Total: 2.3 sq mi (5.9 km^{2})
  - Land: 2.3 sq mi (5.9 km^{2})
  - Water: 0 sq mi (0.0 km^{2})
- Elevation: 30 ft (9.1 m)

Population (2020)
  - Total: 421
  - Density: 180/sq mi (71/km^{2})
- Time zone: UTC-8 (Pacific (PST))
  - Summer (DST): UTC-7 (PDT)
- ZIP Code: 98638
- Area code(s): 360, 564
- FIPS code: 53-48015
- GNIS feature ID: 2408903

Naselle is a census-designated place (CDP) in Pacific County, Washington, United States located about 23 miles (37 km) from the mouth of the Columbia River. The population was 421 at the 2020 census. The valley's Naselle River (Note: The river's name has also been spelled Nasel and Nasal; an early settler along the river called it the Kenebec.) flows west into nearby Willapa Bay and then into the Pacific Ocean. Close about the town lie the evergreen-covered Willapa Hills. The name comes from the Nisal Indians, a Chinookan tribe formerly residing on the river.

== History ==
The community first flourished as a logging town founded by Austin Dewing, and logging remains the dominant private industry. Settled primarily by Finnish and Scandinavian immigrants, the community has maintained this cultural heritage despite a declining percentage of traditional family names. Since 1982, Naselle has hosted a "Finnish-American Folk Festival" every other year, and in 2006 co-hosted, with the nearby city of Astoria, Oregon, the national festival FinnFest USA. A statue in honor of Dewing was erected in 1995 but later stolen.

== Climate ==
According to the Köppen Climate Classification system, Naselle has an Oceanic climate, abbreviated "Cfb" on climate maps.

Climate data for Naselle
Month	Jan	Feb	Mar	Apr	May	Jun	Jul	Aug	Sep	Oct	Nov	Dec	Year
Record high °F (°C)	60 (16)	59 (15)	69 (21)	74 (23)	86 (30)	93 (34)	93 (34)	92 (33)	91 (33)	87 (31)	62 (17)	52 (11)	93 (34)
Mean daily maximum °F (°C)	48.7 (9.3)	51.0 (10.6)	55.0 (12.8)	58.8 (14.9)	63.8 (17.7)	67.2 (19.6)	72.1 (22.3)	74.3 (23.5)	72.4 (22.4)	63.2 (17.3)	54.0 (12.2)	47.1 (8.4)	60.6 (15.9)
Mean daily minimum °F (°C)	34.0 (1.1)	33.2 (0.7)	35.3 (1.8)	38.3 (3.5)	43.6 (6.4)	47.0 (8.3)	50.3 (10.2)	50.9 (10.5)	46.4 (8.0)	40.8 (4.9)	36.4 (2.4)	33.1 (0.6)	40.8 (4.9)
Record low °F (°C)	3 (−16)	5 (−15)	24 (−4)	28 (−2)	30 (−1)	35 (2)	40 (4)	40 (4)	38 (3)	29 (−2)	25 (−4)	22 (−6)	3 (−16)
Average precipitation inches (mm)	17.77 (451)	11.59 (294)	12.49 (317)	8.70 (221)	4.65 (118)	3.63 (92)	1.20 (30)	1.87 (47)	4.27 (108)	10.70 (272)	17.07 (434)	18.27 (464)	112.21 (2,848)
Average snowfall inches (cm)	1.0 (2.5)	0.3 (0.76)	0.1 (0.25)	0 (0)	0 (0)	0 (0)	0 (0)	0 (0)	0 (0)	0 (0)	0 (0)	0.3 (0.76)	1.7 (4.27)
Average precipitation days (≥ 0.01 inch)	22.3	19.0	22.1	20.0	16.0	14.2	7.6	7.1	10.9	17.3	21.9	22.7	201.1

== Demographics ==
Historical population
Census	Pop.	Note	%±
2000	377		—
2010	419		11.1%
2020	421		0.5%
U.S. Decennial Census; 1990 2000 2010 2020

Naselle first appeared as a census designated place in the 2000 U.S. census.

=== Racial and ethnic composition ===
Naselle CDP, Washington – Racial and ethnic composition Note: the US Census treats Hispanic/Latino as an ethnic category. This table excludes Latinos from the racial categories and assigns them to a separate category. Hispanics/Latinos may be of any race.
Race / Ethnicity (NH = Non-Hispanic)	Pop 2000	Pop 2010	Pop 2020	% 2000	% 2010	% 2020
White alone (NH)	348	350	343	92.31%	83.53%	81.47%
Black or African American alone (NH)	0	1	0	0.00%	0.24%	0.00%
Native American or Alaska Native alone (NH)	8	14	3	2.12%	3.34%	0.71%
Asian alone (NH)	2	8	8	0.53%	1.91%	1.90%
Native Hawaiian or Pacific Islander alone (NH)	0	2	0	0.00%	0.48%	0.00%
Other race alone (NH)	0	0	0	0.00%	0.00%	0.00%
Mixed race or Multiracial (NH)	17	21	34	4.51%	5.01%	8.08%
Hispanic or Latino (any race)	2	23	33	0.53%	5.49%	7.84%
Total	377	419	421	100.00%	100.00%	100.00%

=== 2000 census ===
As of the census of 2000, there were 377 people, 160 households, and 110 families residing in the CDP. The population density was 164.6 people per square mile (63.6/km^{2}). There were 184 housing units at an average density of 80.3/sq mi (31.0/km^{2}). The racial makeup of the CDP was 92.57% White, 0.27% African American, 2.12% Native American, 0.53% Asian, and 4.51% from two or more races. Hispanic or Latino of any race were 0.53% of the population. 33.2% were of Finnish, 10.0% German, 7.9% Irish and 7.5% American ancestry according to Census 2000.

There were 160 households, out of which 31.3% had children under the age of 18 living with them, 59.4% were married couples living together, 6.3% had a female householder with no husband present, and 31.3% were non-families. 25.0% of all households were made up of individuals, and 17.5% had someone living alone who was 65 years of age or older. The average household size was 2.36 and the average family size was 2.85.

In the CDP, the population was spread out, with 23.3% under the age of 18, 5.0% from 18 to 24, 22.5% from 25 to 44, 26.5% from 45 to 64, and 22.5% who were 65 years of age or older. The median age was 44 years. For every 100 females, there were 95.3 males. For every 100 females age 18 and over, there were 90.1 males.

The median income for a household in the CDP was $35,769, and the median income for a family was $40,250. Males had a median income of $36,875 versus $18,125 for females. The per capita income for the CDP was $17,714. About 4.0% of families and 4.7% of the population were below the poverty line, including 7.5% of those under age 18 and 2.1% of those age 65 or over.

== Arts and culture ==
Jennifer L. Holm's Newbery Honor-winning novel Our Only May Amelia is set in pioneer Naselle, then spelled "Nasel", and is based on Holm family documents of life as a Finnish-American frontier family.

== Notable people ==
- Wilho Saari, kantele, performer and teacher
- Tobi Vail, independent musician, music critic and feminist
- Oscar Wirkkala, logger and inventor
- Rex Ziak, historian
- Austin Dewing, Founder and inventor

== See also ==
- Willapa Bay
- Steamboats of Willapa Bay
