= Squish (TV series) =

French-Spanish animated series

- Genre: Comedy
- Created by: John Derevlany
- Based on: Squish by Jennifer L. Holm & Matthew Holm
- Developed by: John Derevlany; David Michel
- Starring: Cory Doran; Brandon McGibbon; Krystal Meadows; John Stocker; Robert Tinkler
- Countries of origin: France; Spain
- Original language: English
- No. of seasons: 1
- No. of episodes: 52

Production
- Executive producer: John Derevlany
- Producers: Zoe Z. Carrera Allaix; Cecile Lauritano; David Michel
- Running time: 11 minutes
- Production companies: Cottonwood Media; Planeta Junior

Original release
- Network: Gulli; Canal J
- Release: September 1, 2019 – February 12, 2020

Squish is a French-Spanish animated television series created by John Derevlany and produced by Cottonwood Media and Planeta Junior in association with Gulli and Canal J. The series is based on the graphic novels of the same name created by Jennifer L. Holm and Matthew Holm. The series had 52 episodes, each of 11 minutes, in its first season and was released on HBO Max in the US, it was removed from HBO Max in August 2022.

The series became available on YouTube in January 2024.

== Plot ==
The series follows the adventures of Squish, a 12-year-old amoeba in the town of Small Pond (a town inhabited entirely by unicellular organisms) along with his friends, Pod and Peggy, as they try to navigate school and their everyday lives while learning more about unicellular organisms.

== Cast ==
Squish - Benjamin Bollen (French); Cory Doran (English). Squish is a 12-year-old comic book reading, Twinkie eating amoeba who also likes rap music. He is also obsessed with popularity and his image among his peers.

- Pod - Simon Koukissa (French); Brandon McGibbon (English). An amoeba and Squish's best friend. He is very rational and intelligent and is fond of making gadgets and solving equations and formulas.
- Peggy - Marie Nonnenmacher (French); Krystal Meadows (English). A paramecium and Squish's other best friend and enjoys spreading positivity, joy, and happiness around and making people smile. She is very optimistic and oftentimes hysterical. Since she's always so excited, she yells almost everything she says. She likes unicorns and has a pet named Fluffy.
- Squish's Dad - Xavier Fagnon (French); Cory Doran (English). He is Squish's father and he tends to be immature sometimes. However, he is a good role model and father figure despite being unemployed.
- Principal Planaria - Boris Relhinger (French); Robert Tinkler (English). A planarian and the principal of Squish's school. He tends to punish the students and send them to detention for every little offense. However, he shows love and compassion for the students from time to time.
- Mr. Rotifer - Xavier Fagnon (French); John Stocker (English). A rotifer and Squish's teacher who tends to be very boring and dull, causing his students to fall asleep as he teaches. It is revealed that he is a good dancer and lyricist.
- Vinny - Simon Koukissa (French); Robert Tinkler (English). A virus that tried to take over Squish's body. He has the unique ability to multiply himself and he can take the form of anybody he wants.
- Lynwood - Xavier Fagnon (French); Cory Doran (English). He is the school bully and he has a high interest in drama and acting and once even taught Squish how to become a great actor.
- Helen - Leopoldine Serre (French); Diane Salema (English). She is a student and is into Fashion and Cosmetics. She has two friends, Heather & Holly, who attend to her every need, and she has a romantic attraction to Gusfun.
- Shirley - Emmylou Homs (French); Krystal Meadows (English). She is Squish's classmate and can be intimidating at times, and is also into rock music. Since she is a micro shrimp, she is very short compared to her peers. Despite this, she has ways of adapting to live like a normal organism.
- Gusfun - Xavier Fagnon (French); Brandon McGibbon (English). A fungus in Squish's school who has a crush on Helen.
- Franny - Diane Salema (English). She is Pod's academic rival and tends to best him at every single intellectual field they compete. She goes to school in an "Intellectual Academy" for smart organisms. In the episode "A Bellyful Of Friendship", she develops a crush on Pod (although not knowing it is him because he hid Squish in his body, wore a fake mustache, had a fake voice, and called himself "Tod")
- Holly - Emmylou Homs (French); Bailey Stocker (English). She is one of Helen's friends who constantly caters to her every need.

== Production ==
Squish's overall production budget was around $8,500,000, with each episode costing over $163,000. It is estimated that an average 11-minute episode of Squish takes about eight months to make.

== Broadcast ==
On September 21, 2020, HBO Max announced that they picked up the exclusive rights to air the series on their streaming platform in the US. The show premiered on the platform on 8 January 2021. The show has also aired on Gulli and Canal J in France. It has also streamed in Canada on Crave and Club illico. The show has also premiered in Belgium on VRT and RTBF. It was shown in Israel on Hop TV and the Gulli international channels in Africa & Russia. The series airs in Spain on Neox, ETB 3 and À Punt, and in Korea on Tooniverse, and aired on Pop in the United Kingdom from June 6, 2022 to January 1, 2026. and is slated to premiere on CBBC and BBC iPlayer on 1st September 2026.

== Episodes ==
- 1 Vinny the Virus, French - (Vinny Le Virus)
- 2 Happiness Invasion, French - (Souriez, Vous Etes Infecté)
- 3 Escape from Detention
- 4 I Broke the Principal, French - (Quitte Ou Double)
- 5 Peggy's Personal Magnetism
- 6 Gifted & Transferred
- 7 A Very Dirty Story About Pod
- 8 A Star Is Fissioned, French - (Étoile Malgre Lui)
- 9 Ooze Crying Now
- 10 Pet Cause
- 11 Not So Ready to Rock
- 12 Peggy the Fashion Victim, French - (Peggy La Victim À La Mode)
- 13 A Very Small & Salty Tale, French - (Un Petit Salé)
- 14 Cyst Fight, French - (La Membrane Protection)
- 15 Family Tied, French - (La Plasma Au Poivre)
- 16 The Glow of Truth, French - (Le Brilliant de Vérité)
- 17 Fool's Gold, French - (L'or n'a pas odeur)
- 18 Squishleading, French - (Pom Pom Peggy)
- 19 Finding Nematode
- 20 Fun in the Sun, French - (La Video Virale)
- 21 When Single Cells Become Couples, French - (La Union Cellulaire)
- 22 Smarty Pod, French - (Fleurs De Joie)
- 23 Card Sharks, French - (Le Bosse De Cartes)
- 24 Amazing Moeba, French - (Super Squish)
- 25 Squish The Virus, French - (Squish Le Virus)
- 26 Like, Comment, Share and Subscribe, French - (Selfie Folie)
- 27 Trick of the Trichocyst, French - (Peggy Et Ses Harpoons)
- 28 Lunch with Planaria, French - (Un Repas Avec Un Planaria)
- 29 Bellyful of Friendship, French - (Une Amitié Pas Bidon)
- 30 Plankton Burger Party, French - (Plankton Burger Pour Tout Le Monde)
- 31 Emotionizer, French - (L'Emotioneuser)
- 32 Big Data Brian, French - (Le Double Vie De Rotifer)
- 33 We Can Beat Weeeee!!!, French - (Microtopia)
- 34 Fluffy's Fright, French - (La Journee De Principal)
- 35 It's My Party
- 36 Acid Friendship, French - (La Amitié Acide)
- 37 Pod Squared, French - (Mini Pod)
- 38 The Influencers, French - (La Mauvais Influence)
- 39 Out of Memory, French - (Excaliblob)
- 40 Queen P, French - (Copie Conforme)
- 41 The Sounds of Brian, French - (La Voix De Brian)
- 42 The Brother's Grin
- 43 Journey to the Center of Friendship
- 44 The Actor, French - (Un Talent Fou)
- 45 Blobs & Slippers
- 46 Coolest Kid Ever?, French - (La Plus Cool Du College)
- 47 Trend Potter, French - (Le Derniere Tendance)
- 48 Copy, Paste, Fail, French - (La Meilleure 3 Meilleure Ami)
- 49 Principal Peggy, French - (Principale Peggy)
- 50 Shopper's Revenge, French - (Les Bonne Actions)
- 51 The Luck of the Squish, French - (Squish Le Chanceux)
- 52 Love Is Not a Scientific Fact, French - (Le Film D'Horreur)
