= Penny from Heaven =

2006 children's novel by Jennifer L. Holm

- First edition
- Author: Jennifer L. Holm
- Cover artist: Jamie Grill
- Language: English
- Genre: Children's
- Publisher: Random House
- Publication date: 2006
- Publication place: United States
- Media type: Print (chapbook)
- Pages: 274 pp
- ISBN: 978-0-375-83689-3

Penny from Heaven (2006) is a children's novel that was named a Newbery Honor book in 2007. It was written by Jennifer L. Holm, the author of another Newbery Honor book, Our Only May Amelia. It was first published by Random House.

== Plot ==
Penny from Heaven is the story of an eleven-year-old-girl named Barbara "Penny" Falucci. She believes that people call her Penny because her father, Alfred Falucci, loved the Bing Crosby song "Pennies from Heaven." After her father's death, Penny lives with her mother, Ellie, and grandparents, Me-Me and Pop-Pop. She has her old dog Scarlett O'Hara to play with, and Penny also loves to spend time with her father's Italian family.

Her father was the oldest son of her grandmother Nonny, and the only one of her six children who was born in Italy. Penny does not know why both sides of her family are distant, or why nobody will tell her her father's real cause of death.

Penny's best friend is her cousin, Frankie, who is a troublemaker. Once, he persuaded Penny to lie to her grandparents and go to the public pool against her strict mother's wishes. She does not allow her to do anything that Penny considers "fun." Frankie also steals and is frightened that he will go to jail.

It is a surprise when her mother allows Penny to work in her Uncle Ralphie's meat store. Her favorite uncle, Dominic, works there as well. Though he is her favorite uncle, she sometimes wishes that he would be less eccentric. Many years ago, only Dominic supported Penny's parents' marriage while the rest of his family wanted him marry an Italian girl. Her uncle and her mom used to be good friends. Penny wants him to marry her mother and become her new father.

She is disappointed when she finds out her mother is dating the milkman, Mr. Mulligan. She decides to break her mother's relationship with Mr. Mulligan, and is rude during a dinner party. She asks him uncomfortable questions and compares him to her father.

One of her uncles tells Penny and Frankie that their grandfather Falucci hid money in their backyard but died before he could tell anyone his secret. They decide to find the money, and search all over the backyard. After they are unsuccessful, they want to look for the money in the basement. They wait for all the adults to leave and pretend to do laundry. Frankie finds money and is so excited. Penny is distracted and her right arm is pulled through the wringer all the way up to her armpit and is stuck, while the wringer is still going down. She wakes up in the hospital, where in a dream she hears her mother accusing her uncle Dominic for her father's death. After several weeks in the hospital, Penny still is not able to move her right arm's fingers. A doctor says that Penny's chances of remaining disabled are high.

Penny wakes up at night and heard two nurses talking about her mother. They say her father was an Italian spy and was killed by the American government. When she asks her mother about this, she starts crying. Her aunt decides to tell her the truth. When Penny was a baby, her uncle Dominic bought her father a new radio. He didn't know Italians were not allowed to have this kind of radio. After Pearl Harbor, the country went crazy and all non-citizens were considered spies. Unfortunately, her father was born in Italy and was a not U.S. citizen. He got sick in the jail and died. In the last letter he wrote, "Baby is just like a lost penny, I'll never hold again". This is the real reason why everyone calls her "Penny". She realizes why her mom said Dominic killed her husband; he had bought the radio. She wants to see him and say that it is not his fault, but he never visits her in the hospital. All she has left is her lucky bean from him.

The girl who lives with Penny in the same room asks to see her lucky bean. Penny wants to reach it, but loses her balance and the bean slides off the table. She doesn't want to drop it, and catches it with her fingers. She moves her fingers and believes it was a mystery of her lucky bean.

Penny returns home as her arm continues to heal. Her mother married Mr. Mulligan. Uncle Dominic returns and Penny forgives him for buying the radio. Penny's two families meet together for a dinner.

== Characters ==
- Barbara Ann Falucci "Penny" — age 11. A half Italian girl who loves butter pecan ice cream and the Brooklyn Dodgers baseball team.
- Ellie Falucci — age not specified. A single mother, used to be a nurse.
- Alfred Falucci — Penny's late father. Born in Italy, but lived in the United States. Worked as a journalist for an Italian newspaper.
- Dominic Falucci — a younger brother of Penny's father. He lives in the car and doesn't like to be around people. He gives a lucky bean to Penny and is her favorite uncle.
- Frankie Falucci — age 12. Penny's best friend, and her cousin. He is a troublemaker and loves to have fun. He wants to become rich and support his family.
- Genevieve Falucci "Nonny" — about 70. Penny's paternal grandmother. She wears only black clothes and loves cooking.
- Ralph Falucci — the youngest brother of Penny's father. He has a coat factory. He always gives Penny new clothes.
- Pat Mulligan — The milkman who dates Penny's mother. Before becoming a milkman, he was in the air force and was stationed in Burma during the war.
- Scarlett O'Hara — Penny's 15 year old dog that dies halfway through the book,

== Critical reception ==
Karen Coats, writing for Bulletin of the Center for Children's Books, states: "It's undeniably a nostalgic and highly personal piece, but it is readable and appealing nostalgia; Penny's family is quirky, big-hearted, and lively, and her adventures will have broad appeal for preadolescents, as well as bringing to light a largely neglected piece of American history. A family picture album and author's note follow the text." Publishers Weekly writes, "The relaxed pace picks up after an accident lands Penny in the hospital and she overhears a rumor about her father. Holm includes telling historical details, including information about WWII Italian internment camps. Readers will enjoy observing Penny's growth, how she mediates a peace among her family members and offers a glimmer of heaven". Tricia Melgaard, who reviewed the book for School Library Journal, found the plot a bit weak, but said that warmth and humor abound.

== Awards ==
- Newbery Medal Honor Book in 2007
- Rebecca Caudill Young Reader's Book Award nominee in 2009
- The New York Times children's book bestseller in 2007

== See also ==
- Children's literature
