= Rex Ziak =

American historian

- Occupations: Writer, historian, documentarian
- Known for: His studies on Lewis and Clark
- Website: http://rexziak.com/

Rex Ziak (pronounced "zeek") is an American writer, historian, tour guide, and documentarian, who lives in Naselle, Washington, United States. Known for his Lewis and Clark studies, he is the author of In Full View.

== Career ==
As a documentarian and cinematographer, his work under assignment from ABC Television received an Emmy in 1993 for cinematography in the documentary Tall Ship: High Sea Adventure. He was also involved in the filming of the 2003 Discovery Channel documentary, Marine Corps Survival School, where Ziak had to film at "high altitudes and in low temperatures" in the Sierra Nevada.

=== Lewis and Clark Studies ===
After careful study of the expedition's journals and of the geography of the Columbia River estuary, Ziak discovered the previously unknown fact that from November 7, 1805, to December 6, the Lewis and Clark expedition stayed in what is now Pacific County, along the Long Beach Peninsula. This finding took six years for Ziak to piece together, using the comments in the expedition's journals to find the locations the explorers stopped at on their trip. A controversy arose between Oregon, long considered the end of the expedition, and Washington's historians over Ziak's findings, with many historians in Washington and elsewhere supporting his discovery and many in Oregon opposing it. In 1999, soon after his announcement, Ziak and David Nicandri, director of the Washington State Historical Society, began petitioning to give the newly found ending location, a camping spot called Station Camp, National Landmark Status. In addition, that year, US Representative Brian Baird had an amendment passed that changed the "federal designation of the Lewis and CLark National Historic Trail as ending not in Oregon but in Oregon and Washington."

In 2004, Ziak testified before Congress in support of the Lewis and Clark National Historical Park. The next year he published a fold-out map and guide to the route taken by the expedition.

Ziak and his wife, Keiko, founded the OBON Society in 2015.

== Personal life ==
Ziak was awarded the Order of the Sun by the Japanese government in March 2024.

== Bibliography ==
- In Full View (A True and Accurate Account of Lewis and Clark's Arrival at the Pacific Ocean, and Their Search for a Winter Camp Along the Lower Columbia River) (Moffitt House Press, 2002)
