= The Stink Files =

First edition (publ. HarperCollins)

The Stink Files is a series of three children's mystery books by Jennifer L. Holm and Jonathan Hamel. The main character is a cat named James Edward Bristlefur aka Mr. Stink.

== Books ==
- Dossier 001: The Postman Always Brings Mice (2004) is the first book in the series. James Edward Bristlefur is a cat raised by a secret agent and is himself a secret agent. After his owner dies, James is bought by a family in New Jersey and is named Mr. Stink. James' new owner is getting bullied by a boy down the street, so James teaches him a lesson.
- Dossier 002: To Scratch a Thief (2004) is the second book in the series. James loves his new family, but a thief is near.
- Dossier 003: You Only Have Nine Lives (2005) is the third book in the series. James and his new family are going to France after James became the spokescat for a cat food business. Will he find out about his past?
