= Wilho Saari =

American musician (1932–2022)

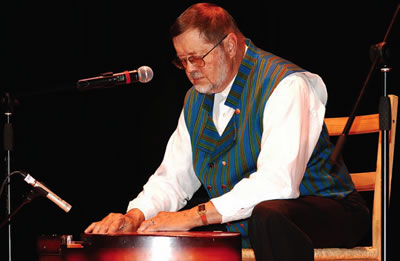
Saari performs on the kantele during the 2006 NEA National Heritage Fellows concert.

Wilho F. Saari (July 7, 1932 – January 19, 2022) was a Finnish American player of the kantele, the Finnish psaltery. Kreeta Haapasalo, a well-known kantele player in Finland in the 19th century, was his great-great-grandmother. His father, Wilho Sr., also performed the kantele in public, only in Washington, having brought a kantele with him to America in 1915.

In 2005, Washington governor Christine Gregoire awarded Saari the Governor's Heritage Award for his work popularizing and teaching the kantele. Saari is a resident of Naselle, Washington. In 2006 he was one of ten recipients of the National Endowment for the Arts (NEA) award of a National Heritage Fellowship, the country's highest honor in the folk and traditional arts.

Saari both taught and performed around the country. In Astoria, Oregon, and Naselle, Washington, he performed at FinnFest USA '06, an annual national festival, where he participated in the world premiere of a Kantele Mass composed by Jarkko Yli-Annala.

Saari was married for over 50 years to his "roadie" Kaisa, of Kuopio, Finland. They had two children. Saari also had six grandchildren. He died on January 19, 2022, at the age of 89.
