= Boston Jane =

2001 children's novel

Boston Jane: An Adventure
- First edition
- Author: Jennifer L. Holm
- Language: English
- Series: Boston Jane
- Genre: Historical novel
- Set in: Washington Territory
- Published: 2001 by HarperCollins
- Publication place: United States
- Media type: Print (paperback)
- Pages: 272 pages
- ISBN: 9780375836909
- Followed by: Boston Jane: Wilderness Days

Boston Jane: An Adventure is a 2001 children's historical novel by Jennifer L. Holm. It is followed by Boston Jane: Wilderness Days and Boston Jane: The Claim. The name is a reference to the name of the main character, Jane Peck, who is called "Boston Jane" by the Chinook. Because the first Americans associated with the Chinook were from Boston, the Chinook referred to all Americans as "Boston (Name)".

== Plot summary ==
1855, 16-year-old Jane Peck is sailing from Philadelphia to Shoalwater Bay in Washington Territory to meet William Baldt, her betrothed. She is traveling on the poorly named ship Lady Luck, accompanied only by her Irish maid Mary, who sadly dies during a storm. Also on the ship is Father Joseph, a French Catholic priest, hoping to baptize some of the Native Americans in the area, and Jehu Scudder, a sailor from Boston. The book flashes between the current time and Jane's past in Philadelphia, which shows how she turned from a wild little girl to a quiet and pious young lady.

In the flashbacks, Jane begins to attend Miss Hepplewhite's Academy for Young Ladies, where she learns "manners". While she has a hard time fitting in, eventually she excels, becoming a favorite of Miss Hepplewhite. Her widowed father, Dr. James Peck, does not take her transformation well, telling her to "speak your mind" as well as "there is nothing fashionable about crushed bones", referring to the corset which was the fashion. The flashbacks also reveal her relationship with Sally Biddle, a girl who bullied her as a child, and her relationship with William, who at the time had been studying to be a surgeon with Jane's father.

When Jane arrives at Shoalwater Bay later than expected, she finds that William has left the area, believing that she had gone back on her word, and she is alone, unchaperoned. She meets and befriends Mr. Swan, a botanist studying the flora in the area, and Mr. Russell, the settler who has been there the longest. Having no home, she must house with Mr. Russell and many other "rough" men. She also meets Chinook Chief Toke, his wife Suis, and their daughter Sootie, as well as another Chinook aptly called Handsome Jim. Jane finds herself useless, her training at the academy insufficient for the harsh living of the Washington Territory. She does not know how to cook and so is made to mend the shirts of Mr. Russell, and as she soon finds out, every other man in the area (this is because "all the boys" have been putting their shirts in her mending pile). Jane soon learns how to cook, using the book her maid Mary left behind, which is filled with recipes from her childhood, including her favorite, cherry pie, which Jane changes to salmonberry pie, having no cherries to use.

Jane has many other adventures, including fruitlessly diving into the water to find Mr. Swan's canoe, which has been lost in a storm, then replacing it by trading much of her wedding trousseau with Suis, with whom she has built a steady relationship. Mr. Swan then accepts her into his oyster business, and she names the new canoe The Brandywine after Mr. Russell's dog. Jane also attends the affair of the year, the Fourth of July party, where she once again runs into Jehu. After they dance together, he kisses her, admitting that he loves her. Despite feeling an attraction to him, Jane turns him away and runs off, falling off a cliff. She recovers, but Jehu leaves soon after.

Chief Toke, Mr. Russell, and Mr. Swan leave for Astoria, leaving Jane with the Chinooks and Father Joseph. However, soon the Chinooks develop smallpox. Jane and Father Joseph, both of whom have been vaccinated, attempt to save them, but many of them die, including Jane's friend Suis. Without hesitation, Jane dresses her in her wedding dress, assured that Suis would be the most beautiful woman in heaven. Handsome Jim, though not physically scarred, is mentally scarred, no longer a carefree young man, and he renames himself Keer-usko meaning Crooked-nose. The men return from Astoria, along with William, who is not at all overjoyed to see that his fiancé has now become as wild as before. Keer-usko tells Jane he dislikes her fiancé, saying that he is like a mouse or a flea, and though Jane protests, she too has her doubts, refusing to kiss him goodnight. Jane soon finds out that William only wanted to marry her for the land, since married men received more land then single ones. It is also revealed that William has already married a half-Makah half-white girl, but that he is ready to leave her for Jane. Jane, realizing that he never loved her and that in truth she never loved him, breaks the engagement, and William leaves. Jane decides to return to Philadelphia but changes her mind as she sees Jehu striding towards her. She is no longer Miss Jane Peck of Philadelphia, but Boston Jane of Shoalwater Bay.

== Reception ==
Kirkus Reviews referred to Boston Jane as "a good-humored, rip-roaring romantic adventure".

Multiple reviewers praised Boston Jane's characters, including the heroine, with Booklist's Kay Weisman referring to her as "intrepid" and Publishers Weekly calling her "enormously likable and irrepressible". Kirkus Reviews added that she is "original". Beyond Jane specifically, AudioFile mentioned that Holm "has an especially authentic touch with young female characters."

Weisman also discussed how Holm provides "meticulous attention to historical details (especially concerning the Chinook Indians)", as well as "a perceptive understanding of human nature".

Despite an overall positive review of the novel, Kirkus Reviews mentioned that "a couple of subplots are left hanging or seem out of place: the obvious decline in Jane’s father’s health goes unresolved, and the introduction of the ghost of Jane’s traveling companion does little to further the plot." However, they concluded that the novel provides a "highly enjoyable historical romp", despite "an unfortunately young-looking cover illustration".

Booklist also provided the audiobook narrated by Jessalyn Gilsig a starred review. AudioFile praised Gilsig's ability to "read with spirited good humor", noting that she "gives the confused teenager an endearing realness and still manages to inject everyone--from the Native American 'Handsome Jim' to the cantankerous Mr. Russell--with an authentic frontier flavor."

Publishers Weekly referred to Gilsig's performance as a "a bright, effective reading" and highlighted how she "adroitly changes tone from tentative to indignant to confident, depicting Jane's transformation from frail and ineffectual to robust and vibrant".

== Awards and honors ==
- ALA Best Book for Young Adults (2002)
- Book Sense 76 Pick
- Parent's Guide to Children's Media Award
