= Taffy (TV series) =

French animated television series

- Genre: Comedy; Slapstick
- Created by: Pierre Sissmann; Mike de Sève
- Directed by: Ahmed Guerrouache
- Voices of: Billy Bob Thompson; Tyler Bunch; Serra Hirsch; Jeffrey Hylton; Starr Busby; Vega de Seve; Dan Green; Marc Thompson; Roger Craig Smith; Lisa Ortiz; Candi Boyd
- Composers: Fabien Nataf; Alain Mouysset
- Country of origin: France
- Original languages: French; English
- No. of seasons: 2
- No. of episodes: 156

Production
- Executive producer: Helene Maret
- Producers: Pierre Sissmann; Andrew Ooi; C.J. See
- Editors: Alain Lavelle; Cristophe Giroud
- Running time: 7 minutes
- Production companies: Cyber Group Studios; Turner Broadcasting System Europe

Original release
- Network: France 4 (season 1); Gulli and Canal J (season 2)
- Release: 17 December 2018 – 7 February 2024

Taffy is a French animated television series co-created by Mike de Sève and Pierre Sissman. The series is produced by Cyber Group Studios, in co-production with Turner Broadcasting System Europe with the participation of France 4 for the first season and WarnerMedia and Gulli for the second season. The series airs on Boomerang all across Europe. In September 2019, the series was renewed for a second season. On March 30, 2022, Cyber Group Studios and Gulli renewed the series for a third season.

In July 2022, the show (along with some others) was removed from all Boomerang international channels following the Warner Bros. Discovery purge for tax write-off purposes, thus causing Season 3 to be delayed indefinitely. Cyber Group Studios instead aired most of the second season on Disney Channel in most of Europe. The remaining Season 2 episodes aired on CBBC.

== Plot ==
The series follows a stray, grey raccoon named Scraggs, who gets adopted by Mrs. Muchmore after thinking he is a cat named Taffy. Her main pet, a blue dobermann named Bentley, is determined to reveal Taffy's secret to Mrs. Muchmore, which leads to luxurious antics as both Bentley and Scraggs/Taffy attempt to outdo each other with the goal of both being to rid the property of the other one. Other characters include Mrs. Muchmore's butler, Forsythe, her lovestruck fitness trainer, Binikos, and friends – Addie, a little girl and Mrs. Muchmore's granddaughter, and Taffy's raccoon friends from the dump, Mish, Mash and (in season 2) Mush. Several other secondary and background characters appear often in the show, like Mrs. Muchmore's friends, Mrs. Highcost and Mrs. Allperfect, who are also rich ladies, and Forsythe's child genius nephew Alex, whose inventions tend to wind up occasionally being used by Scraggs/Taffy or Bentley against one another.

== Production ==
In July 2017, France Télévisions partnered up with Boomerang to begin producing a Tom and Jerry-inspired slapstick cartoon, which would premiere in the fall of 2018 with a total of 78 episodes. The show uses digital puppet animation, with stylized designs reminiscent of cartoons in the 1950s and 1990s. In September 2019, a second season was renewed, containing 78 seven-minute segments, which was set to premiere in 2020 but was delayed to 2022 on multiple Boomerang channels. In March 2022, a third season was announced. As of 2026, it is unknown whether the season will be produced, following the series being written off for taxes by Warner Bros. Discovery and the collapse of Cyber Group Studios in November 2024.

The series is animated by Toon City in the Philippines.

== Cast ==
=== French ===
- Emmanuel Garijo as Scraggs / "Taffy"
- Xavier Fagnon as Bentley
- Fily Keita as Mrs. Muchmore ("Madam Millesous")

Additional voices:

- Marc Pérez
- Marie Zidi
- Magali Rosenzweig

=== English ===
- Billy Bob Thompson as Scraggs / "Taffy"
- Tyler Bunch as Bentley
- Serra Hirsch as Mrs. Muchmore and Mish
- Jeffrey Hylton as Forsythe
- Starr Busby as Binikos
- Maggie Politi as Mrs. Highcost
- Vega de Seve as Addie
- Dan Green as Mash
- Roger Craig Smith as Mr. Fuffernin
- Natalie Hitzel as Mrs. Allperfect
- Barrett Leddy as Bradley

Additional voices:

- Dan Green as Ghost Bentley
- Marc Thompson as Ghost Taffy
- Lisa Ortiz
- Candi Boyd

== Episodes ==
=== Series overview ===
Season	Episodes		Originally released		
Season	Episodes		First released	Last released	Network
1	78		17 December 2018	14 November 2019	France 4 (France); Boomerang (worldwide)
2	78	40	1 January 2022	7 August 2022	Gulli and Canal J (France); Boomerang (worldwide)
2	78	38	13 March 2023	7 February 2024	CBBC (UK); Disney Channel and Disney XD (Europe)

=== Season 1 (2018–19) ===
The episodes are listed in the airing order of Boomerang Africa.

No. overall	No. in season	Title	Written by	Original release date	Prod. code
1	1	"Enter the Kitty" "(Le chaton laveur)"	Script by : Mike de Sève and Pierre Sissmann; Storyboarded by : Ahmed Guerrouache	17 December 2018	101
Taffy is a raccoon that lives in a city dump. He is very hungry, as he finds nothing to eat. But suddenly, the hungry raccoon smells something else which comes from a manor owned by Mrs. Muchmore and Forsythe.
2	2	"A Minor Problem" "(Identité en péril)"	Script by : Mike de Sève; Storyboarded by : Yani Ouabdesselam	17 December 2018	102
Addie, a little girl, comes to visit the manor. But when she comes to Taffy, she calls him a raccoon over and over, which makes Taffy horrified of that, so he tries several attempts to get rid of her.
3	3	"No Strings Attached" "(Sous contrôle)"	Script by : Joe Vitale; Storyboarded by : Jean-Louis Champault	18 December 2018	103
Before an inspection takes place, Mrs. Muchmore tries to give a list of tasks to Forsythe, but Bentley accidentally drops a bowling ball onto her head. Unfortunately, she becomes unconscious and Taffy and Bentley try to revive her.
4	4	"The Highest Bidder" "(Une belle histoire d'enchères)"	Script by : Javier Valdez; Storyboarded by : Nicolas Bougard	18 December 2018	104
Mrs. Muchmore buys her new spoon for her guest, which Taffy finds more allergic to Bentley. This leads Bentley to get shipped away. Taffy tries several attempts to forget about him.
5	5	"I Now Pronounce You Dog and Cat" "(Un mariage mal arrangé)"	Script by : Joe Vitale; Storyboarded by : Matthieu Pitschon	19 December 2018	105
Taffy and Bentley ruin Mrs. Muchmore's wedding video, so the two try to recreate it.
6	6	"Bentley's Girlfriend" "(L'admiratrice secrète)"	Script by : Christian West; Storyboarded by : Jean-Louis Champault	19 December 2018	106
Bentley tries to send a letter to his girlfriend and give her a love diamond.
7	7	"D.N.A. OK" "(Une question d'ADN)"	Script by : Joe Vitale; Storyboarded by : Antoine Rota	20 December 2018	107
Taffy breaks into Dr. Hurtz's science laboratory to get a test tube, with Bentley following him.
8	8	"Staycation" "(La grande évasion)"	Script by : John Reynolds; Storyboarded by : Nicolas Bougard	20 December 2018	108
Taffy and Bentley are both trapped in the manor's basement, and try to get out of it.
9	9	"Mission Mish Mash" "(Mission Mish et Mash)"	Script by : Dave Benjoya; Storyboarded by : Mickaël Mérigot	21 December 2018	109
Taffy tries to protect two raccoons named Mish and Mash, whilst being chased by three animal control officers.
10	10	"A Bentley Carol" "(Le miracle de noël)"	Script by : Jordan Gershowitz; Storyboarded by : Antoine Rota	15 January 2019	110
It's Christmas and Mrs. Muchmore decorates the manor, but Taffy gets abruptly kicked out. Then, he finds Mish and Mash, and orders both to mock Bentley. For their new plan, Mish and Mash pose as the Ghosts of Christmas Past and Present to scare Bentley, who is actually asleep.
11	11	"The Switch" "(Si j'étais toi...)"	Script by : Jordan Gershowitz; Storyboarded by : Matthieu Pitschon	24 December 2018	111
Taffy and Bentley switch their bodies and voices after lightning hits them, so the two try to get back to normal.
12	12	"Cute or Boot" "(Pour quelques nonos de plus)"	Script by : Aaron Dunn; Storyboarded by : Alexandre Petreski	24 December 2018	112
Mrs. Muchmore brings two drones to the manor, which take a photo of both Bentley and Taffy and post them on the phone online.
13	13	"License to Kale" "(Chou à volonté)"	Script by : Javier Valdez; Storyboarded by : Thierry Beurcq	25 December 2018	113
Taffy has a fear of kale.
14	14	"Cat Burglar" "(Le voleur de chat)"	Script by : John Reynolds; Storyboarded by : Mickaël Mérigot	25 December 2018	114
At night, a cat burglar comes to the manor to chase Taffy, with some help from Bentley.
15	15	"Raccoon Day" "(Un jour sans fin)"	Script by : Marine Lachenaud, Cédric Lachenaud and Alan Keane; Storyboarded by : Alexandre Petreski	26 December 2018	115
After eating a strange green banana peel, Taffy keeps permanently repeating the same day, so he tries to change his reality. Will he succeed?
16	16	"Logging Off" "(Lolcat)"	Script by : Javier Valdez; Storyboarded by : Jean-Louis Champault	26 December 2018	116
Taffy is famous on the internet, but Bentley is not.
17	17	"Smell of the Chase" "(Eau de caviar)"	Script by : Joe Vitale; Storyboarded by : Mickaël Dupre	8 April 2019	117
Bentley plots against Taffy by delivering a box of caviar bottles. But Bentley can't immediately open the bottle until the caviar soon drops on his head, which makes a smell and leads Taffy to chase Bentley.
18	18	"Showtime" "(Le concours)"	Script by : Joe Vitale; Storyboarded by : Nicolas Bougard	8 April 2019	118
Taffy joins Binikos' Show Cat Boot Camp and practices sports to make himself strong.
19	19	"Old Home Reek" "(Flagrant délire)"	Script by : Dave Benjoya; Storyboarded by : Matthieu Pitschon	9 April 2019	119
Taffy is having fun with his old friends Mish and Mash, but Bentley tries to chase them.
20	20	"Factory Flaw" "(Retour à l'envoyeur)"	Script by : Dave Benjoya; Storyboarded by : Thierry Beurcq	9 April 2019	120
While bringing a vase to the manor, Bentley gets accidentally shipped away.
21	21	"Robo-House" "(Tout un plat !)"	Script by : Joe Vitale; Storyboarded by : Jean-Louis Champault	10 April 2019	121
Taffy and Bentley try to wake Mrs. Muchmore up because the house will self-destruct.
22	22	"Whisperer to a Scream" "(Défaillance système)"	Script by : Aron Dunn; Storyboarded by : Alexandre Petreski	10 April 2019	122
When a guest arrives, Bentley and Taffy try to be more kind.
23	23	"Bentley of the Jungle" "(À l'état sauvage)"	Script by : Marine Lachenaud, Cédric Lachenaud, and Mike de Sève; Storyboarded by : Thierry Beurcq	11 April 2019	123
Bentley becomes savage.
24	24	"Out of the Woods" "(Promenons-nous dans les bois)"	Script by : Dave Benjoya; Storyboarded by : Nicolas Bougard	11 April 2019	124
Mrs. Muchmore and the gang go on a journey to the woods.
25	25	"Reach Out and Touch Someone" "(La visite)"	Script by : Joe Vitale; Storyboarded by : Antoine Rota	12 April 2019	125
Mrs. Muchmore invites her old friend Raccoon Ronald, but when he smells Taffy, he prepares for raccoon hunting season, with help from Bentley.
26	26	"The White Gloves" "(La revanche du majordome)"	Script by : Chris West; Storyboarded by : Mickaël Mérigot	12 April 2019	126
Forsythe tries to clean the manor, but Bentley and Taffy are both annoying him.
27	27	"Machine Dreams" "(Le majordome presque parfait)"	Script by : Nedra Gallegos; Storyboarded by : Matthieu Pitschon	15 April 2019	127
Forsythe buys a vacuum cleaner robot that cleans the manor. But when Taffy and Bentley changes its materials, it causes big trouble in the house.
28	28	"Taffyzilla"	Script by : Joe Vitale; Storyboarded by : Mickaël Mérigot	15 April 2019	128
Taffy gets buff after entering a machine.
29	29	"Laughy Taffy" "(Dent pour dent)"	Script by : Evan Menzel; Storyboarded by : Jean-Louis Champault	16 April 2019	129
Mrs. M brings Taffy to Dr. Hurtz the dentist, but he causes a laughing hysteria.
30	30	"Pet Therapist" "(Paroles de chat)"	Script by : Christopher Panzner; Storyboarded by : Alexandre Petreski	16 April 2019	130
Dr. Hurtz makes Taffy relaxed, but Bentley has to find out the truth.
31	31	"There Kitty Kitty" "(Le chaton d'égout)"	Script by : Mike de Sève; Storyboarded by : Matthieu Pitschon	17 April 2019	131
Mrs. Muchmore brings a cute cat to the manor, later revealed to be a villainous rat after a toilet flush.
32	32	"A Star Is Born" "(Une étoile est née)"	Script by : Sean O'Loane; Storyboarded by : Mickaël Mérigot	17 April 2019	132
Mr. Fuffernin tries to take a photo of Bentley, but he is bothering him.
33	33	"Makeover Fakeover" "(Double jeu)"	Script by : John Reynolds; Storyboarded by : Guillaume Picard	18 April 2019	133
Addie helps Bentley by giving Taffy a makeover to make him pretty, but Taffy has mixed signals over his friends' birthday.
34	34	"The Eye of the Raccoon" "(L'œil du raton laveur)"	Script by : Marine Lachenaud, Cédric Lachenaud and Shane Perez; Storyboarded by : Matthieu Pitschon and Benjamin Massaud	18 April 2019	134
Bentley prepares to fight Taffy and Mr. Fuffernin's puppy.
35	35	"The Sweaters" "(Tricomania)"	Script by : Jeff Hylton; Storyboarded by : Jean-Louis Champault	19 April 2019	135
On a snowy day, Taffy and Bentley learn from a computer how they can knit a sweater.
36	36	"School's Fools" "(Les cancres)"	Script by : Javier Valdez; Storyboarded by : Alexandre Viano	19 April 2019	136
Taffy and Bentley find an educating headphone.
37	37	"Citizen Taffy" "(Fausse nouvelle)"	Script by : Sean O'Loane; Storyboarded by : Matthieu Pitschon	22 April 2019	137
Taffy fights Bentley over a newspaper.
38	38	"Flowers for Bentley" "(Des fleurs pour Bentley)"	Script by : Joe Vitale; Storyboarded by : Alexandre Petreski	22 April 2019	138
Addie has a hypnosis clock and hypnotizes Forsythe and Binikos, so Taffy tries to take her hypnosis clock and hypnotizes Bentley into thinking of flowers.
39	39	"Raccoon Moon" "(Raton trop laveur)"	Script by : Javier Valdez; Storyboarded by : Mickaël Mérigot	23 April 2019	139
Taffy sees the moon above from himself.
40	40	"Love of Loaf" "(La doublure)"	Script by : Mike de Sève; Storyboarded by : Paul Hervé	23 April 2019	140
Mrs. Muchmore makes a circle of cucumbers on her eyes, and Bentley tries to make Taffy fake.
41	41	"Climate Control Freaks" "(Climat sous tension)"	Script by : John Reynolds; Storyboarded by : Alexis Gachet	24 April 2019	141
Taffy and Bentley fight over climate control.
42	42	"Cone Heads" "(La collerette)"	Script by : Jon Dalgaard; Storyboarded by : Jean-Louis Champault	21 May 2019	142
Taffy has an earache after he gets hit by a tree.
43	43	"Time Out of Taffy" "(Les visiteurs du futur)"	Script by : Aaron Dunn; Storyboarded by : Guillaume Picard	10 September 2019	143
Mish and Mash try to make Bentley think that he is time travelling.
44	44	"Raccoon in a Guilted Cage" "(Un seul être vous manque)"	Script by : Sean O'Loane; Storyboarded by : Thierry Beurcq	10 September 2019	144
When Bentley leaves the manor, Taffy feels lonely, and realizes that they are best frenemies.
45	45	"The Flea Party" "(La puce à l'oreille)"	Script by : Evan Menzel; Storyboarded by : Stéphane Annette	11 September 2019	145
Bentley puts fleas in a bottle to put them on Taffy's body.
46	46	"The Guard Dog" "(Le garde du corps)"	Script by : Jon Dalgaard; Storyboarded by : Fred Mintoff	11 September 2019	146
Taffy has a bear friend as a new guard dog, and Bentley doesn't stand a chance.
47	47	"The Cat's Pyjamas" "(Grosse fatigue)"	Script by : Christopher Panzner; Storyboarded by : Guillaume Picard	12 September 2019	147
Taffy wants to stay awake, so he tries to various attempts to open his eyes, including building a gym, watching TV, taking a bath and even drinking coffee, but all of his plans backfire.
48	48	"Happy Home" "(Les meilleurs ennemis)"	Script by : Jon Dalgaard; Storyboarded by : Alexandre Viano	12 September 2019	148
Taffy and Bentley get amnesia and believe they are best friends and Mrs. Muchmore is their enemy.
49	49	"Buried Treasure" "(La chasse au trésor)"	Script by : Aaron Dunn; Storyboarded by : Fred Mintoff	12 September 2019	149
Taffy and Bentley fight to hunt a hidden treasure.
50	50	"Fortune 500" "(Le biscuit de la chance)"	Script by : Joe Vitale; Storyboarded by : Mickaël Mérigot	13 September 2019	150
Taffy fights Bentley for a fortune cookie.
51	51	"Jitter Fever" "(La tremblotine)"	Script by : Joe Vitale; Storyboarded by : Stéphane Annette	13 September 2019	151
While jitter fever spreads around the area, Taffy swallows a phone that looks like he has the disease.
52	52	"The Recall" "(Le rappel)"	Script by : Joe Vitale; Storyboarded by : Alexis Gachet	13 September 2019	152
Forsythe gives a letter to Mrs. Muchmore where she receives an explosive bow for Taffy.
53	53	"New Leaf Taffy" "(Seconde chance)"	Script by : Alan Keane; Storyboarded by : Guillaume Picard	16 September 2019	153
Taffy is becoming naughty and bad, so he has a near-death experience where a raccoon acts as his conscience and tells him to be nice.
54	54	"The New Mrs. Muchmore" "(La nouvelle mme millesous)"	Script by : James Henry; Storyboarded by : Alexis Gachet	16 September 2019	154
Mrs. Muchmore gives more attention to Taffy than Bentley, which leads him to leaving the manor.
55	55	"The Upgrade" "(Le nouveau noeud)"	Script by : Jesse Nicholas; Storyboarded by : Fred Mintoff	16 September 2019	155
After seeing an announcement for a new and expensive bow, Mrs. M buys the bow for Taffy.
56	56	"Honey, I Shrunk the Raccoon" "(Un problème de taille)"	Script by : Jordan Gershowitz; Storyboarded by : Stéphane Annette	17 September 2019	156
Bentley and Taffy have shrunk and try to get the device to make themselves normal.
57	57	"Caged!" "(Prisonniers)"	Script by : John Reynolds; Storyboarded by : Matthieu Pitschon	17 September 2019	157
Mish and Mash are imprisoned in a cage and Bentley guards it.
58	58	"Scare Tactics" "(Fantômes contre fantômes)"	Script by : Alan Keane; Storyboarded by : Mickaël Mérigot	17 September 2019	158
Bentley makes a ghost raccoon puppet to scare Taffy.
59	59	"Petty Shack" "(Caddy Taffy)"	Script by : Aaron Dunn; Storyboarded by : Antoine Rota	18 September 2019	159
Bentley and Taffy prepare for a golf match.
60	60	"The Rival" "(Le rival)"	Script by : Jon Dalgaard; Storyboarded by : Alexis Gachet	18 September 2019	160
Bentley has a competition with a robot dog named Blaze.
61	61	"Mrs. ZZZ" "(Histoires à dormir debout)"	Script by : John Reynolds; Storyboarded by : Guillaume Picard	4 November 2019	161
Bentley tries to wake Mrs. Muchmore up.
62	62	"Spotted!" "(Les maladies imaginaires)"	Script by : Lee Pressman; Storyboarded by : Romain Cislo	4 November 2019	162
Taffy and Bentley both have fake fevers so they are pampered by Mrs. Muchmore.
63	63	"My Fair Puppy" "(Leçons de séduction)"	Script by : Alan Keane, James Hamilton and James Huntrods; Storyboarded by : Fred Mintoff	5 November 2019	163
Taffy wants Bentley to be nice to Mrs. Muchmore.
64	64	"Rags to Ostriches" "(Drôles d'oiseaux)"	Script by : Christopher Panzner; Storyboarded by : Stéphane Annette	5 November 2019	164
Forsythe brings an ostrich home and it becomes a new pet.
65	65	"The Big Sneeze" "(Atchoum)"	Script by : Mike de Sève, Ahmed Guerrouache, Evan Menzel and Pierre Sissmann; Storyboarded by : Alexandre Viano	6 November 2019	165
Bentley tries to make Taffy sneeze.
66	66	"Flying High" "(La tête dans les nuages)"	Script by : Mike de Sève, Ahmed Guerrouache, Andrew Healey and Pierre Sissmann; Storyboarded by : Matthieu Pitschon and Laura Muller	6 November 2019	166
Mrs. Muchmore gets a hot air balloon for Taffy, but Bentley tricks him into putting himself in the balloon.
67	67	"The Return of Scraggs" "(Ratons en vogue)"	Script by : Andrew Healey; Storyboarded by : Mickaël Mérigot	7 November 2019	167
Mrs. Muchmore hosts a raccoon party, but Bentley tries to get rid of Taffy.
68	68	"Twin or Lose" "(Le jumeau)"	Script by : Jesse Nicholas; Storyboarded by : Stéphane Annette	7 November 2019	168
Forsythe invites his twin brother Morsythe as a guest, who wreaks havoc in the manor.
69	69	"Little Monster" "(Petit monstre)"	Script by : Andrew Healey; Storyboarded by : Matthieu Pitschon and Laura Muller	8 November 2019	169
Addie wants to be strong like Binikos, but when he gives her sweets, she suddenly turns into a monster. But when Bentley sees her with her sweets, he tries to give her one, just to scare Taffy.
70	70	"Boot Camp Manor" "(A vos ordres Addie !)"	Script by : Shane Perez; Storyboarded by : Alexis Gachet	8 November 2019	170
Addie the scout challenges Taffy and Bentley in a boot camp.
71	71	"Mirror Mansion" "(De l'autre côté du miroir)"	Script by : Alan Keane, James Hamilton and James Huntrods; Storyboarded by : Guillaume Picard	11 November 2019	171
Bentley and Taffy switch lives in a mirror.
72	72	"Besties" "(Amis à tout prix)"	Script by : Jon Dalgaard; Storyboarded by : Thierry Beurcq	11 November 2019	172
Taffy meets a raccoon who doesn't appreciate him because he's pretending to be a house cat.
73	73	"I Love Lamp" "(Mille et un voeux)"	Script by : Jordan Gershowitz; Storyboarded by : Fred Mintoff	12 November 2019	173
Taffy and Bentley find a magic lamp.
74	74	"A Mouse in the House" "(Pas de maison sans souris)"	Script by : Christopher Panzner; Storyboarded by : Thierry Beurcq	12 November 2019	174
Bentley plans to reveal Taffy as a raccoon by making robot mice.
75	75	"Phony Pony" "(Un adorable poney)"	Script by : Alan Gilbey; Storyboarded by : Romain Cislo	13 November 2019	175
A pony pretends to be innocent and tries to get rid of Taffy and Bentley.
76	76	"Squeakophobia" "(Nuisances sonores)"	Script by : Sean O'Loane; Storyboarded by : Christophe Pittet	13 November 2019	176
Bentley hates the sound of squeaking noises.
77	77	"Clone Sweet Clone" "(La Menace des clones)"	Script by : Joe Vitale; Storyboarded by : Matthieu Pitschon	14 November 2019	177
Taffy tries to make sure that his three clones, Laffy, Mephistopheles and Starving, are wearing their bows to keep his secret.
78	78	"Silence of the Slams" "(Chuuut !)"	Script by : Aaron Dunn; Storyboarded by : Andreas Schuster	14 November 2019	178
Bentley tries to makes sure that an ill Mrs. Muchmore doesn't hear any noise.

=== Season 2 (2022–24) ===
The episodes are listed in the airing order of Boomerang Southeast Asia.

No. overall	No. in season	Title	Written by	Original release date	Prod. code
79	1	"A Maze In and Out"	Script by : Richard Preddy; Storyboarded by : Mickaël Mérigot	1 January 2022	201
Taffy and Bentley must escape a maze in order to be with Mrs. Muchmore. Note: This episode is dedicated to its writer.
80	2	"Mission Improbable"	Script by : Lee Pressman; Storyboarded by : Matthieu Pitschon	2 January 2022	202
Bentley must stop Taffy from getting the last caviar.
81	3	"Snapped"	Script by : James Henry; Storyboarded by : Guillaume Picard	8 January 2022	204
Taffy is scared that he needs to take a picture without his bow.
82	4	"Menace to Tennis"	Script by : Evan Menzel, Pierre Sissmann and Ahmed Guerrouache; Storyboarded by : Nicolas Livet	9 January 2022	208
Taffy uses tennis balls to toy with Bentley's obsession with catching balls.
83	5	"Bows'R'Us"	Script by : Lee Pressman; Storyboarded by : Benjamin Massaud	15 January 2022	205
Bentley discovers that Taffy has more than one bow.
84	6	"Sweet Charity"	Script by : Lee Pressman, Pierre Sissmann and Ahmed Guerrouache; Storyboarded by : Alexis Gachet	16 February 2022	209
Bentley sends Taffy to a pet shop.
85	7	"Family Fortunes"	Script by : Lee Pressman, Pierre Sissmann and Ahmed Guerrouache; Storyboarded by : Pierre Cerutti	8 February 2022	207
Mrs. Muchmore becomes poor but later finds fortune at the shack, Taffy needs to find a way to get back inside.
86	8	"Framed"	Script by : Lee Pressman; Storyboarded by : Thierry Beurcq	9 February 2022	203
Bentley is mistaken for a burglar dog.
87	9	"Give a Little Whistle"	Script by : Lee Pressman, Pierre Sissmann and Ahmed Guerrouache; Storyboarded by : Matthieu Pitschon	3 April 2022	210
Blanch the yeti helps save Taffy from Bentley.
88	10	"Bentley's Mission to Mars"	Script by : Lee Pressman, Pierre Sissmann and Ahmed Guerrouache; Storyboarded by : Mickaël Mérigot	9 April 2022	211
Bentley goes through astronaut training to head to outer space.
89	11	"Journey to the Centre of the Bear"	Script by : Ian Carney, Pierre Sissmann and Ahmed Guerrouache; Storyboarded by : Thierry Beurcq	10 April 2022	212
Bentley tries to get Taffy out of a bear's stomach, but Taffy makes himself at home in the bear.
90	12	"The Mole"	Script by : James Henry, Richelle Wilder, Pierre Sissmann and Ahmed Guerrouache; Storyboarded by : Nicolas Livet	16 April 2022	213
A mole is stealing all the junk food Taffy wants to eat, even though he and Bentley are on a diet.
91	13	"All You Don't Need Is Love"	Script by : Ian Carney, Richelle Wilder, Pierre Sissmann and Ahmed Guerrouache; Storyboarded by : Alexis Gachet	17 April 2022	214
Addie petsits Taffy and Bentley because Forsythe is on vacation after the mess Taffy and Bentley made.
92	14	"Ransom Raccoon"	Script by : Lee Pressman, Pierre Sissmann and Ahmed Guerrouache; Storyboarded by : Pierre Cerutti	23 April 2022	216
Two kidnappers kidnap Taffy to get ransom money from Mrs. Muchmore, but Taffy manages to take advantage of them.
93	15	"Snaggy Maggy"	Script by : Mike de Sève, Pierre Sissmann and Ahmed Guerrouache; Storyboarded by : Alexandre Petreski	23 April 2022	217
If Bentley leaves Mrs. Muchmore's property, Maggy will capture him.
94	16	"Plaster Disaster"	Script by : Greg Grabianski, Mike de Sève, Pierre Sissmann and Ahmed Guerrouache; Storyboarded by : Nicolas Livet	24 April 2022	218
Taffy's leg gets broken after he does acrobats and his legs need to heal before acrobating again.
95	17	"Bow Tied"	Script by : Lucy Heavens, Mike de Sève, Pierre Sissmann and Ahmed Guerrouache; Storyboarded by : Pierre Cerutti	30 April 2022	219
Bentley accidentally mistakes Forsythe's bow tie for Taffy's bow and destroys it. Forsythe can't concentrate without his bow tie.
96	18	"Big Brain Bentley"	Script by : Ian Carney, Pierre Sissmann and Ahmed Guerrouache; Storyboarded by : Benjamin Massaud	30 April 2022	220
Forsythe's nephew, Alex, builds an invention that makes Bentley smart, but this causes a slight malfunction by Taffy.
97	19	"Collared"	Script by : Lee Pressman, Pierre Sissmann and Ahmed Guerrouache; Storyboarded by : Matthieu Pitschon	2 July 2022	215
Taffy steals Bentley's collar badge so Bentley gets kicked out of the country club.
98	20	"The Haunted Hairball"	Script by : Jeff Hylton, Mike de Sève, Pierre Sissmann and Ahmed Guerrouache; Storyboarded by : Mickaël Mérigot	2 July 2022	221
Taffy tries to make a furball, but it later turns into a living furball monster who thinks Taffy is his dad.
99	21	"Bentley the Brave"	Script by : Lee Pressman; Storyboarded by : Alexandre Hesse	3 July 2022	222
Taffy tries to make Bentley a lifeguard so he could get close to Ferrari.
100	22	"Much More Magic"	Script by : Lee Pressman, Ahmed Guerrouache and Pierre Sissmann; Storyboarded by : Pierre Cerutti	3 July 2022	223
Taffy has a magic wand to annoy Bentley.
101	23	"Invisible"	Script by : Mike de Sève, Pierre Sissman, Ahmed Guerrouache and Greg Grabianski; Storyboarded by : Matthieu Pitschon	9 July 2022	224
Bentley accidentally turns Taffy invisible.
102	24	"The Pawfect Holiday"	Script by : Mike de Sève, Pierre Sissman, Ahmed Guerrouache and Stephen Sendess; Storyboarded by : Guillaume Picard	9 July 2022	225
Taffy and Bentley fight to make each other sad enough to go on a vacation.
103	25	"Down in the Dumps"	Script by : Lee Pressman, Pierre Sissmann and Ahmed Guerrouache; Storyboarded by : Pierre Cerutti	10 July 2022	226
Taffy and Bentley are searching for a special gem at the dumps.
104	26	"Meet the New Taffy"	Script by : Ian Carney, Pierre Sissmann and Ahmed Guerrouache; Storyboarded by : Alexis Gachet	10 July 2022	227
Taffy replaces himself with Mush.
105	27	"The Truth About Taffy"	Script by : Lee Pressman, Pierre Sissmann and Ahmed Guerrouache; Storyboarded by : Benjamin Massaud	16 July 2022	228
Bentley discovers that Taffy has gotten amnesia, giving him the opportunity to expose his secret identity to Mrs. Muchmore.
106	28	"The Return of Raccoon Ronald"	Script by : Greg Grabianski, Mike de Sève, Pierre Sissmann and Ahmed Guerrouache; Storyboarded by : Fred Mintoff	16 July 2022	229
Taffy and Bentley must protect Mrs. Muchmore from Raccoon Ronald after she is framed for stealing her own property.
107	29	"The Nutfather"	Script by : Nicole Torre, Mike de Sève, Pierre Sissmann and Ahmed Guerrouache; Storyboarded by : Alexis Gachet	17 July 2022	230
Taffy gets help from squirrels but they soon take advantage of him.
108	30	"It's All Downhill"	Script by : Aron Dunn, Mike de Sève, Pierre Sissmann and Ahmed Guerrouache; Storyboarded by : Guillaume Picard	17 July 2022	231
Taffy, Bentley and Mrs. Muchmore compete in a sledding race.
109	31	"Big Kahuna Raccoona"	Script by : Jeff Hylton, Mike de Sève, Pierre Sissmann and Ahmed Guerrouache; Storyboarded by : Olivier Thulliez	23 July 2022	232
Taffy tries to take over Mush's title as Big Kahuna Raccoona.
110	32	"Deserted"	Script by : Shane Perez, Mike de Sève and Jeff Hylton; Storyboarded by : Mickaël Mérigot	23 July 2022	234
Taffy and Bentley are stranded on an island.
111	33	"Royal Taffy"	Script by : Ian Carney, Pierre Sissmann and Ahmed Guerrouache; Storyboarded by : Pierre Cerutti	24 July 2022	236
Taffy is accidentally replaced by a princess lookalike named "Princess Latifa".
112	34	"Mama!"	Script by : Jon Dalgaard, Mike de Sève, Pierre Sissmann and Ahmed Guerrouache; Storyboarded by : Thierry Beurcq	24 July 2022	237
Taffy and Bentley become enamored with a baby eagle.
113	35	"Hero Worship"	Script by : Ian Carney, Pierre Sissmann and Ahmed Guerrouache; Storyboarded by : Fred Mintoff	30 July 2022	239
Bentley's nephew, Bradley, comes to visit to see Bentley defeat Taffy. So, Bentley makes Taffy to act like he's getting defeated by him - but Mish, Mash and Mush are threatening to kick Taffy out of the League of Raccoons if he continues to do so.
114	36	"Dr. Why?"	Script by : Chris West, Mike de Sève, Pierre Sissmann and Ahmed Guerrouache; Storyboarded by : Guillaume Picard	30 July 2022	240
Bentley uses Alex's time-travel remote to go back to the events of the first episode and prevent Taffy from becoming Mrs. Muchmore's pet. However, this causes different animals to take Taffy's place.
115	37	"Alex's Investigation"	Script by : Hadrien Kraskes, Mathieu Bouckenhove, Pierre Sissmann and Ahmed Guerrouache; Storyboarded by : Pierre Cerutti	31 July 2022	242
Alex discovers clues of a raccoon living in the manor.
116	38	"Manor for Sale"	Script by : Hadrien Kraskes, Mathieu Bouckenhove, Pierre Sissmann and Ahmed Guerrouache; Storyboarded by : Nicolas Livet	31 July 2022	243
Mrs. Muchmore practices by selling the manor, so Taffy and Bentley must stop the customers from buying it.
117	39	"The Soap Opera"	Script by : Julian Breheny, Jesse Nicholas, Mike de Sève, Pierre Sissmann and Ahmed Guerrouache; Storyboarded by : Alexis Gachet	6 August 2022	248
Taffy becomes a star of a live soap opera.
118	40	"Like Cats and Dogs"	Script by : Yann Roparr, Pierre Sissmann and Ahmed Guerrouache; Storyboarded by : Benjamin Massaud	7 August 2022	251
Bentley gets hit on the head and believes he's a cat.
119	41	"Lucky Maneki Neko"	Script by : Monsieus B., Pierre Sissman and Ahmed Guerrouache; Storyboarded by : Pierre Cerutti	1 November 2023	253
Bentley fools Taffy into thinking that he will win the lotto if he does what their new Lucky Cat asks.
120	42	"A Stench Most Foul"	Script by : Mike de Sève, Pierre Sissmann and Ahmed Guerrouache; Storyboarded by : Guillaume Picard	13 March 2023	206
A skunk sneaks into the manor. Taffy and Bentley are convinced that if the skunk sprays them, Mrs. Muchmore will kick them out of the mansion forever. Horrified, the pets join forces to get rid of the intruder.
121	43	"An Allperfect Education"	Script by : Hadrien Kraskes, Mathieu Bouckenhove, Pierre Sissmann and Ahmed Guerrouache; Storyboarded by : Olivier Thulliez	29 January 2024	271
Bentley is keen to impress Mrs. Muchmore after he and Taffy take lessons in good manners.
122	44	"Stars at the Country Club"	Script by : Hadrien Kraskes, Mathieu Bouckenhove, Pierre Sissman and Ahmed Guerrouache; Storyboarded by : Nicolas Livet	22 September 2023	250
When two stars of Mrs. Muchmore's favourite TV show arrive at the country club, Mrs. Muchmore is desperate to get a selfie with them, but the staff are determined to keep her away. Can Bentley and Taffy help her?
123	45	"Simply Purrfection"	Script by : James Henry, Richelle Wilder, Pierre Sissmann and Ahmed Guerrouache; Storyboarded by : Matthieu Pitschon	18 September 2023	246
Mrs. Muchmore sees a mouse in the manor and orders Taffy to get rid of it. Taffy tries to make like a cat and catch it, but is without success, so he teams up with the mouse to look like a supercat!
124	46	"Bringing Up Baby Bentley"	Script by : Lee Pressman, Pierre Sissmann and Ahmed Guerrouache; Storyboarded by : Alexandre Hesse	16 June 2023	235
When Bentley accidentally drinks Mrs. Muchmore's rejuvenating spring water, he looks younger and becomes a puppy again. And like every puppy, baby Bentley likes to play and explore, whatever the danger! Taffy must stop him from wrecking the country club before Mrs. Muchmore and her friends return!
125	47	"Man's Beast Friend"	Script by : Jeff Hylton, John Reynolds, Mike de Sève, Pierre Sissmann and Ahmed Guerrouache; Storyboarded by : Alexis Gachet	1 February 2024	274
A surprising guest in disguise attends Mrs. Muchmore's New Year's Eve gala.
126	48	"Gold Medal Madness"	Script by : Greg Grabianski, Mike de Sève, Pierre Sissmann and Ahmed Guerrouache; Storyboarded by : Fred Mintoff	14 July 2023	254
Bentley completely destroys Taffy's bow at the Waïwaï Resort. With no other red ribbon on the whole island except the one tied to the winner's medal for the annual summer sports competition, Taffy will have to fight with all his might to get it!
127	49	"Snowbound Showdown"	Script by : Jeff Hylton, John Reynolds, Mike de Sève and Ahmed Guerrouache; Storyboarded by : Alexis Gachet	5 February 2024	276
Taffy and Bentley make a very surprising deal to get rid of Blanch.
128	50	"Operation 'Super Christmas'"	Script by : Monsieus B., Pierre Sissmann and Ahmed Guerrouache; Storyboarded by : Matthieu Pitschon	1 December 2023	255
When Taffy eats the gifts for Santa, Bentley is determined not to let him ruin Christmas.
129	51	"Numbskulls of the North"	Script by : Jeff Hylton, John Reynolds, Mike de Sève, Pierre Sissmann and Ahmed Guerrouache; Storyboarded by : Alexis Gachet	2 February 2024	275
Can the pets get back to the snowy cabin before the yeti spoils Mrs. Muchmore's holiday?
130	52	"A Wolf in Bentley's Clothing"	Script by : Nicole Torre, Mike de Sève, Pierre Sissmann and Ahmed Guerrouache; Storyboarded by : Matthieu Pitschon	6 September 2023	238
Bentley messes up his fur while chasing Taffy. However, Mrs. Muchmore and her friends have been reading horror stories and convince themselves that he's a werewolf!
131	53	"Jungle Bungle"	Script by : Greg Grabianski, Mike de Sève, Pierre Sissmann and Ahmed Guerrouache; Storyboarded by : Guillaume Picard	25 January 2024	269
Taffy and Bentley have to work together to save Mrs. Muchmore from a cave.
132	54	"Let It Slide"	Script by : Greg Grabianski, Mike de Sève, Pierre Sissmann and Ahmed Guerrouache; Storyboarded by : Guillaume Picard	24 January 2024	268
The AI 3000 robot ruins Taffy's gigantic waterslide holiday plans.
133	55	"Last Game!"	Script by : Raphaël Guiard, Hadrien Kraskes, Mathieu Bouckenhove, Pierre Sissmann and Ahmed Guerrouache; Storyboarded by : Mickaël Mérigot	26 January 2024	270
When trying to improve her poor dance skills, Mrs. Muchmore gets stuck in an action game.
134	56	"Gang of Cats"	Script by : Monsieus B., Pierre Sissmann and Ahmed Guerrouache; Storyboarded by : Alexis Gachet	6 November 2023	257
Mrs. Muchmore wants Bentley to socialise with her friend's pets - but they're all cats!
135	57	"Close Protection"	Script by : Yann Ropass, Pierre Sissmann and Ahmed Guerrouache; Storyboarded by : Matthieu Pitschon	22 January 2024	266
Pets from the pet store pay a visit to Taffy and protect him from a mysterious character.
136	58	"The Debt"	Script by : Jon Dalgaard, John Reynolds, Mike de Sève, Pierre Sissmann and Ahmed Guerrouache; Storyboarded by : Fred Mintoff	8 November 2023	259
Taffy saves Fuffernin's dog's life. Feeling indebted, Mr. Corgi puts himself at Taffy's service. Keen to live a carefree life, Taffy sees just how far the dog will go to protect him.
137	59	"Robo No-Go!"	Script by : Greg Grabianski, Mike de Sève, Pierre Sissmann and Ahmed Guerrouache; Storyboarded by : Guillaume Picard	23 January 2024	267
Can Taffy thwart the Animal Identifier 3000 so that he can join Mrs. Muchmore on holiday?
138	60	"Bootcamp Bentley"	Script by : Lee Pressman, Pierre Sissmann and Ahmed Guerrouache; Storyboarded by : Alexandre Hesse	31 January 2024	273
To Taffy's dismay, a famous hunter is called in when a raccoon is caught stealing food.
139	61	"Caviar Empire"	Script by : Raphaël Guiard, Pierre Sissmann and Ahmed Guerrouache; Storyboarded by : Matthieu Pitschon	10 November 2023	261
Taffy decides to start his own blue caviar company! With help from his raccoon friends Mish, Mash and Mush, nobody can stop his firm now.
140	62	"An All Too Perfect Guest"	Script by : Hadrien Kraskes, Mathieu Bouckenhove, Pierre Sissmann and Ahmed Guerrouache; Storyboarded by : Benjamin Massaud	16 November 2023	265
Mrs. Allperfect comes to stay at the manor, but her visit is more difficult than expected.
141	63	"Mrs. Manykisses"	Script by : Raphaël Guiard, Pierre Sissmann and Ahmed Guerrouache; Storyboarded by : Mickaël Mérigot	31 October 2023	252
When Mrs. Muchmore goes out for the day, a jealous Bentley kicks Taffy out of the house.
142	64	"The Keepsake"	Script by : Douglas Booth, Mike de Sève, Pierre Sissmann and Ahmed Guerrouache; Storyboarded by : Benjamin Massaud	30 January 2024	272
When Mrs. Muchmore's childhood doll vanishes, Taffy and Bentley race to find it.
143	65	"The Manor Mummy"	Script by : Hadrien Kraskes, Mathieu Bouckenhove, Pierre Sissmann and Ahmed Guerrouache; Storyboarded by : Guillaume Picard	19 September 2023	247
Mrs. Muchmore borrows some exhibits from the local museum to show off to her guests, but when the light hits the Egyptian mummy, he wakes from his long sleep!
144	66	"Monkey Business"	Script by : Aron Dunn, Mike de Sève, Pierre Sissmann and Ahmed Guerrouache; Storyboarded by : Benjamin Massaud	6 February 2024	277
Taffy is jealous of Bentley's invitation to an exclusive party at the summer resort.
145	67	"Missing from the Resort"	Script by : Hadrien Kraskes, Mathieu Bouckenhove, Pierre Sissmann and Ahmed Guerrouache; Storyboarded by : Jean-Louis Champault	7 February 2024	278
Ferrari is missing! On their quest to find her, Bentley and Taffy meet an old nemesis.
146	68	"Poster Boy"	Script by : Lee Pressman, Pierre Sissmann and Ahmed Guerrouache; Storyboarded by : Matthieu Pitschon	11 September 2023	241
The Blue Caviar Company holds a competition to choose who will be featured on all of their advertising, and the first prize is a lifetime supply of caviar! Of course, Taffy decides to enter!
147	69	"Can't Scare Me"	Script by : Monsieus B., Pierre Sissmann and Ahmed Guerrouache; Storyboarded by : Mickaël Mérigot	9 November 2023	260
For Halloween, Mrs. Muchmore has prepared a giant piñata for Alex and Addie! To get it, they will have to play a treasure hunt, but Taffy wants to enjoy it alone and keep the candies for himself!
148	70	"Haunted by Hentley"	Script by : Ian Carney, Mike de Sève, Pierre Sissmann and Ahmed Guerrouache; Storyboarded by : Pierre Cerutti	7 November 2023	258
Taffy's great grand-uncle Scruggs helps him get their family's honour back.
149	71	"Vampire Nightmares"	Script by : Hadrien Kraskes, Mathieu Bouckenhove, Pierre Sissmann and Ahmed Guerrouache; Storyboarded by : Mickaël Mérigot	14 September 2023	244
During one of their chases, Taffy and Bentley uncover a hidden portrait of a vampire. When they read his name from the picture frame, Count Von Karloff comes to life! Mrs. Muchmore is quite taken with the handsome count - will Bentley and Taffy be able to protect her?
150	72	"Fetch!"	Script by : Lee Pressman, Pierre Sissmann and Ahmed Guerrouache; Storyboarded by : Nicolas Livet	15 November 2023	264
Taffy sends Bentley into the past using a time machine, but he comes back with a dinosaur!
151	73	"A Dog and a Raccoon Into the Wild"	Script by : Louis Prélicot, Pierre Sissmann and Ahmed Guerrouache; Storyboarded by : Fred Mintoff	14 November 2023	263
Lost in the forest, Taffy and Bentley have to find their way back to the manor!
152	74	"Meteor Madness"	Script by : Joe Vitale, Allan Keane, Mike de Sève, Dave Benjoya, Pierre Sissmann and Ahmed Guerrouache; Storyboarded by : Nicolas Livet	3 November 2023	256
A meteor crashes in front of Bentley, giving him some mysterious powers.
153	75	"A Dog's Life"	Script by : Louis Prélicot, Pierre Sissmann and Ahmed Guerrouache; Storyboarded by : Pierre Cerutti	13 November 2023	262
Bentley decides to hide from Mrs. Muchmore, but Taffy dresses up and takes his place.
154	76	"The Nine Lives of a Raccoon"	Script by : Monsieus B., Pierre Sissmann and Ahmed Guerrouache; Storyboarded by : Pierre Cerutti	21 September 2023	249
On holiday in the mountains, Mrs. Muchmore gets ill with summit sickness. The only cure is an edelweiss flower, so Binikos takes Bentley and Taffy on a dangerous journey to the top of a mountain to get it. Taffy is chosen to be the scout who will lead the way because cats have nine lives - but do raccoons?
155	77	"Lost at Ski"	Script by : Shane Perez, Jeff Hylton, Mike de Sève, Pierre Sissmann and Ahmed Guerrouache; Storyboarded by : Fred Mintoff	15 September 2023	245
At the ski resort, Taffy and Bentley compete to see which one of them will join the Rescue Animal Brigade. Both will need to pass a series of trials to see who is most worthy.
156	78	"Cloaked"	Script by : Jeff Hylton, Mike de Sève, Pierre Sissmann and Ahmed Guerrouache; Storyboarded by : Benjamin Massaud	14 June 2023	233
When Mish, Mash and Mush find a box full of hi-tech pet collars, they realise that they can scan other people to make the wearer look identical - a perfect opportunity for the raccoons to impersonate Taffy and try his life of luxury!

== Broadcast ==
The series premiered on Boomerang Africa on 17 December 2018, and later aired on multiple Boomerang stations around the world in 2019, particularly in the UK, which started airing the show on January 7, 2019, and in the Middle East, where it aired in May 2019 on Boomerang MENA. It also came in India on January 24, 2022, on Cartoon Network and in Pakistan on February 19, 2022, on the latter. Season one is available on Amazon Prime, and the second season aired on CBBC and is available on BBC iPlayer in the United Kingdom. The Walt Disney Company later acquired the series and starting in 2023, the show started airing in select Disney Channel feeds around the world. In the United States, the series was added to HBO Max, but was removed in 2022 following the Warner Bros. Discovery purge. As of 2024, the only legal way to watch the series in the U.S. is through select full episodes on the series' official YouTube channel. It also aired on GMA Network in the Philippines starting on August 30, 2025 with a Filipino-language dub.

== See also ==
- The Tom and Jerry Show - Another Flash-animated slapstick cartoon that also aired on Boomerang, albeit by Renegade Animation
