= Xavier Fagnon =

French actor

Xavier Fagnon (born November 22, 1972) is a French actor who specializes in dubbing. He is known for providing the French voices for actors such as Seth Rogen, Jason Momoa, Matthew Fox, and Michael Weatherly.

== Biography ==
Fagnon learned the fundamentals of dramatic arts at the conservatory of La Celle-Saint-Cloud, studying under Jacques Herbert. After completing his classical training, he began his career by writing and performing his own one-man shows featuring impressions. He has also appeared in various theatrical productions, including comedies and classical plays at venues such as the Théâtre de la Boussole and Le Lucernaire.

Fagnon is most prominent in the French dubbing industry, where he is the regular French voice for numerous international actors, including Jason Momoa (notably in the film Aquaman), Seth Rogen, Rob Corddry, Matthew Fox (particularly as Jack Shephard in Lost), and Michael Weatherly (as Anthony DiNozzo in NCIS). He has also frequently dubbed characters portrayed by Hugh Jackman, Jude Law, Ioan Gruffudd, and Richard Armitage.

In animation, Fagnon has provided the French voice for the Joker in several DC Comics animated series and films. He was also a voice actor for the French animated television series Captain Biceps.

Furthermore, he voices prominent characters in the French dub of The Simpsons, having taken over roles including Mr. Burns, Principal Skinner, Krusty the Clown, and Chief Wiggum.

== Dubbing roles ==
=== Theatrical animation ===
- Madagascar - Skipper (Tom McGrath)
- Over the Hedge – Doctor Dennis (Joel McCrary)/Nugent (Brian Stepanek)
- Paprika – Doctor Kōsaku Tokita (Tōru Furuya)
- Magic Roundabout (2007) - Dylan (Jimmy Hibbert)
- Meet the Robinsons - Uncle Art (Adam West)
- Kung Fu Panda - Master Mantis (Seth Rogen)
- Madagascar: Escape 2 Africa - Skipper (Tom McGrath)
- Up - Alpha (Bob Peterson)
- Kung Fu Panda 2 - Master Mantis (Seth Rogen)
- Madagascar 3: Europe's Most Wanted - Skipper (Tom McGrath)
- Ice Age: Continental Drift - Flynn (Nick Frost)
- Hotel Transylvania - Frankenstein (Kevin James)
- Epic - Grub (Chris O'Dowd)
- Monsters University - Sulley (John Goodman)
- Penguins of Madagascar - Skipper (Tom McGrath)
- Hotel Transylvania 2 - Frankenstein (Kevin James)
- The Good Dinosaur - Poppa Henry (Jeffrey Wright)
- Kung Fu Panda 3 - Master Mantis (Seth Rogen)
- Zootopia - Mayor Lionheart (J.K. Simmons)
- Hotel Transylvania 3: Summer Vacation - Frankenstein (Kevin James)
- Ralph Breaks the Internet - Double Dan (Alfred Molina)
- The Super Mario Bros. Movie - Donkey Kong

=== Television animation ===
- South Park - Terrance (Matt Stone)
- The Simpsons - Fat Tony, Jasper Beardsley, Joe Quimby, Mr. Burns, Kent Brockman, Krusty the Clown, Nick Riviera, Seymour Skinner, Tahiti Bob (Sideshow Bob), Tahiti Mel (Sideshow Mel), additional voices
- Kung Fu Panda: Legends of Awesomeness - Master Mantis (Max Koch)
- The Lion Guard - Janja (Andrew Kishino)
- Taffy - Bentley (Tyler Bunch)
- Squish - Squish's Dad (Cory Doran)

=== Video games ===
- Jak and Daxter series – Daxter (Max Casella)
- SSX Tricky – JP Arsenault

=== Live-action ===
- Commander in Chief – Vince Taylor (Anthony Azizi)
- The Dead Zone – Johnny Smith (Anthony Michael Hall)
- Fantastic Four – Mister Fantastic (Ioan Gruffudd)
- Fantastic Four: Rise of the Silver Surfer – Mister Fantastic (Ioan Gruffudd)
- Law & Order: Special Victims Unit – Doctor George Huang (B. D. Wong)
- Lost – Jack Shephard (Matthew Fox)
- Sliders – Quinn Mallory (Robert Floyd)
- The Pretender – Angelo (Paul Dillon)
- Threat Matrix – Mohammad 'Mo' Hassain (Anthony Azizi)
- Citadel: Diana – Gabriele (Filippo Nigro)

=== Non-dubbing roles ===
- Le Petit Nicolas – Le Bouillon
- Mickey Mouse – Customer (Episode: "Croissant de Triomphe")
