= Turtle in Paradise =

2010 children's novel by Jennifer L. Holm

- First edition
- Author: Jennifer L. Holm
- Language: English
- Genre: Children's literature
- Publisher: Random House Children's Books
- Publication date: December 27, 2010
- Publication place: United States
- Pages: 208; 224 (paperback)
- Awards: 2011 Newbery Honor Book
- ISBN: 9780375836909

Turtle in Paradise is a 2010 children's novel written by Jennifer L. Holm. The main character, Turtle, is eleven years old and lives in Key West, Florida during the Great Depression. The book is a 2011 Newbery Honor Book and also won the Golden Kite Award.

== Plot ==
Turtle Curry is an eleven-year-old girl living with her mother Sadiebelle and cat named Smokey in New Jersey, who is upset that her mother's new employer refuses to let Turtle and her cat stay in her house. Turtle says goodbye and enters the front seat of Mr. Lyle Edgit, a family friend and a merchant. When Turtle arrives in Key West, her Aunt Minerva "Minnie" is confused because she didn't receive a letter about Turtle coming to live with her. Aunt Minnie introduces her to their three cousins: Beans (the oldest cousin who is distant), Kermit (who had rheumatic fever), and Buddy (who is quick to pee in his pants). Aunt Minnie forces Beans to share his room with Turtle, but he becomes irritated and resentful of his cousin.

The boys and their friends, Pork Chop, Jelly and Ira, are called 'The Diaper Gang' as they care for the babies in their town, using a 'secret recipe' to cure diaper rash. Turtle begins to grow accustomed to her new surroundings and its people. She later finds out her grandmother is still alive. Turtle does her best to win her grandmother's love and succeeds.

As the summer begins to draw to a close, Turtle finds a map to an old lost treasure and she goes with the boys to find it, but are caught off guard when a hurricane hits the Keys and they are forced to take shelter in a shack. Once the hurricane passes, they take their discovered loot and head home where Turtle finds her mother and Archie Meeks, her mother's new husband, are waiting for them. Sharing the treasure they found and dreaming of a new life, Turtle and her mother plan to go to Georgia, but discover that Archie has stolen the treasure and has headed off to Cuba. Despite this setback, Turtle comes to believe that she and her family will still find happiness in paradise.

== Back Cover Summary ==
Set in 1935 during the Great Depression, the novel follows a young girl nicknamed Turtle, who is sent to Key West, Florida, to live with relatives she has never met. Facing economic hardship and uncertainty, Turtle adjusts to life in a new environment marked by unfamiliar customs, extended family members, and local traditions. As she becomes acquainted with her cousins and uncovers family secrets, including a rumored buried treasure, Turtle gradually adapts to her surroundings. Over the course of the story, she develops greater independence and a broader understanding of family and community.

== Description ==
Turtle in Paradise is a small format book measuring 5.2 x 0.5 x 7.6 inches. This small book is for children ages 9 to 12 years. The grade level for this book is 3 to 7. The Lexile for this book is 610L. The sales rank 96,734 in 6 months

== Reception ==
Reed Elsevier stated in Publishers Weekly in 2010, "Turtle, the witty 11-year-old narrator of this standout historical novel, is a straight shooter. 'Everyone thinks children are sweet as Necco Wafers, but I've lived long enough to know the truth: kids are rotten.' When her romantic and unrealistic mother, who's always falling in and out of love, gets a housekeeping job that won't allow children, she sends Turtle to her estranged family in Depression-era Key West" According to Horn Book Magazine, "It's 1935, and narrator Turtle is sent to live in Key West. With her stoic nature and quick wits, she's able to fit in with her boy cousins. Turtle's voice is tart and world-weary. Though her narrative is peppered with references from the time, modern-day readers will have no trouble relating, and the fast-moving plot will keep them interested to the end."
