= Matthew Holm =

American writer, web developer and artist

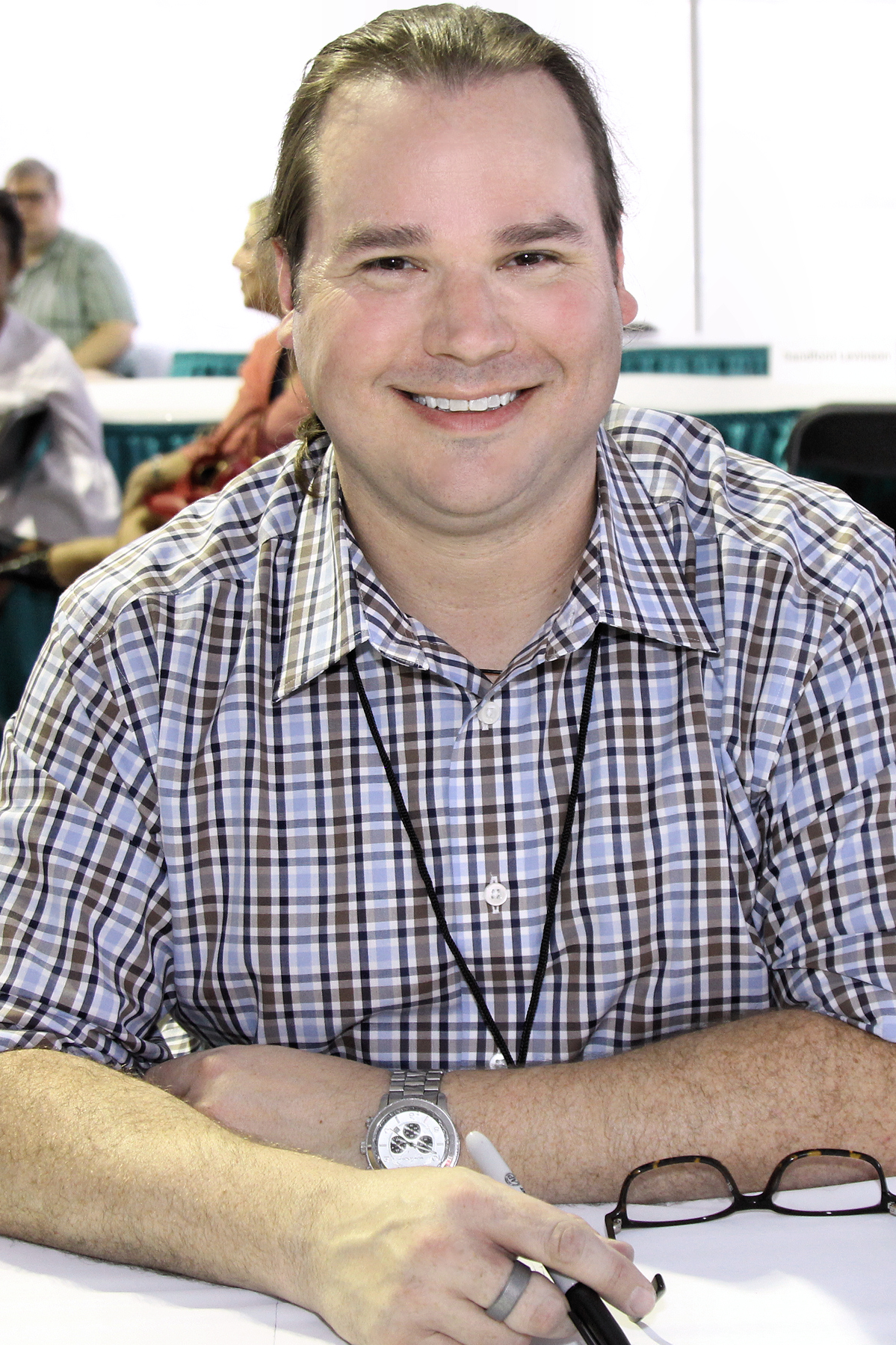
- Holm at the 2017 Texas Book Festival
- Education: Pennsylvania State University
- Occupations: Writer, web developer, and artist
- Relatives: Jennifer Holm (sister)
- Writing career
- Notable work: Babymouse (as illustrator)

Matthew Holm is an American writer, web developer and artist. He is the illustrator of the children's storybook Babymouse series.

== Personal life ==
Holm was raised in Audubon, Pennsylvania with his three brothers and one sister. His father was a pediatrician, and his mother was a pediatric nurse. Holm attended Pennsylvania State University where he was the political cartoonist for the university's newspaper. After graduation from college he joined his sister Jennifer Holm in New York, creating artwork to self-publish on the internet. Holm and his wife moved from New York's Hudson Valley in 2007 to Northeast Portland, Oregon.

== Career ==
Holm started his career as an editor at the Hearst Corporation's Country Living Magazine. He wrote about topics including homebuilding, architecture, and historic preservation to food, travel, and current events for eight years.

Holm is a web creative director and business consultant at Hot Knife Design Incorporation, where he aids in developing user-friendly web interfaces. Matt has been the Vice Chair of the Computer-Human Interaction Forum of Oregon (CHIFOO).

Holm is also an illustrator. He teams up with his sister Jennifer Holm (Jenni) to create comic books for children. Jenni and Matt grew up playing with stuffed mice which gave Jenni the idea of writing a comic book about a female mouse that has a girly, sassy attitude, and a passion for pink. Jenni writes the series of comic books, and Matt illustrates them. They named this comic book Babymouse. With the help of editor Shana Corey and director Cathy Goldsmith, Babymouse became an award-winning comic book where more than a million copies are currently in print and selling as of 2013. They have also created Babymouse T-shirts and messenger bags.

The Holm siblings collaborate over a distance (Jenni lives in Maryland) through the Internet and by courier, expanding on their series of comic books. They have created a second comic book series, released in 2011, called "Squish" . A novel called Middle School Is Worse Than Meatloaf, with more detailed illustrations, has also been released. There are several other books, written by other writers, that Matt has illustrated: Suburbageddon (1999), I Fooled You: Ten Stories of Tricks, Jokes and Switcheroos (2010), Gray Highway: An American UFO Journey (2010), and Marty Gray ( Ebook) (2010).

== Notable works ==
=== Babymouse series ===
- Queen of the World (2005)
- Our Hero (2005)
- Beach Babe (2006)
- Rockstar (2006)
- Heartbreaker (2006)
- Camp Babymouse (2007)
- Skater Girl (2007)
- Puppy Love (2007)
- Monster Mash (2008)
- The Musical (2009)
- Dragonslayer (2009)
- Burns Rubber (2010)
- Cupcake Tycoon (2010)
- Mad Scientist (2011)
- A Very Babymouse Christmas (2011)
- Extreme Babymouse (2012)
- Happy Birthday, Babymouse.

=== Squish series ===
- Super Amoeba (2011)
- Brave New Pond (2011)

=== Other works ===
- Suburbageddon (1999)
- Middle School Is Worse Than Meatloaf: A Year Told Through Stuff (2007)
- I Fooled You: Ten Stories of Tricks, Jokes and Switcheroos (2010)
- Gray Highway: An American UFO Journey (2010)
- Marty Gray ( Ebook) (2010)
