= Jennifer L. Holm =

American author of children's books (born 1968)

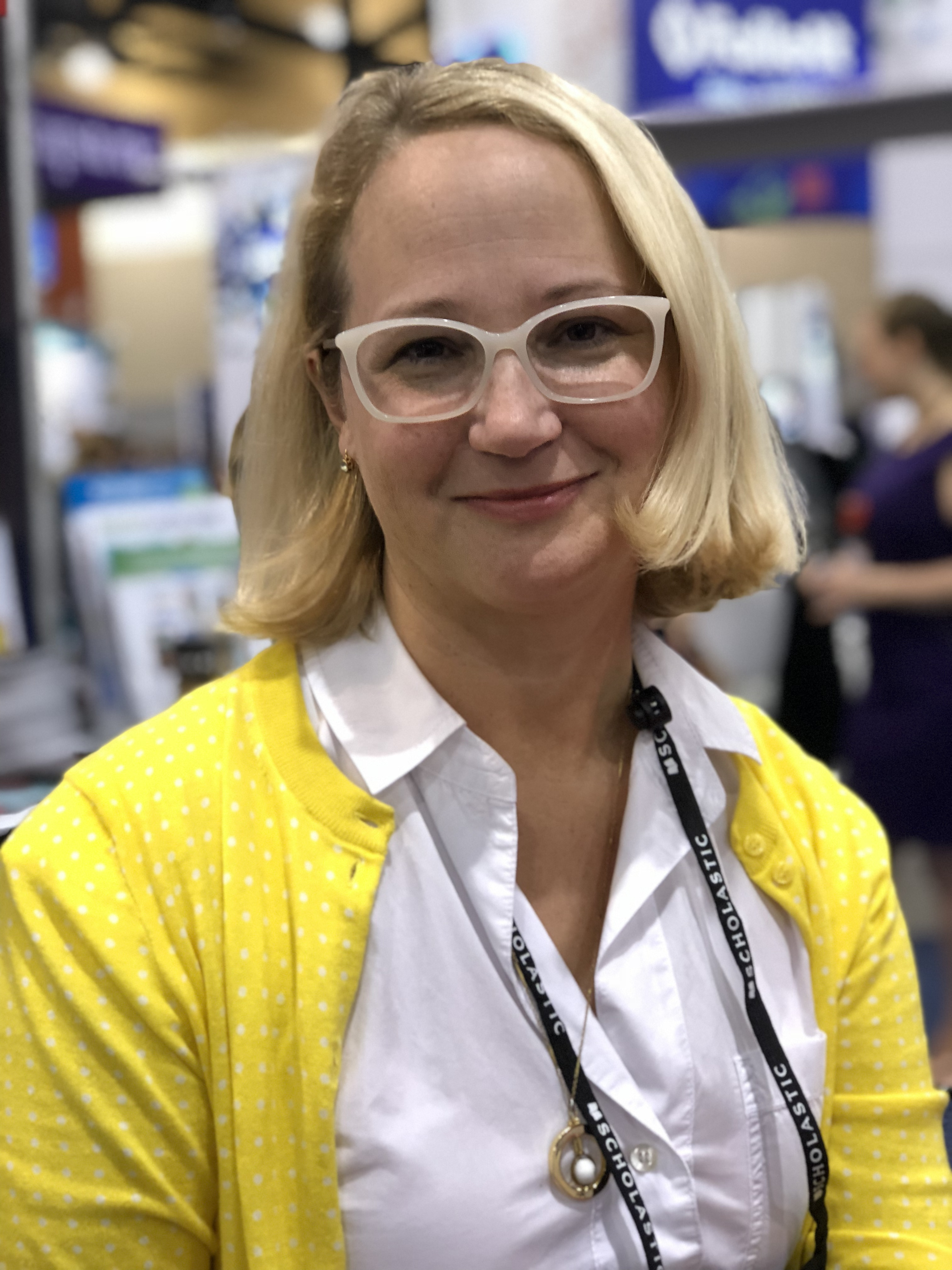
- Holm in 2017
- Born: June 16, 1968 (age 58); San Diego, California, U.S.
- Education: Dickinson College
- Occupations: Writer; illustrator
- Children: 2
- Relatives: Matthew Holm (brother)
- Writing career
- Period: 1999–present
- Notable works: Babymouse; Squish; The Stink Files; Our Only May Amelia; Middle School is Worse Than Meatloaf; Turtle in Paradise; The Fourteenth Goldfish
- Website: jenniferholm.com

Jennifer L. Holm (born June 16, 1968) (Note: In the acknowledgements of Holm's book Penny from Heaven, she gives thanks to her mother, Penny Scaccia. The California Birth Index lists a Jennifer L. Holm born in San Diego on June 16, 1968 to a Mrs. Scaccia, which corroborates her birthdate.) is an American children's writer, and recipient of three Newbery Honors and the Eisner Award.

== Early life and education ==
Holm was born in 1968 in San Diego, California. She spent her early life living on Whidbey Island on the Puget Sound in Washington state, before her family relocated to Audubon, Pennsylvania, with her four brothers. She attended Methacton High School for four years. She graduated from Dickinson College in Carlisle, Pennsylvania.

== Career ==
After college she worked in television and later began to write. Our Only May Amelia, the story of a 12-year-old girl living in late-19th century in coastal southwestern Washington state, inspired by a diary written by her great-aunt, became her first published novel and was a 2000 Newbery Honor Book.

Holm wrote a series featuring a character named Jane Peck, a young woman living in the 1850s (Boston Jane: An Adventure, Boston Jane: Wilderness Days and Boston Jane: The Claim); The Creek, a horror thriller; Babymouse and Squish, series of graphic novels for children illustrated by her brother Matthew; and The Stink Files, a series co-written with her husband Jonathan Hamel featuring James Edward Bristlefur, a cat raised by a British secret agent who is adopted by an American family and renamed Mr. Stink after his owner is murdered.

Her story Penny from Heaven is set in the 1950s and features an 11-year-old Italian-American girl It was a 2007 Newbery Honor recipient. Turtle in Paradise, which is set in the Great Depression in Key West, Florida, was a 2011 Newbery Honor recipient. Babymouse for President won the 2013 Eisner Award for Best Publication for Early Readers (up to age 7).

Our Only May Amelia has been adapted for the stage by John Olive. The River Theater in Astoria, Oregon, performed it for its 2006 summer run, in conjunction with FinnFest USA '06. The events of the play (and book) were set just north of Astoria in Naselle, Washington.

== Personal life ==
As of 2013, Holm lives in Foster City, California, with her husband and two children.

== Works ==
=== Standalone novels ===
- The Creek (2003)
- Penny from Heaven (2007) - Newbery Honor
- The Lion of Mars (2021)
- Outside. Scholastic Press. October 7, 2025. ISBN 978-1-5461-3814-3.

=== The Fourteenth Goldfish series ===
- The Fourteenth Goldfish (2014)
- The Third Mushroom (2018)

=== Sunny series ===
Graphic novels, illustrated by Matthew Holm and colored by Lark Pien

- Sunny Side Up (2015)
- Swing it, Sunny (2017)
- Sunny Rolls the Dice (2019)
- Sunny Makes a Splash (2021)
- Sunny Makes Her Case (2024)
- Sunny Figures It Out (2025)

=== May Amelia series ===
- Our Only May Amelia (1999) - Newbery Honor
- The Trouble with May Amelia (2011), illustrated by Adam Gustavson

Our Only May Amelia can be found in the Newbery Great Girls Boxed Set (1999) along with three other Newbery Winners.

=== Boston Jane novel series ===
1. Boston Jane: An Adventure (2001)
2. Wilderness Days (2002)
3. The Claim (2004)

=== Key West series ===
- Turtle in Paradise (2010) - Newbery Honor
- Full of Beans (2016) - a prequel from the perspective of Turtle's cousin, Beans.

=== Ginny Davis series ===
Illustrated by Elicia Castaldi

1. Middle School Is Worse Than Meatloaf: A Year Told Through Stuff (2007)
2. Eighth Grade is Making Me Sick: Ginny Davis's Year In Stuff (2012)

=== The Stink Files series ===
In collaboration with Jonathan Hamel, illustrated by Brad Weinman

- The Stink Files, Dossier 001: The Postman Always Brings Mice (2004)
- The Stink Files, Dossier 002: To Scratch a Thief (2004)
- The Stink Files, Dossier 003: You Only Have Nine Lives (2005)

=== Babymouse series ===
Graphic novels, in collaboration with Matthew Holm

1. Queen of the World! (2005)
2. Our Hero (2005)
3. Beach Babe (2006)
4. Rock Star (2006)
5. Heartbreaker (2006)
6. Camp Babymouse (2007)
7. Skater Girl (2007)
8. Puppy Love (2007)
9. Monster Mash (2008)
10. Babymouse: The Musical (2009)
11. Dragonslayer (2009)
12. Babymouse Burns Rubber (2010)
13. Cupcake Tycoon (2010)
14. Mad Scientist (2011)
15. A Very Babymouse Christmas (2011)
16. Babymouse for President (2012)
17. Extreme Babymouse (2013)
18. Happy Birthday, Babymouse (2014)
19. Bad Babysitter (2015)
20. Babymouse Goes for the Gold (2016)

Compilations:

- Babymouse Collection Books 1–13

=== Babymouse Tales From the Locker series ===
Illustrated by Matthew Holm

1. Lights, Camera, Middle School! (July 4, 2017), ISBN 978-0399554384
2. Miss Communication (July 24, 2018), ISBN 978-0399554414
3. School-Tripped (July 29, 2019), ISBN 978-0399554452

=== Little Babymouse ===
Picture book, illustrated by Matthew Holm

- Little Babymouse and the Christmas Cupcakes (October 24, 2016), ISBN 978-1101937433

=== Squish series ===
Graphic novels, in collaboration with Matthew Holm

1. Squish: Super Ameoba (2011)
2. Squish: Brave New Pond (2011)
3. Squish: The Power Of The Parasite (2012)
4. Squish: Captain Disaster (2012)
5. Squish: Game On! (2013)
6. Squish: Fear the Amoeba (2014)
7. Squish: Deadly Disease of Doom (2015)
8. Squish: Pod vs. Pod (2016)

=== My First Comics ===
Illustrated by Matthew Holm

- I'm Grumpy (2016)
- I'm Sunny (2016)
- I'm Silly (2017)
- I'm Scared (2017)
- I'm Cheese

=== Comic book anthologies ===
- Comics Squad: Recess! (2014) Edited by Jennifer L. Holm
  - "The Super-Secret Ninja Club" by Gene Luen Yang
  - "Book 'Em, Dog Man!" by Dav Pilkey
  - "Betty and the Perilous Pizza Day" by Jarrett J. Krosoczka
  - "The Magic Acorn" by Ursula Vernon
  - "Babymouse: The Quest for Recess" by Jennifer L. Holm and Matthew Holm
  - "Jiminy Sprinkles in 'Freeze Tag'" by Eric Wight
  - "300 Words" by Dan Santat
  - "The Rainy Day Monitor" by Raina Telgemeier and Dave Roman
- Comics Squad #2: Lunch! (2016) Edited by Jennifer L. Holm and Matthew Holm
  - "Crazy Little Thing Called Lunch!" by Cece Bell
  - "Snoopy in...Lunchtime Beagle" by Peanuts
  - "Babymouse: Lunch Table Champion" by Jennifer L. Holm and Matthew Holm
  - "The Case of the Missing Science Project" by Jason Shiga
  - "Pikput & Cullen in...Worst Day Ever!" by Cecil Castellucci and Sara Varon
  - "Lucy & Andy Neanderthal: Cave Soup" by Jeffrey Brown
  - "Lunch Bomb 1943" by Nathan Hale
  - "Lunch Girl and the Ominous Origin" by Jarrett J. Krosoczka
- Comics Squad #3: Detention! (2017) Edited by Jennifer L. Holm, Matthew Holm, and Jarrett J. Krosoczka

=== Anthology contributions ===
- Shelf Life: Stories by the Book (2003), edited by Gary Paulsen
  - Contains "Follow the Water" by Jennifer L. Holm
- Friends: Stories about New Friends, Old Friends, and Unexpectedly True Friends (2005)
  - Contains "My Best Friend" by Jennifer L. Holm

=== Book introductions ===
- Anne of Avonlea by L. M. Montgomery (originally published 1909) - Introduction
- Too Much Information by Gene Ambaum and Bill Barnes (2012) - Foreword

== Selected awards and honors ==
- Newbery Honor Awards
  - 2000 for Our Only May Amelia
  - 2007 for Penny from Heaven
  - 2011 for Turtle in Paradise
- 2011 Golden Kite Award for Turtle in Paradise
- 2013 Eisner Award for Best Publication for Early Readers for Babymouse for President
- 2014 California Book Awards Gold Medal Juvenile winner for The Fourteenth Goldfish
- 2015 E. B. White Read Aloud Award for The Fourteenth Goldfish
