= Our Only May Amelia =

1999 novel by Jennifer L. Holm

- First edition cover art
- Author: Jennifer L. Holm
- Language: English
- Genre: Young adult fiction; historical fiction
- Published: 1999 HarperCollins
- Publication place: United States
- Media type: Print (Hardcover)
- Pages: 253
- ISBN: 978-0-786-22742-6

Our Only May Amelia is a 1999 American historical youth novel by Jennifer L. Holm. Set in 1899 near Astoria, Oregon, it follows a young girl's coming of age amongst the region's Finnish community, and her life as the youngest of seven children—and the only girl—of Finnish immigrant parents. The novel is based on diaries written by Holm's aunt.

== Reception ==
Publishers Weekly called Our Only May Amelia an "extraordinary debut novel" with an "unforgettable heroine." The novel was the recipient of a Newbery Honor in 2000.

== Related works ==
In 2012, Holm published a sequel, The Trouble with May Amelia, set directly after the events of the original novel.
