= U.S. Route 101 in Washington =

Section of U.S. Highway 101 in Washington (state), United States

U.S. Route 101
- Map of western Washington with US 101 highlighted in red

Route information
- Maintained by WSDOT
- Length: 365.55 mi (588.30 km)
- Existed: 1926–present
- Tourist routes: Lewis and Clark Trail; Pacific Coast Scenic Byway

Major junctions
- South end: US 101 at Oregon state line
- SR 4 near Ilwaco; SR 6 in Raymond; US 12 in Aberdeen; SR 20 in Discovery Bay; SR 104 near Discovery Bay; SR 3 in Shelton; SR 8 near Olympia
- North end: I-5 in Tumwater

Location
- Country: United States
- State: Washington
- Counties: Pacific, Grays Harbor, Jefferson, Clallam, Mason, Thurston

Highway system
- United States Numbered Highway System; List; Special; Divided; State highways in Washington; Interstate; US; State; Scenic; Pre-1964; 1964 renumbering; Former
← SR 100	→ SR 102

U.S. Route 101 (US 101) is a United States Numbered Highway that runs along the West Coast from Los Angeles, California to Tumwater, Washington. Within the state of Washington, US 101 connects cities on the coast of the Pacific Ocean and encircles the Olympic Peninsula around the Olympic Mountains. It also serves as the main access for Olympic National Park, several state parks, and other scenic and recreational areas.

The highway enters from Oregon on the Astoria–Megler Bridge over the mouth of the Columbia River near Astoria, Oregon. From there, it runs for 366 miles (589 km) north through Ilwaco, Raymond, Aberdeen, Hoquiam, and Forks before turning east towards Port Angeles. US 101 turns south near Discovery Bay and continues along the Hood Canal through Shelton towards Olympia, where it becomes a freeway and terminates at Interstate 5 (I-5) in Tumwater.

== Route description ==
US 101 is the westernmost route of the United States Numbered Highway System, traveling along the Pacific Coast from Los Angeles, California, to Oregon and Washington. Its northern terminus is in Tumwater, Washington, but its northernmost point is in Port Angeles. A section of the highway in Clallam County is signed east–west, while the rest is north–south, albeit turned around 180 degrees on the east side of the Olympic Peninsula. US 101 is designated as part of two state scenic highways: the Pacific Coast Scenic Byway, which covers the entire route within Washington; and part of the Lewis and Clark Trail, which travels along the Columbia and Snake rivers.

Most of the highway is listed as part of the National Highway System and the state's Highways of Statewide Significance program, which recognizes its connection to major communities. A section of US 101 between State Route 4 (SR 401) and Aberdeen is also designated by the U.S. Department of Defense as part of the Strategic Highway Network under the National Highway System. The highway is maintained by the Washington State Department of Transportation (WSDOT), who conduct an annual survey of traffic volume expressed in terms of annual average daily traffic. Average traffic volumes on the highway in 2016 ranged from a minimum of 950 vehicles near Kalaloch to a maximum of 100,000 vehicles in Olympia.

=== Astoria to Aberdeen ===
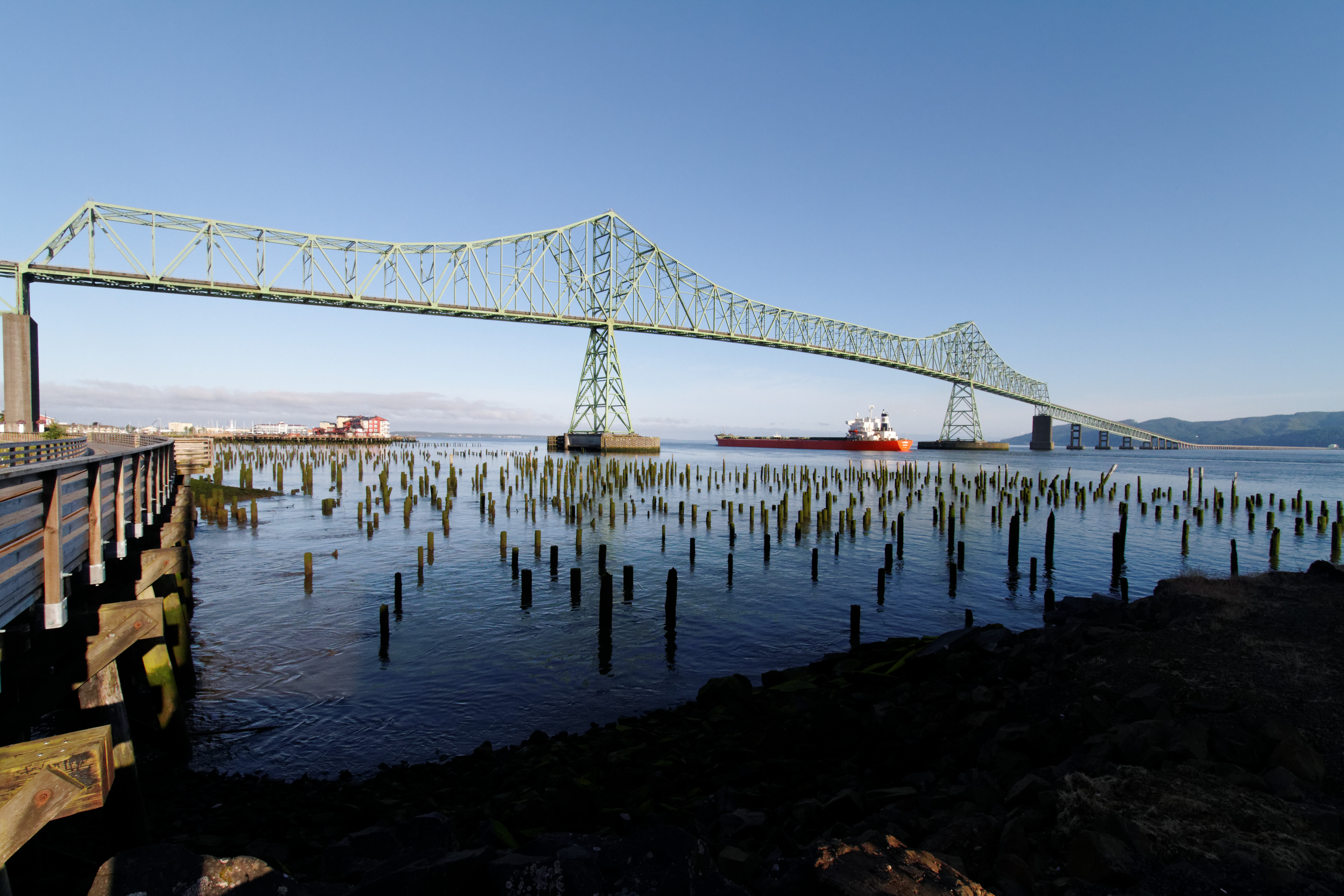
The Astoria–Megler Bridge carries US 101 over the Columbia River between Oregon and Washington

US 101 enters Washington on the Astoria–Megler Bridge, a 4.1-mile (6.6 km) bridge connecting Astoria, Oregon, to Megler, Washington, over the Columbia River near its mouth. It is the longest continuous truss bridge in North America and among the longest of its kind in the world. At the north end of the bridge is a junction with SR 401, which travels northeast along the Columbia River while US 101 turns west to follow the river downstream. The highway turns northwest along the river into Fort Columbia State Park, where it travels through a tunnel that passes under the historic fort's grounds, and continues onward through the town of Chinook. US 101 turns west around the head of Baker Bay near Port of Ilwaco Airport and intersects its short alternate route, which bypasses the coastal section of the highway. US 101 then dives southwesterly along the Wallacut River into Ilwaco, where it runs through town as Spruce Street and turns north onto 1st Avenue at an intersection with SR 100, which provides access to Cape Disappointment State Park.

The highway leaves Ilwaco and swerves northwest to enter Seaview at the south end of the Long Beach Peninsula. US 101 then turns east onto 40th Street at an intersection with SR 103, which continues to Long Beach and Leadbetter Point State Park. After intersecting the northern terminus of its alternate route, the highway turns north to cross the Wallacut River again and pass through hills on the south end of Willapa Bay. US 101 travels through part of the Willapa National Wildlife Refuge and continues along the east side of the bay, making several turns while on the coastline. The highway then crosses the Naselle River and turns east to reach Johnston's Landing, a junction near Naselle with SR 4, which follows the Columbia River to Longview and Kelso.

From Johnston's Landing, US 101 turns north and follows the South Nemah River before resuming its route along the east side of Willapa Bay. After crossing the Palix and Bone rivers, the highway turns northeast to reach the head of the bay and southeast to follow the Willapa River upstream to South Bend. US 101 travels through the city and heads northeast along the river towards Raymond, where it becomes a four-lane divided highway. The highway crosses over the South Fork Willapa River and intersects SR 6 at a roundabout before turning north to travel through downtown Raymond. US 101 then crosses the main branch of the Willapa River and intersects the south end of SR 105 in northern Raymond.

The highway continues north into the Willapa Hills, traveling through forestland with pockets of farmland. After crossing into Grays Harbor County, US 101 intersects SR 107, which provides connections to Montesano and points east. The highway turns northwest and descends from Cosi Hill and Rock Crusher Hill overlooking the Chehalis River delta before it reaches Cosmopolis. US 101 then enters Aberdeen and turns west onto Curtis Street before intersecting SR 105 and its spur route on the south side of the Chehalis River. SR 105 forms a full loop around US 101 between Raymond and Aberdeen along the Pacific Coast and Grays Harbor, serving the city of Westport in the process.

=== Aberdeen to Port Angeles ===
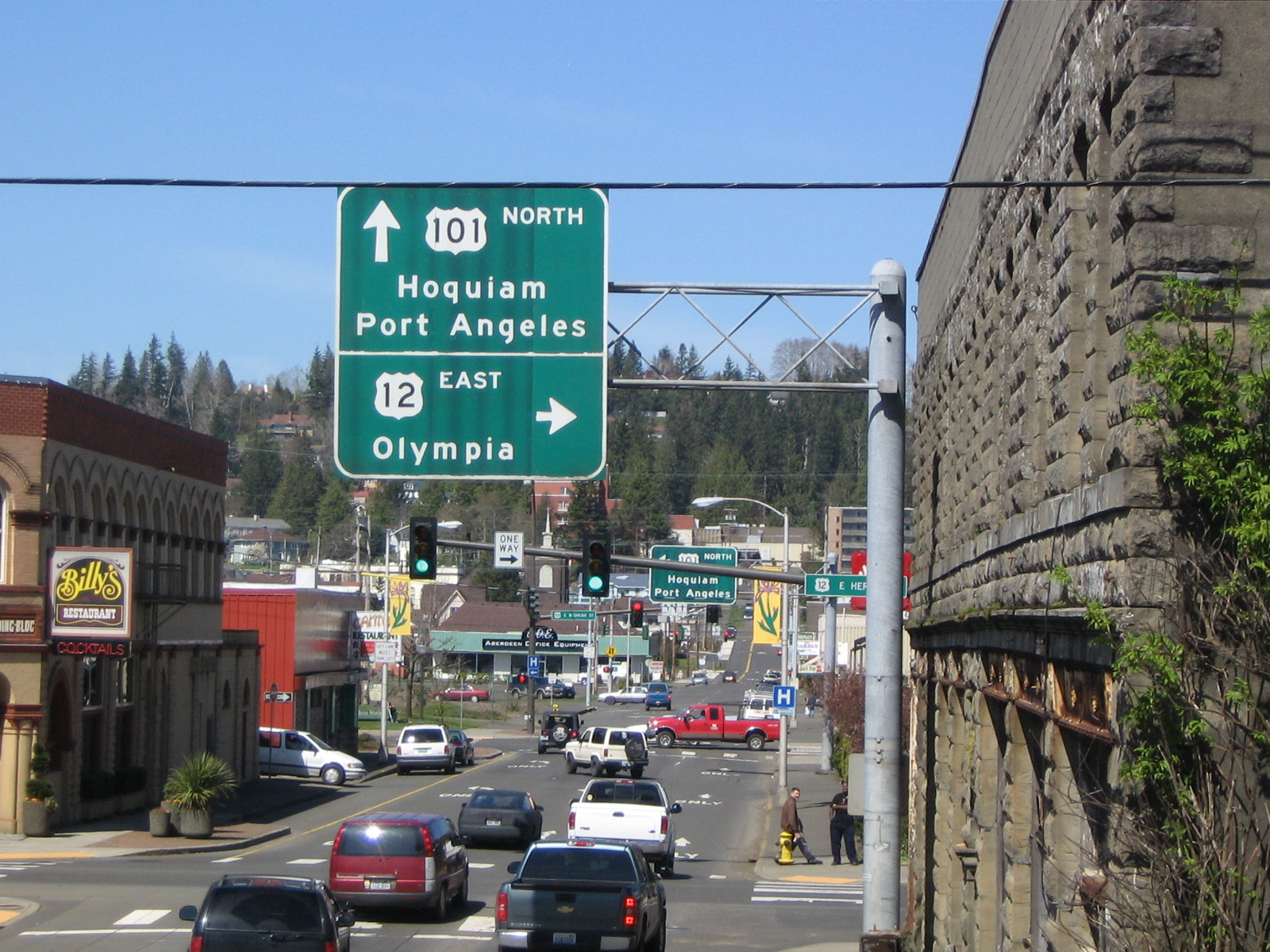
US 101 at US 12 in downtown Aberdeen

US 101 crosses the Chehalis River into downtown Aberdeen, where it intersects State Street in a partial interchange and is split for two blocks between South G Street for northbound traffic and South H Street for southbound traffic. The highway intersects the western end of US 12, which crosses Washington state and continues to Detroit, Michigan, and turns west onto another pair of one-way streets: East Wishkah Street for westbound traffic and East Heron Street for eastbound traffic. US 101 continues through Aberdeen and its residential neighborhoods, turning northwest onto Alder and Park streets and west onto Sumner and Simpson avenues before it enters Hoquiam.

Approaching downtown Hoquiam, the highway splits into another pair of one-way streets divided by the Hoquiam River: westbound traffic uses Riverside Avenue and avoids the downtown business district, while eastbound traffic travels through it on Simpson Avenue. The streets reunite north of downtown Hoquiam at a junction with SR 109, which continues along the Pacific Coast to Ocean Shores and Taholah. US 101 continues north on Lincoln Street and turns west onto Perry Avenue before crossing the Little Hoquiam River and intersecting the eastern end of SR 109 Spur. The highway continues north along the West Fork Hoquiam River into the foothills of the Olympic Mountains.

US 101 leaves the foothills by turning west and travels across the Axford Prairie near Humptulips. The highway crosses the Humptulips River near a state fish hatchery and continues north into the Olympic National Forest. US 101 skirts the west edge of the Quinault Ridge of the Olympic Mountains and turns west at Lake Quinault to enter the Quinault Indian Reservation near Amanda Park. The highway travels on the southwest side of the lake, crossing the Quinault River, and provides access to several recreational areas in the nearby Olympic National Park, including the Quinault Rainforest. It then turns west, following the Salmon River into Jefferson County before briefly re-entering Grays Harbor County to the south. US 101 turns north into Jefferson County before crossing the Queets River and beginning a 15-mile (24 km) stretch on the Pacific Coast.

The highway leaves the Quinault Indian Reservation and enters Olympic National Park, where it serves several beaches around Kalaloch and designated campsites facing the Pacific Ocean. US 101 turns northeast at Ruby Beach and follows the Hoh River inland as it leaves the national park. The highway turns north to cross the Hoh River and traverses a short pair of hairpin turns before passing the main entrance road to the Hoh Rainforest, one of the largest old-growth temperate rainforests in the Western Hemisphere. US 101 continues northwest and descends into the Forks Prairie by following the Bogachiel River to the city of Forks in Clallam County, where it turns northeast to travel through downtown. After leaving Forks, the highway intersects SR 110, a scenic route along the Sol Duc River that provides access to La Push and the Quileute Indian Reservation.

US 101 continues northeast through the Sol Duc Valley, turning east after passing Lake Pleasant at Beaver and intersecting SR 113, which travels north towards Clallam Bay. The highway continues east along the Sol Duc River and re-enters Olympic National Park near the west end of Lake Crescent. US 101 hugs the south shore of the lake, where it passes several trailheads and the Lake Crescent Lodge before leaving the national park at the east end of Lake Crescent. It then travels around Lake Sutherland and follows the Indian Creek east to its mouth at the Elwha River. After crossing the Elwha River, the highway turns northeast to follow the river along the former Lake Aldwell, which was drained following the removal of the Elwha Dam. US 101 then intersects SR 112, which continues west towards the Makah Indian Reservation at the northwest corner of the contiguous United States, and turns east to enter Port Angeles.

=== Port Angeles to Olympia ===
The highway travels east through the industrial outskirts of Port Angeles, where it passes William R. Fairchild International Airport and an interchange with SR 117, a truck route with direct access to the city's waterfront. US 101 crosses over Tumwater and Valley creeks and enters the residential neighborhoods as Lauridsen Boulevard before turning north onto South Lincoln Street. Lauridsen continues east to the Olympic National Park headquarters, the north end of the road to Hurricane Ridge, and the Peninsula College campus. Lincoln Street continues into downtown Port Angeles and terminates near a ferry terminal serving the MV Coho, which connects to Victoria, British Columbia, Canada. US 101 turns east and leaves downtown Port Angeles on Front and First streets, which merge into a four-lane road near the city's golf course. The highway then continues through a suburban commercial district and traverses a series of turns to cross a valley formed by Morse Creek.

US 101 travels east onto a divided highway along a plain that faces the Strait of Juan de Fuca. After crossing the Dungeness River, the highway bypasses Sequim on a two-lane expressway with three interchanges. It then turns southeast to follow Sequim Bay and the Olympic Discovery Trail to Blyn on the Jamestown S'Klallam Indian Reservation at the head of the bay. US 101 turns northeast and crosses the Miller Peninsula, re-entering Jefferson County in the process. The highway turns south at Discovery Bay and reaches the head of the bay at a junction with the west end of SR 20, which crosses Washington state via the North Cascades and Okanogan Highlands. US 101 then follows Snow Creek south to an interchange with SR 104, which crosses the Hood Canal Bridge to the Kitsap Peninsula, and passes a series of lakes in the eastern foothills of the Olympic Mountains.

The highway continues south through Quilcene and re-enters the Olympic National Forest, where it turns southwest to travel around Mount Walker. US 101 traverses a small pass at 750 feet (230 m) above sea level and begins a southeastern descent along Spencer Creek to reach Dabob Bay on Hood Canal. The highway leaves the national forest and follows the bay and canal south through Brinnon and a trio of state parks: Dosewallips, Pleasant Harbor, and Triton Cove. US 101 then enters Mason County and continues past several resorts and campsites to Hoodsport, where it intersects SR 119, which provides access to Lake Cushman. The highway passes Potlatch State Park before reaching the Skokomish Indian Reservation, where it intersects SR 106 at a bend in Hood Canal.

From Skokomish, US 101 continues south along Purdy Creek and intersects SR 102 near Sanderson Field and the Washington Corrections Center. It then becomes a two-lane expressway that bypasses Shelton, which it serves via a series of interchanges and a junction with SR 3, the main highway of the Kitsap Peninsula. US 101 expands into a four-lane divided highway south of Shelton and continues to Kamilche on the Squaxin Island Indian Reservation, where it has an interchange with SR 108. The highway follows Oyster Bay and Scheider Creek southeast to the Eld Inlet in Thurston County, where it turns south and approaches a partial interchange with SR 8, which continues west toward Aberdeen. US 101 then becomes a freeway with full grade separation for the remainder of its route, continuing southeast into Olympia.

The freeway crosses Mud Bay and intersects an access road for the Evergreen State College campus on the western outskirts of Olympia. US 101 then traverses suburban neighborhoods, where it passes the Capital Mall and South Puget Sound Community College, and expands to six lanes. The highway turns southeast on the shore of Capitol Lake and enters Tumwater, where US 101 terminates at an interchange with I-5 near the Washington State Capitol campus.

== History ==
US 101 was established as part of the initial United States Numbered Highway System adopted by the American Association of State Highway Officials (AASHO, now the AASHTO) on November 11, 1926. Two state roads directly preceded US 101: State Road 9 and State Road 12, both part of the first state system established in the 20th century. They were numbered in 1923 and incorporated into US 101, which was co-signed with the two routes.

The final section of the Olympic Loop Highway began construction in 1927 and was opened to traffic with a two-day dedication ceremony in August 1931. It cost approximately $11 million to construct, using state and federal funds. In 1937, the state legislature established a new system of primary and secondary highways. State Road 9 became Primary State Highway 9 (PSH 9), while State Road 12 became PSH 12; both remained co-signed with US 101. The Washington State Highway Commission submitted an application to AASHO in 1955 to extend US 101 northeast from Discovery Bay to Whidbey Island and Mount Vernon, where it would terminate at US 99. The proposal was rejected by AASHO for being too long of a detour and including a tolled ferry crossing.

In January 1964, the Washington State Legislature approved a new state route system with no branches or secondary route with lettered suffixes. PSH 9 and PSH 12 became part of U.S. Route 101 with no co-designation and parts of them became other new state routes.

A freeway bypass of Shelton with several interchange was proposed by the state government in the 1960s; its construction would require the relocation of radio station KMAS and 10 residences. Work on the 4.3-mile (6.9 km) bypass began on August 9, 1972, and was completed two years later at a cost of $4 million. US 101 was rerouted onto the freeway—which initially had two lanes—on October 11, 1974, and SR 3 was extended to a new interchange over the former alignment. The Sequim section was relocated to a new bypass on April 18, 1999. It cost $40.7 million (equivalent to $71.8 million in 2024 dollars) to construct and included the installation of warning signals triggered by the presence of nearby Roosevelt elk wearing radio collars for tracking.

== Major intersections ==
US 101 is signed north–south from the Oregon state line to Sappho, east–west from Sappho to SR 20 in Discovery Bay, and north–south from SR 20 to I-5 in Tumwater.

County	Location	mi	km	Destinations	Notes
Columbia River		0.00– 0.44	0.00– 0.71	US 101 south	Continuation into Oregon
Columbia River		0.00– 0.44	0.00– 0.71	Astoria–Megler Bridge	
Pacific	Megler	0.46	0.74	SR 401 north / Lewis and Clark Trail – Raymond, Longview	
Pacific	Ilwaco	9.41	15.14	US 101 Alt. north – Raymond, Aberdeen	
Pacific	Ilwaco	11.57	18.62	SR 100 loop (North Head Road) / Lewis and Clark Trail – Cape Disappointment State Park	
Pacific	Seaview	13.38	21.53	SR 103 north (Pacific Way) – Long Beach, Ocean Park	
Pacific		15.75	25.35	US 101 Alt. south – Astoria, Oregon	
Pacific		28.89	46.49	SR 4 east – Longview, Kelso	
Pacific	Raymond	58.48	94.11	SR 6 east – Chehalis	
Pacific	Raymond	59.40	95.60	SR 105 north – Grayland, Westport	
Grays Harbor		76.69	123.42	SR 107 north – Montesano	
Grays Harbor	Aberdeen	82.67	133.04	SR 105 Spur south (Boone Street) – Westport	
Grays Harbor	Aberdeen	82.82	133.29	SR 105 south – Westport, Grayland	
Grays Harbor	Aberdeen	83.27	134.01	State Avenue	Interchange, northbound exit and southbound entrance
Grays Harbor	Aberdeen	83.37– 83.43	134.17– 134.27	US 12 east (Heron Street) – Olympia	Western terminus of US 12
Grays Harbor	Hoquiam	87.26	140.43	SR 109 north (Emerson Avenue) – Ocean Shores, Taholah	
Grays Harbor	Hoquiam	88.62	142.62	SR 109 Spur north – Ocean Shores, Ocean City	
Jefferson	No major junctions				
Grays Harbor	No major junctions				
Jefferson		177.90	286.30	Upper Hoh Road – Olympic National Park, Hoh Rainforest	
Clallam	Forks	192.54	309.86	SR 110 west (La Push Road) – Olympic National Park, Pacific Coast, Mora, La Push	
Clallam	Sappho	203.28	327.15	SR 113 north (Burnt Mountain Road) to SR 112 – Clallam Bay, Neah Bay, Northwest Coast	Sign change from north-south to east-west
Clallam		241.89	389.28	SR 112 west (Strait of Juan de Fuca Highway) – Sekiu, Neah Bay	
Clallam	Port Angeles	245.53	395.14	SR 117 north (Tumwater Truck Route) to US 101 east	Interchange, northbound exit and southbound entrance
Clallam	Port Angeles	247.40	398.15	East Front Street, East 1st Street – B.C. Ferry	
Clallam	Port Angeles	248.09	399.26	Race Street – Olympic National Park, Hurricane Ridge	Former SR 111
Clallam	West end of limited access				
Clallam	Sequim	262.29	422.11	River Road – Sequim City Center	Interchange
Clallam	Sequim	263.80	424.54	Sequim Avenue – Sequim City Center	Interchange
Clallam	Sequim	265.36	427.06	Simdars Road / Washington Street – Sequim City Center	Northbound entrance and southbound exit
Clallam	East end of limited access				
Jefferson	Discovery Bay	281.60	453.19	SR 20 east – Port Townsend	Sign change from east-west to north-south
Jefferson		284.17	457.33	SR 104 east – Kingston	Partial interchange
Mason	Hoodsport	330.77	532.32	SR 119 north (Lake Cushman Road) – Cushman–Staircase Recreation Area	
Mason	Skokomish	336.03	540.79	SR 106 east – Union, Belfair	
Mason		342.47	551.15	SR 102 west (Dayton Airport Road) – Washington State Patrol Academy, Washington Corrections Center	
Mason	North end of limited access				
Mason	Shelton	344.15	553.86	Wallace Kneeland Boulevard	
Mason	Shelton	345.85	556.59	Shelton-Matlock Road – Shelton City Center, Matlock	
Mason		348.21	560.39	SR 3 north – Shelton, Bremerton	
Mason	Kamilche	351.77	566.12	SR 108 west – McCleary	
Thurston		358.08	576.27	Steamboat Island Road – Steamboat Island	
Thurston		359.67	578.83	SR 8 west – Montesano, Aberdeen	Northbound entrance and southbound exit
Thurston		360.74	580.55	2nd Avenue Southwest	
Thurston		362.10	582.74	Evergreen Parkway, Mud Bay Road – The Evergreen State College	Northbound entrance and southbound exit
Thurston	Olympia	363.59	585.14	Black Lake Boulevard – West Olympia	
Thurston	Olympia	364.57	586.72	Cooper Point Road / Automall Drive Southwest / Crosby Boulevard	
Thurston	Tumwater	365.55	588.30	I-5 – Olympia, Seattle, Tumwater, Portland	Northern terminus
1.000 mi = 1.609 km; 1.000 km = 0.621 mi: Incomplete access

== Alternate route ==
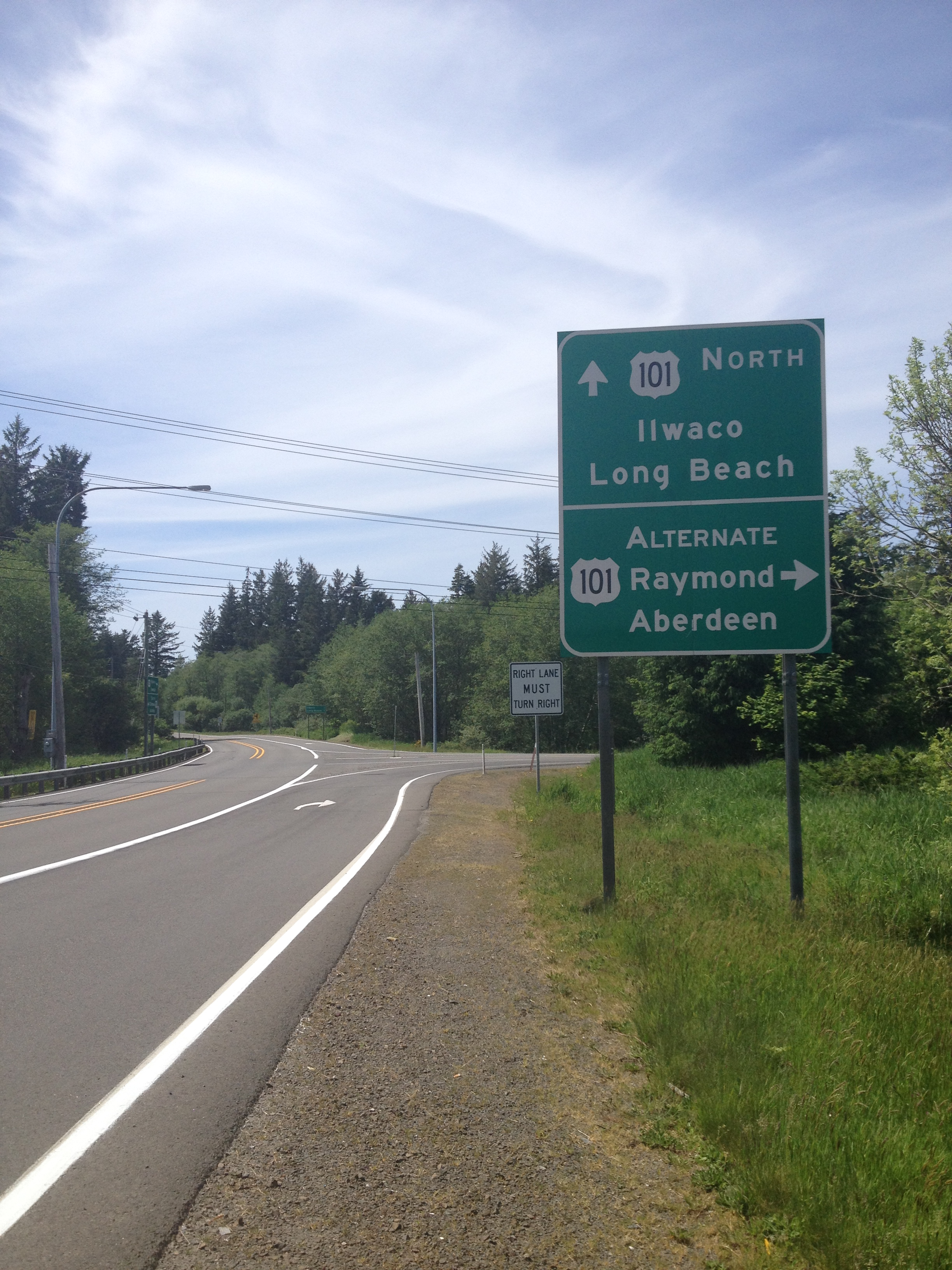
Sign for Alternate US 101 near Long Beach, Washington

U.S. Route 101 Alternate
- Location: Ilwaco, Washington
- Length: 0.63 mi (1,010 m)
- Existed: 1937–present

US 101 has a designated alternate route east of Ilwaco that bypasses the main highway, which instead continues in a loop to serve Ilwaco and Seaview. It is 0.63 miles (1.01 km) long and travels north–south between two junctions with US 101 on a two-lane highway.

The alternate route was constructed in 1931 as the Skinville Cutoff and added to the state highway system in 1937 as a branch of PSH 12, which was co-signed with the southwestern portion of US 101. The highway was not fully recognized as US 101 Alternate by the AASHTO until approval in their October 2006 meeting. In 2016, it was used by a daily average of 4,200 vehicles according to a survey by WSDOT.

U.S. Route 101
Previous state: Oregon	Washington	Next state: Terminus
