= Washington State Route 8 =

Highway in Washington

State Route 8
- SR 8 highlighted in red

Route information
- Maintained by WSDOT
- Length: 20.67 mi (33.27 km)
- Existed: 1964–present

Major junctions
- West end: US 12 in Elma
- SR 108 in McCleary
- East end: US 101 near Olympia

Location
- Country: United States
- State: Washington
- Counties: Grays Harbor, Thurston

Highway system
- State highways in Washington; Interstate; US; State; Scenic; Pre-1964; 1964 renumbering; Former
← SR 7	→ SR 9

State Route 8 (SR 8) is a state highway in Grays Harbor and Thurston counties, of the U.S. state of Washington. It extends 20.67 miles (33.27 km) from U.S. Route 12 (US 12) in the city of Elma, east to an interchange with US 101 about 5.90 miles (9.50 km) northwest of the state capital, Olympia. SR 8 intersects SR 108 west of McCleary. The route connects Elma and Olympia as part of a corridor between Aberdeen and the Puget Sound region.

The highway was part of the Elma – Grand Mound branch of Primary State Highway 9 (PSH 9 EG) from 1937 until 1964, which ran from Elma southeast to Interstate 5 (I-5), formerly US 99 in Grand Mound, which was later added as part of US 12 in 1967. The road also forms the northern boundary of Capitol State Forest in Thurston County.

== Route description ==
SR 8 runs 20.67 miles (33.27 km) east from US 12 in Elma to an interchange with US 101 5.90 miles (9.50 km) northwest of Olympia. The route links the city of Elma with Olympia, and intersects only one other highway, SR 108, in McCleary. WSDOT has found that more than 17,000 motorists utilize the road daily at the interchange with US 101 based on annual average daily traffic (AADT) data.

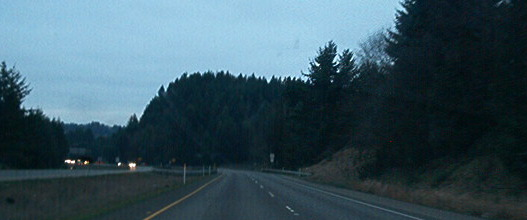
The expressway portion of SR 8 going eastbound towards US 101.

SR 8 starts at an interchange with US 12 near downtown Elma. From the interchange, the expressway goes northeast and starts to parallel the Chehalis River. After crossing the river twice, the highway intersects SR 108, which goes northeast towards Kamilche, west of McCleary. After passing Downtown McCleary, SR 8 has a partial cloverleaf interchange with Mox Chehalis Road. From the interchange, the expressway goes east to form the northern boundary of the Capitol State Forest, and passes Summit Lake. From Summit Lake, the highway turns northeast and merges with US 101 southbound.

The entire length of SR 8 is expressway. When combined with US 12 to the west and US 101 to the east, it serves as the primary connection between the Puget Sound region and Washington's Pacific coast.

== History ==
The shield of PSH 9 EG.

Before the Primary and Secondary system, SR 8 in 1923 was part of a branch of State Road 9, from Elma to Grand Mound. Later, in 1937, the route from Elma to Grand Mound became part of Elma – Grand Mound branch of Primary State Highway 9 (PSH 9 EG). PSH 9 EG became SR 8 in 1964 during the 1964 highway renumbering, in which the Washington State Department of Transportation (WSDOT) replaced the previous system of Primary and Secondary Highways with a new system called State Routes, which is still in use today. The highway became part of the Ocean Freeway, an expressway that aimed to connect Aberdeen and the Pacific Coast with Olympia in the 1960s. The first section between McCleary and Mud Bay opened in October 1962 and was followed a year later by an extension to Elma. The 3-mile (4.8 km) freeway bypass of Elma opened in June 1965 as part of US 410.

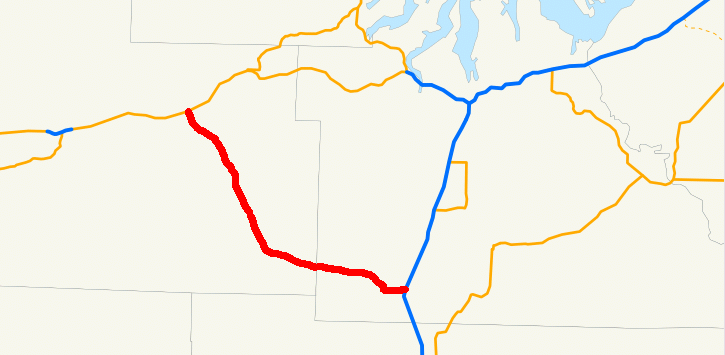
A map showing SR 8 in 1964, when the highway went from Elma to Grand Mound.

Later in 1967, US 12 was extended from Lewiston, Idaho westward to Aberdeen. It was approved on June 20, 1967, and it replaced the route of US 410, therefore making the highway obsolete. Since US 12 used the all-weather White Pass and SR 8 from Elma to Grand Mound, and US 410 used Chinook Pass, which was closed during the winter, US 12 bypassed US 410 and what is now SR 8. Signs were changed in late December 1967, and the bypassed segments of US 410 became a new SR 8.

During the Winter 2007 storm, a slope that held up SR 8 was eroded by floodwaters. The slope, located on SR 8 west of the US 101 interchange, and is scheduled to begin this season and last 2 months. In 2010, WSDOT aims to rebuild the columns that support the SR 8/US 101 interchange and reduce the risk of failure in an earthquake, such as the 2001 Nisqually earthquake.

== Major intersections ==
County	Location	mi	km	Destinations	Notes
Grays Harbor	Elma	0.00	0.00	US 12 west – Montesano, Aberdeen	Continues as US 12 west
Grays Harbor	Elma	0.00	0.00	US 12 east – Oakville, Centralia, Yakima	Interchange; westbound exit and eastbound entrance
Grays Harbor	McCleary	6.03	9.70	SR 108 east / SR 108 Bus. east – McCleary, Shelton	
Grays Harbor	McCleary	7.39	11.89	SR 108 Bus. west (Mox Chehalis Road) – McCleary	Interchange
Thurston		20.67	33.27	US 101 south – Olympia	Interchange; eastbound exit and westbound entrance
1.000 mi = 1.609 km; 1.000 km = 0.621 mi: Route transition
