= Timberland Regional Library =

Public library system in Washington

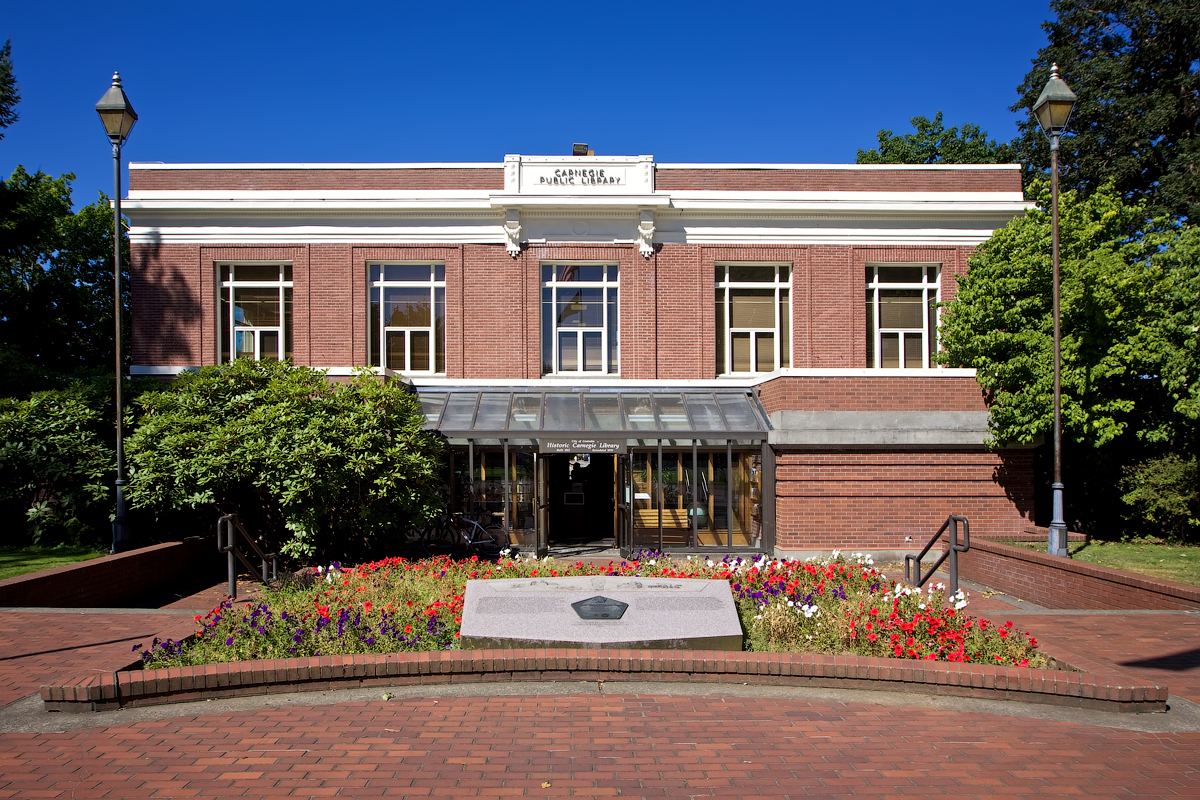
- Centralia branch in Lewis County
- 47°02′38″N 122°49′21″W
- Location: Western Washington, U.S.
- Type: Public library
- Established: 1968
- Branches: 27 locations

Collection
- Size: 1.2 million items

Access and use
- Circulation: 4.5 million
- Population served: 496,075
- Members: 240,508

Other information
- Director: Andrea Heisel (interim)
- Employees: 250
- Website: trl.org
- References: Washington Public Library Statistical Report, 2016

Timberland Regional Library (TRL) is a public library system serving the residents of western Washington state, United States including Grays Harbor, Lewis, Mason, Pacific, and Thurston counties. Timberland Regional Library has 27 community libraries, 2 cooperative library centers, and 3 library kiosks. The library was founded in 1968, following a four-year demonstration project; it is funded through property taxes and timber taxes.

== History ==
A two-year demonstration library system, the Timberland Library Demonstration (TLD), was established in 1964 to serve Grays Harbor, Lewis, Mason, Pacific, and Thurston counties, using $310,000 in funds from the federal Library Services and Construction Act and local sources. Each of the counties had cities with independent library systems and several rural library districts, including the Grays Harbor County Rural Library District and South Puget Sound Regional Library, who chose to either join or opt out of the demonstration project. The Timberland Library Demonstration relied on the Washington State Library to process its books, which were also stored in municipal libraries. The system debuted its bookmobile in September 1964, based in Centralia and traveling on ten routes between rural areas in all five counties. The formation of a permanent library district would require a public vote, which was pushed back from 1966 to 1968, waiting for a more favorable general election. The South Puget Sound Regional Library, which comprised Mason and Thurston counties, threatened to leave the demonstration later in 1966 over the effectiveness of the program for their counties. After months of negotiation, the two counties reversed their decision, allowing the demonstration project to continue for another two years.

On November 5, 1968, residents of unincorporated areas in the five counties approved the establishment of an intercounty rural library district, with four counties having large margins in favor of the library. The Timberland Regional Library became the state's third intercounty district, following the North Central Regional Library in northeastern Washington and the Sno-Isle Regional Library in the northern Puget Sound area. The new library formed its board the following month and opened its headquarters at the 1914 Carnegie library in Olympia. In the 1980s and 1990s, the district expanded and built several new branches in rural communities with funding from strong timber sales.

=== Library relocations ===
On October 21, 1996, the North Mason branch in Belfair was divided into three sections and shipped 16 miles (26 km) by barge on Hood Canal to Hoodsport to be reused as the new building for their branch. The move was chosen due to its cost savings compared to construction of a new building and demolition of the North Mason building, which was due to be replaced. The Hoodsport branch opened in March 1997, following renovations and the replacement of the roof. The new building for the North Mason branch opened in March 1998 after a year of construction.

The TRL proposed a similar building swap in 2023 to relocate the Amanda Park branch to Randle, 153 miles (246 km) to the east. The Amanda Park branch had served a small population with a severe decrease of book holds and physical checkouts since 2011, while Randle was due to receive a new building that would cost $1.8 million to construct.

=== 2009 ballot measure ===
On February 3, 2009, approximately 53% of voters within TRL's five-county district turned down "Levy Lid Lift Proposition 1" in a special election. This proposition would have lifted the 34.5-cent (per thousand dollars of assessed valuation) cap on TRL's property tax levy rate. As a result, the Library Board determined that approximately 2.5 million dollars would need to be cut from TRL's 2010 budget.

== Branches ==
The Timberland Regional Library system has 27 community libraries and four kiosks serving most cities in its five-county area. The cities of Morton, Mossyrock, Napavine, Ocean Shores, Pe Ell, and Vader are not part of the library's district. TRL also offers access to information services via online reference databases, library catalog, toll-free telephone 6 days a week as well as many other resources 24 hours a day 7 days a week. Ebooks and digital audiobooks, provided by the digital distributor OverDrive, can be downloaded from the library's website.

- Aberdeen
- Amanda Park
- Belfair (North Mason)
- Centralia
- Chehalis
- Elma
- Hoodsport
- Hoquiam
- Ilwaco
- Lacey
- McCleary
- Montesano
- Naselle
- Nisqually Tribal Library (kiosk only)
- Oakville
- Ocean Park
- Olympia
- Packwood
- Rainier (book drop only)
- Randle (Mountain View)
- Raymond
- Salkum
- Shelton
- South Bend
- Tenino
- Tokeland (Shoalwater Bay Tribal Community Library)
- Toledo (kiosk only)
- Tumwater
- Westport
- Winlock
- Yelm

== Zine collection ==
The Olympia branch has a special collection of zines, many created by local authors. There were over 2,000 zines in the collection as of 2016.

== Reciprocal library systems ==
TRL participates in reciprocal borrowing agreements with the following public library systems in Washington State. Under this program, TRL cardholders can obtain free accounts at these library systems, and vice versa.

- Fort Vancouver Regional Library District (Clark, Klickitat, Skamania Counties)
- King County Library System
- Kitsap Regional Library
- Longview Public Library
- North Central Regional Library (Okanogan, Chelan, Douglas, Ferry, Grant Counties)
- North Olympic Library System (Clallam County)
- Pierce County Library
- Seattle Public Library
- Sno-Isle Regional Library System (Snohomish, Island Counties)
- Whatcom County Library System
