= Lake Cushman, Washington =

Unincorporated community in Washington, United States

- Unincorporated community
- Location within Washington (state) Location within the United States
- Coordinates: 47°25′18″N 123°13′18″W
- Country: United States
- State: Washington
- County: Mason
- Time zone: UTC-8 (Pacific (PST))
  - Summer (DST): UTC-7 (PDT)

Lake Cushman is an unincorporated community on the shores of Lake Cushman in Mason County, Washington, United States. It is also known as Cushman, and is sometimes considered part of the town of Hoodsport. It also features the Skokomish campground and boat launch. The Lake Cushman community also features Dow Creek RV park and a small grocery store.
