= Washington State Route 108 =

State highway in Washington, United States

State Route 108
- Old Olympic Highway
- SR 108 highlighted in red

Route information
- Auxiliary route of US 101
- Maintained by WSDOT
- Length: 11.96 mi (19.25 km)
- Existed: 1964–present

Major junctions
- West end: SR 8 in McCleary
- East end: US 101 in Kamilche

Location
- Country: United States
- State: Washington
- Counties: Grays Harbor, Mason

Highway system
- State highways in Washington; Interstate; US; State; Scenic; Pre-1964; 1964 renumbering; Former
← SR 107	→ SR 109

State Route 108 (SR 108, also known as the Old Olympic Highway) is a state highway in Grays Harbor and Mason counties, of the U.S. state of Washington. It extends 20.67 miles (33.27 km) from SR 8 in the city of McCleary, east to an interchange with U.S. Route 101 (US 101) in Kamilche. The route serves as a bypass and connects McCleary with Shelton, and Port Angeles.

The highway was Secondary State Highway 9D (SSH 9D) from 1937 until 1964, which ran from McCleary to Kamilche.

== Route description ==
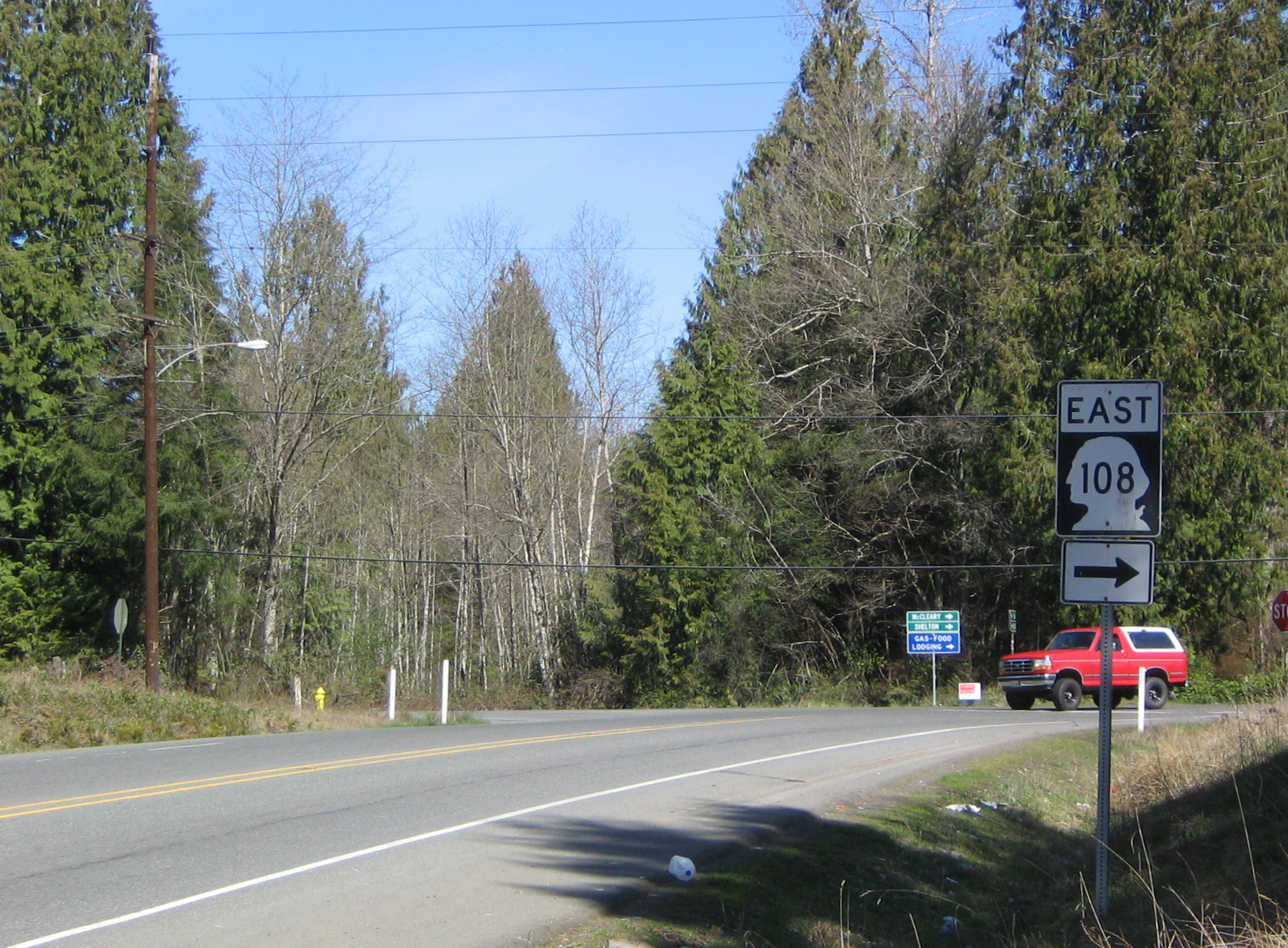
State Route 108 near its western terminus near McCleary

SR 108 begins at an intersection with SR 8, an east–west expressway across the Olympic Peninsula, west of McCleary in Grays Harbor County. The highway briefly travels north before turning east onto West Simpson Avenue towards the city. SR 108 passes through downtown McCleary before turning north onto Summit Road at South 3rd Street, where its business route splits to head south. The highway travels around the Simpson Door Company factory and leaves the city before turning off Summit Road to follow the Puget Sound and Pacific Railroad.

The highway and railroad travel northeast into Mason County and continues into the Kamilche Valley. SR 108 turns east to follow Skookum Creek but resumes its northeastern course while passing Kamilche Hill. After crossing over the railroad at the east end of the valley, the highway enters the community of Kamilche on the Squaxin Island Reservation, passing the tribe's golf course and the Little Creek Casino Resort. SR 108 terminates at an interchange with US 101, which continues as a freeway towards Shelton and Olympia.

SR 108, also named the Old Olympic Highway, functions as a bypass of SR 8 for travel between Aberdeen and the eastern Olympic Peninsula. The highway is maintained by the Washington State Department of Transportation (WSDOT), who conduct an annual survey of traffic volume that is expressed in terms of annual average daily traffic (AADT), a measure of traffic volume for any average day of the year. Average daily traffic volumes on SR 108 in 2016 ranged from a minimum of 2,900 vehicles at Summit Road to a maximum of 12,000 vehicles near the US 101 interchange.

== History ==
The shield of SSH 9D.

When the Primary and Secondary Highways were formed in 1937, the current SR 108 became Secondary State Highway 9D (SSH 9D). It was extended west through McCleary to the new bypass for US 410 (now SR 8), which opened in October 1962. SSH 9D became SR 108 in 1964 during the 1964 highway renumbering, in which the Washington State Department of Transportation (WSDOT) replaced the previous system of Primary and Secondary Highways with a new system called State Routes, which is still in use today.

Originally, a 1.25 mile northern bypass of McCleary, extending northeast from the existing SR 108 Elma McCleary Rd Intersection to the SR 108 Summit Road Intersection was proposed during construction of Secondary State Highway 9D. This route would have been a limited access, full control 2-lane highway. However, beyond establishing a roadway centerline, no further action has been taken to complete this bypass.

In early 2017, the intersection of SR 8 and SR 108 was temporarily closed for two years for a fish passage barrier replacement. The project included the installation of four bridges over the Middle and East forks of Wildcat Creek, at a cost of $14 million. The intersection reopened in October 2018. A separate project to replace fish culverts with passable structures at several points along SR 108 is scheduled to begin in 2023.

== Business route ==
State Route 108 Business
- Location: McCleary, Washington
- Length: 1.3 mi (2.1 km)

SR 108 has a short business route serving McCleary, running concurrent to SR 108 on West Simpson Avenue before turning south on South 3rd Street towards an interchange with SR 8.

== Major intersections ==
County	Location	mi	km	Destinations	Notes
Grays Harbor	McCleary	0.00	0.00	SR 8 – Elma, Olympia	West end of SR 108 Business overlap
Grays Harbor	McCleary	1.11	1.79	SR 108 Bus. east (South 3rd Street)	East end of SR 108 Business overlap
Mason	Kamilche	11.96	19.25	US 101 – Port Angeles, Olympia	
1.000 mi = 1.609 km; 1.000 km = 0.621 mi
