= Noah Ashenhurst =

American novelist

- Born: 1972 (age 53–54)
- Education: Western Washington University; University of Colorado (MFA); Pacific Lutheran University
- Writing career
- Genre: Novelist/fiction writer
- Notable work: Comfort Food
- Notable awards: Independent Publisher Book Award (Comfort Food, 2006)
- Website: noahashenhurst.com

Noah Ashenhurst (born 1972) is the author of the novel Comfort Food which won the 2006 Independent Publisher Book Award for Best Regional Fiction (West-Pacific). The novel is set primarily in the Pacific Northwest and deals with six characters who struggle to find their place and purpose in the world.

His short fiction has appeared in Beyond the Margins: A Literature and Art Magazine, apparatus magazine:a literary journal from the internal machine, Brittle Star, Write This, and Absinthe Revival.

Ashenhurst grew up in Boulder, Colorado where he attended Boulder High School. He attended Western Washington University and the University of Colorado. He earned his MFA from Rainier Writing Workshop, Pacific Lutheran University, and is writing his second novel.

He has worked in a salmon cannery in Alaska, has traveled to Budapest and Prague, and remodeled houses in Boulder. He currently lives in Mason County, Washington. He taught English and creative writing at North Mason High School in Belfair, WA and is now an online English teacher in Olympia, Washington.
