= Washington State Route 119 =

State highway in Mason County, Washington, US

State Route 119
- Lake Cushman Road
- SR 119 highlighted in red

Route information
- Auxiliary route of US 101
- Maintained by WSDOT
- Length: 10.93 mi (17.59 km)
- Existed: 1991–present

Major junctions
- South end: US 101 in Hoodsport
- North end: FH 24 in Olympic National Forest

Location
- Country: United States
- State: Washington
- Counties: Mason

Highway system
- State highways in Washington; Interstate; US; State; Scenic; Pre-1964; 1964 renumbering; Former
| ← SR 117 | → SR 121 |

State Route 119 (SR 119) is a 10.93-mile-long (17.59 km) state highway in the U.S. state of Washington, serving Lake Cushman in Mason County within Olympic National Forest. The highway, known locally as Lake Cushman Road, travels northwest into the Olympic Mountains from U.S. Route 101 (US 101) in Hoodsport to Lake Cushman and ends at a gravel road east of the entrance to Olympic National Park on Forest Highway 24 (FFH-24). A gravel road connecting Lake Cushman to the state highway system has existed since the late 1950s and was codified into the current state highway system in 1991, prior to being completely paved by 1999.

== Route description ==
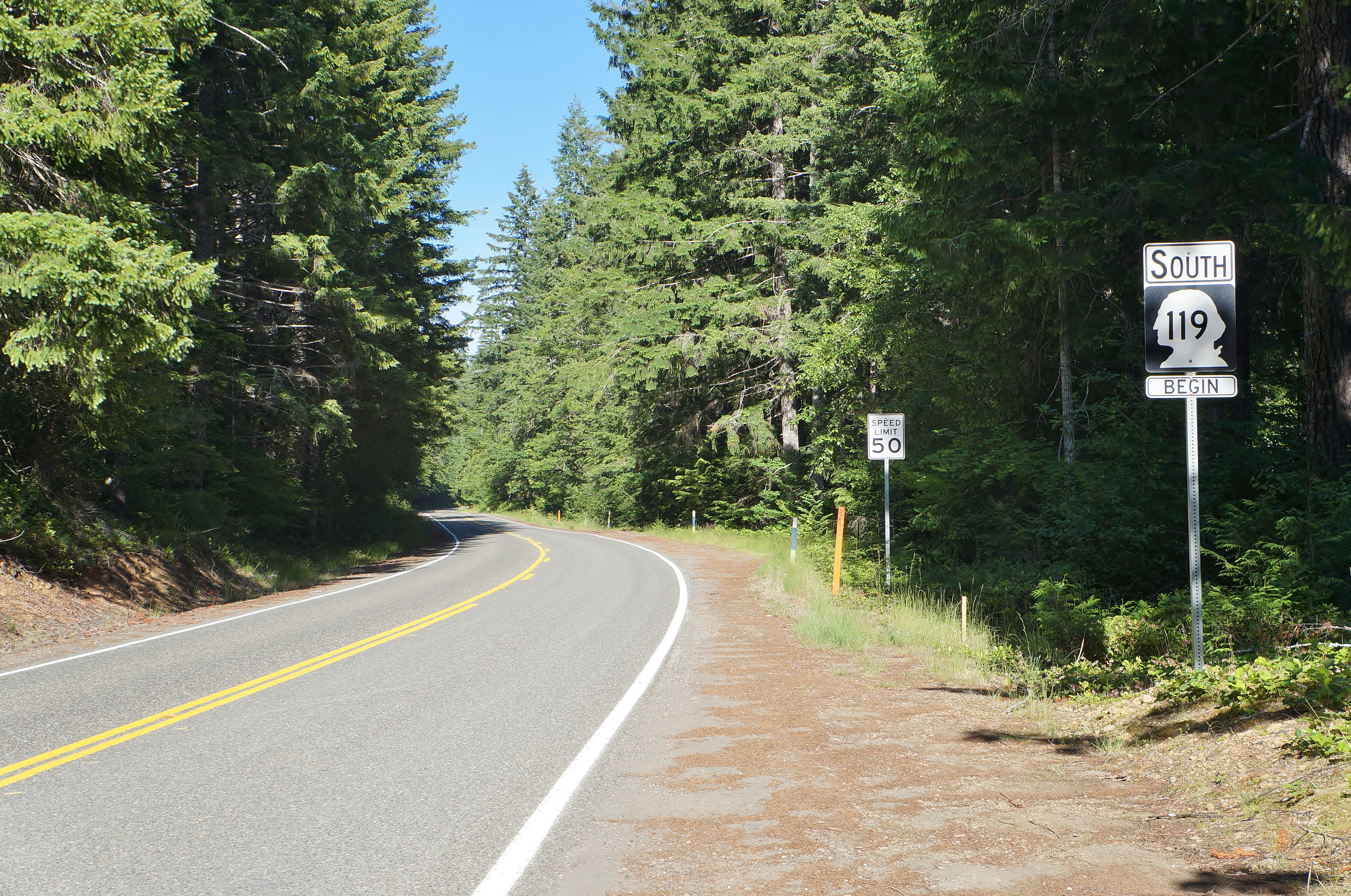
Looking southbound at SR 119's northern terminus at Lake Cushman

SR 119 begins at an intersection with US 101 in the unincorporated community of Hoodsport, located on the Hood Canal in Mason County. The highway travels west along Finch Creek as Lake Cushman Road into the Olympic Mountains and passes through Hoodsport Community Trail Park, a former state park. SR 119 continues north along the coast of Lake Cushman and Big Creek into Olympic National Forest, where it begins a concurrency with FFH-24 on Staircase Road heading northwest. The concurrent highways travel west along Lake Cushman as SR 119 ends at the entrance to Olympic National Park and the end of pavement.

Every year, the Washington State Department of Transportation (WSDOT) conducts a series of surveys on its highways in the state to measure traffic volume. This is expressed in terms of annual average daily traffic (AADT), which is a measure of traffic volume for any average day of the year. In 2011, WSDOT calculated that between 340 and 2,600 vehicles per day used the highway, mostly on the shores of Lake Cushman.

== History ==
A two-lane gravel road connecting Lake Cushman to Hoodsport was first constructed in the late 1950s as a basic gravel road, later upgraded to a paved roadway between Hoodsport and Big Creek Campground by 1965. The highway between Hoodsport and the boundary of Olympic National Park was transferred to state control by Mason County. It was incorporated into the state highway system in 1991 as SR 119, a child route of US 101, and the last segment between Big Creek and the park boundary was paved in 1999.

== Major intersections ==
The entire highway is in Mason County.

| Location | mi | km | Destinations | Notes |
|---|---|---|---|---|
| Hoodsport | 0.00 | 0.00 | US 101 – Shelton, Port Angeles | Southern terminus |
| Olympic National Forest | 9.28 | 14.93 | FH 24 east (Staircase Road) | South end of FFH 24 overlap |
| Olympic National Forest | 10.93 | 17.59 | FH 24 west (Staircase Road) | Northern terminus, north end of FFH 24 overlap |
1.000 mi = 1.609 km; 1.000 km = 0.621 mi: Concurrency terminus
