= Washington State Route 117 =

State highway in Washington County, Washington, US

State Route 117
- Tumwater Truck Road; POW/MIA Memorial Highway
- SR 117 highlighted in red

Route information
- Auxiliary route of US 101
- Maintained by WSDOT
- Length: 1.40 mi (2.25 km)
- Existed: 1991–present

Major junctions
- South end: US 101 in Port Angeles
- North end: Marine Drive in Port Angeles

Location
- Country: United States
- State: Washington

Highway system
- State highways in Washington; Interstate; US; State; Scenic; Pre-1964; 1964 renumbering; Former
← SR 116	→ SR 119

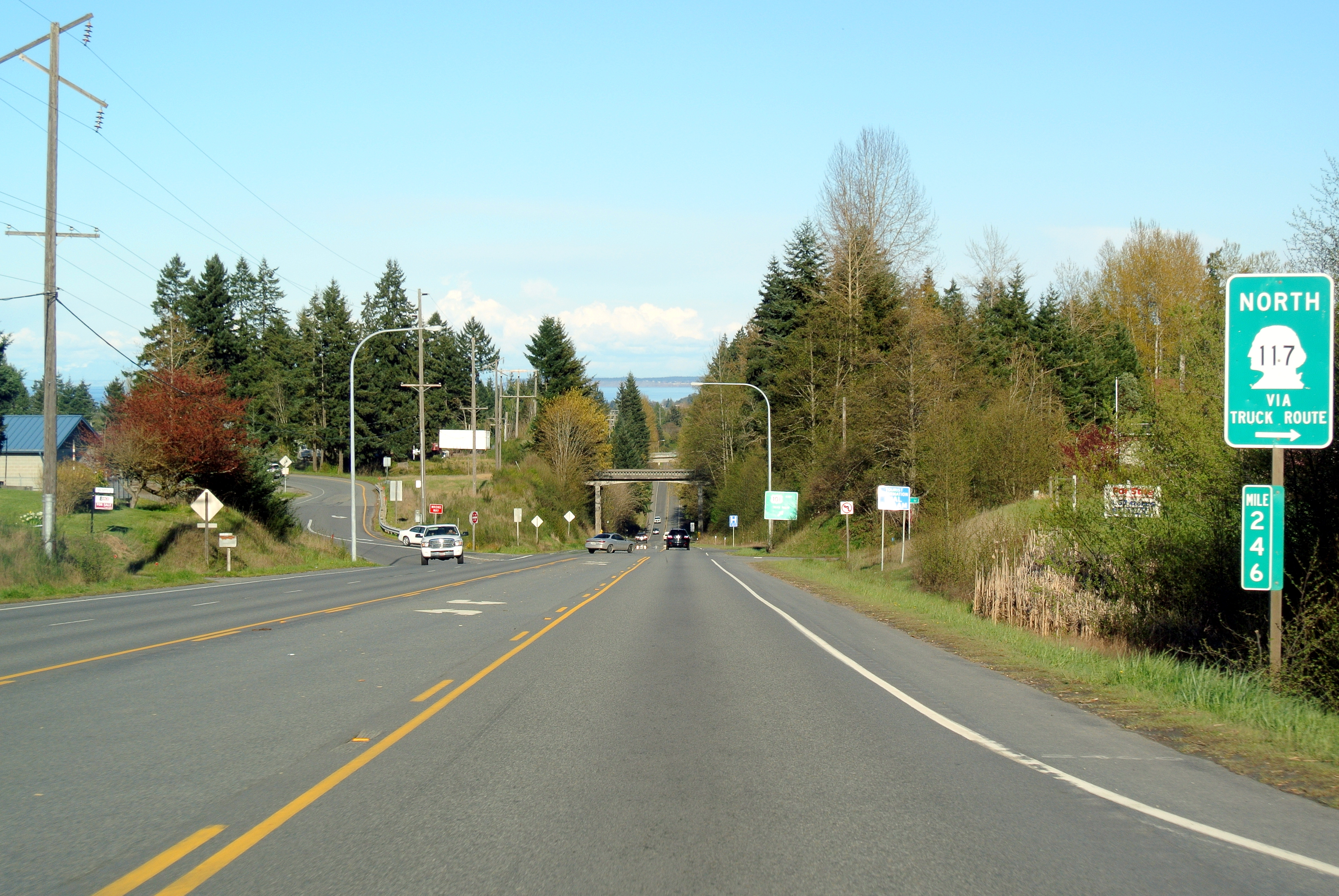
Interchange seen from US Route 101

State Route 117 (SR 117) is a short, 1.40-mile (2.25 km) long state highway located entirely within Port Angeles, the county seat of Clallam County, in the U.S. state of Washington. The short roadway, named the Tumwater Truck Route, serves the waterfront of Port Angeles and intersects two streets and crosses under another street on a short bridge. Beginning at an interchange with U.S. Route 101 (US 101), the highway travels northeast to terminate at Marine Drive. SR 117 was first established in 1991, but a road parallel to the current roadway had existed since 1966.

== Route description ==
SR 117 begins as the Tumwater Truck Road at an interchange with U.S. Route 101 (US 101) in southwest Port Angeles. The interchange only serves traffic from US 101 eastbound driving onto SR 117 northbound and motorists driving from the route southbound onto US 101 westbound, however, left turns are allowed to serve the missing movements. Traveling north, the highway intersects Lauridsen Boulevard and crosses under 8th Street. Between 8th Street and the Port Angeles waterfront, a daily average of 7,400 motorists accessed the roadway in 2008. After the 8th Street bridge, the road intersects 3rd Street and terminates at Marine Drive, which continues east as 1st Street to US 101.

== History ==
SR 117 was designated in 1991, but a short local street connecting the waterfront with U.S. Route 101 (US 101) had existed for several decades under local maintenance. The Tumwater Truck Road was approved for construction by the Port Angeles city government in 1954 to detour logging truck traffic away from residential neighborhoods. It was constructed at a cost of $250,000, shared with the county and state governments, along the existing Tumwater Canyon. The unfinished road was opened to traffic in July 1956, with logging truck drivers encouraged to use the graded road to prepare it for paving. In 1991, the state government added the truck road to the state highway system, assigning SR 117 as its designation.

During a severe winter storm on November 27, 2006, the Port Angeles Police Department closed both ends of the highway due to treacherous conditions. On December 15, 2006, a wind storm caused trees near the roadway to block the highway and the route had to be shut down. On August 7, 2007, the city of Port Angeles announced that the 8th Street bridge over the Tumwater Truck Route would be closed on August 20, 2007. A detour was set for both 8th Street and the truck route; trucks were routed onto US 101 (Lincoln Street) and Marine Drive / Front Street. Starting on April 1, 2008, the new bridge's girders started to arrive at the construction site. The last girders arrived on April 9 and the highway was reopened. On August 1, the roadway was closed for another month to be reconstructed. SR 117 was designated as the POW/MIA Memorial Highway by the state transportation commission in 2013.

== Major intersections ==
The entire highway is in Port Angeles, Clallam County.

mi	km	Destinations	Notes
0.00	0.00	US 101 (Olympic Highway) – Aberdeen, Forks, Olympia	Southern terminus; westbound entrance and eastbound exit
1.40	2.25	Marine Drive	Northern terminus
1.000 mi = 1.609 km; 1.000 km = 0.621 mi
