= Belfair, Washington =

Belfair
- Census-designated place (CDP)
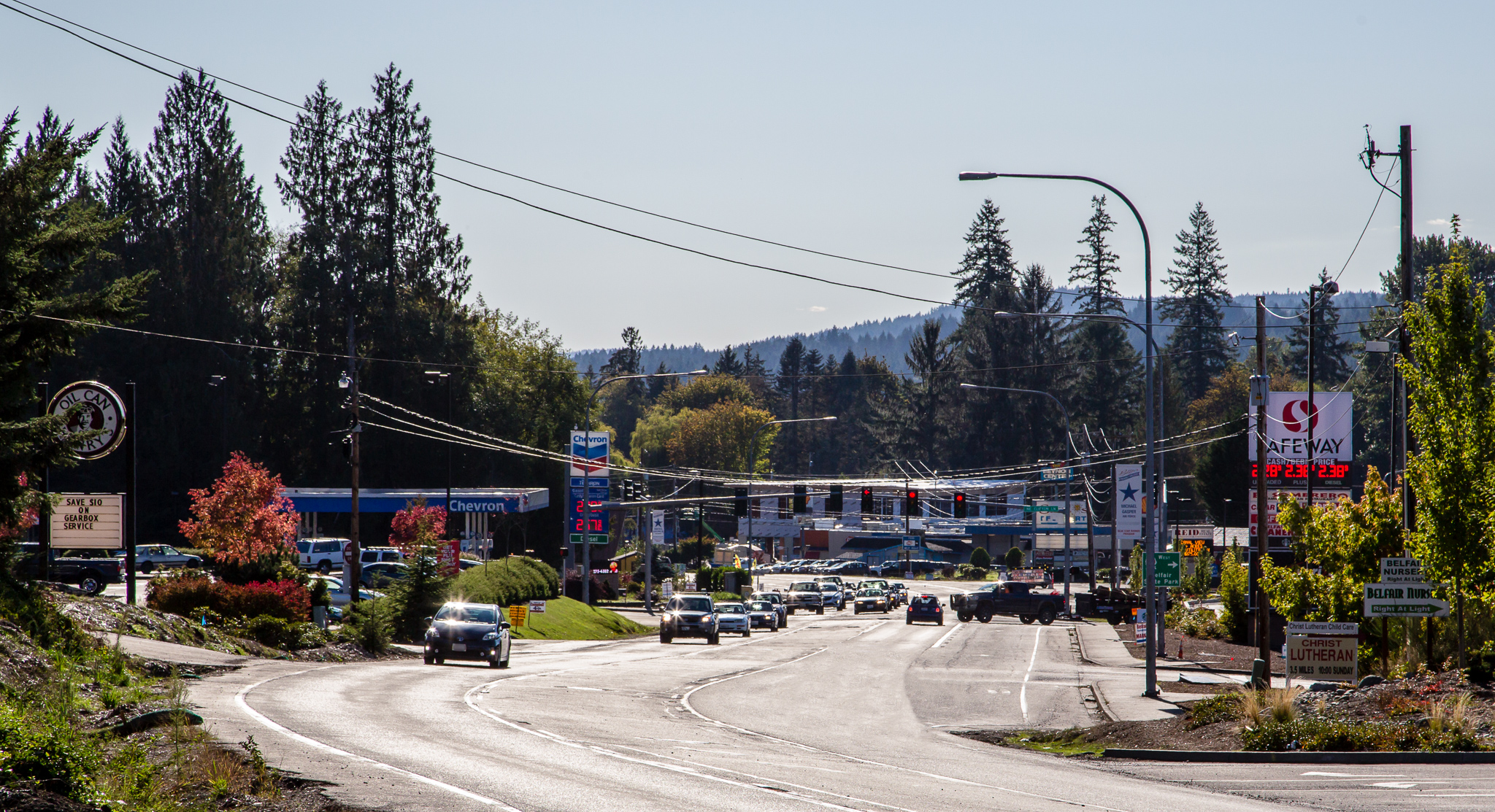
- State Route 3 through Belfair

- Location of Belfair, in Washington State
- Coordinates: 47°26′42″N 122°51′53″W
- Country: United States
- State: Washington
- County: Mason

Area
  - Total: 44.9 sq mi (116 km^{2})
- Elevation: 36 ft (11 m)

Population (2020)
  - Total: 4,279
  - Density: 95.3/sq mi (36.8/km^{2})
- Time zone: Pacific (PST) (UTC-8)
- ZIP Code: 98528
- Area code(s): 360, 564
- GNIS feature ID: 2586728

Belfair is a census-designated place in Mason County, Washington, United States. Located at the mouth of the Union River at Hood Canal, it serves as the commercial center of northern Mason County. The population of the surrounding area grows in the summertime, as the Canal and the Olympic Peninsula are popular with tourists. The population is currently estimated at 5,711 as of 2025.

== History ==
Belfair was originally referred to as Clifton, as were several other towns in the state. To avoid confusion, it was renamed in 1925 by Mrs. Murray, then postmaster, who submitted the name Belfair from a book that she was then reading.

== Geography ==
Belfair is located on an isthmus connecting the Kitsap and Olympic Peninsula. It receives an average rainfall of 60 inches (1,500 mm) yearly and has a growing season of 212 days with final spring frost around April 20 usually.

Mason Lake is 8 miles (13 km) southwest of Belfair.

== Demographics ==
Historical population
Census	Pop.	Note	%±
2010	3,931		—
2020	4,279		8.9%
U.S. Decennial Census; 2000 2010

Belfair first appeared as a census designated place in the 2010 U.S. census.

=== Racial and ethnic composition ===
Belfair CDP, Washington – Racial and ethnic composition Note: the US Census treats Hispanic/Latino as an ethnic category. This table excludes Latinos from the racial categories and assigns them to a separate category. Hispanics/Latinos may be of any race.
Race / Ethnicity (NH = Non-Hispanic)	Pop 2010	Pop 2020	% 2010	% 2020
White alone (NH)	3,228	3,008	82.12%	70.30%
Black or African American alone (NH)	23	56	0.59%	1.31%
Native American or Alaska Native alone (NH)	56	48	1.42%	1.12%
Asian alone (NH)	60	56	1.53%	1.31%
Native Hawaiian or Pacific Islander alone (NH)	13	22	0.33%	0.51%
Other race alone (NH)	2	19	0.05%	0.44%
Mixed race or Multiracial (NH)	147	349	3.74%	8.16%
Hispanic or Latino (any race)	402	721	10.23%	16.85%
Total	3,931	4,279	100.00%	100.00%

== Parks and recreation ==
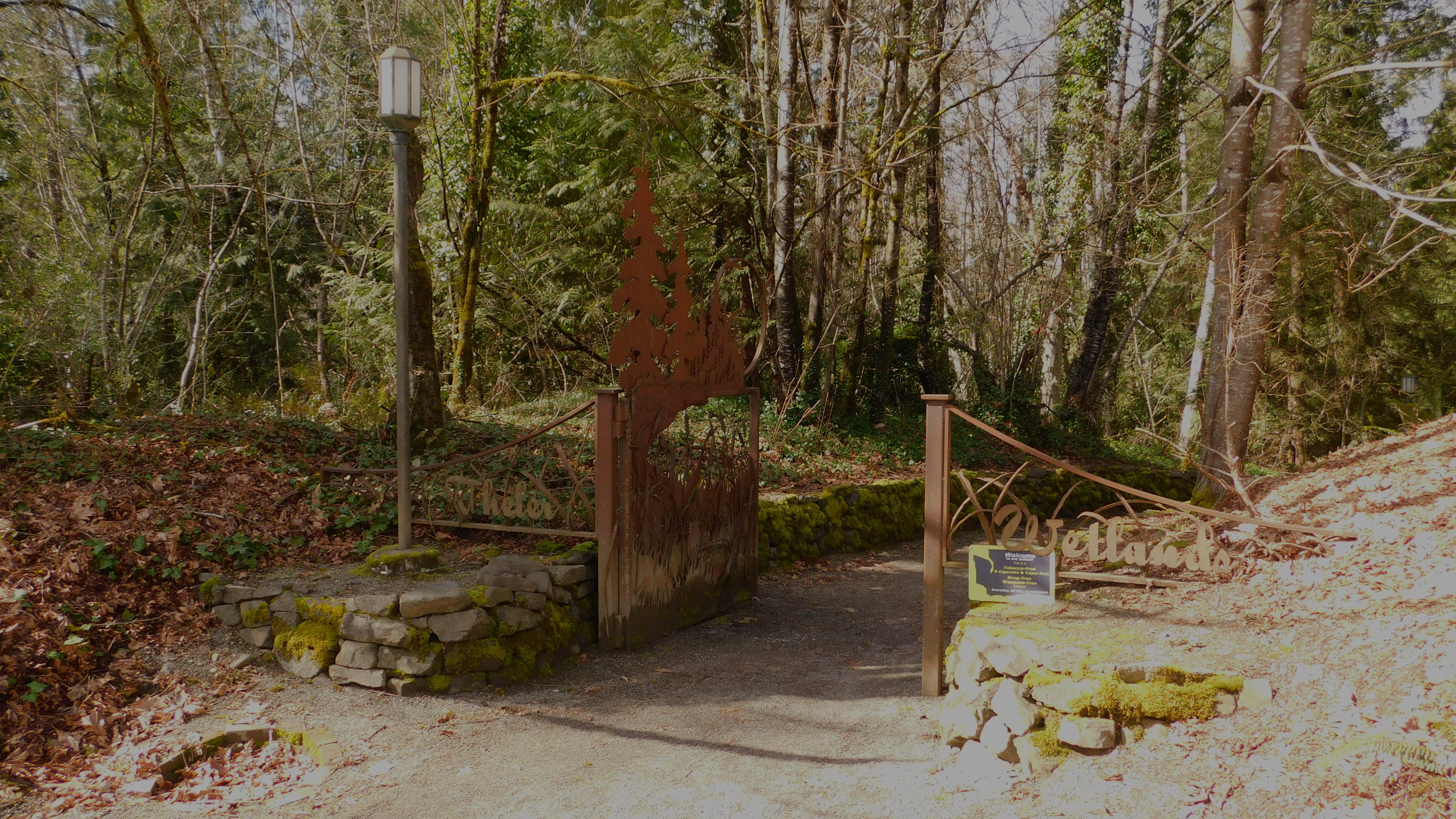
Theler Wetlands trailhead, 2025

Belfair serves as a gateway town for the Hood Canal region, and is the last town with services before visitors reach Tahuya State Forest.

The Theler Wetlands have walking trails meandering through 135 acres (0.55 km^{2}) of tidal wetlands, offering boardwalks and well-groomed paths with views of Hood Canal, Union River, and a tidal estuary. Other nature trails can be found near Belfair Elementary.

== Arts and culture ==
Belfair is home to "The Taste of Hood Canal", an annual event falling on the second Saturday in August. This festival, which is sponsored by the North Mason Rotary Club, features local artists, foods, and a classic car show.

Belfair is also home to the Mary E. Theler Community Center.

== Infrastructure ==
=== Health care ===
Belfair is the regional service hub for northern Mason County. Harrison Hospital operates an urgent care facility in Belfair, and local doctor offices are in the area along with other professional services. The area has local and chain restaurants, along with three major grocery stores (safeway, QFC, and grocery outlet). Local shopping includes gift stores. Timberland Regional Library has a local branch in Belfair. Several public golf courses are nearby, including McCormick Woods, Gold Mountain, Alderbrook, Trophy Lake, Horseshoe Lake, and Lakeland Village.

=== Roads ===
Washington State Route 3 is the main road leading into Belfair, from Bremerton and Gorst in the north, and Allyn in the south. Washington State Route 106 also starts at the south end of Belfair, leading toward Union, the next town along the south shore of Hood Canal. Washington State Route 300 begins in Belfair and runs along the north shore of Hood Canal, providing access to Tahuya and Dewatto Bay.

== Education ==
Belfair has two high schools (North Mason High School and James A. Taylor High School, an alternative school), a middle school (Hawkins Middle School), two elementary schools (Sand Hill Elementary and Belfair Elementary), and a co-op preschool.

== Notable people ==
- Noah Ashenhurst, former English teacher at North Mason High School and award-winning author of the novel Comfort Food
- Norm Dicks, politician and former member of the United States House of Representatives
