= Washington State Route 100 =

State highway in Pacific County, Washington, US

State Route 100
- SR 100 highlighted in red

Route information
- Auxiliary route of US 101
- Maintained by WSDOT
- Length: 4.68 mi (7.53 km)
- Existed: 1991–present
- Tourist routes: Lewis and Clark Trail

Major junctions
- CCW end: US 101 in Ilwaco
- CW end: SR 100 in Ilwaco

Location
- Country: United States
- State: Washington
- County: Pacific

Highway system
- State highways in Washington; Interstate; US; State; Scenic; Pre-1964; 1964 renumbering; Former
← SR 99	→ US 101

State Route 100 (SR 100) is a 4.68-mile-long (7.53 km) state highway in the U.S. state of Washington, serving Cape Disappointment State Park in Pacific County. The highway travels counterclockwise from U.S. Route 101 (US 101) in Ilwaco south to Cape Disappointment and north to an intersection with itself in Ilwaco. SR 100, part of the Lewis and Clark Trail Scenic Byway, serves as a loop route and has a spur route that serves the state park and a Coast Guard station. SR 100 was established in 1991 on the existing North Head Road, which was a paved county road by the late 1950s. The highway was washed away during a 1994 winter storm and had its spur route shortened in 2006.

== Route description ==
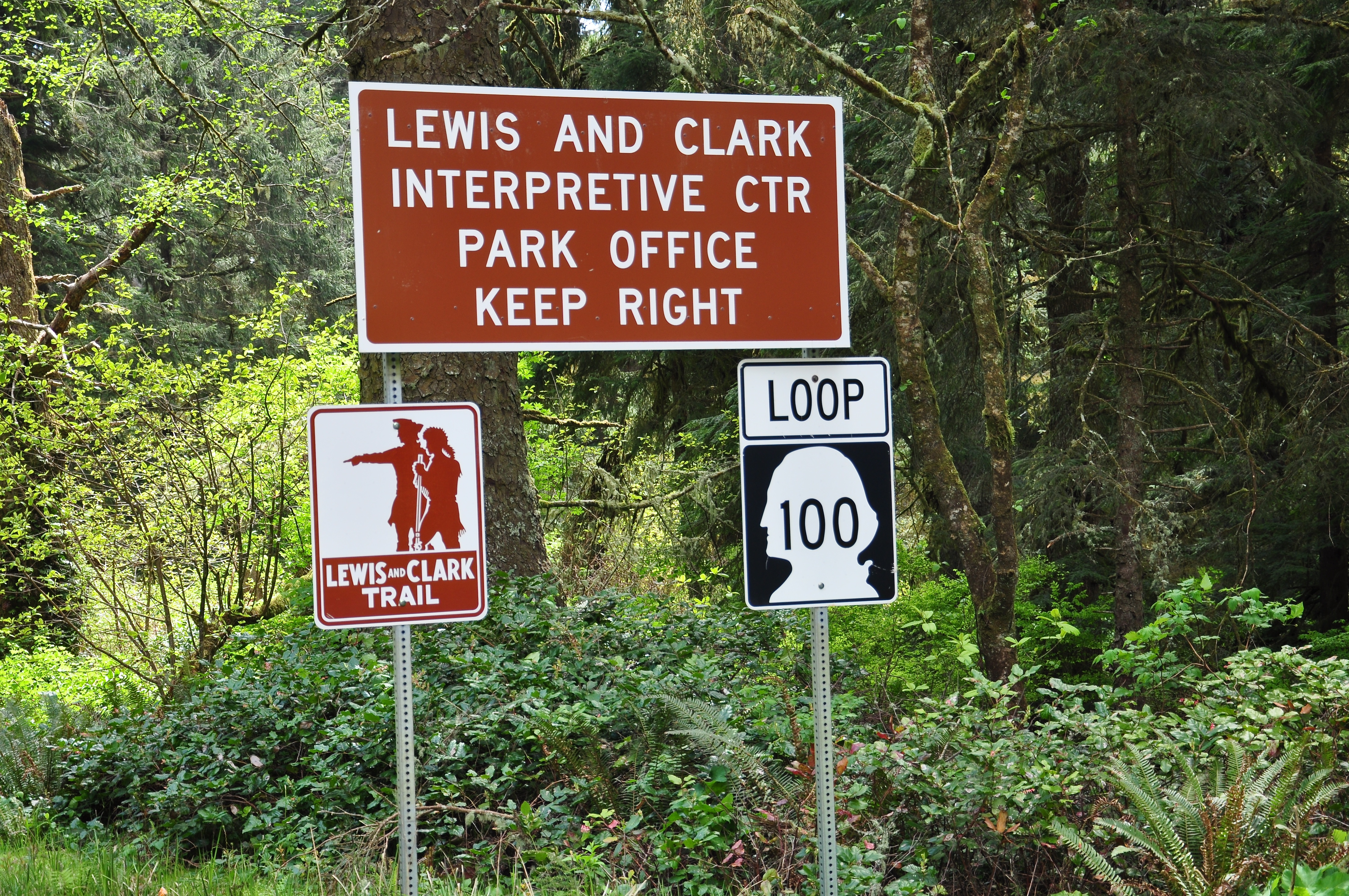
Signage along SR 100 within Cape Disappointment State Park

SR 100 begins at an intersection with US 101 in Ilwaco as the highway turns north onto 1st Avenue towards Seaview. The highway, part of the Lewis and Clark Trail Scenic Byway, travels west on Spruce Street through an intersection with the clockwise terminus of SR 100, on 2nd Avenue, and continues towards the Pacific Ocean on North Head Road. SR 100 turns south along the Pacific coast past North Head Lighthouse and into Cape Disappointment State Park on Robert Gray Drive. The highway intersects its spur route that travels south on Fort Canby Road towards Coast Guard Station Cape Disappointment. SR 100 turns north and travels into Ilawaco along Baker Bay and the Columbia River before it ends at an intersection with SR 100 a block from its terminus at US 101.

Every year, the Washington State Department of Transportation (WSDOT) conducts a series of surveys on its highways in the state to measure traffic volume. This is expressed in terms of annual average daily traffic (AADT), which is a measure of traffic volume for any average day of the year. In 2011, WSDOT calculated that the busiest section of SR 100 was its terminus at US 101 in Illwaco, serving 2,100 vehicles, while the least busiest section was the intersection with its spur route in Cape Disappointment State Park, serving 650 vehicles.

== History ==
The North Head Road portion of SR 100, traveling west from Ilwaco to the Pacific coast and south to Cape Disappointment within Fort Canby State Park, has existed as a paved roadway since 1957. SR 100 was established in 1991 by the Washington State Legislature and was made into a complete loop route around the cape, with a short spur route traveling south into Fort Canby State Park, later renamed to Cape Disappointment State Park. The state government took over maintenance of the highway on April 1, 1992. Robert Gray Way was rebuilt after a 1994 winter storm washed away the roadway into Baker Bay.

== Spur route ==
State Route 100 Spur
- Location: Cape Disappointment State Park
- Length: 0.08 mi (130 m)
- Existed: 1991–present

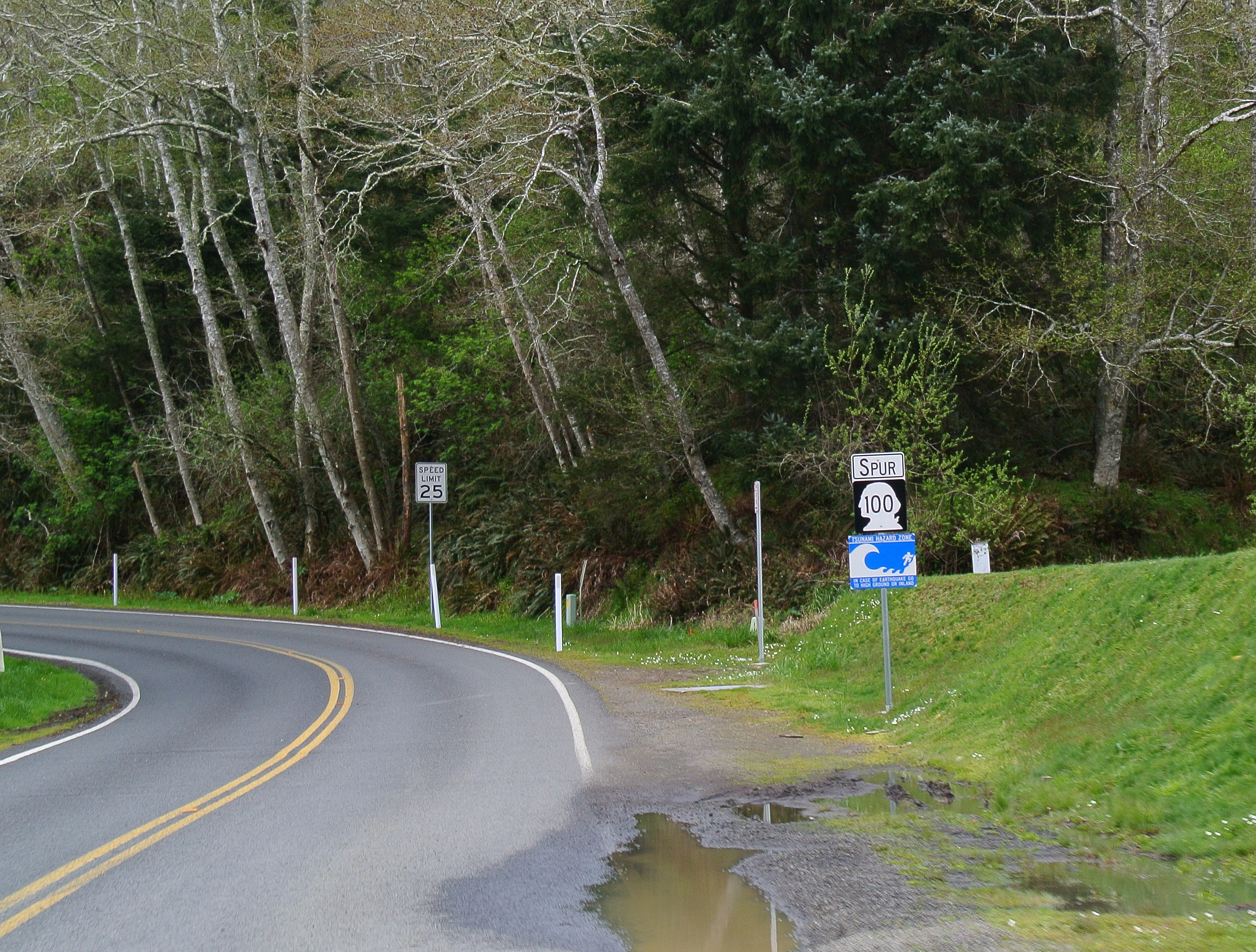
Spur route of the SR 100

SR 100 has a 0.08-mile-long (0.13 km) spur route that travels south from the SR 100 mainline to the boundary of Cape Disappointment State Park. The spur route was established in 1991 along with the main route and was originally 0.61 miles (0.98 km) long until part of the highway was transferred to Pacific County on January 3, 2006.

== Major intersections ==
The entire highway is in Pacific County.

Location	mi	km	Destinations	Notes
Ilwaco	0.00	0.00	US 101 (1st Avenue) – Long Beach, Astoria	Counterclockwise terminus
Ilwaco	0.06	0.097	SR 100 loop (2nd Avenue SW) – Cape Disappointment State Park	Clockwise terminus of SR 100
Cape Disappointment State Park	2.95	4.75	SR 100 Spur south (Fort Canby Road) – Lewis and Clark Interpretive Center	
Ilwaco	4.68	7.53	SR 100 loop (Spruce Street)	Clockwise terminus
1.000 mi = 1.609 km; 1.000 km = 0.621 mi
