= Washington State Route 107 =

State highway in Grays Harbor County, Washington, US

State Route 107
- SR 107 highlighted in red

Route information
- Auxiliary route of US 101
- Maintained by WSDOT
- Length: 7.93 mi (12.76 km)
- Existed: 1964–present

Major junctions
- South end: US 101 near Cosmopolis
- North end: US 12 in Montesano

Location
- Country: United States
- State: Washington
- Counties: Grays Harbor

Highway system
- State highways in Washington; Interstate; US; State; Scenic; Pre-1964; 1964 renumbering; Former
← SR 106	→ SR 108

State Route 107 (SR 107) is a 7.93-mile-long (12.76 km) state highway serving Grays Harbor County in the U.S. state of Washington. The highway travels northeast from U.S. Route 101 (US 101) south of Cosmopolis to an interchange with US 12 in Montesano. SR 107 was created during the 1964 highway renumbering as the successor to a branch of Primary State Highway 9 (PSH 9), established earlier in 1937.

== Route description ==
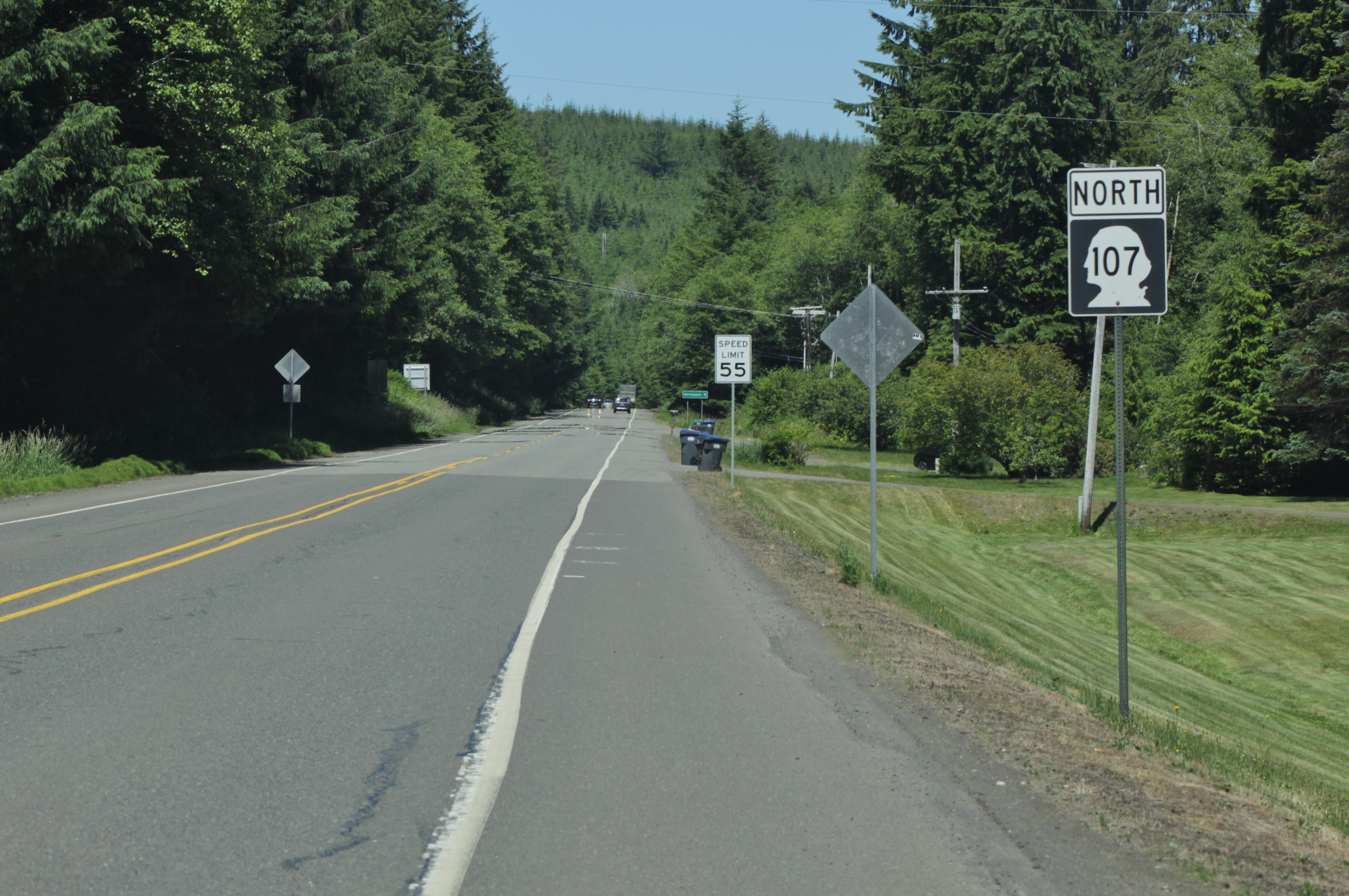
SR 107 northbound at its terminus with US 101

SR 107 begins at an intersection with US 101 in rural Grays Harbor County between Cosmopolis and Raymond. The highway travels north along the Little North River and east along the Chehalis River through the communities of Preachers Slough and Melbourne. SR 107 turns north in South Montesano and crosses the Chehalis River into the city of Montesano before the designation ends at a diamond interchange with US 12, while the roadway continues north as Main Street into the city.

Every year, the Washington State Department of Transportation (WSDOT) conducts a series of surveys on its highways in the state to measure traffic volume. This is expressed in terms of annual average daily traffic (AADT), which is a measure of traffic volume for any average day of the year. In 2011, WSDOT calculated that between 2,300 and 5,800 vehicles per day used the highway, mostly in the Montesano area.

== History ==
PSH 9 was created with the primary and secondary state highways in 1937, including a 8.28-mile-long (13.33 km) branch that connects the main highway and US 410 in Montesano to US 101 and PSH 14 near Artic. The current truss bridge over the Chehalis River between South Montesano and Montesano was built in 1958 alongside two other bridges in the area by the Department of Highways. SR 107 was established during the 1964 highway renumbering to replace the PSH 9 branch and was codified in 1970. The new highway was truncated to its current terminus, a diamond interchange with US 12, after Montesano was bypassed by US 12 in 1967. The highway is closed occasionally by seasonal flooding, most recently in 1994 and 2008.

The 731-foot (223 m) Chehalis River bridge was rehabilitated by the state government from 2019 to 2021 at a cost of $25.2 million, funded by the Connecting Washington package passed in 2015. The project included repainting the bridge's steel truss to prevent corrosion, replacing the bridge deck, and replacing the wooden trestle on the south approach with concrete and steel pilings.

== Major intersections ==
The entire highway is in Grays Harbor County.

Location	mi	km	Destinations	Notes
	0.00	0.00	US 101 – Raymond, Aberdeen, Astoria	Southern terminus
Montesano	7.87– 7.93	12.67– 12.76	US 12 – Aberdeen, Elma, Olympia	Northern terminus, interchange
1.000 mi = 1.609 km; 1.000 km = 0.621 mi
