= Washington State Route 106 =

State highway in Mason County, Washington, US

State Route 106
- SR 106 highlighted in red

Route information
- Auxiliary route of US 101
- Maintained by WSDOT
- Length: 20.09 mi (32.33 km)
- Existed: 1964–present

Major junctions
- West end: US 101 in Skokomish
- East end: SR 3 near Belfair

Location
- Country: United States
- State: Washington
- Counties: Mason

Highway system
- State highways in Washington; Interstate; US; State; Scenic; Pre-1964; 1964 renumbering; Former
← SR 105	→ SR 107

State Route 106 (SR 106) is a Washington state highway in Mason County, extending 20.09 miles (32.33 km) from U.S. Route 101 (US 101) in Skokomish to SR 3 south of Belfair. The road was once a section of State Road 21 in 1915, which later became State Road 14 in 1923 and Primary State Highway 14 (PSH 14) in 1937 and PSH 21 in 1955. PSH 21 became SR 106 in 1964 and since, the Washington State Department of Transportation has arranged and completed minor projects to improve the roadway.

== Route description ==
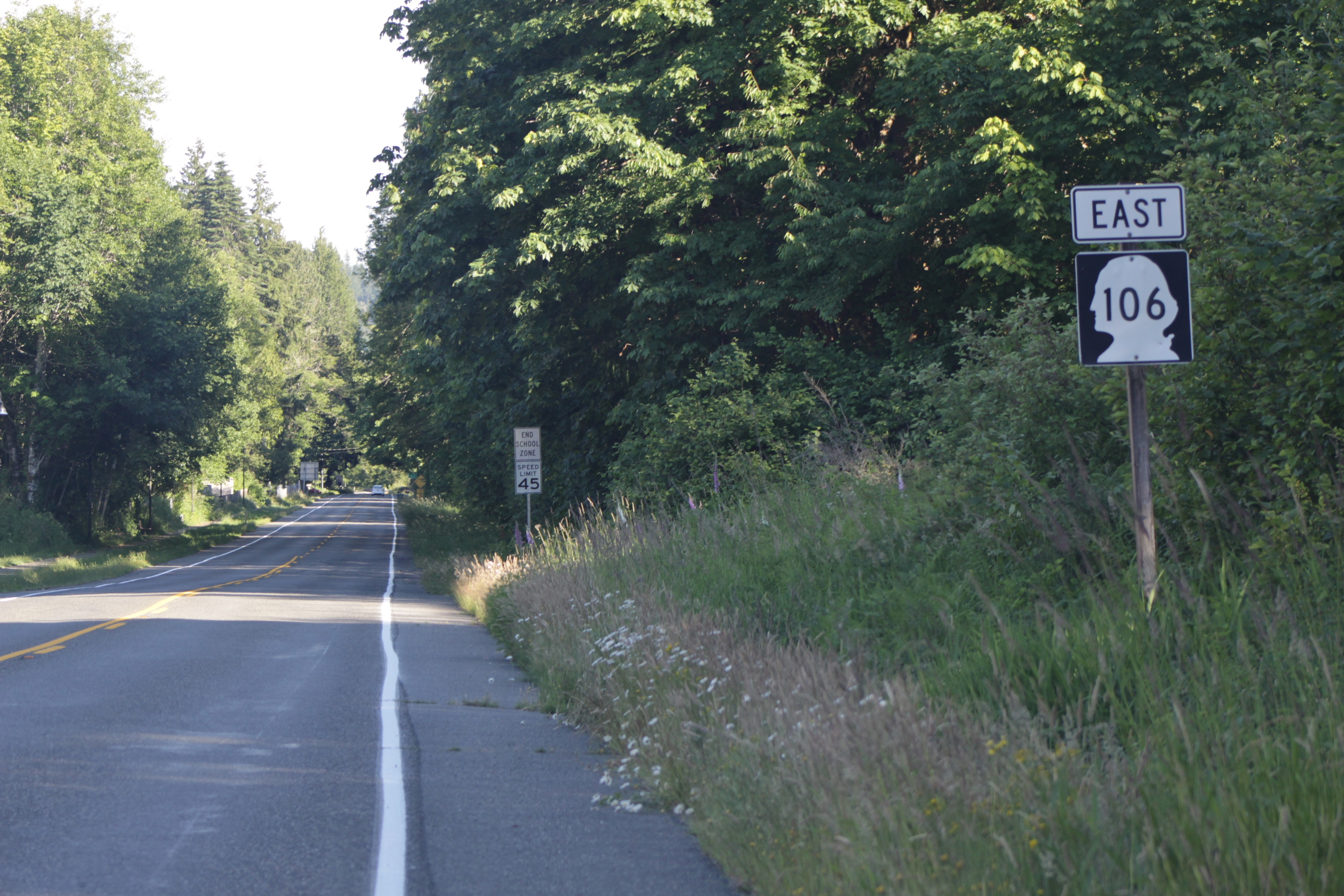
SR 106 eastbound in Skokomish

State Route 106 (SR 106) begins at a 3-way junction with U.S. Route 101 (US 101) in the census-designated place (CDP) of Skokomish, located north of Shelton. From the intersection, the road travels southeast to bridge Skobob Creek and curve north along the Skokomish River and Annas Bay to the community of Union. After passing Union, the highway continues along the southern shoreline of Hood Canal past Twanoh State Park to intersect SR 3 south of Belfair. The roadway approaching the SR 3 intersection near Belfair was used by 6,100 motorists daily in 2007 based on annual average daily traffic (AADT) data collected by the Washington State Department of Transportation; AADT data from 1970 shows that 2,000 motorists used the same section of SR 106 daily.

== History ==
Before SR 106 was established in 1964, two older highways, PSH 14 (1937–1955, left) and PSH 21 (1955–1964, right) used the current route of the highway.

The first state-maintained highway on the current route of SR 106 was State Road 21, established in 1915 by the Washington State Legislature and Department of Highways and ran from Skokomish to Kingston. State Road 21 later became State Road 14, named the Navy Yard Highway, in a 1923 renumbering. During the creation of the Primary and secondary highways, State Road 14 became Primary State Highway 14 (PSH 14) in 1937. The Skokomish–Gorst section of PSH 14 was later added to PSH 21 in 1955. The 1964 highway renumbering divided PSH 21 into SR 106, SR 3 and SR 104.

Recently, the Washington State Department of Transportation (WSDOT) has arranged and completed some minor construction projects along the SR 106 corridor. The first project replaced a culvert over Skobob Creek with a bridge; the project was completed in December 2005 and was located 0.85 miles (1.37 km) east of Skokomish. In 2007, WSDOT installed a traffic signal at the SR 106 / SR 3 intersection south of Belfair.

== Major intersections ==
The entire route is in Mason County.

Location	mi	km	Destinations	Notes
Skokomish	0.000	0.000	US 101 – Olympia, Port Angeles, Aberdeen	
	20.09	32.33	SR 3 – Belfair, Shelton, Bremerton	
1.000 mi = 1.609 km; 1.000 km = 0.621 mi
