= Union, Washington =

- CDP
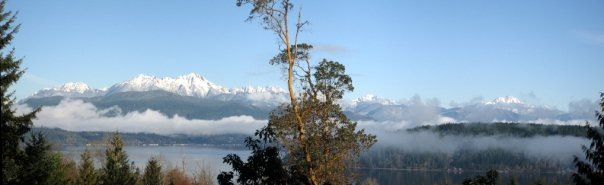
- Scenery around Union

- Location within Washington (state)
- Coordinates: 47°20′51″N 123°05′42″W
- Country: United States
- State: Washington
- County: Mason
- Elevation: 358 ft (109 m)

Population (2020)
  - Total: 683
- Time zone: UTC-8 (Pacific (PST))
  - Summer (DST): UTC-7 (PDT)
- ZIP Code: 98592
- Area code(s): 360, 564
- GNIS feature ID: 2586749

Union or Union City is a small census-designated place in Mason County, Washington, United States. The community lies along the southern shore of the Great Bend of the Hood Canal, near the mouth of the Skokomish River, which flows from the nearby Olympic Mountains. As of the 2020 census, Union had a population of 683. The ZIP Code for Union is 98592.

State Route 106 is the main route through Union, leading to Belfair farther north, and Potlatch and US Highway 101 to the south.

== History ==
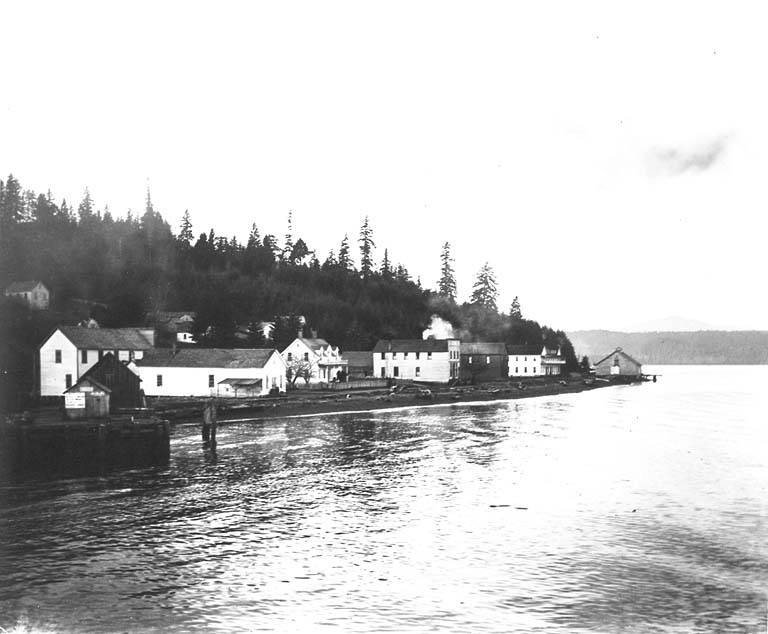
Union circa 1905

The Hood Canal basin is the indigenous territory of several neighboring Native American communities, including the Skokomish and Squaxin peoples.

In the 1830s, white fur traders built a blockhouse on the bluff where Union is today. Settlers arrived in the area in the 1840s, with the future Union City site being claimed in 1852 by Thomas Webb or Wells. The town of Union was founded and named in 1858 by merchants Willson and Anderson.

In 1889, logging pioneer John McReavy platted Union City on Hood Canal's south shore. The area's logging operations worked at an unprecedented scale to supply the expansionist ethos of Manifest Destiny. Dozens of mills sent timber to the booming California goldfields and for the construction of the Panama Canal. The generation that followed McReavy's drew inspiration from the surrounding landscape. Union society circulated around Olympus Manor, an artist colony that prospered until 1952 when the manor burned. It was the first non-native artist colony in Washington.

Union City was envisioned as the western terminus of a transcontinental railroad but the project was abandoned by the Union Pacific Railroad after the Panic of 1893.

== Climate ==
This region experiences warm (but not hot) and dry summers, with no average monthly temperatures above 71.6 °F. According to the Köppen Climate Classification system, Union has a warm-summer Mediterranean climate, abbreviated "Csb" on climate maps.

== Demographics ==
Historical population
| Census | Pop. | Note | %± |
|---|---|---|---|
| 2010 | 631 | | — |
| 2020 | 683 | | 8.2% |
U.S. Decennial Census; 2000 2010

Union first appeared as a census designated place in the 2010 U.S. census.

=== Racial and ethnic composition ===
Union CDP, Washington – Racial and ethnic composition Note: the US Census treats Hispanic/Latino as an ethnic category. This table excludes Latinos from the racial categories and assigns them to a separate category. Hispanics/Latinos may be of any race.
| Race / Ethnicity (NH = Non-Hispanic) | Pop 2010 | Pop 2020 | % 2010 | % 2020 |
|---|---|---|---|---|
| White alone (NH) | 554 | 589 | 87.80% | 86.24% |
| Black or African American alone (NH) | 2 | 0 | 0.32% | 0.00% |
| Native American or Alaska Native alone (NH) | 19 | 9 | 3.01% | 1.32% |
| Asian alone (NH) | 8 | 8 | 1.27% | 1.17% |
| Native Hawaiian or Pacific Islander alone (NH) | 0 | 0 | 0.00% | 0.00% |
| Other race alone (NH) | 3 | 9 | 0.48% | 1.32% |
| Mixed race or Multiracial (NH) | 29 | 28 | 4.60% | 4.10% |
| Hispanic or Latino (any race) | 16 | 40 | 2.54% | 5.86% |
| Total | 631 | 683 | 100.00% | 100.00% |

== Arts and culture ==
Local attractions include a working farm and roadside market, a golf course, marinas and public boat launch sites, and the deep saltwater fjord of Hood Canal. Visitors come to the area for activities including boating, fishing, hunting, shellfishing, sea kayaking and birding.

In 2010, Union was named one of America's twenty prettiest towns by Forbes Traveler.

== Parks and recreation ==
In 1938, President Franklin D. Roosevelt designated the nearby wilderness of the Olympic Mountains a national park. The area is now an International Biosphere Reserve and a World Heritage Site. The mountains in the southeast corner of the park, Mount Washington, Mount Constance and the Brothers, rise across Hood Canal and can be seen from almost any point in Union.
