= Angelo Pellegrini =

American writer and professor (1904–1991)

Angelo Pellegrini (1904–1991) was an American writer and professor of English Literature at the University of Washington. His books are about the pleasures of growing and making your own food and wine, and about the Italian immigrant experience.

Pellegrini's family immigrated in 1913 from Tuscany to McCleary, Washington, where his father worked for a sawmill. His first book was titled Argumentation and Public Discussion, written in 1936 with Brents Stirling. In 1948, he wrote The Unprejudiced Palate, an important work in the history of food literature that remains in print.

In 1946, Sunset published Pellegrini's recipe for pesto, likely the first major publication of a pesto recipe in the United States; but pesto only became widely known until 1980s.

== Books ==
- Argumentation and Public Discussion (1936, with Brents Sterling)
- The Unprejudiced Palate (1948)
- Immigrant's Return (1951)
- Americans By Choice (1956)
- Wine and the Good Life (1965)
- Washington: Profile of a State (1967)
- The Food Lover's Garden (1970)
- Lean Years, Happy Years (1983)
- American Dream: An Immigrant's Quest (1986)
- Vintage Pellegrini: the collected wisdom of an American Buongustaio (1990)
