= Comfort Food (novel) =

2005 novel by Noah Ashenhurst

- First edition cover
- Author: Noah Ashenhurst
- Language: English
- Genre: Novel
- Publisher: Old Meadow Publishers
- Publication date: 25 November 2005
- Publication place: United States
- Media type: Print (paperback)
- Pages: 255 pp (first edition, paperback)
- ISBN: 0-9769735-0-2 (First edition, paperback)
- OCLC: 62522380

Comfort Food: A Novel by Noah Ashenhurst contains a cast of characters: a romantic academic, a self-assured young writer, an enigmatic musician, a slacker, a wealthy mountaineer, and a former heroin addict—characters whose lives intersect in the unique, award-winning debut novel. It was first published in November 2005.

== Plot introduction ==
Stan Gillman-Reinhart is a graduate student at a small university in Bellingham, Washington in 1993. Through his experiences and frustrations we meet Delany Richardson, a budding writer and old friend of Stan's; John Snyder, a local musician; Brian Fetzler, Stan's stoner roommate; Dave Greibing, a mountaineer and Delany's ex-boyfriend; and Bridgette Jonsen, a former heroin addict and Dave's current girlfriend.

Successive sections of the novel focus on John's earlier trip through Eastern Europe, Delany's previous summer in Alaska, Brian's life after college, Bridgette's earlier road trip through Utah, Dave's ascent of Denali, and a tragic accident that illuminates their lives.

Set in the verdant Pacific Northwest, the sandstone deserts of Utah, the gritty streets of Budapest, and the snow-covered wasteland of Denali, Comfort Food is a literary work with an emphasis on the importance of human relationships and a sense of place.

== Major themes ==
The major themes include: The inescapability of death, the difficulties of growing up and asserting one's individuality, the interconnectedness and power of relationships, addictions as a means to deal with the discomforts of being human, the power and impact of decisions in a morally bankrupt society, and the influence of place (especially in the American West).

== Awards and nominations ==
Comfort Food: A Novel won the 2006 Independent Publisher Book Award for Best Regional Fiction (West-Pacific).
