= Hoodsport, Washington =

- CDP
- Location within Washington (state)
- Coordinates: 47°24′07″N 123°09′15″W
- Country: United States
- State: Washington
- County: Mason
- Elevation: 246 ft (75 m)

Population (2020)
  - Total: 419
- Time zone: UTC-8 (Pacific (PST))
  - Summer (DST): UTC-7 (PDT)
- ZIP Code: 98548
- Area code(s): 360, 564
- GNIS feature ID: 2586734

Hoodsport is a census-designated place (CDP) in Mason County, Washington, United States. The population was 419 at the 2020 census. Hoodsport is located along the Hood Canal, at the intersection of U.S. Route 101 and State Route 119. Lake Cushman is 5 miles (8.0 km) up the road on State Route 119. Hoodsport is the gateway to the Staircase area of the Olympic National Park.

== History ==
The first person to settle at Hoodsport was G.K. Robbins, a ship captain who had been transporting lumber along Hood Canal for years. Other settlers soon joined him, forming a small community. Most occupied themselves with farming or logging. The town was officially platted in 1890 by the Mason County Mine and Development Company, which owned manganese mines near Lake Cushman. Prospectors found evidence of copper in the area and over 400 mining claims were filed during the late 19th and early 20th centuries. Nearly all claims failed to yield.

== Geography ==
Hoodsport is renowned among SCUBA divers as a staging area to view the giant Pacific octopus. Local marine preserves such as Octopus Hole and Sund Rock offer divers the chance to see octopus, as well as wolf eels, rock fish, plumose anemones and other marine life.

=== Climate ===
This region experiences warm (but not hot) and dry summers, with no average monthly temperatures above 71.6 °F (22.0 °C). According to the Köppen Climate Classification system, Hoodsport has a warm-summer Mediterranean climate, abbreviated "Csb" on climate maps.

== Demographics ==
Historical population
Census	Pop.	Note	%±
2010	376		—
2020	419		11.4%
U.S. Decennial Census; 2000 2010

Hoodsport first appeared as a census designated place in the 2010 U.S. census.

=== Racial and ethnic composition ===
Hoodsport CDP, Washington – Racial and ethnic composition Note: the US Census treats Hispanic/Latino as an ethnic category. This table excludes Latinos from the racial categories and assigns them to a separate category. Hispanics/Latinos may be of any race.
Race / Ethnicity (NH = Non-Hispanic)	Pop 2010	Pop 2020	% 2010	% 2020
White alone (NH)	334	330	88.83%	78.76%
Black or African American alone (NH)	0	2	0.00%	0.48%
Native American or Alaska Native alone (NH)	9	23	2.39%	5.49%
Asian alone (NH)	3	9	0.80%	2.15%
Native Hawaiian or Pacific Islander alone (NH)	5	0	1.33%	0.00%
Other race alone (NH)	0	4	0.00%	0.95%
Mixed race or Multiracial (NH)	13	32	3.46%	7.64%
Hispanic or Latino (any race)	12	19	3.19%	4.53%
Total	376	419	100.00%	100.00%

== Economy ==
The Hoodsport Winery is located about one mile south of town. Other Hoodsport businesses include a grocery store with gas station and a hardware store, plus five restaurants, an espresso shop, three real estate offices, a dentist, a post office, a construction office, a beauty salon, a brewery, a distillery, a diving shop and several tourism-oriented gift shops. The Washington State Department of Fish and Wildlife operates a fish hatchery in town.

The Hoodsport branch of the Timberland Regional Library overlooks the town.

== Parks and recreation ==
A public beach and dock located in the community are overseen by the Port of Hoodsport.
