= Kamilche, Washington =

Unincorporated community in Washington, United States

- Village
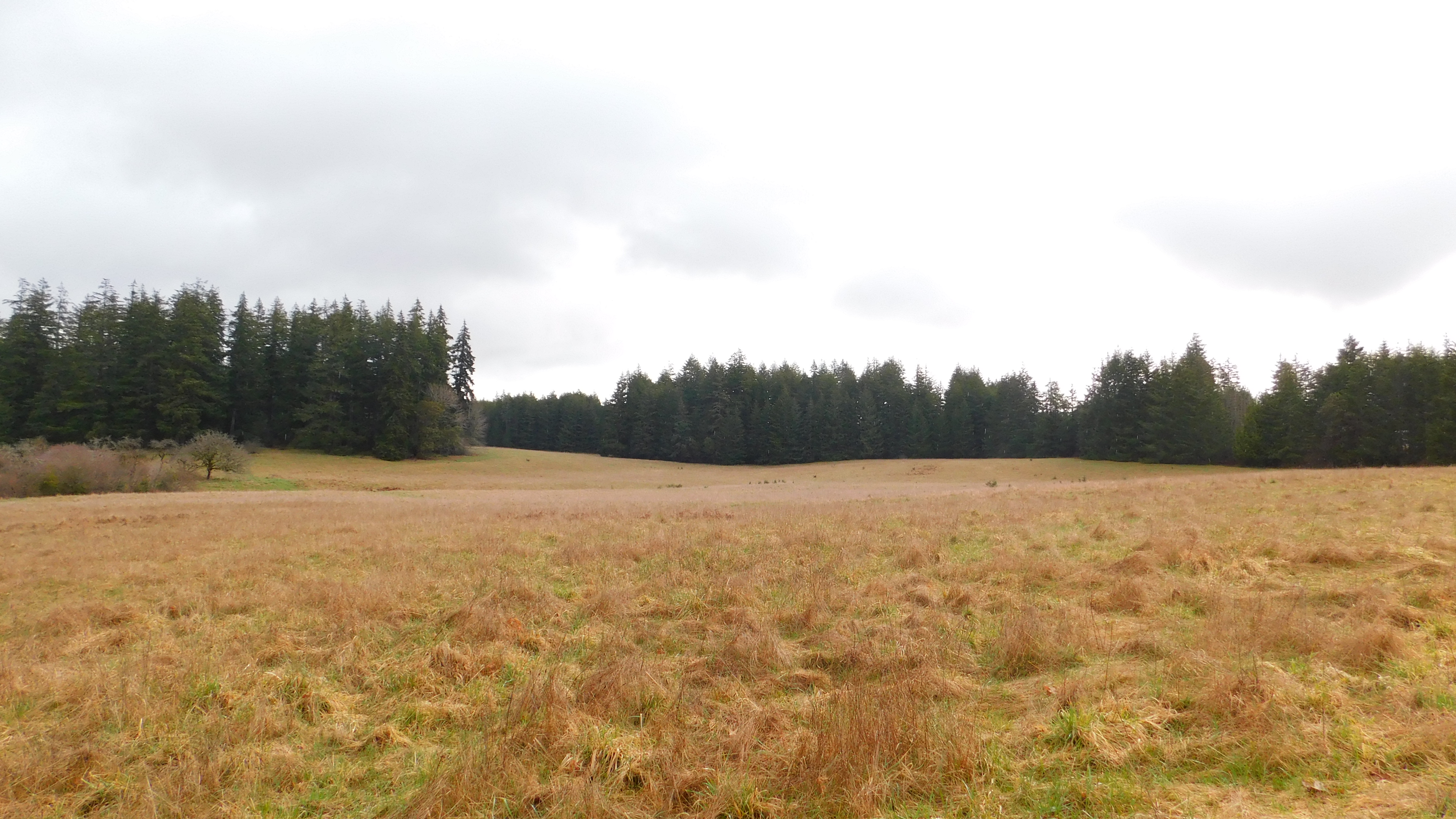
- Lake Isabella State Park, near Kamilche, 2025
- Interactive map of Kamilche, Washington
- Country: United States
- State: Washington
- County: Mason

Area
  - Total: 71.39 sq mi (184.89 km^{2})
  - Land: 68.5 sq mi (177.3 km^{2})
  - Water: 3.03 sq mi (7.86 km^{2})
- Elevation: 62 ft (19 m)
- Time zone: UTC-8 (Pacific (PST))
  - Summer (DST): UTC-7 (PDT)
- ZIP Code: 98584
- Area code(s): 360, 564
- GNIS feature ID: 1521556

Kamilche is a village in Mason County, Washington, United States. Primarily a farm area, Kamilche is also the home to the Squaxin Indian Tribe. It is at the crossroads of U.S. Route 101 and State Route 108. Kamilche sits at the edge of Little Skookum Inlet, a finger waterway off Puget Sound.
