= McCleary, Washington =

City in Washington, United States

- City
- Interactive map of McCleary, Washington
- Coordinates: 47°03′30″N 123°16′20″W
- Country: United States
- State: Washington
- County: Grays Harbor
- Founded: Late-1898
- Incorporated: January 6, 1943

Government
  - Type: Mayor–council

Area
  - Total: 2.07 sq mi (5.37 km^{2})
  - Land: 2.05 sq mi (5.31 km^{2})
  - Water: 0.023 sq mi (0.06 km^{2})
- Elevation: 272 ft (83 m)

Population (2020)
  - Total: 1,997
  - Estimate (2022): 2,040
  - Density: 861/sq mi (332.3/km^{2})
- Time zone: UTC-8 (Pacific (PST))
  - Summer (DST): UTC-7 (PDT)
- ZIP Code: 98557
- Area code(s): 360, 564
- FIPS code: 53-41225
- GNIS feature ID: 2411061
- Website: cityofmccleary.com

McCleary (/məkˈklæriː/) is a city in Grays Harbor County, Washington, United States. The population was 1,997 at the 2020 census.

== History ==
Henry McCleary came to the land in 1897, building two sawmills and a door manufacturing company. He sold the land and the companies to Simpson Logging Company, December 31, 1941. On January 9, 1943 the land became an incorporated city named after its founder. The Henry McCleary House, designed by Joseph Wohleb, still stands in Olympia, Washington and is listed on the National Register of Historic Places.

Since 1959, McCleary has held the annual Bear Festival with live performances and a parade. It originally began as a celebration of the spring bear hunt to control the local population, which endangered timber harvests, and included a serving of bear stew to the community.

== Geography ==
According to the United States Census Bureau, the city has a total area of 2.07 square miles (5.36 km^{2}), of which, 2.05 square miles (5.31 km^{2}) is land and 0.02 square miles (0.05 km^{2}) is water.

== Demographics ==
Historical population
Census	Pop.	Note	%±
1950	1,175		—
1960	1,115		−5.1%
1970	1,265		13.5%
1980	1,419		12.2%
1990	1,235		−13.0%
2000	1,454		17.7%
2010	1,653		13.7%
2020	1,997		20.8%
2022 (est.)	2,040		2.2%
U.S. Decennial Census; 2020 Census

=== 2020 census ===
As of the 2020 census, McCleary had a population of 1,997. The median age was 40.4 years. 20.1% of residents were under the age of 18, and 19.0% were 65 years of age or older. For every 100 females there were 88.2 males, and for every 100 females age 18 and over there were 84.8 males age 18 and over.

There were 770 households in McCleary, of which 30.9% had children under the age of 18 living in them. Of all households, 44.9% were married-couple households, 15.3% were households with a male householder and no spouse or partner present, and 29.6% were households with a female householder and no spouse or partner present. About 29.5% of all households were made up of individuals and 16.2% had someone living alone who was 65 years of age or older.

There were 823 housing units, of which 6.4% were vacant. The homeowner vacancy rate was 1.4% and the rental vacancy rate was 2.1%.

0.0% of residents lived in urban areas, while 100.0% lived in rural areas.

Racial composition as of the 2020 census
Race	Number	Percent
White	1,690	84.6%
Black or African American	12	0.6%
American Indian and Alaska Native	19	1.0%
Asian	30	1.5%
Native Hawaiian and Other Pacific Islander	11	0.6%
Some other race	43	2.2%
Two or more races	192	9.6%
Hispanic or Latino (of any race)	113	5.7%

=== 2010 census ===
As of the 2010 census, there were 1,653 people, 699 households, and 427 families living in the city. The population density was 806.3 inhabitants per square mile (311.3/km^{2}). There were 759 housing units at an average density of 370.2 per square mile (142.9/km^{2}). The racial makeup of the city was 93.5% White, 0.8% African American, 1.0% Native American, 0.7% Asian, 0.1% Pacific Islander, 0.4% from other races, and 3.4% from two or more races. Hispanic or Latino of any race were 2.4% of the population.

There were 699 households, of which 29.6% had children under the age of 18 living with them, 43.5% were married couples living together, 13.2% had a female householder with no husband present, 4.4% had a male householder with no wife present, and 38.9% were non-families. 31.9% of all households were made up of individuals, and 19.1% had someone living alone who was 65 years of age or older. The average household size was 2.36 and the average family size was 2.95.

The median age in the city was 37.4 years. 24.6% of residents were under the age of 18; 7.7% were between the ages of 18 and 24; 28.8% were from 25 to 44; 21.7% were from 45 to 64; and 17.1% were 65 years of age or older. The gender makeup of the city was 47.7% male and 52.3% female.

=== 2000 census ===
As of the 2000 census, there were 1,454 people, 555 households, and 376 families living in the city. The population density was 800.2 people per square mile (308.5/km^{2}). There were 583 housing units at an average density of 320.9 per square mile (123.7/km^{2}). The racial makeup of the city was 94.36% White, 0.21% African American, 0.89% Native American, 0.28% Asian, 0.76% from other races, and 3.51% from two or more races. Hispanic or Latino of any race were 2.20% of the population.

There were 555 households, out of which 32.1% had children under the age of 18 living with them, 50.3% were married couples living together, 13.7% had a female householder with no husband present, and 32.1% were non-families. 27.2% of all households were made up of individuals, and 13.2% had someone living alone who was 65 years of age or older. The average household size was 2.48 and the average family size was 3.00.

In the city, the population was spread out, with 25.0% under the age of 18, 7.7% from 18 to 24, 27.0% from 25 to 44, 21.5% from 45 to 64, and 18.8% who were 65 years of age or older. The median age was 38 years. For every 100 females, there were 91.1 males. For every 100 females age 18 and over, there were 87.0 males.

The median income for a household in the city was $30,769, and the median income for a family was $36,534. Males had a median income of $33,421 versus $25,417 for females. The per capita income for the city was $14,249. About 12.2% of families and 17.8% of the population were below the poverty line, including 22.9% of those under age 18 and 24.5% of those age 65 or over.

== Government ==
McCleary has a mayor–council government with an elected mayor and city council. The council has five members who are each elected from their respective districts.

As of 2023, the City of McCleary operated a $12.9 million annual budget, of which approximately $3 million was spent on payroll; the city employed 27 staff.

== Education ==
Primary education in McCleary is provided by the McCleary School District. Most high school students travel to Elma or Capital High School.

In 1901, there was a one-room class serving 60 students. In 1909, the district was official and a school was built on the current location. McCleary has since then had four remodels. As of 2026, the school serves 30 preschoolers and 350 students between kindergarten and 8th grade.

In 1988, the McCleary School District began a scholarship program for its students. Pupils who graduated high school, and also completed their 8th grade class in McCleary Elementary School, are awarded a scholarship; the scholarship is equal to the sum of $55 per year of attendance, including kindergarten. The fund may be used for college or any type of skilled training or trade school.

== Infrastructure ==
As part of the Chehalis Basin Strategy's Aquatic Species Restoration Plan, the Middle Fork Wildcat Creek, a Cloquallum Creek tributary in McCleary, received attention to restore natural fish passages for spawning salmon and trout. The project included the removal of 3 culverts, replacing them with bridges over the creek. The culverts also caused local flooding due to debris buildup. The 2022 project cost a combined $1.7 million, including over $400,000 from the county, and expanded forest and aquatic habitat on the Middle Fork by over 4.0 miles (6.4 km).

== Sister cities ==
- Rossington, England, United Kingdom

== Notable people ==
- Clarence Chesterfield Howerton, circus performer
- Angelo Pellegrini, author
