= Mason County, Washington =

County in Washington, United States

- County
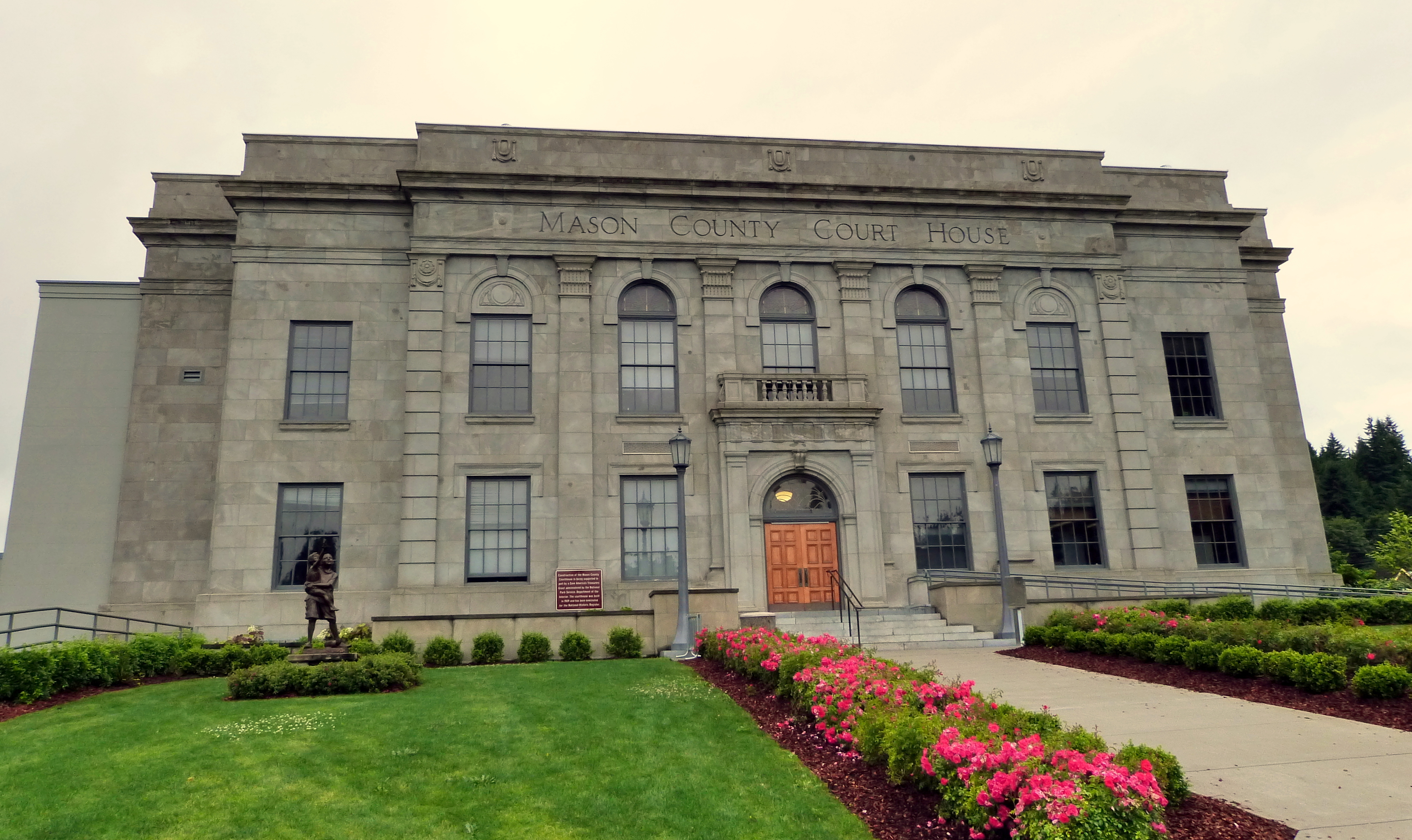
- Mason County Courthouse

- Location within the U.S. state of Washington
- Coordinates: 47°21′N 123°11′W
- Country: United States
- State: Washington
- Founded: March 13, 1854
- Named for: Charles H. Mason
- Seat: Shelton
- Largest city: Shelton

Area
  - Total: 1,051 sq mi (2,720 km^{2})
  - Land: 959 sq mi (2,480 km^{2})
  - Water: 92 sq mi (240 km^{2}) 8.7%

Population (2020)
  - Total: 65,726
  - Estimate (2025): 71,165 ▲
  - Density: 63/sq mi (24/km^{2})
- Time zone: UTC−8 (Pacific)
  - Summer (DST): UTC−7 (PDT)
- Congressional district: 6th
- Website: masoncountywa.gov

Mason County is a county located in the U.S. state of Washington. As of the 2020 census, the population was 65,726. The county seat and only incorporated city is Shelton. The county was formed out of Thurston County on March 13, 1854. Originally named Sawamish County, it took its present name in 1864 in honor of Charles H. Mason, the first Secretary of Washington Territory.

Mason County comprises the Shelton micropolitan statistical area and is included in the Seattle-Tacoma combined statistical area.

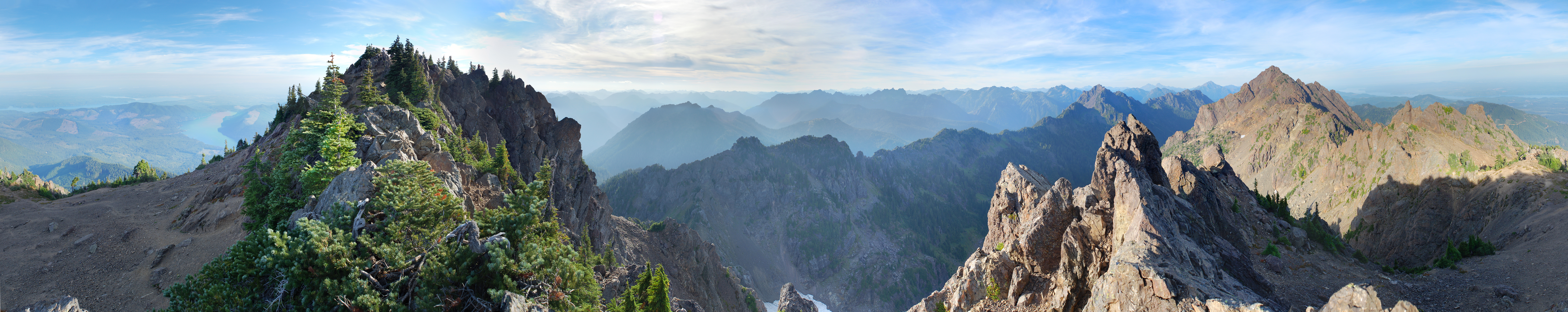
Peak of Mount Ellinor in the Olympic Mountains of Mason County

== Geography ==
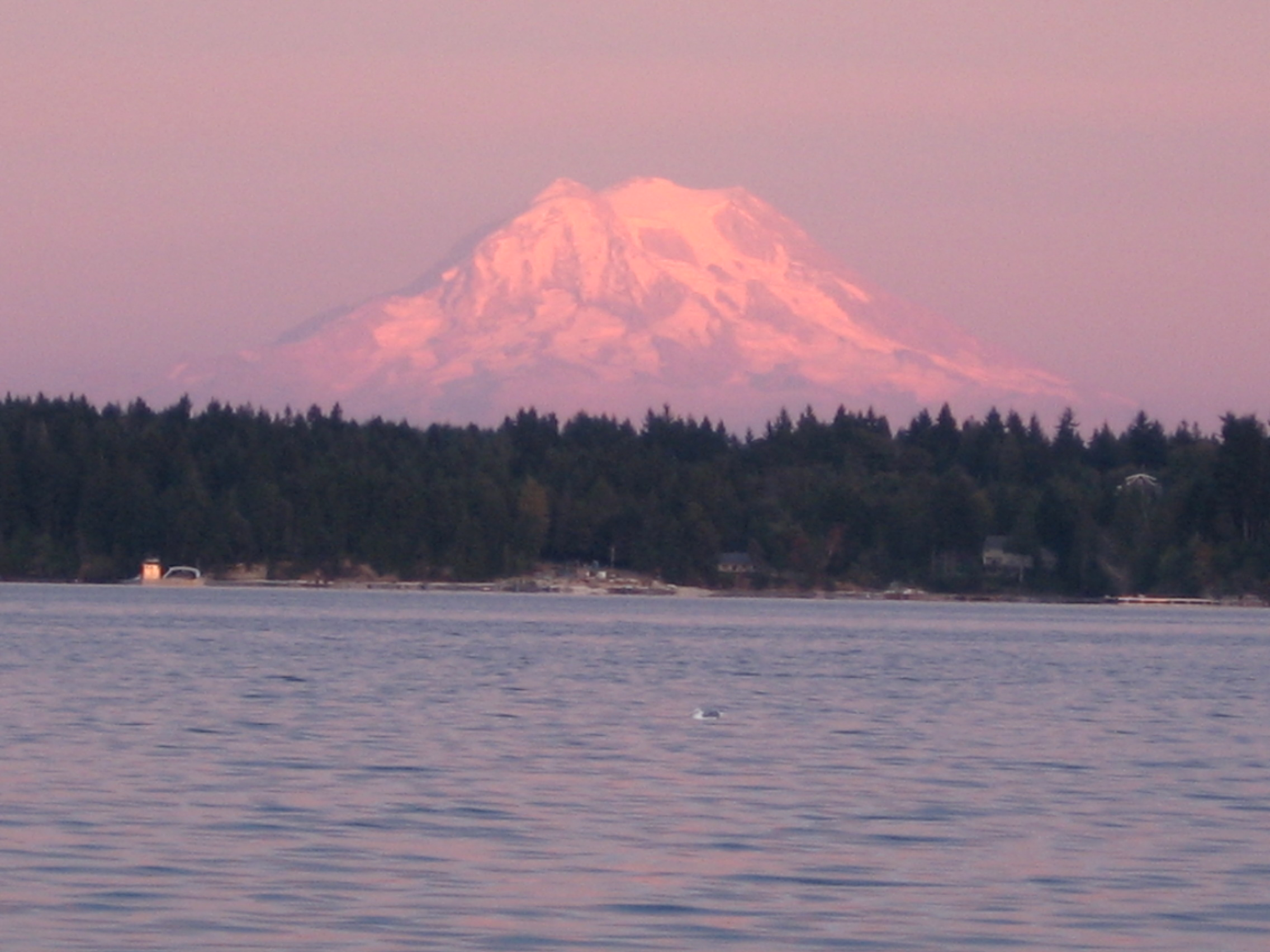
Mount Rainier over the Totten Inlet Mason County, Washington

According to the United States Census Bureau, the county has a total area of 1,051 square miles (2,720 km^{2}), of which 959 square miles (2,480 km^{2}) is land and 92 square miles (240 km^{2}) (8.7%) is water.

=== Geographic features ===
- Brown Cove
- Case Inlet
- Hammersley Inlet
- Harstine Island
- Hood Canal
- Lake Cushman
- Mason Lake
- Olympic Mountains
- Puget Sound
- Squaxin Island
- Totten Inlet

Oakland Bay

=== Major highways ===
- U.S. 101
- SR 3
- SR 108
- SR 106

=== Adjacent counties ===
- Jefferson County – northwest
- Kitsap County – northeast
- Pierce County – east/southeast
- Thurston County – southeast
- Grays Harbor County – southwest

=== National protected areas ===
- Olympic National Forest (part)
- Olympic National Park (part)

== Demographics ==
Historical population
| Census | Pop. | Note | %± |
|---|---|---|---|
| 1860 | 162 | | — |
| 1870 | 289 | | 78.4% |
| 1880 | 639 | | 121.1% |
| 1890 | 2,826 | | 342.3% |
| 1900 | 3,810 | | 34.8% |
| 1910 | 5,156 | | 35.3% |
| 1920 | 4,919 | | −4.6% |
| 1930 | 10,060 | | 104.5% |
| 1940 | 11,603 | | 15.3% |
| 1950 | 15,022 | | 29.5% |
| 1960 | 16,251 | | 8.2% |
| 1970 | 20,918 | | 28.7% |
| 1980 | 31,184 | | 49.1% |
| 1990 | 38,341 | | 23.0% |
| 2000 | 49,405 | | 28.9% |
| 2010 | 60,699 | | 22.9% |
| 2020 | 65,726 | | 8.3% |
| 2025 (est.) | 71,165 | ▲ | 8.3% |
U.S. Decennial Census; 1790–1960 1900–1990; 1990–2000 2010–2020

=== 2020 census ===
As of the 2020 census, the county had a population of 65,726. Of the residents, 19.0% were under the age of 18 and 23.8% were 65 years of age or older; the median age was 45.8 years. For every 100 females there were 106.2 males, and for every 100 females age 18 and over there were 106.7 males. 30.5% of residents lived in urban areas and 69.5% lived in rural areas.

Mason County, Washington – Racial and ethnic composition Note: the US Census treats Hispanic/Latino as an ethnic category. This table excludes Latinos from the racial categories and assigns them to a separate category. Hispanics/Latinos may be of any race.
| Race / Ethnicity (NH = Non-Hispanic) | Pop 2000 | Pop 2010 | Pop 2020 | % 2000 | % 2010 | % 2020 |
|---|---|---|---|---|---|---|
| White alone (NH) | 42,636 | 50,349 | 49,591 | 86.30% | 82.95% | 75.45% |
| Black or African American alone (NH) | 562 | 609 | 688 | 1.14% | 1.00% | 1.05% |
| Native American or Alaska Native alone (NH) | 1,722 | 1,864 | 1,959 | 3.49% | 3.07% | 2.98% |
| Asian alone (NH) | 512 | 692 | 758 | 1.04% | 1.14% | 1.15% |
| Pacific Islander alone (NH) | 208 | 214 | 216 | 0.42% | 0.35% | 0.33% |
| Other race alone (NH) | 107 | 81 | 422 | 0.22% | 0.13% | 0.64% |
| Mixed race or Multiracial (NH) | 1,297 | 2,046 | 4,497 | 2.63% | 3.37% | 6.84% |
| Hispanic or Latino (any race) | 2,361 | 4,844 | 7,595 | 4.78% | 7.98% | 11.56% |
| Total | 49,405 | 60,699 | 65,726 | 100.00% | 100.00% | 100.00% |

The racial makeup of the county was 77.6% White, 1.1% Black or African American, 4.0% American Indian and Alaska Native, 1.2% Asian, 5.8% from some other race, and 10.0% from two or more races. Hispanic or Latino residents of any race comprised 11.6% of the population.

There were 25,505 households in the county, of which 24.9% had children under the age of 18 living with them and 22.0% had a female householder with no spouse or partner present. About 25.9% of all households were made up of individuals and 13.3% had someone living alone who was 65 years of age or older.

There were 33,269 housing units, of which 23.3% were vacant. Among occupied housing units, 79.5% were owner-occupied and 20.5% were renter-occupied. The homeowner vacancy rate was 1.7% and the rental vacancy rate was 5.0%.

=== 2010 census ===
As of the 2010 census, there were 60,699 people, 23,832 households, and 16,057 families living in the county. The population density was 63.3 inhabitants per square mile (24.4/km^{2}). There were 32,518 housing units at an average density of 33.9 units per square mile (13.1 units/km^{2}). The racial makeup of the county was 86.1% white, 3.7% American Indian, 1.2% Asian, 1.1% black or African American, 0.4% Pacific islander, 3.4% from other races, and 4.1% from two or more races. Those of Hispanic or Latino origin made up 8.0% of the population. In terms of ancestry, 19.7% were German, 13.8% were English, 13.5% were Irish, 6.7% were Norwegian, and 4.9% were American.

Of the 23,832 households, 27.0% had children under the age of 18 living with them, 52.5% were married couples living together, 9.5% had a female householder with no husband present, 32.6% were non-families, and 25.3% of all households were made up of individuals. The average household size was 2.45 and the average family size was 2.87. The median age was 44.4 years.

The median income for a household in the county was $48,104 and the median income for a family was $56,809. Males had a median income of $44,992 versus $33,982 for females. The per capita income for the county was $22,530. About 11.1% of families and 15.6% of the population were below the poverty line, including 21.0% of those under age 18 and 9.0% of those age 65 or over.

=== 2000 census ===
As of the 2000 census, there were 49,405 people, 18,912 households, and 13,389 families living in the county. The population density was 51 people per square mile (20 people/km^{2}). There were 25,515 housing units at an average density of 26 units per square mile (10 units/km^{2}). The racial makeup of the county was 88.46% White, 1.19% Black or African American, 3.72% Native American, 1.05% Asian, 0.45% Pacific Islander, 2.10% from other races, and 3.03% from two or more races. 4.78% of the population were Hispanic or Latino of any race. 16.7% were of German, 9.9% Irish, 9.8% English, 8.6% United States or American and 6.8% Norwegian ancestry.

There were 18,912 households, out of which 28.90% had children under the age of 18 living with them, 56.90% were married couples living together, 9.20% had a female householder with no husband present, and 29.20% were non-families. 23.30% of all households were made up of individuals, and 9.90% had someone living alone who was 65 years of age or older. The average household size was 2.49 and the average family size was 2.89.

In the county, the population was spread out, with 23.50% under the age of 18, 7.70% from 18 to 24, 26.50% from 25 to 44, 25.80% from 45 to 64, and 16.50% who were 65 years of age or older. The median age was 40 years. For every 100 females there were 107.00 males. For every 100 females age 18 and over, there were 107.30 males.

The median income for a household in the county was $39,586, and the median income for a family was $44,246. Males had a median income of $37,007 versus $25,817 for females. The per capita income for the county was $18,056. About 8.80% of families and 12.20% of the population were below the poverty line, including 17.30% of those under age 18 and 4.90% of those age 65 or over.

== Communities ==
=== City ===
- Shelton (county seat)

=== Census-designated places ===
- Allyn
- Allyn-Grapeview (former)
- Belfair
- Grapeview
- Hoodsport
- Skokomish
- Union

=== Unincorporated communities ===
- Bayshore
- Eldon
- Harstine Island
- Kamilche
- Lake Cushman
- Lilliwaup
- Matlock
- Mohrweis
- Potlatch
- Tahuya

== Government ==
=== Board of county commissioners ===
- District 1 (North Mason) - Randy Neatherlin, elected 2013
- District 2 (West Mason) - Kevin Shutty, elected 2017
- District 3 (Central Mason) - Sharon Trask, elected 2019

=== State legislators ===
==== 35th Legislative District ====
- Sen. Drew MacEwan (R)
- Rep. Dan Griffey (R)
- Rep. Travis Couture (R)

== Politics ==
Mason County leans toward the Republican Party, voting for its candidates in state elections consistently since the 2004 Washington gubernatorial election. In presidential races, Democrats held a small edge in the county until the 2016 election, in which Donald Trump won a plurality of votes.

United States presidential election results for Mason County, Washington
| Year | Republican | | Democratic | | Third party(ies) | |
| Year | No. | % | No. | % | No. | % |
|---|---|---|---|---|---|---|
| 1892 | 352 | 42.00% | 356 | 42.48% | 130 | 15.51% |
| 1896 | 397 | 36.86% | 667 | 61.93% | 13 | 1.21% |
| 1900 | 514 | 51.40% | 455 | 45.50% | 31 | 3.10% |
| 1904 | 661 | 63.50% | 315 | 30.26% | 65 | 6.24% |
| 1908 | 553 | 56.60% | 318 | 32.55% | 106 | 10.85% |
| 1912 | 439 | 24.42% | 522 | 29.03% | 837 | 46.55% |
| 1916 | 764 | 44.32% | 779 | 45.19% | 181 | 10.50% |
| 1920 | 997 | 56.04% | 383 | 21.53% | 399 | 22.43% |
| 1924 | 902 | 49.02% | 179 | 9.73% | 759 | 41.25% |
| 1928 | 1,745 | 62.95% | 992 | 35.79% | 35 | 1.26% |
| 1932 | 995 | 25.50% | 2,181 | 55.89% | 726 | 18.61% |
| 1936 | 1,015 | 23.08% | 3,087 | 70.19% | 296 | 6.73% |
| 1940 | 1,775 | 33.20% | 3,465 | 64.81% | 106 | 1.98% |
| 1944 | 1,976 | 36.61% | 3,379 | 62.61% | 42 | 0.78% |
| 1948 | 2,524 | 38.82% | 3,613 | 55.58% | 364 | 5.60% |
| 1952 | 3,827 | 49.70% | 3,830 | 49.74% | 43 | 0.56% |
| 1956 | 4,026 | 51.05% | 3,840 | 48.69% | 20 | 0.25% |
| 1960 | 3,703 | 46.86% | 4,183 | 52.94% | 16 | 0.20% |
| 1964 | 2,549 | 31.58% | 5,514 | 68.32% | 8 | 0.10% |
| 1968 | 3,397 | 39.55% | 4,540 | 52.85% | 653 | 7.60% |
| 1972 | 4,873 | 53.10% | 3,907 | 42.57% | 397 | 4.33% |
| 1976 | 4,758 | 42.14% | 6,060 | 53.67% | 473 | 4.19% |
| 1980 | 6,745 | 49.10% | 5,241 | 38.15% | 1,751 | 12.75% |
| 1984 | 8,410 | 53.74% | 7,007 | 44.77% | 233 | 1.49% |
| 1988 | 7,426 | 47.77% | 7,826 | 50.34% | 293 | 1.88% |
| 1992 | 5,776 | 29.43% | 8,076 | 41.15% | 5,774 | 29.42% |
| 1996 | 7,149 | 34.45% | 10,088 | 48.62% | 3,513 | 16.93% |
| 2000 | 10,257 | 45.63% | 10,876 | 48.38% | 1,347 | 5.99% |
| 2004 | 11,987 | 47.20% | 12,894 | 50.78% | 513 | 2.02% |
| 2008 | 12,600 | 44.51% | 15,050 | 53.17% | 656 | 2.32% |
| 2012 | 12,761 | 45.20% | 14,764 | 52.29% | 710 | 2.51% |
| 2016 | 13,677 | 47.16% | 11,993 | 41.35% | 3,333 | 11.49% |
| 2020 | 18,710 | 50.16% | 17,269 | 46.29% | 1,324 | 3.55% |
| 2024 | 18,127 | 49.41% | 17,215 | 46.92% | 1,347 | 3.67% |

== Healthcare ==
Mason County has one hospital, Mason General Hospital, in Shelton, operated by Washington Public Hospital District No. 1.

== See also ==
- National Register of Historic Places listings in Mason County, Washington
