= Joseph George Megler =

American politician

J.G. Megler
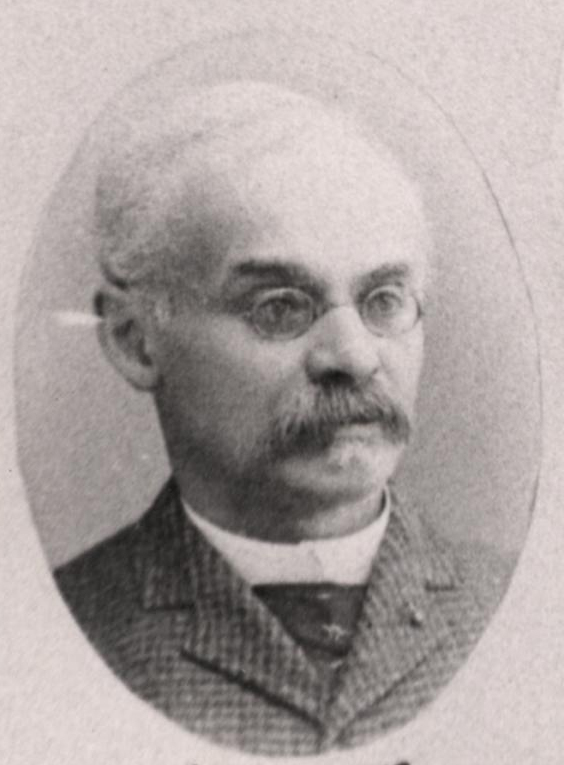
- J.G. Megler pictured in 1895

7th President pro tempore of the Washington Senate
- In office January 14, 1901 – January 12, 1903
- Preceded by: Augustus High
- Succeeded by: T. B. Sumner

9th Speaker of the Washington House of Representatives
- In office January 9, 1905 – January 14, 1907
- Preceded by: W. H. Hare
- Succeeded by: Jacob Falconer

Member of the Washington House of Representatives from the 25th district
- In office 1903 – 1909, 1911 – 1913

Member of the Washington House of Representatives from the 24th district
- In office 1891–1893

Member of the Washington Senate from the 14th district
- In office 1895–1903

Personal details
- Born: March 10, 1838 Berkach, Thuringen, Germany
- Died: September 10, 1915 (aged 77) Brookfield, Washington, U.S.A.
- Party: Republican
- Spouse: Nellie E. Smith

Joseph George Megler (March 10, 1838 – September 10, 1915), generally known as J.G. Megler, was a German-American salmon cannery owner and politician in Washington. He was a member of the Washington House of Representatives for the first legislature in 1889 and five terms thereafter. He was also a member of the Washington State Senate for two terms.

During his political career he held the positions of Speaker of the House and President pro tempore of the Senate. He has been described as the father of the salmon hatcheries in Washington.

== Early life ==
J.G. Megler was born in Berkach, Thuringen, Germany, in 1838, the first child of a schoolteacher. Left an orphan by the age of 9, he emigrated to the U.S. along with his younger brother and two sisters to join an uncle in New York. Some years later they relocated to Syracuse, where he studied the trade of tinsmithing.

Megler entered military service for the Civil War at Cairo, Illinois, on December 19, 1861 for the Union. He began as a paymasters clerk on the gunboat Lexington, and was soon promoted to Master's Mate and then Ensign. During the war he saw action in the battles of Fort Henry, Donelson, Shiloh, Vicksburg and Red River. He was honorably discharged at New York in October 1865 and joined his brother, Alexander Megler, in Astoria, Oregon late that year. There he briefly joined his brother in running the Astoria Hotel; however within two years he sold his share in the business to Alexander Megler and returned to the business of tinsmithing.

== J.G. Megler Co. ==
In 1871, Megler moved across the Columbia River to Chinook, Washington to join the salmon cannery of Ellis, Jewett and Chambers as the manager. The business subsequently became the cannery of Megler & Jewett.

In 1873, he built a salmon cannery on the Washington side of the Columbia River by Jim Crow Point, naming the place Brookfield in honor of his wife Nellie Smith's birthplace of North Brookfield, Massachusetts. He bought out his partners and established the business under the name of J.G. Megler & Company. Over the years J.G. Megler & Co. expanded operations, building and running an additional salmon cannery in Aberdeen, Washington from 1887 to around 1893, continuing to operate a fish receiving station at the site of his old cannery (now known as Megler Cove), and adding a dock across the river in Astoria.

Megler was a relentless innovator, bringing new technologies and practices to his cannery. In 1904, the Brookfield cannery had two canning lines, making it one of the larger canneries on the Columbia River. By 1927, it had a capacity of 5 lines.

Megler quickly recognized the danger of overfishing on the Columbia and was an early proponent of legislated fishing limits and of fish hatcheries as a method to combat the collapse of salmon fisheries as seen in California and on the East Coast. He was one of the founders of The Oregon & Washington Fish Propagating Co., a collection of Columbia River salmon packers who in 1877 established the first salmon hatchery in the Pacific Northwest on a tributary of the Clackamas River in Oregon. In 1888, it became a station of the United States Fish Commission.

After Megler's death in 1915, his wife Nellie Megler took over the company and ran it until 1925, when external managers were brought in. J.G. Megler & Co. continued to operate as an independent business until the cannery burned in 1931. The company's continuous production of canned salmon from 1873 till 1930 made it one of the longest running canneries on the Columbia River. The cannery was not rebuilt and the town of Brookfield was slowly abandoned.

== Political career ==
J.G. Megler was elected a member of the House of Representatives of the first Washington legislature in 1889 representing Wahkiakum County, Washington, running as part of the Republican ticket, and was re-elected to the second legislature in 1891 from the newly created District 24 based in Wahkiakum County. In 1893, he lost his seat to J.J. Foster, a Democrat.

In 1895, he ran instead for a seat in the Senate for the Republican party. He served as Republican senator of the fourteenth district, comprising the counties of Cowlitz, Pacific and Wahkiakum, in the fourth session in 1895 and the fifth session in 1899. In 1901, he was elected President pro tempore of the Senate.

In 1903, 1905 and 1907 (8th, 9th and 10th legislative sessions) he represented Wahkiakum County (then District 25) in the House of Representatives. In 1905 he was elected Speaker of the House. He received ninety votes to four votes for his opponent, and one of the four was his own vote. In 1909, he was replaced by Republican Joseph R. Burke, but in 1911 he reclaimed the seat for the twelfth legislative session.

As of 2014, he is one of only three people who have held both the positions of Speaker of the House and President pro tempore of the Senate of Washington State (the others being Howard D. Taylor and Victor Zednick).

He was active in supporting the development of state-supported fish hatcheries, negotiating with the United States Fish Commission, creating a fish commission, and in promoting legislation for the fisheries, including negotiating with the state of Oregon on rules governing fishing on the Columbia River. A consummate back-room deal maker who preferred to operate out of the public eye, he was known for his organizational abilities.

A biographer of the 1905 session said: "It can be truthfully said that no name in the present legislature or any previous one in this state has been so continuously connected with the legislative history of the state as the Hon. J.G. Megler."

== Death ==
J.G. Megler died on September 10, 1915, at his home in Brookfield, Washington. He was survived by his wife Nellie.

Megler, Washington and Megler Cove, the bay in which J.G. and later his wife ran a fish-receiving station (and perhaps a cannery) from 1891 till 1930 were named for him. The Astoria-Megler Ferry ran from Megler in Washington to Astoria from 1921 to 1966, when it was replaced by the Astoria–Megler Bridge. In 2005, the Megler Rest Area was renamed "Dismal Nitch" as part of the Lewis and Clark Memorial project, although some historians dispute that this location is in fact correctly identified.
