= Dismal Nitch =

Cove on the Columbia River in Washington state, US

Coordinates: 46.250°N 123.863°W

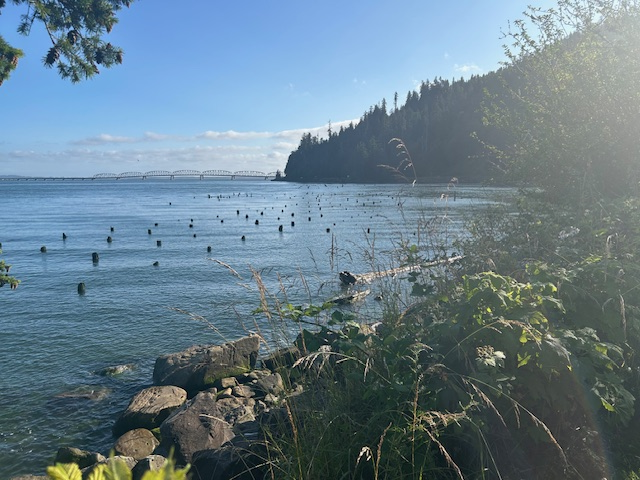
Dismal Nitch

Dismal Nitch is the name of a cove along the lower Columbia River in Washington state, notable as the Lewis and Clark Expedition's last campsite before sighting the Pacific Ocean.

Today, the area has a rest stop on the Washington State Route 401 highway just east of the Astoria–Megler Bridge, with a short trail to a 2009 monument. The rest area and monument are officially part of Lewis and Clark National Historical Park.

== History ==
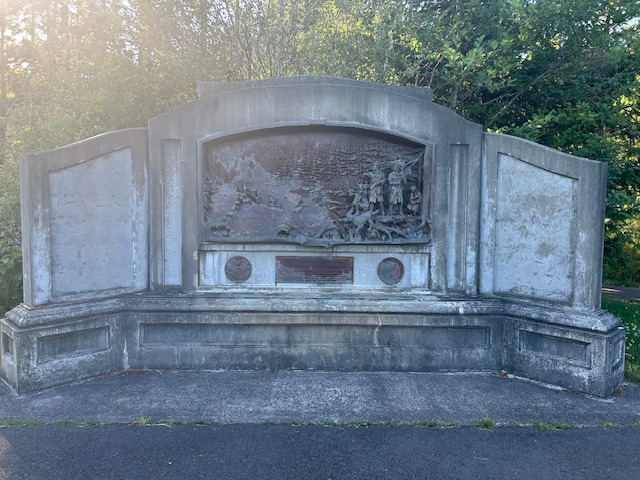
The 2009 Monument

In 1805, the Lewis and Clark Expedition Corps of Discovery were low on supplies and traveling rapidly down the Columbia River, intending to meet one of the last trading ships of the season, hoping to secure needed supplies and to send back journals and specimens home as requested by President Thomas Jefferson. On November 10, 1805, a severe winter storm struck the area, forcing them off the river for six days and preventing them from meeting the supply ships. The group landed in a cove on the north bank of the river that Captain William Clark called in his journals "that dismal little nitch". With no more fresh food and their soaked clothes literally rotting away, he wrote that "A feeling person would be distressed by our situation" and was concerned for the Corps safety for just the second time in the expedition, in danger of foundering just a few miles short. Upon the arrival of calm weather, the company left in great haste and moved to Station Camp on the west side of Point Ellice (referred to by Clark as "blustering point", "Stormey point", and "Point Distress."), and camped at that location for 10 days before relocating for the winter to what would become Fort Clatsop.

In the 1870s and 1880s, Joseph G. Megler operated a fish buying station on the east side of Point Ellice in Clark's "Dismal Nitch", and it in time became known as Megler Cove.

In 1921, increased tourism to the nearby Long Beach Peninsula led to creation of a car ferry between Astoria and the Megler dock. In 1946, the Oregon Highway Department purchased the ferry service and operated it until the Astoria–Megler bridge was completed. In 1956, Washington State Route 401 was constructed east of Megler, and construction of the Astoria–Megler Bridge began in 1962 and was completed in 1966. The last ferry run occurred in July of that year. In 1968 and 1969, the Washington Department of Highways demolished the ferry landing and constructed the Megler Rest Area in its place. The Megler Rest Area was renamed the Dismal Nitch Rest Area in 2005.

== Exact location ==
While the official site is commemorated as being about 500 feet west of the rest area, some historians in recent years believe that the actual location of Lewis and Clark's camp may be 1/2 mile the opposite direction.

== See also ==
- Cape Disappointment
- Megler, Washington
