= MV Kitsap (1925) =

The M/V Kitsap was a ferry built in 1925 at the Lake Washington Shipyard in Houghton, Washington (now part of Kirkland). She was 165 feet (50 m) long, and her original capacity in 1925 was 95 cars and approximately 800 passengers. By 1960, cars had become much bigger and her capacity was reduced to 32 modern automobiles and 325 passengers. A 600-horsepower Estep diesel engine allowed her to sail at 12 knots (22 km/h; 14 mph) when originally built. Almost every part of her was from Washington state; her hull and superstructure were built from Washington-grown fir, and her Estep engine was built in at Washington Iron Works in Tacoma.

She was owned originally by the Kitsap County Transportation Company (KCTC), and was the first in a series of ferries (the others being the MV Bainbridge and MV Vashon) that provided some serious competition to the Puget Sound Navigation Company (PSN), which was the other dominant ferry operator on Puget Sound. She first entered service on the Fauntleroy-Vashon route and sailed there until 1930 when she was moved over to the Suquamish-Ballard route.

A strike in 1935 resulted in KCTC being acquired by PSN, making PSN the sole ferry operator on Puget Sound. PSN kept her on the Suquamish-Ballard route until 1938, when they moved her to the Mukilteo-Clinton ferry route. In 1940, she was on the Port Townsend-Keystone ferry route but returned to Mukilteo-Clinton a year later, where she remained until World War II ended. She was assigned to the Point Defiance-Tahlequah run from 1947 to 1949.

In 1951, almost all of PSN's ferries and routes were acquired by Washington State Ferries (WSF), including the ferry Kitsap. She was assigned to the Lofall-South Point route across Hood Canal, where she supplemented the newer MV Rhododendron.

The Hood Canal Bridge opened in 1961, and WSF no longer needed the Kitsap. In 1961, she was sold to the Oregon Department of Transportation for use on the Astoria–Megler ferry route across the Columbia River. In 1966, the Astoria–Megler Bridge opened, putting the Kitsap and other ferries that served the route out of service. Kitsap was sold to a private party to be used as a fish cannery.

She sank while being towed to Alaska on 3 November 1966.

A new, much larger ferry with the same name was built in 1980, and is still in service on Puget Sound.
