= Washington State Route 401 =

State highway in Pacific County, Washington, US

State Route 401

- SR 401 highlighted in red

Route information
- Maintained by WSDOT
- Length: 12.13 mi (19.52 km)
- Existed: 1964–present
- Tourist routes: Lewis and Clark Trail

Major junctions
- South end: US 101 in Megler
- North end: SR 4 in Naselle

Location
- Country: United States
- State: Washington
- Counties: Pacific

Highway system
- State highways in Washington; Interstate; US; State; Scenic; Pre-1964; 1964 renumbering; Former
← SR 397	→ I-405

State Route 401 (SR 401) is a 12.13-mile (19.52 km) long state highway in Pacific County within the U.S. state of Washington. The highway originates at the north end of the Astoria–Megler Bridge west of Megler at an intersection with U.S. Route 101 (US 101). The roadway travels northeast, paralleling cliffs, the Columbia River and the South Fork of the Naselle River to Naselle, ending at SR 4. The road was designated Secondary State Highway 12B (SSH 12) between 1937 and 1964, when SR 401 was created to replace SSH 12B. The Astoria–Megler Bridge, completed in 1966, replaced a ferry east of the bridge, where the highway originally ended, and is known locally as Kingston Ferry Road. The roadway was extended west to the north end of the bridge, where it currently terminates. The former ferry terminal became the Dismal Nitch rest area, named after the Lewis and Clark Expedition's description of the place.

== Route description ==
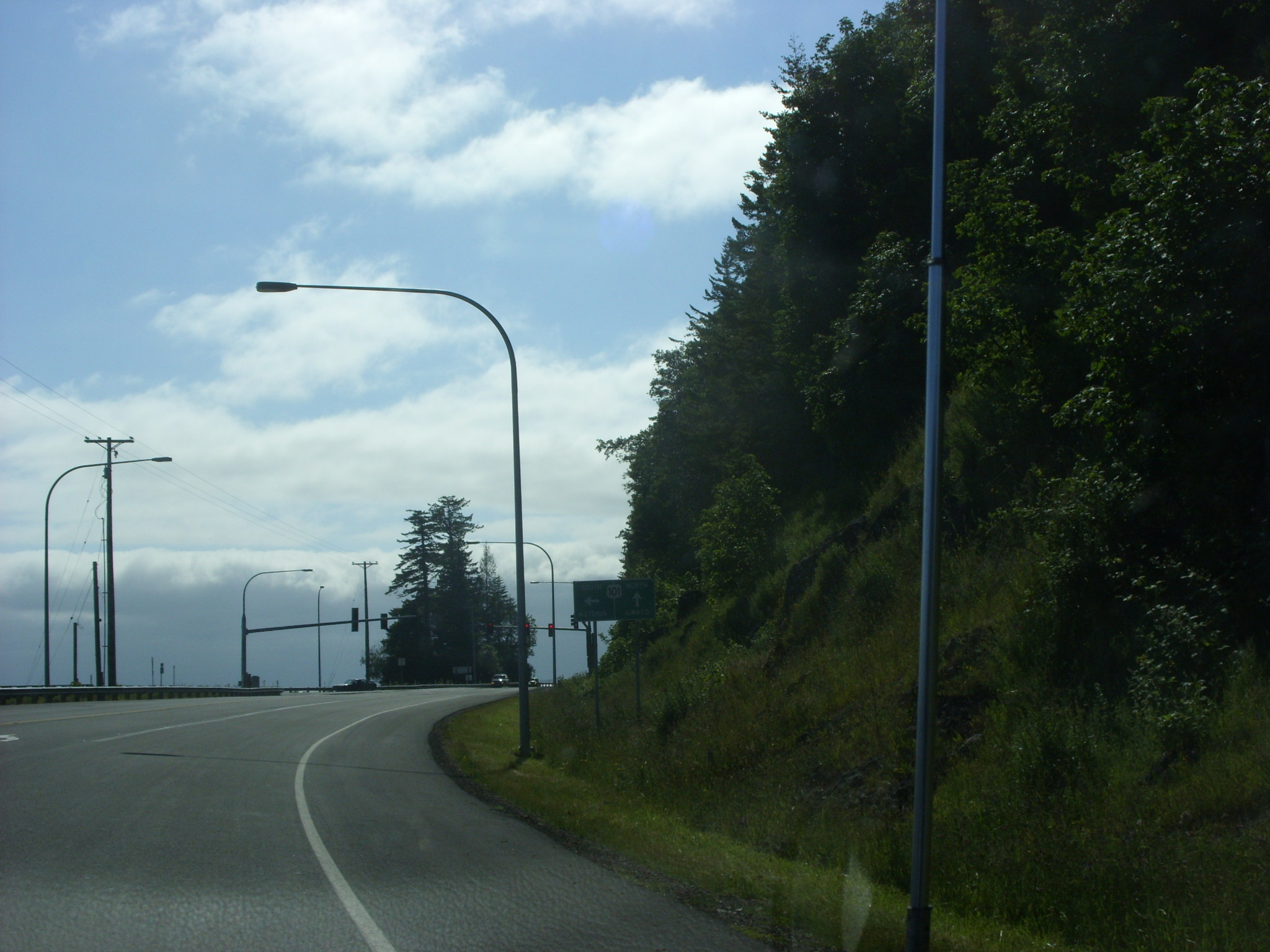
The southern terminus of SR 401 at U.S. Route 101 (US 101), located at the north end of the Astoria–Megler Bridge west of Megler.

SR 401 originates at an intersection with U.S. Route 101 (US 101) at the north end of the Astoria–Megler Bridge west of Megler and southeast of McGowan. Traveling northeast between cliffs and the Columbia River past the Dismal Nitch Safety rest area to Knappton, the highway turns north along more cliffs and the South Fork of the Naselle River. In Naselle, the South Fork merges with the Naselle River, which the roadway crosses over three times before terminating at SR 4. The intersection with SR 4 is also the busiest segment of the road with an estimated daily average of 2,800 motorists, which has been decreasing from 3,100 motorists in 2005.

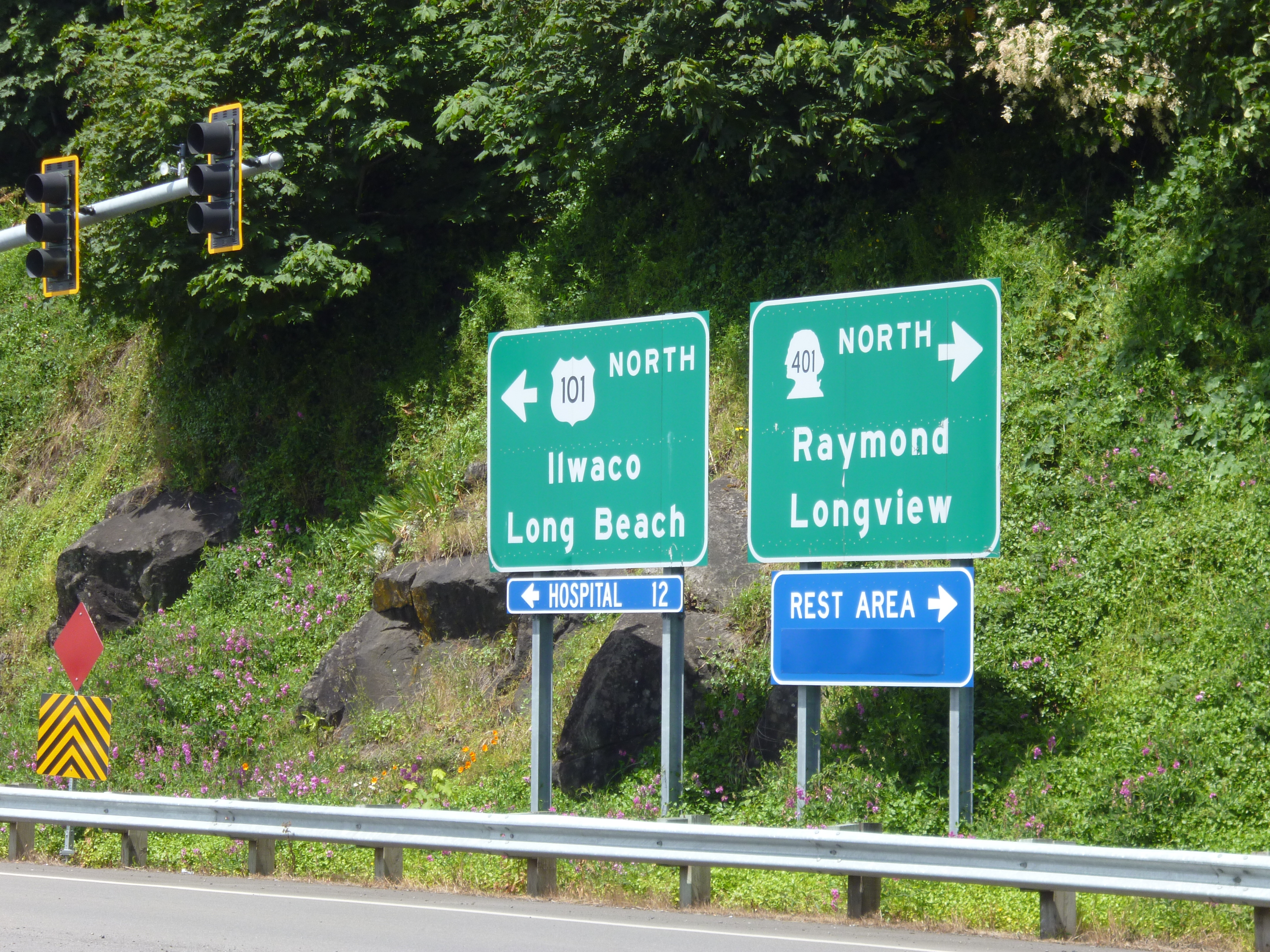
Start of US 101 in Washington.

== History ==
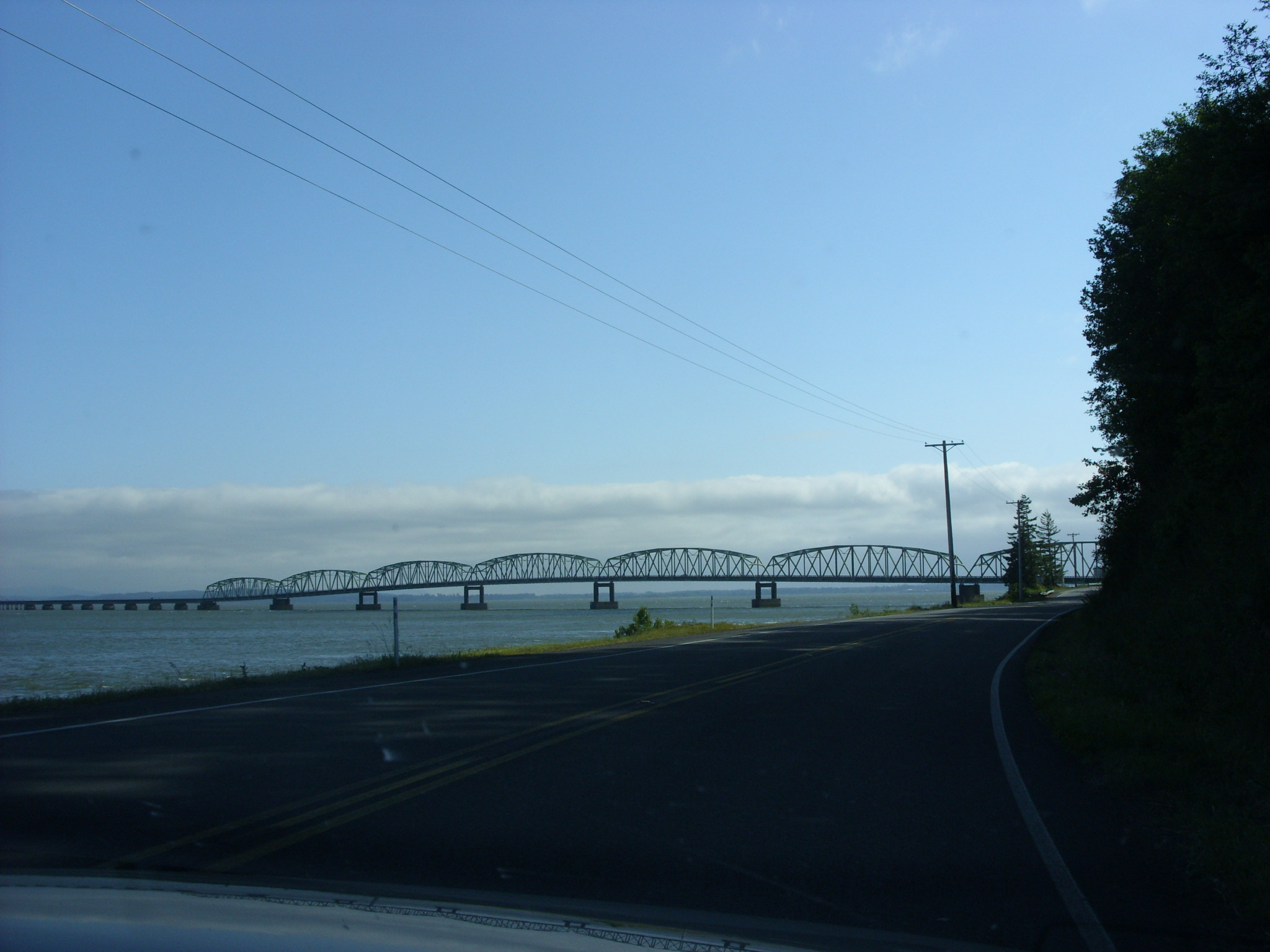
The Astoria–Megler Bridge, which carries U.S. Route 101 (US 101) across the Columbia River, was completed in 1966 and SR 401 was extended west from the former Astoria-Megler ferry landing to the new bridge.

Secondary State Highway 12B (SSH 12B) was created during the 1937 establishment of the Primary and secondary state highway system as an auxiliary route of Primary State Highway 12 (PSH 12), co-signed as both U.S. Route 101 (US 101) and US 830. The highway ran from PSH 12 / US 101 at the Megler ferry landing on the Columbia River to PSH 12 / US 830 in Naselle, with a gap between Megler and Knappton. The full highway was opened in October 1962, ahead of the expected completion of the Astoria–Megler Bridge, which opened in 1966.

SSH 12B became SR 401 during the 1964 highway renumbering. The Dismal Nitch Safety rest area, formerly the Megler Landing Rest Area, was remodeled twice in 2007 to be accessible year-round.

== Major intersections ==
The entire highway is in Pacific County.

Location	mi	km	Destinations	Notes
Megler	0.00	0.00	US 101 (Olympic Highway) / Lewis and Clark Trail – Astoria, Ilwaco	Southern terminus
Naselle	12.13	19.52	SR 4 (Ocean Beach Highway) / Lewis and Clark Trail – Raymond, Longview	Northern terminus
1.000 mi = 1.609 km; 1.000 km = 0.621 mi
