= Brookfield, Washington =

Ghost town in Washington (state)

- Ghost Town
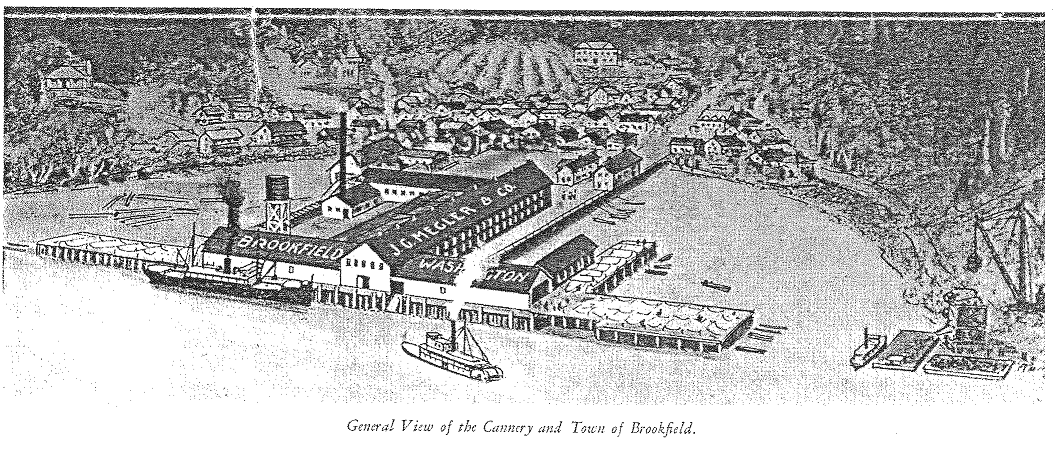
- Impression of Brookfield, 1926

- Location within Washington (state)
- Coordinates: 46°15′53″N 123°33′38″W
- Country: United States
- State: Washington
- County: Wahkiakum
- Established: 1873
- Elevation: 20 ft (6.1 m)

Population (1900)
  - Total: 479 (peak)
- Time zone: UTC-8 (Pacific (PST))
  - Summer (DST): UTC-7 (PDT)
- GNIS feature ID: 1510839

Brookfield was a salmon-canning and fishing town located on the Columbia River in Wahkiakum County, Washington, United States, from 1873 to 1957. It was the home of the J.G. Megler Company.

== History ==
Brookfield was established in 1873, when J.G.Megler built a salmon cannery in the sheltered bay on the Washington side of the Columbia River between Jim Crow Point and the mouth of Jim Crow Creek (then part of Pacific County, later part of Wahkiakum County). He named the cannery "Brookfield Fisheries", after his wife Nellie E. Megler's birthplace of North Brookfield, Massachusetts. The Brookfield post office opened on February 24, 1874 with Joseph G. Megler as postmaster.

The majority of the residents were workers at the cannery and fishermen for the cannery. J.G. Megler & Co imported Croatian fishermen from Komiza to fish for them, and these families formed many of the Brookfield residents. The company also hired a Chinese canning crew seasonally to work at the cannery.

Around 1880 the Finke Brothers opened a barrel manufacture plant on Jim Crow Creek at Brookfield. The mill burned in 1923 and the brothers moved the plant to Kalama, Washington.

The first one-room school was established in Brookfield in 1888. Around 1924, a new two-room school was built, and a second teacher added. The large, multi-docked salmon cannery commanded the bay. The Megler Mansion, a large turreted mansion, dominated the town, sitting on a ridge that provided a view across the Columbia River; the gardens featured trees from every state in the union, brought by visiting dignitaries. A street of houses ran along a road that encircled the bay, then led along Jim Crow Creek back into valley behind. The town was only accessible by boat, and was a regular stop on the ferry routes from Astoria, Oregon to Portland. After a number of years of decline, the cannery burned on July 17, 1931 and was not rebuilt. With the end of salmon canning in Brookfield, families continued to move away. By the late 1930s only a few families remained, but the school apparently remained open until 1945.

The land was purchased by Crown Zellerbach Company in 1951 for its timber. The logging company built a road into Brookfield that finally connected the town to the state road system. The post office finally closed on September 30, 1954. At the time only three families remained living at Brookfield. In 1957, Crown Zellerbach bulldozed the remains of the town, in order to protect the timber from the risk of fire.

In 2017, Jim Crow Point and Jim Crow Creek were renamed to Brookfield Point and Harlows Creek respectively.

== Geography ==
Brookfield is situated in a bay on the North shore of the Columbia River, sheltered from Pacific storms by Brookfield Point on the West, and bounded by Harlows Creek on the East, which also provided the town with fresh water via a small dam and pipe system.

Originally the bay sported a wide sandy beach and easy access to deep water via the J.G. Megler cannery dock. Crown Zellerbach modified the bay to create a log dump, filling part of the bay. Later, dredgings of the Columbia River were piled on the old Brookfield waterfront, creating large hillocks used for four-wheeling.

== Demographics ==
Historical population
Census	Pop.	Note	%±
1880	196		—
1900	479		—
1910	361		−24.6%
1920	241		−33.2%
1930	90		−62.7%
1940	24		−73.3%
U.S. Decennial Census

As a town dominated by one business - salmon canning - Brookfield's population varied seasonally, with the population rising during the summer/fall salmon canning months, when seasonal workers would move to the town for the duration of the canning season. The census numbers fluctuate wildly depending on the alignment of the date of the census with the seasonal nature of the business; thus the 1885, 1887 and 1920 numbers are likely to reflect permanent residents and exclude seasonal cannery workers.

The census records also show a significant change in the heritage of the inhabitants over the life of the town, beginning with a population consisting primarily of contract Chinese cannery workers in 1880, a large "Indian half-breed" (territorial census classification) population in 1885, and shifting to a largely Austria-Hungarian population of fishermen in the later years.
