= William A. Bugge =

William Adair Bugge (July 10, 1900 - November 14, 1992) was a civil engineer who played a major role in the development of the transportation infrastructure of the West Coast of the United States during the latter half of the 20th century.

== Background ==
William A. Bugge was born in Port Hadlock, Washington to Samuel M. & Amelia (Bishop) Bugge, his father a Norwegian immigrant and his mother the daughter of immigrants from Great Britain and some of the earliest settlers on the Quimper Peninsula. He grew up in Friday Harbor, Port Angeles, and finally Port Townsend, Washington, where he excelled in sports and graduated from high school.

== Career ==
After attending Washington State College for three and a half years, in 1922 he began work with the Washington Department of Highways engineering department. After holding public sector positions in Port Townsend and Jefferson County, Washington, and working in the private sector in Oregon and California, he was recruited by Washington Governor Arthur B. Langlie to head the state's Department of Highways. As the Director of Highways in Washington state (1949–1963) he oversaw the design and completion of some of the state's most ambitious transportation projects including the Astoria–Megler Bridge a 4-mile (6.4 km) span that crosses the Columbia River near its mouth at the Pacific Ocean. In 1953 he was recruited to fill the same position in the state of California, but declined, stating his wish to complete projects in Washington. In 1963, however, he resigned his Washington position to become the project director in charge of design and construction of the Bay Area Rapid Transit project in San Francisco, California. In 1990, William was granted an honorary bachelor's degree from Washington State University and recognized as a distinguished alumnus, a status that had been granted to only 19 others in the history of the university.

== Later years ==
Bugge retired in 1973 and died in Olympia, Washington nearly two decades later. In 1977 the Hood Canal Bridge, one of the projects he oversaw in Washington, was officially renamed the "William A. Bugge Bridge" in his honor.
