= McGowan, Washington =

Former town in Washington state, United States

Coordinates: 46°14′46″N 123°54′27″W

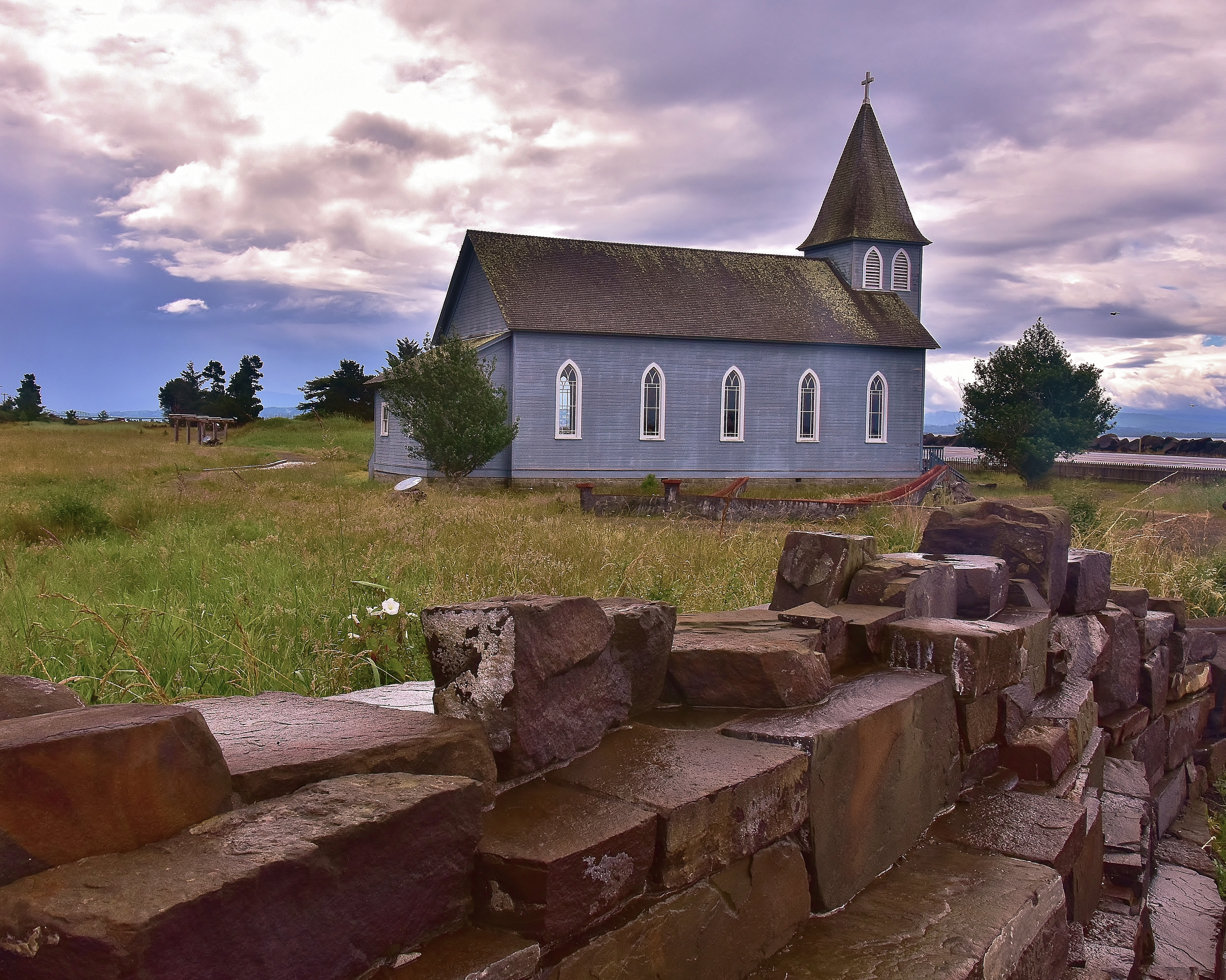
St. Mary's Catholic Church

McGowan was a stop on the Ilwaco Railway and Navigation Company's narrow gauge line that ran on the Long Beach Peninsula in Pacific County, Washington, United States from 1889 to 1930. In the late 19th century, P.J. McGowan bought land in the area for $1,200, and built his house, a dock and a salmon cannery on the site. During the railroad times, the main line and a passing siding ran through McGowan. McGowan is just west of the north end of the Astoria-Megler Bridge. The only prominent structure remaining is the old wooden Roman Catholic church. From 1925 to 1932, one of the docks of the Astoria-Megler Ferry route was located at McGowan.

== See also ==
- Long Beach, Washington
- Ilwaco Railway and Navigation Company
- Astoria-Megler Ferry
- List of ghost towns in Washington
