= Leo O. Meigs =

American politician

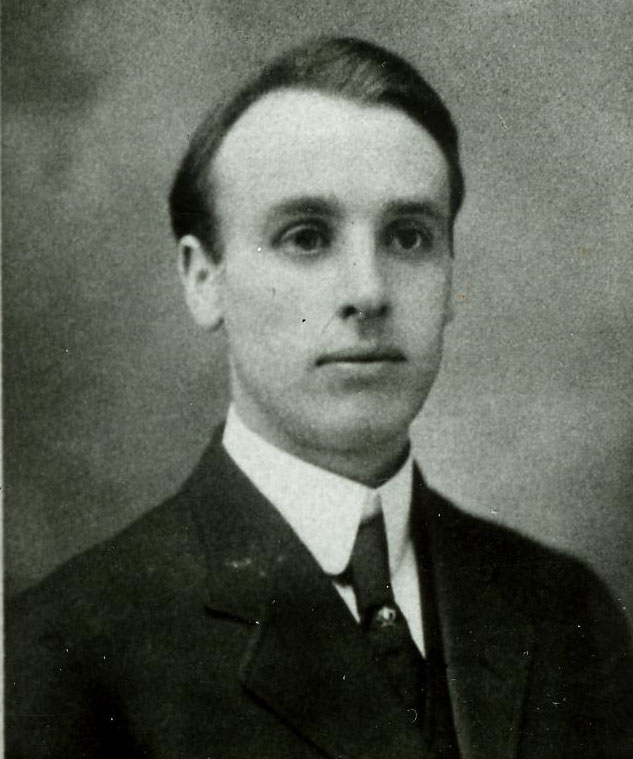
- Meigs in 1909

11th Speaker of the Washington House of Representatives
- In office January 11, 1909 – January 9, 1911
- Preceded by: Jacob Falconer
- Succeeded by: Howard D. Taylor

Member of the Washington House of Representatives for the 20th district
- In office 1909–1911

Personal details
- Born: April 28, 1879 Grand Manan Island, New Brunswick, Canada
- Died: July 30, 1923 (aged 44) Yakima, Washington, United States
- Party: Republican

Leonard Othello Meigs (April 28, 1879 – July 30, 1923) was an American politician in the state of Washington. He served in the Washington House of Representatives. From 1909 to 1911, he was the Speaker of that body.
