= Jacob Falconer =

5th Mayor of Everett

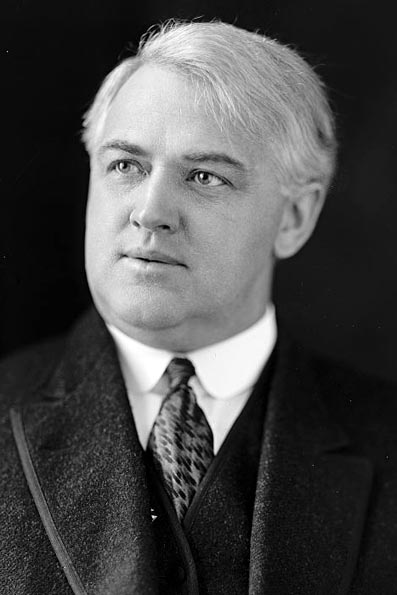

Member of the U.S. House of Representatives from Washington's At-large district
- In office March 4, 1913 – March 3, 1915
- Preceded by: Constituency established
- Succeeded by: Constituency abolished

10th Speaker of the Washington House of Representatives
- In office January 14, 1907 – January 11, 1909
- Preceded by: Joseph George Megler
- Succeeded by: Leo O. Meigs

Member of the Washington Senate from the 38th district
- In office January 11, 1909 – January 13, 1913
- Preceded by: T. B. Sumner
- Succeeded by: John E. Campbell

Member of the Washington House of Representatives from the 48th district
- In office January 9, 1905 – January 11, 1909
- Preceded by: Herchmer Johnston
- Succeeded by: John E. Campbell

5th Mayor of Everett, Washington
- In office January 1, 1897 – January 1, 1899
- Preceded by: William C. Cox
- Succeeded by: James O. Whitmarsh

Personal details
- Born: Jacob Alexander Falconer; January 26, 1869 Ontario, Canada
- Died: July 1, 1928 (aged 59) Wingdale, New York
- Resting place: Saugatuck Cemetery, Saugatuck, Michigan.
- Party: Progressive
- Spouse(s): Mabel (Thomson) Falconer (1869–1957)
- Children: Harold Falconer (1897–1980); Robert Falconer (1903–93); Marjorie Falconer (1907–09)
- Education: Beloit (WI) Academy, 1890; Beloit College (attended)
- Profession: Lumber, Construction, Oil

Jacob Alexander Falconer (January 26, 1869 – July 1, 1928) was a one-term congressman from the state of Washington, elected at-large in 1912.

== Early years ==
Born in Ontario, Canada, Falconer moved with his parents to Saugatuck, Michigan, in 1873. He attended the public schools, and moved to Washburn, Wisconsin Falconer graduated from Beloit (Wisconsin) Academy in 1890 and later took college work at Beloit College.

== Political career ==
He moved west in 1894 to Everett, Washington, and was in the lumber business and served as mayor of Everett in 1897 and 1898. Falconer was member of the state legislature (1904–1908), and was speaker of the house during the 1907 session. He served as member of the state senate from 1909 to 1912.

Falconer ran for Congress in one of two new at-large seats Progressive in 1912, as Washington's congressional apportionment grew from three to five seats following the 1910 census. He was elected to the Sixty-third Congress and served for one term (March 4, 1913 – March 3, 1915), and was an unsuccessful candidate for the nomination for U.S. Senator on the Progressive ticket in 1914. The nomination went to Ole Hanson, who finished third in a five-man general election and was elected mayor of Seattle in 1918.

== After politics ==
After leaving Washington, D.C., Falconer remained on the East Coast and worked in the ship-brokerage business in New York City from 1915 to 1919. He then moved to Fort Worth, Texas, in 1919 and engaged in road-construction contracting, then to Farmington, New Mexico, in 1925 and was in the oil and gas industry. Falconer died in Wingdale, New York, on July 1, 1928, and was interred in Saugatuck Cemetery in Saugatuck, Michigan.

== See also ==
- List of mayors of Everett, Washington
