= Hood Canal Bridge =

Pontoon bridge in western Washington State, United States

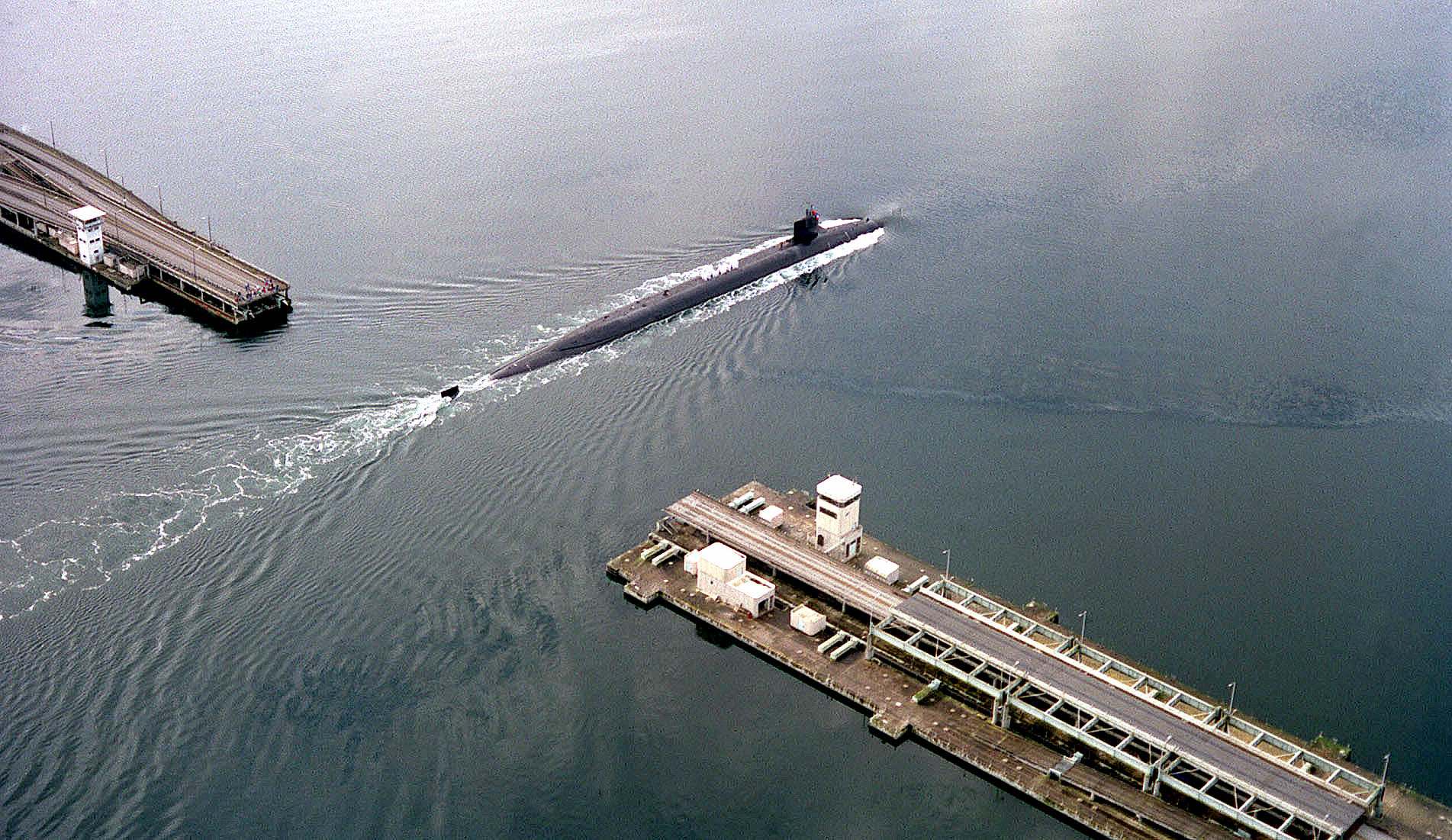
- USS Ohio (SSGN-726) maneuvers through the drawspan to her homeport in Bangor
- Coordinates: 47.86°N 122.625°W
- Carries: SR 104
- Crosses: Hood Canal of Puget Sound
- Locale: Kitsap and Jefferson counties, Washington, U.S.
- Official name: William A. Bugge Bridge
- Other name: Hood Canal Floating Bridge
- Maintained by: Washington State Department of Transportation

Characteristics
- Design: Pontoon bridge with retractable draw span
- Total length: 7,869 ft (1.49 mi; 2.40 km)
- Longest span: 600 ft (183 m) (drawspan)

History
- Construction start: January 1958
- Construction cost: $26.6 million
- Opened: August 12, 1961
- Rebuilt: 1979–1982; 2006–2009

Statistics
- Daily traffic: 13327 (2002)

Location
- Interactive map of Hood Canal Bridge

The Hood Canal Bridge (officially William A. Bugge Bridge) is a floating bridge in western Washington state, United States. It carries State Route 104 across Hood Canal in Puget Sound and connects the Olympic and Kitsap Peninsulas. At 7,869 feet (1.490 mi; 2.398 km) in length (floating portion 6,521 feet (1.235 mi; 1.988 km)), it is the longest floating bridge in the world located in a saltwater tidal basin, and the third longest floating bridge overall. It opened in 1961 and was the second concrete floating bridge constructed in Washington. Since that time, it has become a vital link for local residents, freight haulers, commuters, and recreational travelers. The convenience it provides has had a major impact on economic development, especially in eastern Jefferson County.

The bridge is officially named after William A. Bugge (1900–1992), the director of the Department of Highways from 1949 to 1963, who was a leader in the planning and construction of the bridge.

== History ==
=== Design, fabrication, and construction ===
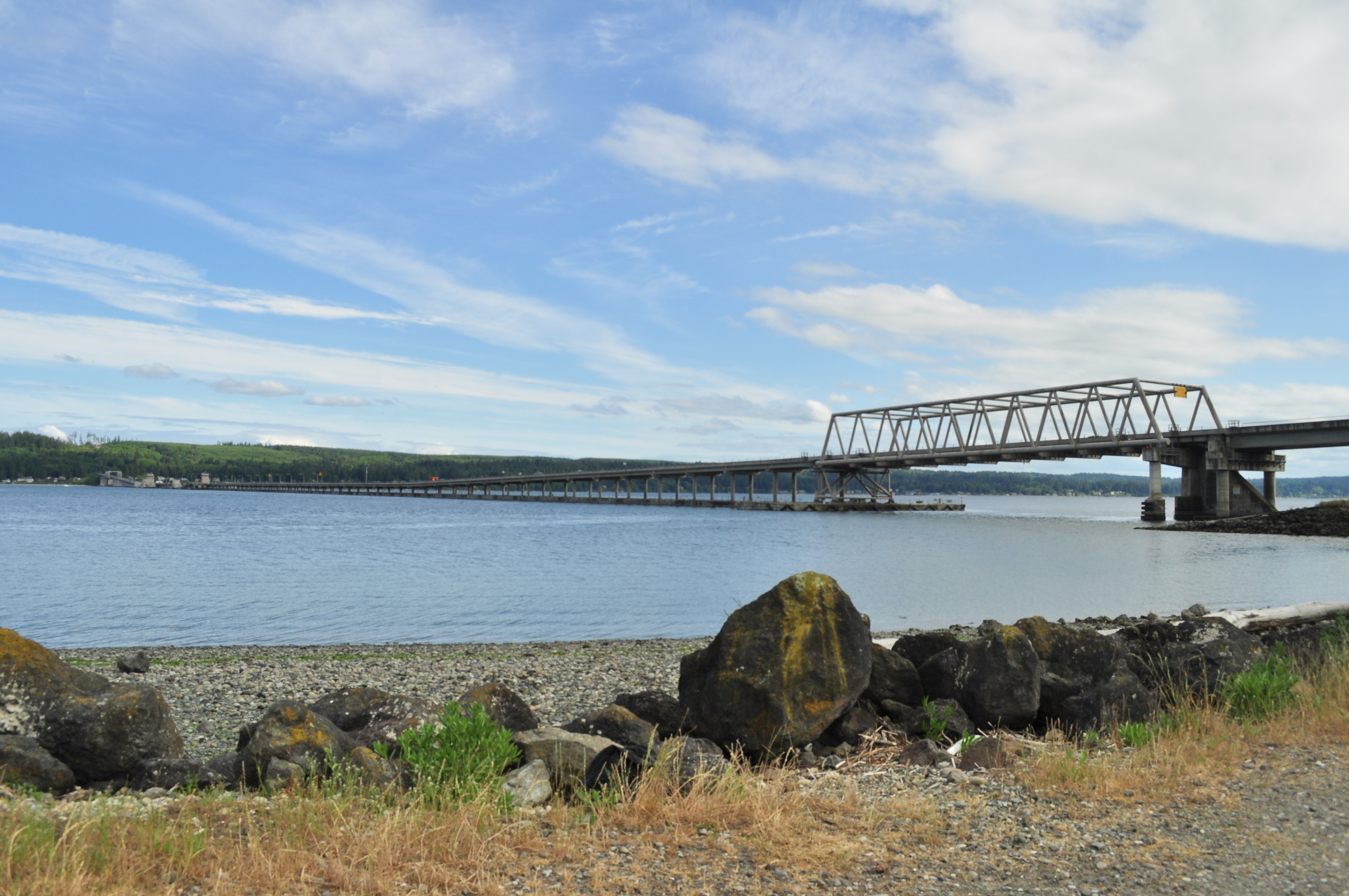
Seen from the north (Termination Point)

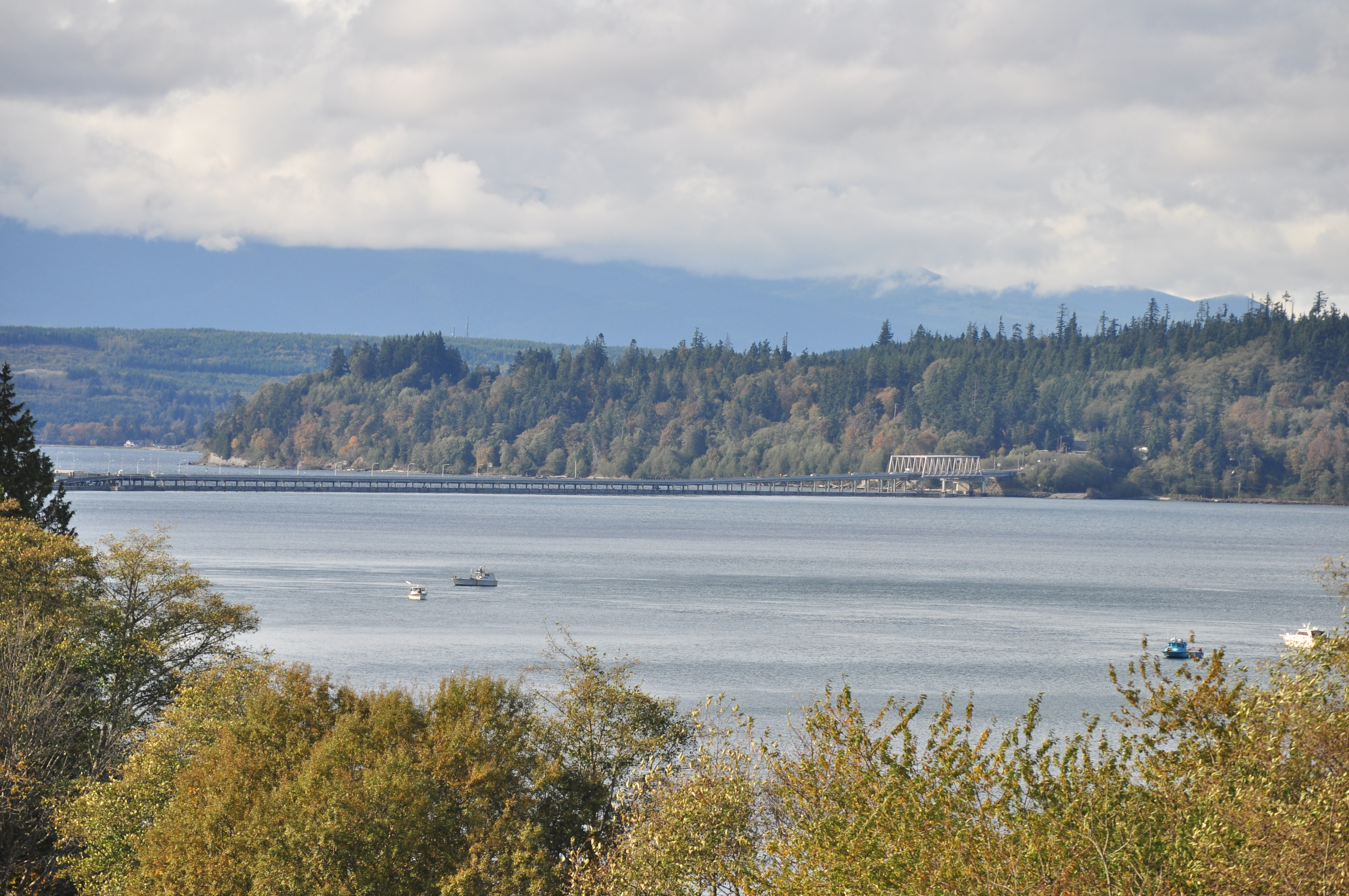
Hood Canal Bridge from Buena Vista Cemetery, Port Gamble, Washington.

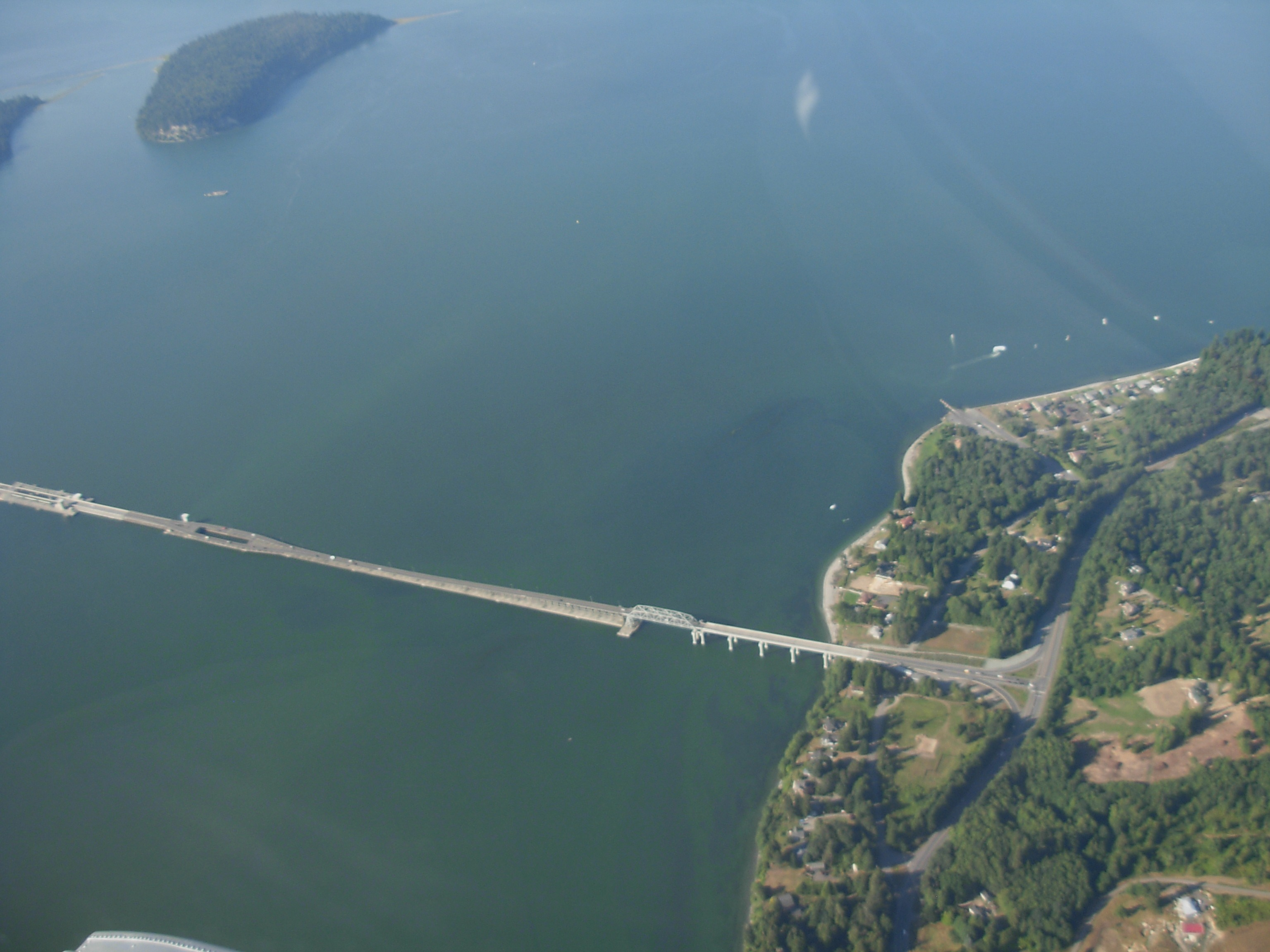
Aerial view of the bridge's southeast half, with drawspan section at far left

The design and planning process for the Hood Canal Bridge took nearly a decade amid criticism from some engineers throughout that time. Critics questioned the use of floating pontoons over salt water, especially at a location with high tide fluctuations and the concern that the funneling effect of Hood Canal might magnify the intensity of winds and tides. The depth of the water, however, made construction of support columns for other bridge types prohibitively expensive. The water depth below the pontoons ranges from 80 to 340 feet (25 to 105 m). In its marine environment, the bridge is exposed to tidal swings of 16.5 feet (5 m).

The pontoons for the bridge were fabricated in the Duwamish Waterway in Seattle; during fabrication, two of the pontoons sank. When they were attached for the first time, and then towed into place and anchored, sea conditions in Hood Canal were too severe and the pontoons were returned to a nearby bay until a better method of attaching could be devised. The structural engineers and the contractor decided the design was faulty. A new contractor was hired and the design modified. It was decided to use a large rubber dam between each of the two pontoons as they were attached, clean the concrete surfaces of all marine growth, epoxy, and tension them with a number of cables welded to a variety of attachment points. This system seemed to work from when the bridge opened in 1961 until the disaster of 1979.

The eastern approach span weighs more than 3,800 tons (3,400 tonnes) and the western approach span weighs more than 1,000 tons (907 tonnes)

In 1977, the bridge was officially named the William A. Bugge Hood Canal Bridge after the former Washington Director of Highways.

=== 1979 sinking and reconstruction ===
External videos
- From the Archives: Raw footage after Hood Canal Bridge sinking - February 13, 1979 via KIRO-TV on YouTube

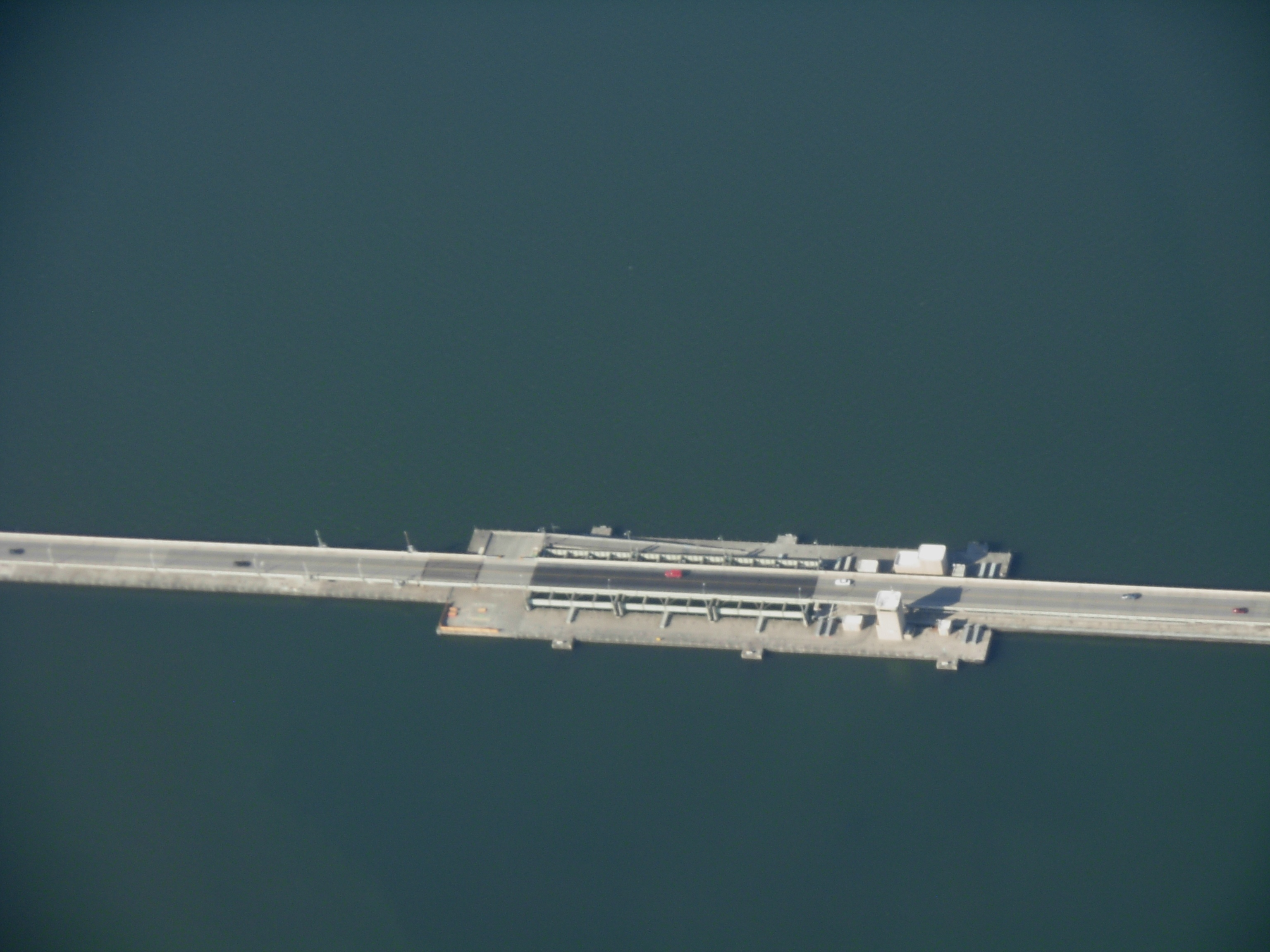
The base of the west draw span, after replacement in 1979–82. To open for marine traffic, the section in the center of the photo raises and the section at right retracts under it.

The Hood Canal Bridge suffered catastrophic failure in 1979 during the February 13 windstorm. During the night, the bridge had withstood sustained winds of up to 85 mph (137 km/h) and gusts estimated at 120 mph (190 km/h), and finally succumbed at about 7:30 a.m. on February 13. The western drawspan and the pontoons of the western half had broken loose and sunk, despite the drawspan being opened to relieve lateral pressure. At the time of the failure, the bridge had been closed to highway traffic and the tower crew had evacuated; no casualties resulted. Evidence points to blown-open hatches allowing flooding of the pontoons as the cause of the sinking.

Efforts to repair the bridge began immediately and Washington Secretary of Transportation William A. Bulley secured a commitment of federal emergency relief money for the project. On June 15, 1979, actual work began with the removal of the west truss and transport for storage. The state's department of transportation attempted to mitigate the impact of the disaster by redirecting traffic to U.S. Route 101 to drive around the 50-mile (80 km) length of Hood Canal and by reestablishing the state ferry run between Lofall and South Point across the canal just south of the bridge. This route had been discontinued after the 1961 bridge opening and the state needed to reacquire access to and restore operational conditions on both landings. During the course of the closure an additional ferry route was temporarily added between Edmonds and Port Townsend until February 1980, when it was replaced with additional Lofall–South Point runs.

The Hood Canal Bridge re-opened to vehicular traffic on October 24, 1982. The temporary ferries, which had carried 3,100 vehicles per day, were retired within several days. The west portion replacement had been designed and constructed in less than three years using $100 million in federal emergency bridge replacement funds at a total cost of $143 million (equivalent to $477 million today).

The bridge reopened as a toll bridge, but a court ruled in August 1985 that the insurance settlement constituted repayment of the construction bonds, and since federal funds were used in reconstructing the bridge, the Washington State Department of Transportation (WSDOT) could not charge tolls after the bonds were retired. WSDOT was ordered to stop collecting tolls on August 29.

=== Eastern span replacement ===
In a project that lasted from 2003 to 2009, WSDOT replaced the east-half floating portion of the bridge, the east and west approach spans, the east and west transition spans, and the west-half electrical system. The total cost of the project, about $471 million, was paid for by state, federal and agency funds. The project required the bridge to close to traffic for five weeks to allow the old pontoons of the east-half to be cut away and the new pontoons floated into position, cabled together and connected by cables to large anchors on the sea floor. The transition spans and center draw span were also replaced during this closure. The bridge was fully closed on May 1, 2009, and reopened on June 3; during the closure, temporary passenger ferries were operated across Hood Canal and a nightly Port Townsend–Edmonds route was added for freight vehicles.

The pontoons and anchors for the bridge could not be built at the bridge site due to space and facility limitations. WSDOT evaluated different sites at which to build during a site selection process. The Port Angeles graving dock was chosen for its accessibility to water and land as well as the work force. A review performed under the provisions of the National Historic Preservation Act found no evidence of historical properties at the site, which allowed WSDOT to purchase the site and begin construction. Within the first two weeks of construction, artifacts were found from an ancestral burial ground from an ancient village called Tse-whit-zen. WSDOT stopped all work on the site, and a consultation process began among the Lower Elwha Klallam Tribe, WSDOT, the Federal Highway Administration, the Army Corps of Engineers, and the State Historical Preservation Office. On August 14, 2006, WSDOT agreed to donate the site to the Lower Elwha Klallam tribe, rebury all remains uncovered, and pay $2.5 million in damages. It is believed that this discovery may be documentation of the first time that indigenous and non-indigenous peoples began to interact on this shore. These historical findings will be investigated thoroughly by the Lower Elwha Klallam Tribe and archaeologists.

On December 21, 2004, Governor Locke and Secretary MacDonald announced that WSDOT would stop pontoon and anchor construction at the Tse-whit-zen site in Port Angeles and begin searching for a more suitable place to build. Many sites were considered but the best option to be found by WSDOT was in Tacoma, where construction began on the new east-half floating pontoons in April 2006. Fourteen pontoons were built in four cycles at the site. Completed pontoons were floated out of the graving dock in Tacoma and transported to Seattle for outfitting at Todd Shipyards. Outfitting included adding all electrical and mechanical parts, connecting the pontoons into sections, and building the roadway on top of the pontoons. Another three pontoons, built during the west-half bridge replacement in the early 1980s, were retrofitted in Seattle.

== Use ==
In planning for a prolonged closure of the bridge for the east-half replacement, the Washington State Department of Transportation conducted a five-day survey of bridge use in early June 1998 in order to assess closure impact and plan effective mitigation strategies. The survey was in three stages: A video camera count of traffic on weekdays (Tuesday and Wednesday) and a weekend (Friday through Sunday) to estimate average volume; the use of that video to record license plate numbers for vehicle registration addresses to assess which communities would be most affected; and the mailing of a questionnaire to the registered owners of those vehicles seeking information on trip origin, destination, and purpose, and choice of travel alternatives during a bridge closure.

The video count produced a weekday average of 14,915 trips/day and a weekend average of 18,759 trips/day. Peak volumes reach 20,000 vehicles on summer weekends. The vehicle registration information indicated that a majority of trips were by residents of communities near the bridge. The most represented communities were, in numerical order, Port Ludlow (8%), Port Townsend (7%), Port Angeles (6%), Seattle (6%), Sequim (5%), Poulsbo (5%), Bremerton (4%), Port Hadlock (2%), and Silverdale (2%).

The questionnaires revealed that a majority of trips were to and/or from communities near the bridge. On the weekend 48% of westbound trips originated on the north and central Kitsap Peninsula, with 88% of the destinations in areas near Port Ludlow, Port Townsend, Sequim, and Port Angeles. For weekday trips, nearly 55% of westbound trips originated in northern or central Kitsap County with 90% of the destinations in the Port Ludlow, Port Townsend, Sequim, and Port Angeles areas. A large number of eastbound weekday morning trips appeared to be for commuting purposes, with 92% of those trips originating in Port Ludlow, Port Townsend, Sequim, or Port Angeles, and 60% with central or northern Kitsap County as a destination, and 32% ending in the Seattle metropolitan area. The evening westbound trips seemed to mirror the morning patterns. When asked the purpose of their trips, respondents reported that for weekend trips 21% were for recreational, 21% for social, 19% for personal, 18% for work, 6% for business, and 4% for medical reasons. For weekday trips 33% were for work, 17% for personal, 14% for business, 11% for medical, 9% for social, and 8% for recreational reasons.

== Sources ==
- Burows, Alyssa. "Bulley, William A. (b. 1925)" in the HistoryLink.org Cyberpedia Library, Essay 7289. March 28, 2005 (retrieved July 24, 2006).
- Burows, Alyssa. "William Adair Bugge assumes duties as Director of Highways on July 1, 1949" in the HistoryLink.org Timeline Library, Essay 7256. March 5, 2005 (retrieved July 24, 2006).
- Hood Canal Bridge East-Half Replacement Closure Mitigation Plan – Preferred Options. Washington State Department of Transportation and Bucher, Willis & Ratliff Corporation. February 2000.
- Hood Canal Bridge – A Floating Lift Draw Bridge. Michael J. Abrahams, Parsons Brinckerhoff Quade and Douglass, Inc. 1982. Heavy Movable Structures Symposium
