= Berkach (Grabfeld) =

Coordinates: 50°25′N 10°24′E

Berkach is a former municipality in the district Schmalkalden-Meiningen, in Thuringia, Germany. It has been a part of Grabfeld since December 1, 2007.
