= Howard D. Taylor =

American politician

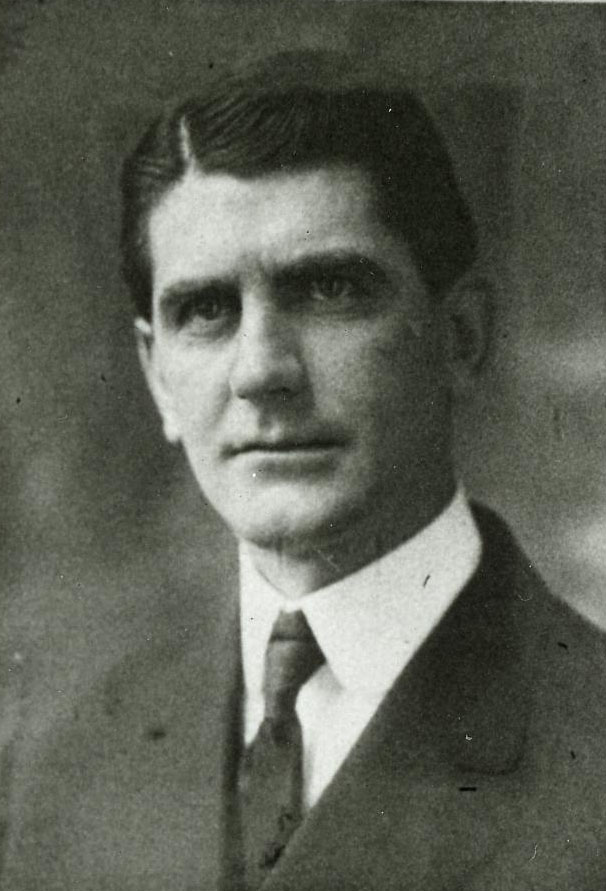
- Taylor in 1913

President pro tempore of the Washington Senate
- In office February 2, 1919 – January 8, 1923
- Preceded by: Phillip H. Carlyon
- Succeeded by: Phillip H. Carlyon

12th Speaker of the Washington House of Representatives
- In office January 9, 1911 – January 11, 1915
- Preceded by: Leo O. Meigs
- Succeeded by: W. W. Conner

Member of the Washington House of Representatives for the 40th district
- In office 1907–1915

Member of the Washington State Senate for the 30th district
- In office 1915–1923

Personal details
- Born: March 8, 1878 Independence, Iowa, United States
- Died: September 14, 1944 (aged 66) Seattle, Washington, United States
- Party: Republican

Howard Dickson Taylor (March 8, 1878 – September 14, 1944) was an American politician in the state of Washington. He served in the Washington House of Representatives and Washington State Senate. From 1911 to 1915, he was Speaker of the Washington House.
