= Megler, Washington =

Unincorporated community in Washington, United States

- Unincorporated community
- Location within Washington (state) Location within the United States
- Country: United States
- State: Washington
- County: Pacific
- Elevation: 20 ft (6.1 m)
- Time zone: UTC-8 (Pacific (PST))
  - Summer (DST): UTC-7 (PDT)
- GNIS feature ID: 1511142

Megler is a small unincorporated community in Pacific County in the U.S. state of Washington. Named for legislator Joseph G. Megler, the community is at the mouth of the Columbia River on the north shore (Washington side) of the river. It is the northern end of the Astoria-Megler Bridge, which connects Megler to Astoria, Oregon, a nearby city on the south shore (Oregon side) of the river. U.S. Route 101 and State Route 401 intersect in the community and connect Megler to Aberdeen, Olympia, and Vancouver.

== History ==
From 1921 to 1966, a ferry route across the Columbia River connected with docks near Megler.
