= Astoria–Megler ferry =

Defunct ferry route between Oregon and Washington

- Tourist II
- Waterway: Columbia River
- Route: Astoria, Oregon – Megler, Washington
- Authority: Private (1922–1946); Oregon Highway Dept. (1946–1966).
- Began operation: 1921
- Ended operation: 1966
- Successor: Astoria–Megler Bridge
- Travel time: 30 minutes in good weather
- Connections at Astoria
- Road: U.S. Route 101
- Connections at Megler
- Road: U.S. Route 101

The Astoria–Megler ferry, also called the Astoria–McGowan ferry and the Astoria–North Beach ferry, ran across the Columbia River between Astoria, Oregon, and two ferry docks near the present small community of Megler, Washington, from 1921 to 1966.

== History ==
Until 1920, the Long Beach Peninsula in Pacific County, Washington, also known as the North Beach, was an isolated portion of the state because of the lack of roads. It was practically impossible to reach except by water transport, generally a steamboat. The two most important steamboat landings on the peninsula were on the Columbia River, at Ilwaco and, 15 miles (24 km) to the north, on Willapa Bay (then known as Shoalwater Bay), at Nahcotta. In 1889, a narrow gauge railway, the Ilwaco Railway and Navigation Company, connected the two points, running out on the docks at each terminus. During the summers, always the busiest season, steamers such as the sidewheeler T. J. Potter brought vacation crowds from Portland, Oregon, down the Columbia River to the landing at Ilwaco, and after 1908 to a much larger dock further upriver at Megler. The railroad and steamers, both under the control of the Union Pacific Railroad, reached their highest point of profitability in the summer of 1913.

In 1916, construction was completed on a paved highway running from Portland to Astoria. Demand for steamer travel fell off. The last steamer to make the Portland to Astoria run was the sternwheeler Harvest Queen, on February 18, 1921. The steamer Nahcotta made runs from Astoria to Megler, but could not compete with the auto ferries that were coming on the route.

== Ferry service ==
Ferry service across the Columbia River from Astoria, Oregon, to Megler, Washington, began in the summer of 1920 when Capt. Fritz S. Elfving set up a scow as an improvised ferry and transported over 700 vehicles during that summer. In April 1921, Elfving incorporated as the Astoria-McGowan Ferry Company. With the company capitalized at $30,000, Elfving was also able to secure a subsidy of $400 per year from Pacific County, Washington. The county also built a road from the town of Chinook to McGowan, Washington, where the company had arranged to build a ferry slip at the end of a dock owned by a cannery, P.J. McGowan & Co. Elving also persuaded the Astoria City Council to use municipal funds to construct a ferry dock on the Oregon side of the river.

Elfving then contracted with an Astoria shipbuilding firm to build a diesel motor ferry, at a price of between $17,000 and $22,000. The new vessel, Tourist III (60 ft (18.29 m) 15 tons, capacity 15 automobiles, 30 passengers) was launched on May 21, 1921, and entered service a few days later. Now with the ferry in place, travellers could drive their automobiles all the way to Astoria and onto a ferry to take them over to the Long Beach Peninsula, without the need of either railroad or steamboat.

Ferry traffic quickly rose, and Elfving commissioned a new and larger wooden-hulled ferry, Tourist II (98 ft (29.87 m), 95 tons, capacity: 22 automobiles, 155 passengers), which was launched at Astoria on June 17, 1924. The ferries departed from a specially-built dock at 14th Street in Astoria which included a ramp to allow rapid loading and unloading of automobiles.

In good weather the ferry trip took about 30 minutes. In 1925, motor truck operators in Astoria started using the ferries to the Long Beach Peninsula which cut sharply into the railroad's freight business.

== Competition ==
Ferry North Beach

In 1926, the Union Pacific Railroad tried to best the Elfving company by building their own automobile ferry, the North Beach (120 ft (36.58 m) 225 tons, capacity 25 automobiles). Union Pacific had ferry slips built at Astoria and at Megler. Although the North Beach was a well-built vessel, launched on April 28, 1927, with fanfare, and making its first run on July 6, 1927, North Beach could never manage to compete with Captain Elfving's boats. J.W. McGowan, a businessman of McGowan, owned stock in Elfving's ferry company, and he made it difficult for the railroad to build a road over his property to the Union Pacific's competing ferry dock at Megler. Union Pacific shut down ferry operations to Megler in September 1930 selling to one of its employees, Capt. Calvin E. Stewart, claiming they'd lost $40,000 per year in the ferry business.

The railroad calculated that the line had suffered losses of $300,000 from 1925 to 1928. Apparently the railroad then hit on the idea of forming a new subsidiary, the Astoria, North Shore and Willapa Harbor Railroad, selling stock in the railroad to local residents, and then using the proceeds from the stock sale to buy out its losing operation. Supposedly the new operation would return the route to profitability by operating cheaper small diesel-electric engines and cut its expenses by 90%. The plan also included a new ferry for motor traffic and use of trucks instead of rail to deliver freight. There were some problems with the legality of the stock proposal, as the sale could not proceed without the approval of the Interstate Commerce Commission. Local opposition was high, and the plan eventually came to nothing.

In the spring of 1931, Stewart incorporated as the Columbia Transportation Company, and began a plan to put his rival, Captain Elfving, out of business. He began quietly buying up underwater parcels of real estate all around the Elfving ferry dock, and then one night with a hired marine pile driver drove in pilings around the dock so that a ferry could not get through. This move, which had been contemplated by Union Pacific as early as 1927 but not acted upon, did not stop Elving from landing his ferry, precisely how is not recorded but a story was repeated that Elving had backed up the ferry then surged ahead at full speed, knocking down the piles. Fighting between the two crews broke out on the dock until the Astoria police arrived. Elfving himself was a tough competitor. He was reported to have simply gotten in a car that was being driven over to the competitor's dock, and persuaded the driver to use his ferry instead. The dispute went on until 1932 when Elfving was able to buy out Stewart, who was having general difficulties in the hard economic times, and combine the two companies. Following the purchase, Elfving relocated all ferry landings on the north side to Megler, which was a better location for a landing than at McGowan.

== Depression and war ==
As of April 18, 1931, the route, under the name of the Astoria-North Beach Ferry Company charged a "new low rate" of $1 for car and driver. Ferries departed Astoria for Point Ellice, as the northern terminal was known, and returned, nine times a day. Walk-on passengers on the 9:00 a.m., 12:15 p.m., and 5:00 p.m. ferries out of Astoria could make a bus connection on arrival at Point Ellice, with the converse being true at Astoria for the 9:30 a.m., 12:45 p.m., and 5:30 pm ferries departing Point Ellice.

Construction of an additional motor ferry, the wooden-hulled Tourist III (109 ft (33.22 m) long, 233 tons, capacity: 28 automobiles, 280 passengers) was completed in 1931, with the new ferry entering service on July 4, 1931.

During the Second World War, Elfving sold Tourist II to the U.S. Army for $35,000. The Army renamed the ferry Octopus, rebuilt the ferry's upper works, and used it for mining laying and logistics. After the war Elfving bought Tourist II back from the Army, paying a little more, $36,000, but the Army had installed a new engine in the vessel.

== Sale to Oregon Highway Department ==
Captain Elfving retired in 1946 and sold his ferry business to Merle R. Chessman (d.1946), who had planned to sell the operation to the Oregon State Highway Department. This sale occurred on June 1, 1946, but Chessman died before the sale was completed.

In December 1947, a new ferry was launched and, in 1948, placed on the route. This was the steel-built M.R. Chessman (172 ft (52.43 m) 570 tons). Chessman remained on the route until the mid-1960s. Another vessel placed on the route was the motor ferry Kitsap (159 ft (48.46 m) 426 tons, capacity: 95 automobiles (1920s) 32 (1960), 325 passengers. The highway department also took over operation of Tourist II, and modified the vessel by shortening the superstructure and installing radar equipment.

== Close of service ==
The Astoria–Megler Bridge was completed on July 29, 1966, which replaced the need for the three-boat ferry service. The final run, made by the M.R. Chessman, departed from Astoria the night before at 9:40 p.m. with 14 vehicles and 300 passengers.

== Sale of the boats ==
The ferries were sold at auction on August 12, 1966. The U.S. Navy bought M.R. Chessman for $300,000, and transferred the vessel to Vietnam. The Navy had originally intended to use the vessel as a ferry on the Mekong River. The vessel was employed as a machine shop for river patrol craft.

Kitsap was sold to an Alaska purchaser for $12,250, who had the objective of using the vessel as a floating general store. Kitsap however was wrecked en route to Alaska.

Although Tourist II was over 40 years old, the ferry was still in excellent condition, Pierce County bought Tourist II, renamed the vessel Islander, carried out extensive modifications, and placed the ferry on the Steilacoom-Anderson Island route. In 1996, the ferry was purchased by Argosy Cruises, who refurbished the ferry and renamed it the MV Kirkland. The exterior styling, deck plan, and interior general arrangement were created by superyacht designer Jonathan Quinn Barnett of Seattle. The ferry sailed on Lake Washington as a tour boat until its engine was damaged by a fire on August 28, 2010. Argosy decided that repairs to the ferry would be too expensive and they decided to scrap the Kirkland.

The ferry was then purchased by Christian Lint, who found that the fire had done only minor damage to the boat. He made repairs and modifications, docked it at the Bremerton, Washington, marina, and marketed the boat as an event space. In the summer of 2015, while negotiating with a nonprofit group in Astoria, Oregon, to "bring her home" to its original ferry dock at the 14th Street Landing, Lint had the ferry legally renamed The Tourist No. 2. As of November 2015, Lint and the group are awaiting space at a shipyard in Seattle, where the ferry would be hauled out and inspected by the Coast Guard. If required repairs are minor, the nonprofit group, called the Astoria Ferry, will purchase the boat, make above-the-waterline repairs, and bring the boat to Astoria, where it would be used for Columbia River excursions and dockside events.

Tourist III was sold to the Pacific Pearl Company which modified the vessel to become a floating fish cannery.
