= Astoria–Megler Bridge =

Bridge in Oregon and Washington, U.S.

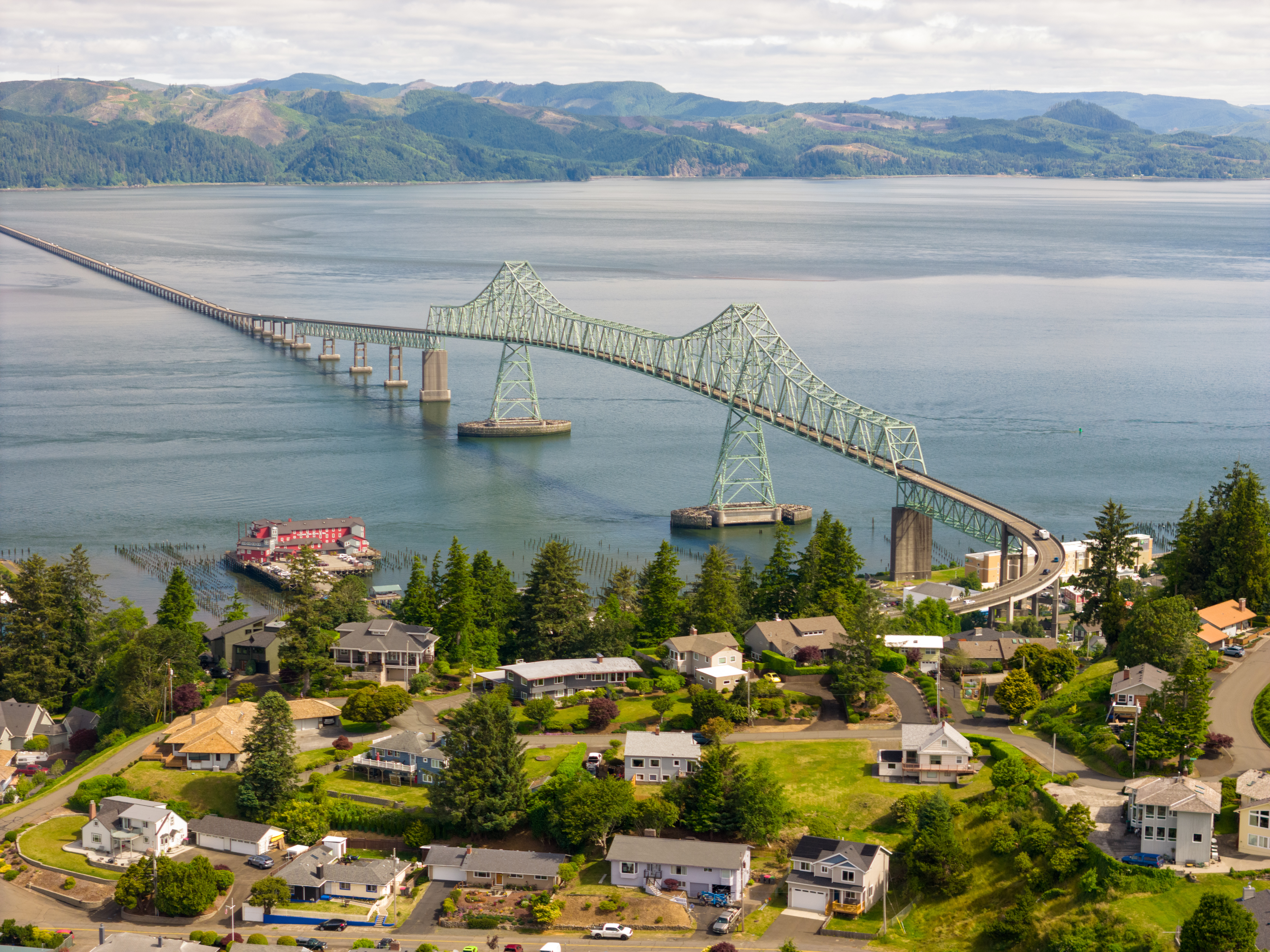
- Viewed from the Astoria side of the Columbia River
- Coordinates: 46.217°N 123.863°W
- Carries: 2 lanes of US 101 and bicycles
- Crosses: Columbia River
- Locale: Astoria, Oregon / Pacific County, Washington, U.S.
- Maintained by: Oregon Department of Transportation
- ID number: s0000548

Characteristics
- Design: cantilever through-truss
- Material: Steel
- Total length: 21,474 feet (6,545 m)
- Width: 28 feet (8.5 m)
- Longest span: 1,233 feet (376 m)
- No. of spans: 8 (main); 33 (approach)
- Piers in water: 171
- Clearance below: 196 feet (60 m) at high tide

History
- Designer: Oregon and Washington transportation departments
- Construction start: November 5, 1962; 63 years ago
- Construction end: August 27, 1966; 59 years ago
- Construction cost: $24 million (equivalent to $177 million in 2024 dollars)
- Opened: July 29, 1966; 60 years ago
- Inaugurated: August 27, 1966; 59 years ago
- Replaces: Astoria–Megler Ferry

Statistics
- Daily traffic: 7100
- Toll: none (since December 1993)

Location
- Interactive map of Astoria–Megler Bridge

The Astoria–Megler Bridge is a steel cantilever through-truss bridge in the Pacific Northwest region of the United States that spans the lower Columbia River. It carries a section of U.S. Route 101 from Astoria, Oregon, to Point Ellice near Megler, Washington. Opened in 1966, it is the longest continuous truss bridge in North America, and the second-longest in the world.

Lying 14 miles (23 km) from the river mouth at the Pacific Ocean, the bridge is four miles (6.5 km) in length, and was the final segment of U.S. Route 101 to be completed between Olympia, Washington, and Los Angeles, California.

== History ==
Tourist No. 2, a ferry built in 1924, replaced by Tourist III in 1931

Ferry service between Astoria and the Washington side of the Columbia River began in 1926. The Oregon Department of Transportation purchased the ferry service in 1946. This ferry service did not operate during inclement weather and the half-hour travel time caused delays. In order to allow faster and more reliable crossings near the mouth of the river, a bridge was planned. The bridge was built jointly by the Oregon Department of Transportation and Washington State Department of Transportation. Following construction, the Oregon Department of Transportation became the lead agency responsible for maintenance and operating the structure.

Construction on the structure began on November 5, 1962, and the concrete piers were cast at Tongue Point, four miles (6.5 km) upriver. The steel structure was built in segments at Vancouver, Washington, ninety miles (140 km) upriver, then barged downstream where hydraulic jacks lifted them into place. The bridge opened to traffic on July 29, 1966, marking the completion of U.S. Route 101 and becoming the seventh major bridge built by Oregon in the 1950s–1960s; ferry service ended the night before. On August 27, 1966, Governors Mark Hatfield of Oregon and Dan Evans of Washington dedicated the bridge by cutting a ceremonial ribbon. The four-day ceremony was celebrated by 30,000 attendees who participated in parades, drives, and a marathon boat race from Portland to Astoria. The cost of the project was $24 million, equivalent to $177 million in 2024 dollars, and was paid for by tolls that were removed on December 24, 1993, more than two years early.

Repainting the bridge was planned for May 2009 through 2011 and budgeted at $20 million, to be shared by the states of Oregon and Washington. A four-year planned paint stripping and repainting project was planned for March 2012 through December 2016.

In 2016, a colony of double-crested cormorants moved from nearby East Sand Island to the bridge, where they began nesting. Their presence caused issues with bridge inspections, as bird droppings and guano covered visual cracks, and nests obscured navigational lights used by ship traffic. The population of cormorants increased to 5,000 breeding pairs in 2020, prompting efforts by the Army Corps of Engineers to scare the birds from the bridge and relocate them back to East Sand Island.

== Details ==
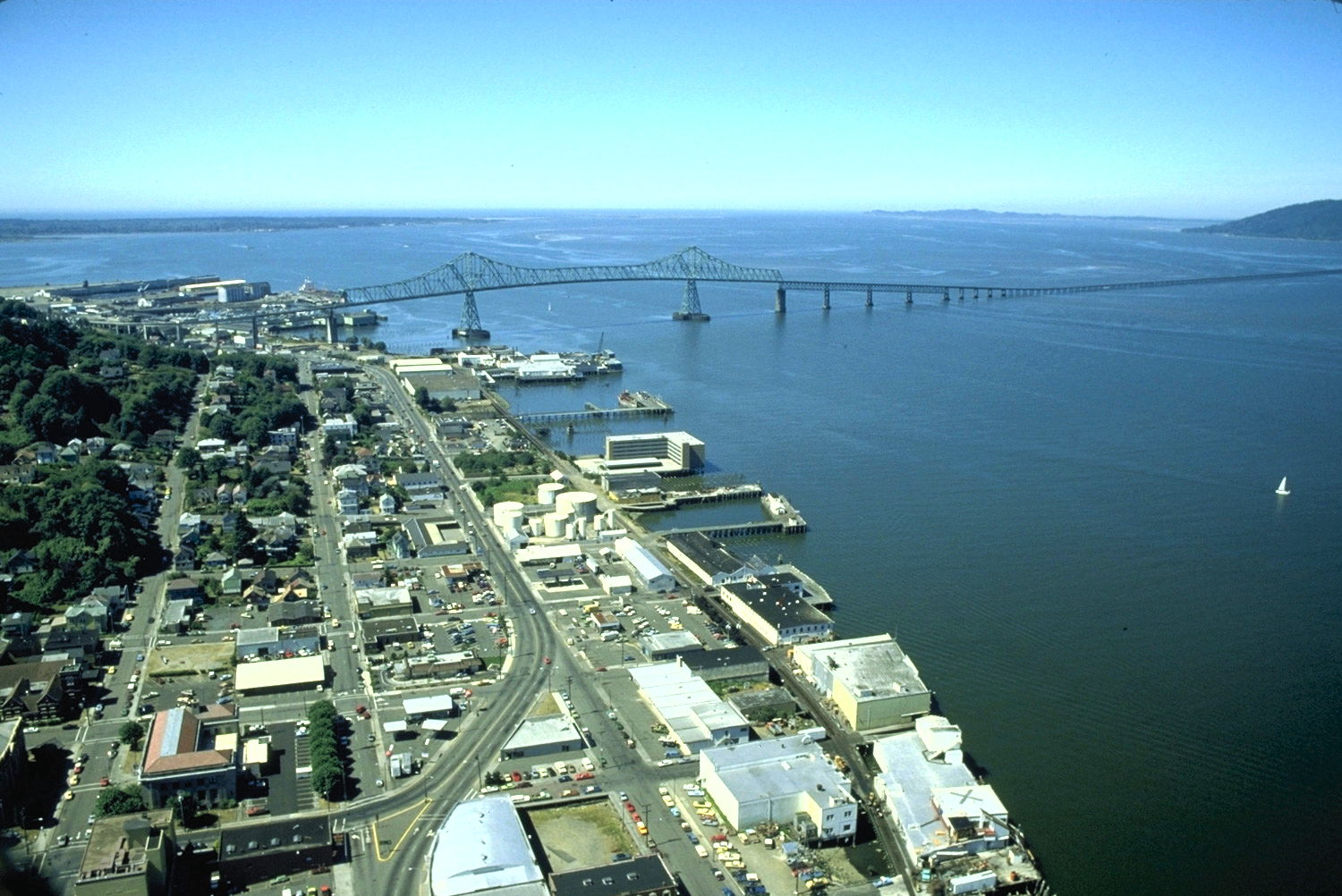
Looking west over Astoria in 1986

The bridge is 21,474 feet (4 mi; 6,545 m) in length and carries one lane of traffic in each direction. The elevated section, which is closest to the Oregon side and composed of three spans, is 2,468 feet (752 m) long, with the cantilevered central main span measuring 1,233 feet (376 m). It was built to withstand 150 mph (240 km/h) wind gusts and river water speeds of 9 mph (14 km/h). As of 2004, an average of 7,100 vehicles per day crossed the bridge. Designed by William Adair Bugge (1900–1992), construction of the cantilever truss bridge was completed by the DeLong Corporation, the American Bridge Company, and Pomeroy Gerwick.

The south end has the former toll plaza, at the end of a 2,130-foot (650 m) inclined ramp which forms a spiral bridge, going through a full 360-degree loop while gaining elevation over land to provide almost 200 feet (61 m) of clearance over the shipping channel (similarly to the Lincoln Tunnel Helix in Weehawken, New Jersey). The north end is an at-grade intersection with State Route 401. Since most of the northern portion of the bridge is over shallow, non-navigable water, it is low to the water.

== Pedestrians ==
Normally, pedestrians are prohibited on the bridge—only motor vehicles and bicycles are allowed. There is no sidewalk and the shoulders are too narrow for pedestrians adjacent to 55-mile-per-hour (89 km/h) traffic. However, one day a year—usually in October—the bridge is host to the Great Columbia Crossing. Participants are taken by shuttle to the Washington side, from where they run or walk to the Oregon side on a six-mile (9.7 km) route across the bridge. Motor traffic is allowed to use only one lane (of two lanes) and is advised to expect delays during the two-hour event. For the first time, during the 2018 event, the Oregon Department of Transportation announced that the bridge would be closed to motor traffic.

== Popular culture ==
The bridge itself is featured prominently in the movies Short Circuit, Kindergarten Cop, Free Willy 2: The Adventure Home, The Goonies, and Sometimes I Think About Dying. It stands in for the doomed fictional Madison Bridge in Irwin Allen's 1979 made-for-TV disaster movie The Night the Bridge Fell Down.

== Images ==
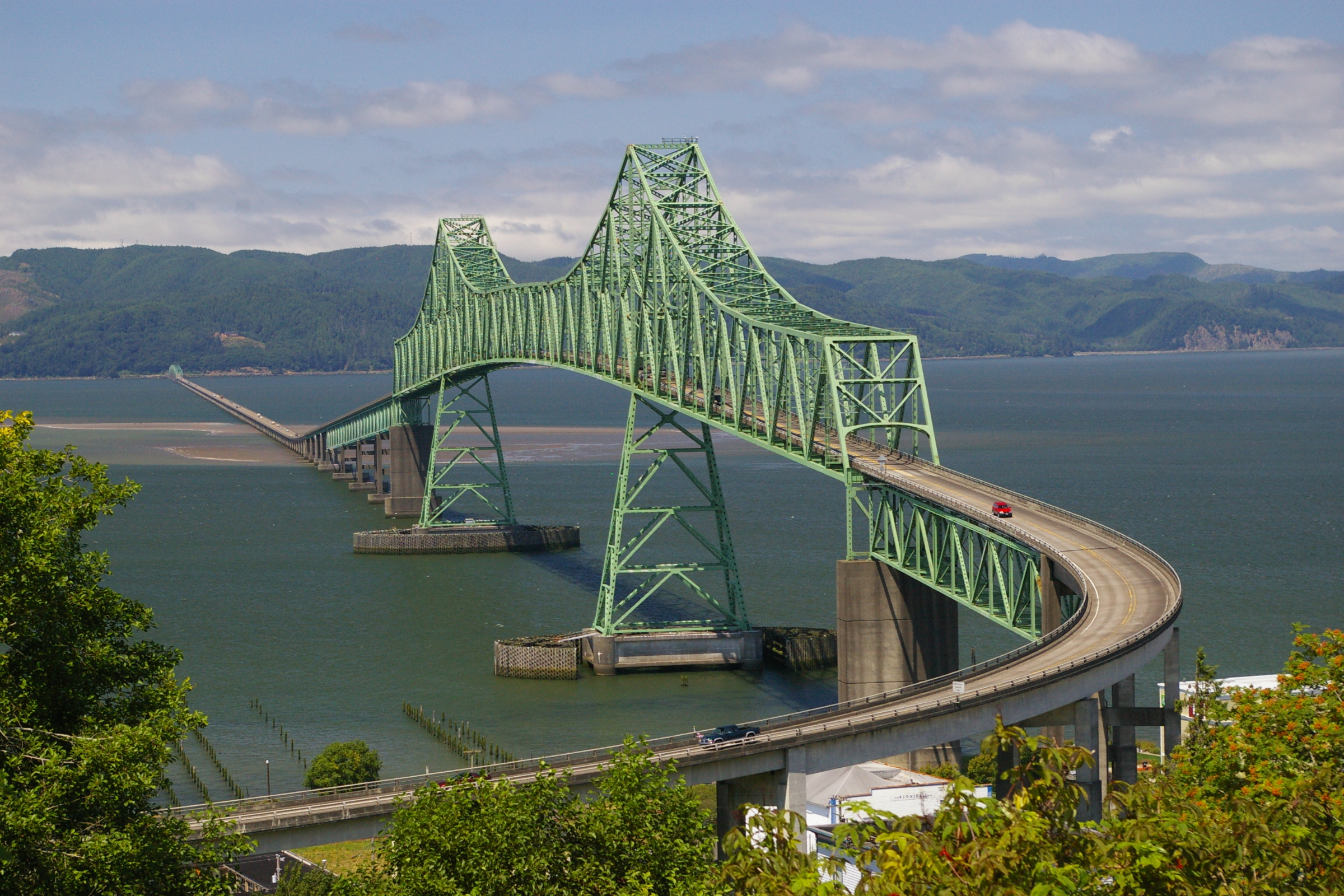
View of the bridge from Astoria neighborhood

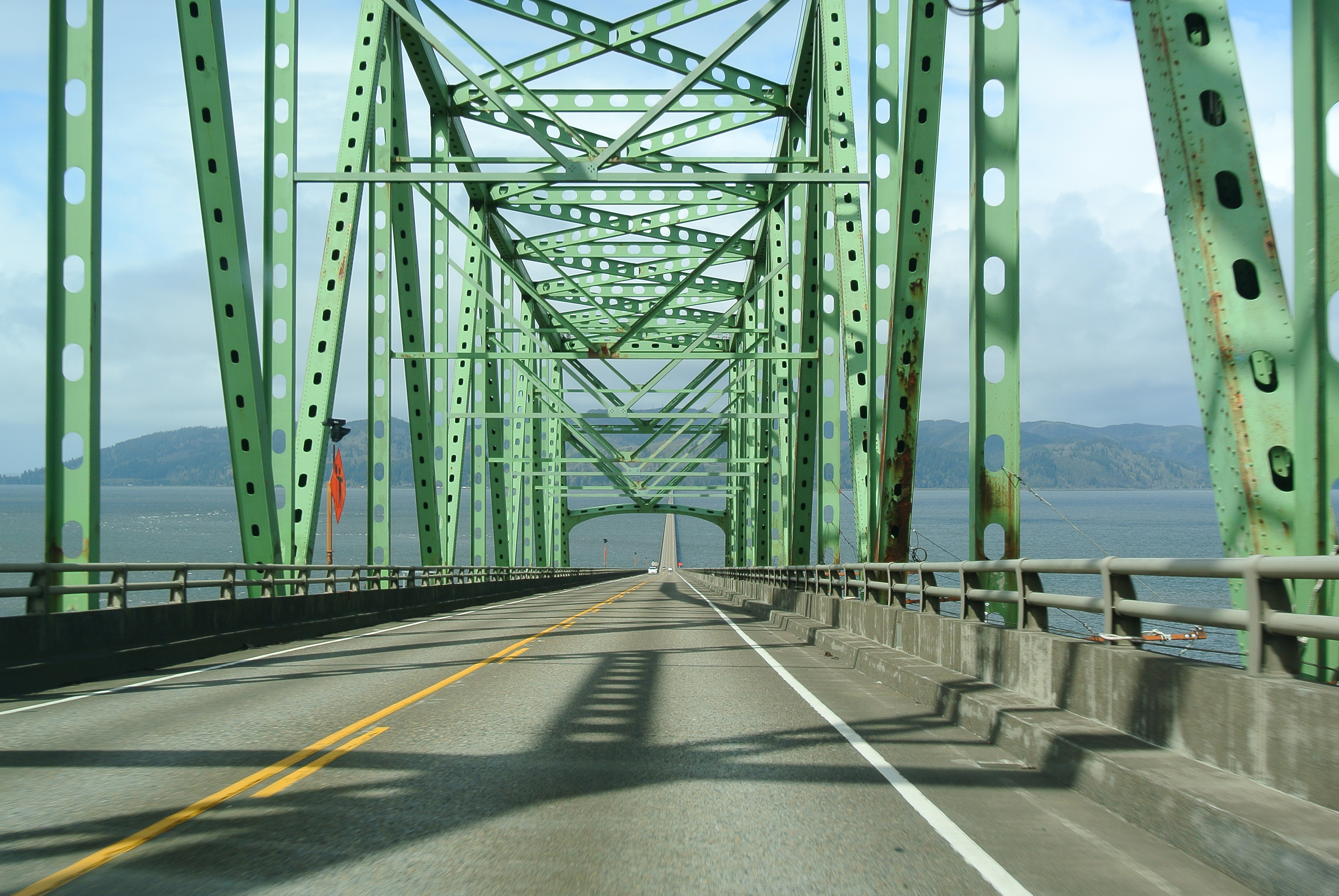
On the bridge, heading north

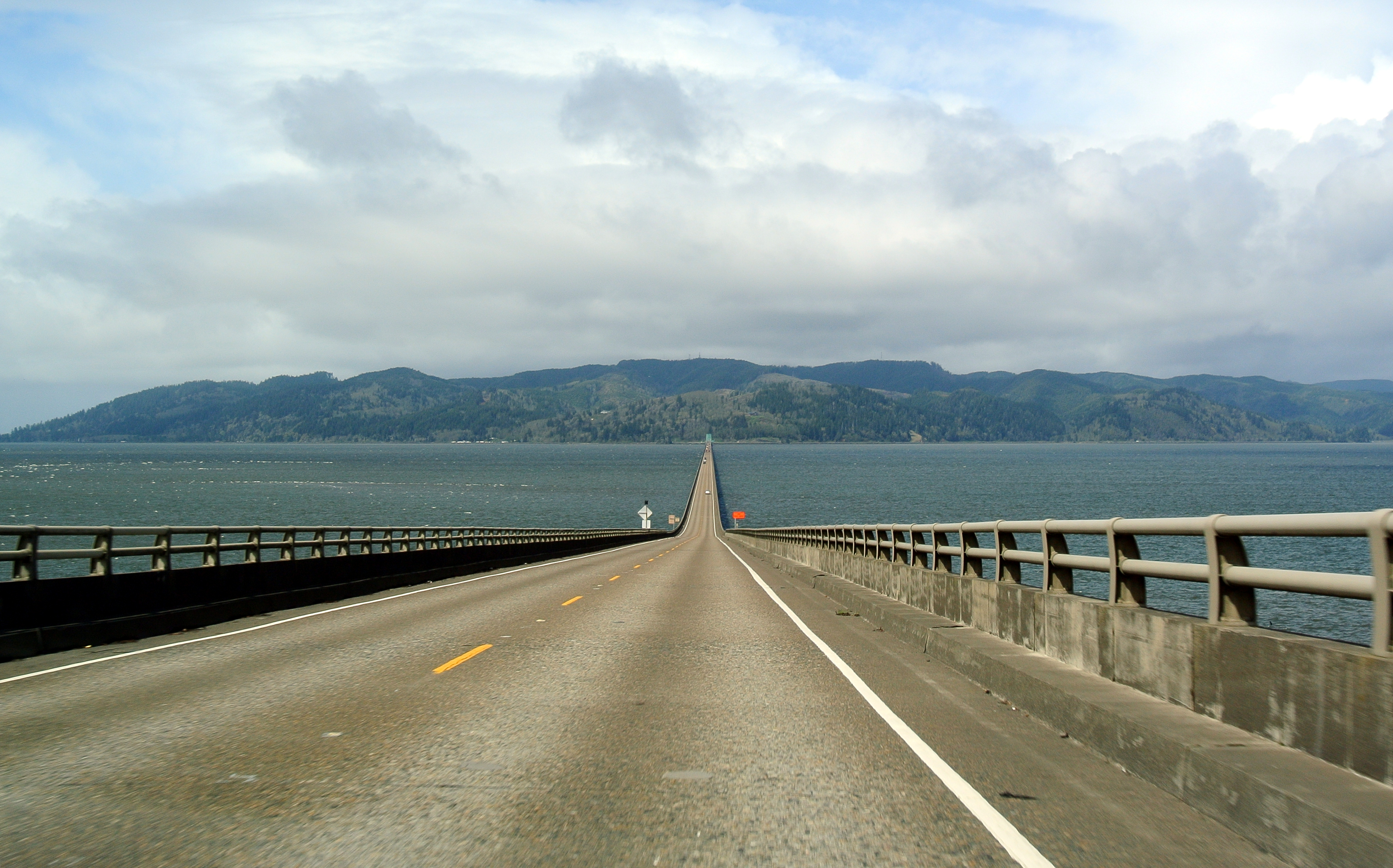
On the bridge, heading north

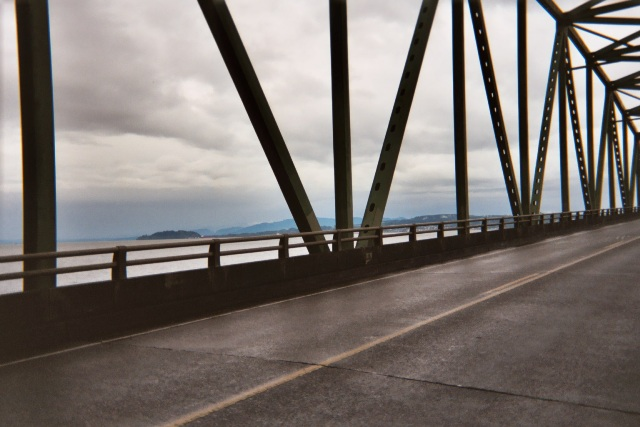
Astoria Bridge. Close up view of the through-truss section of the bridge

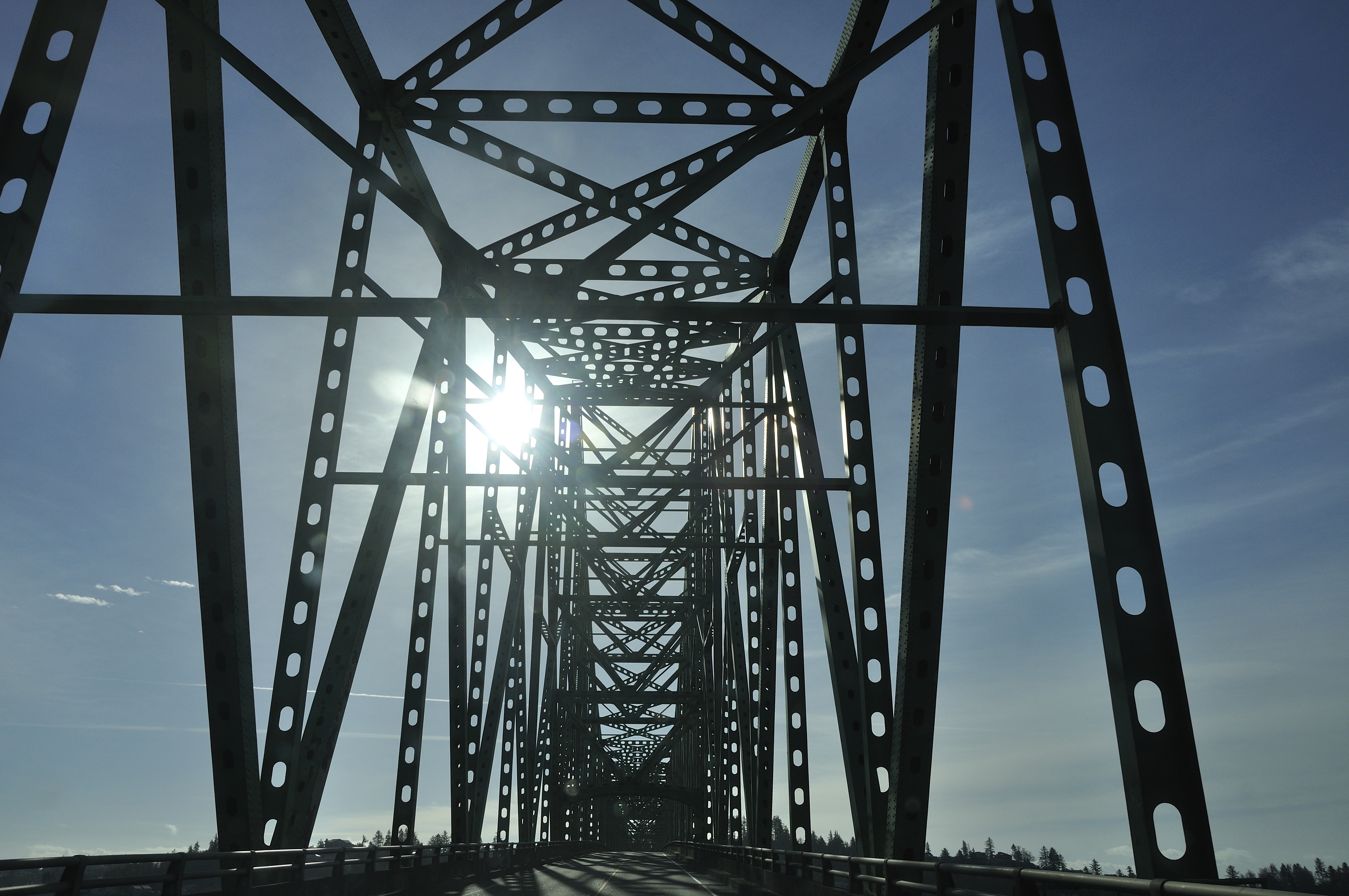
A close up view of the through-truss section of the bridge

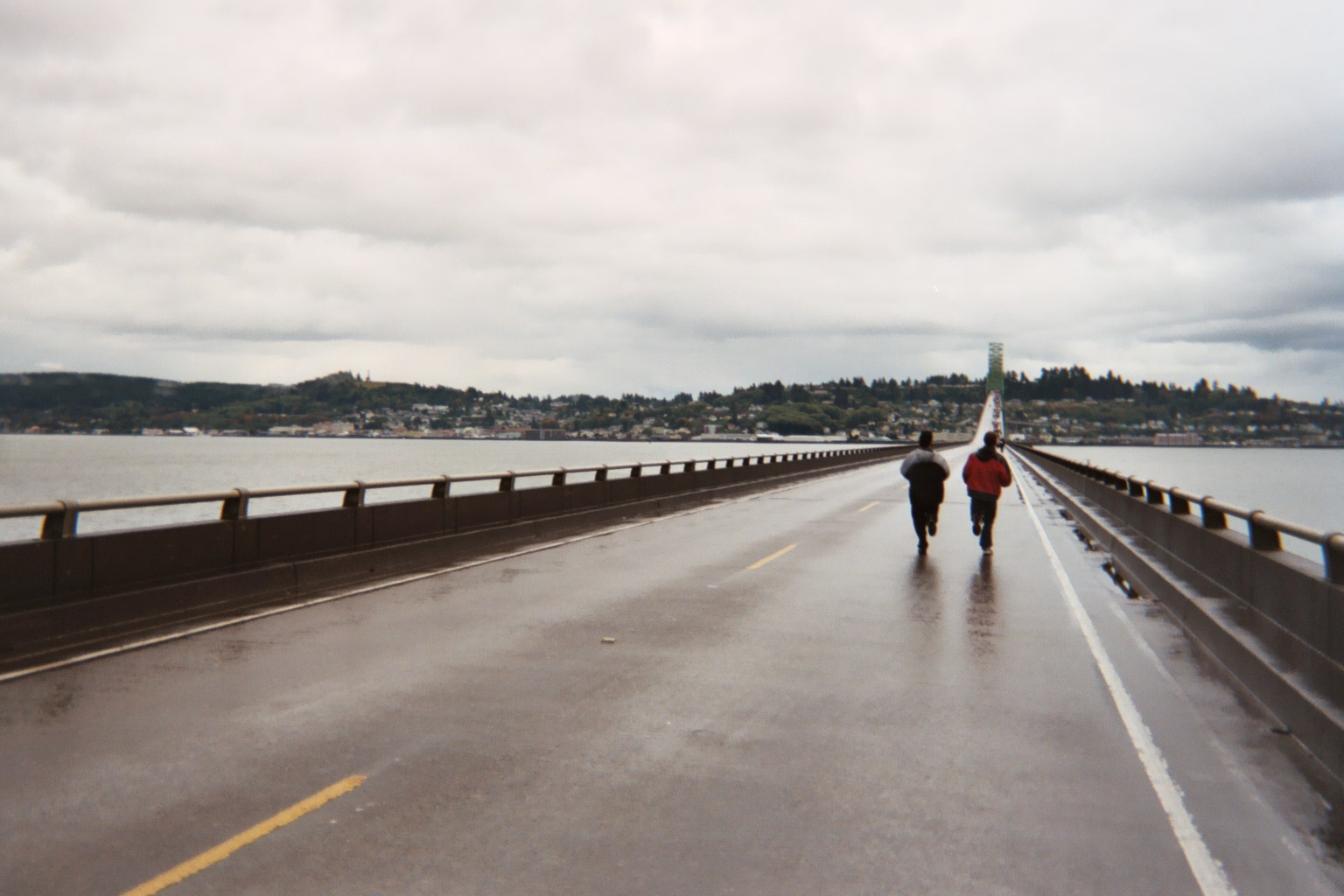
A view of the flat, continuous truss section of the bridge

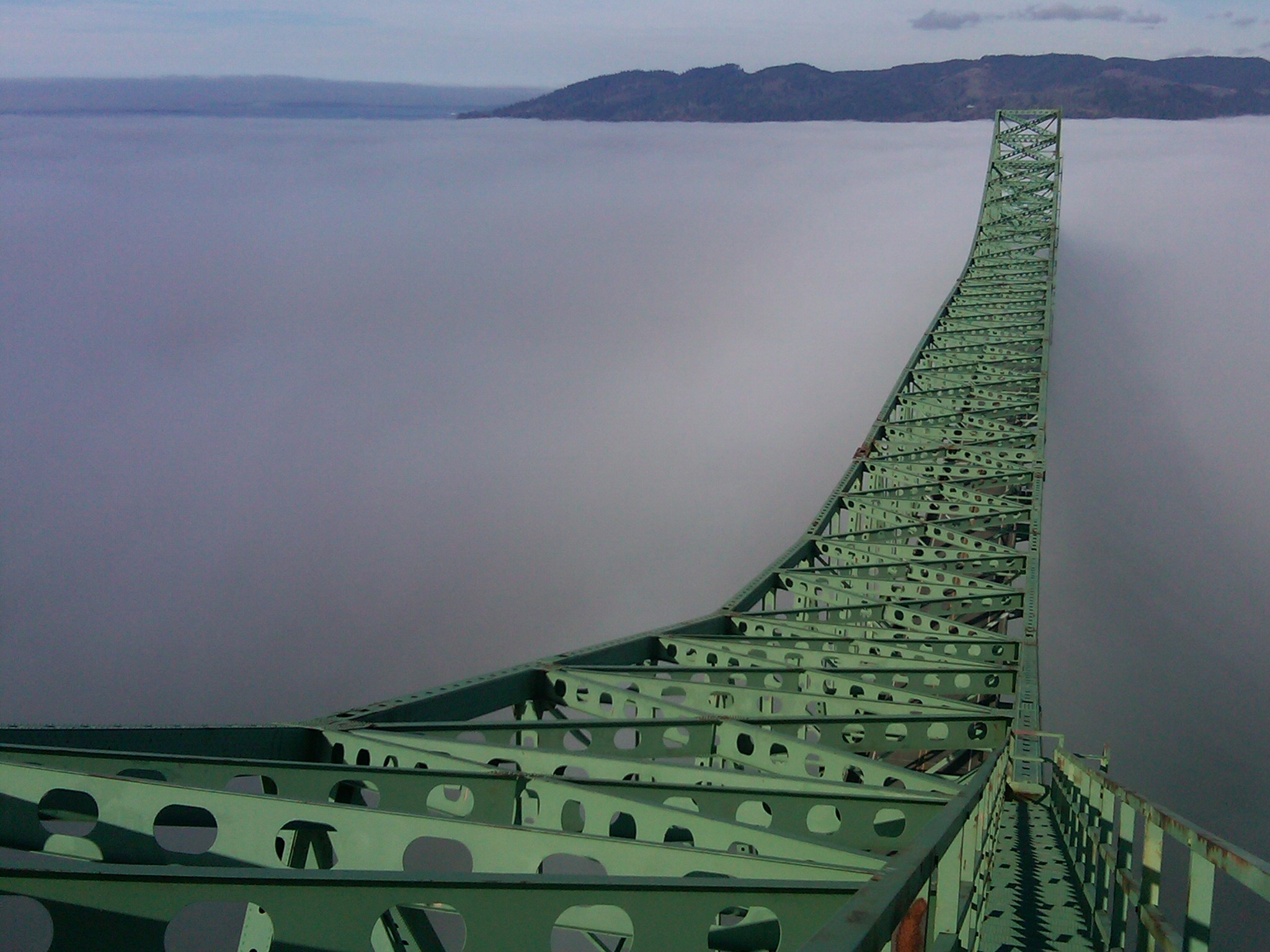
A workman's view from high on the bridge

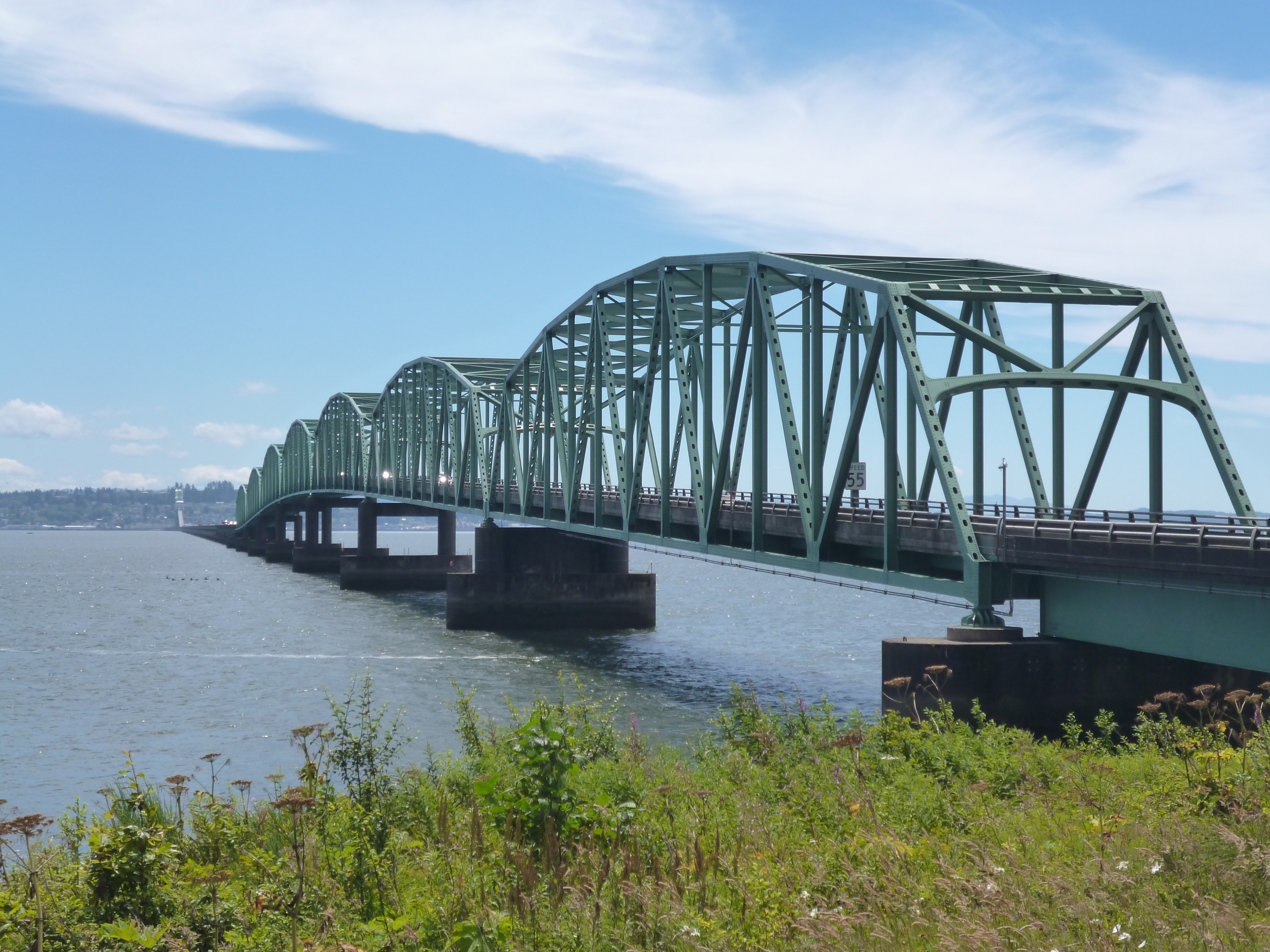
Washington end of the bridge

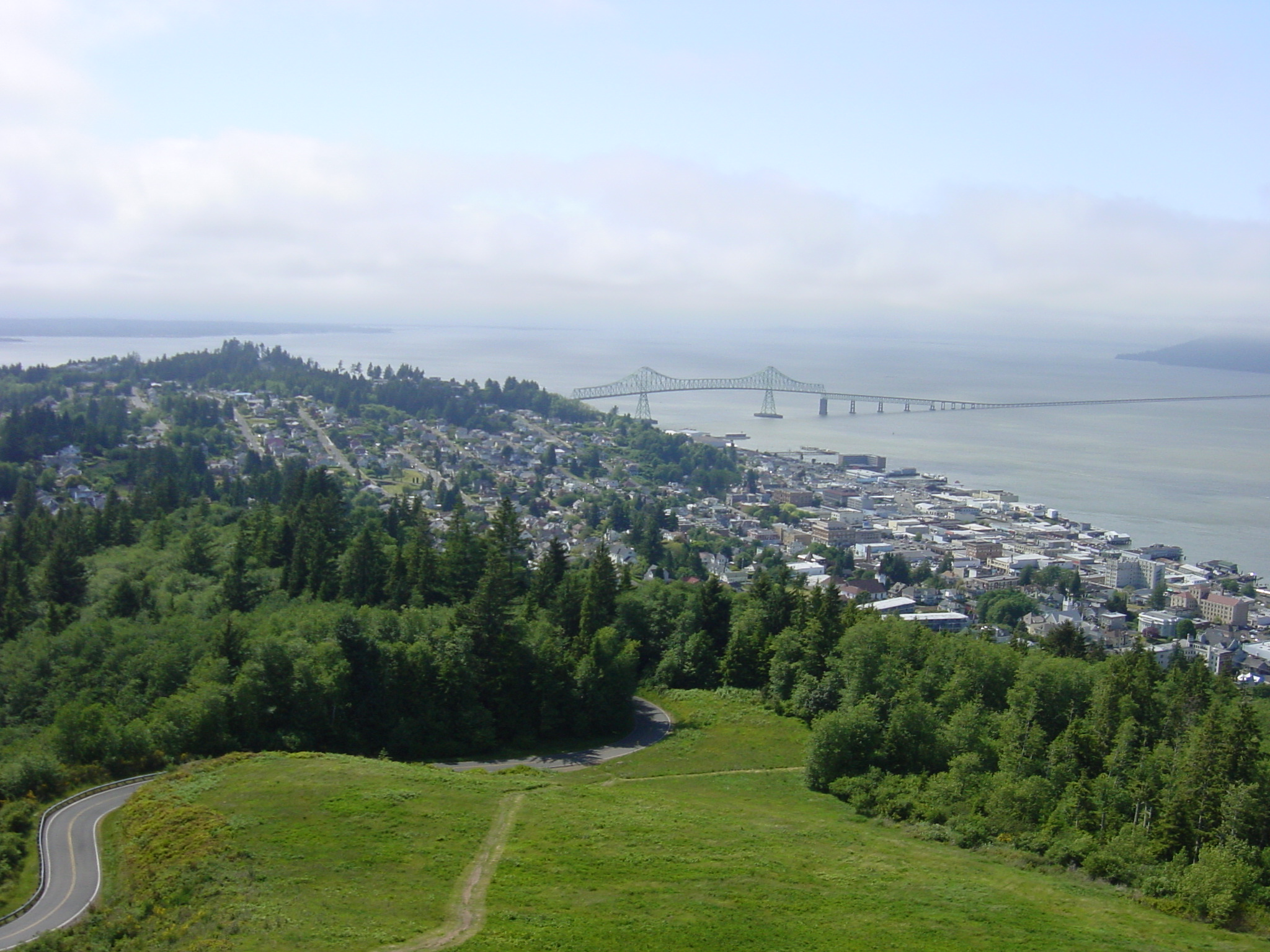
A view of the bridge from the Astoria Column

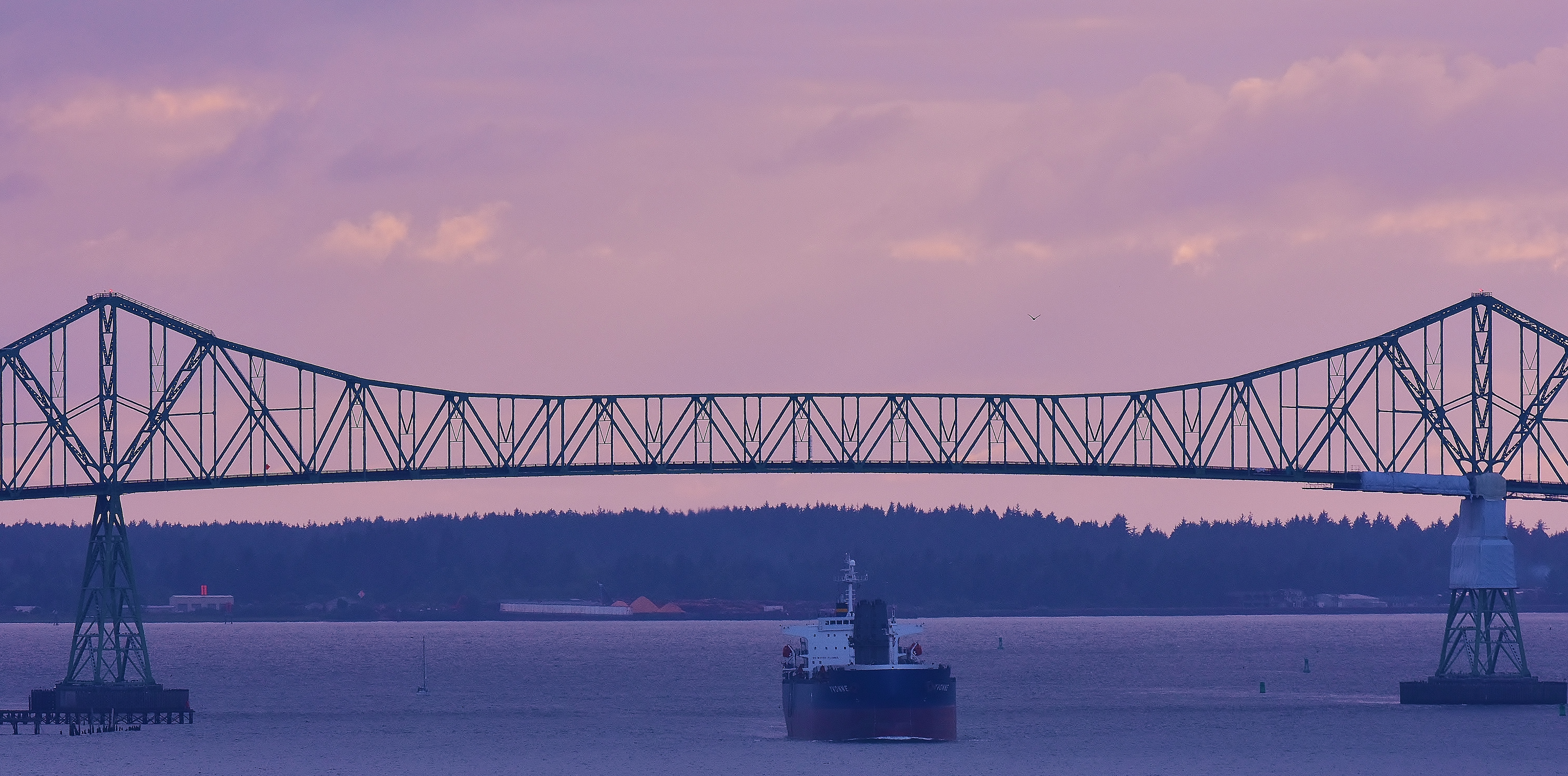
A cargo ship passing under the bridge

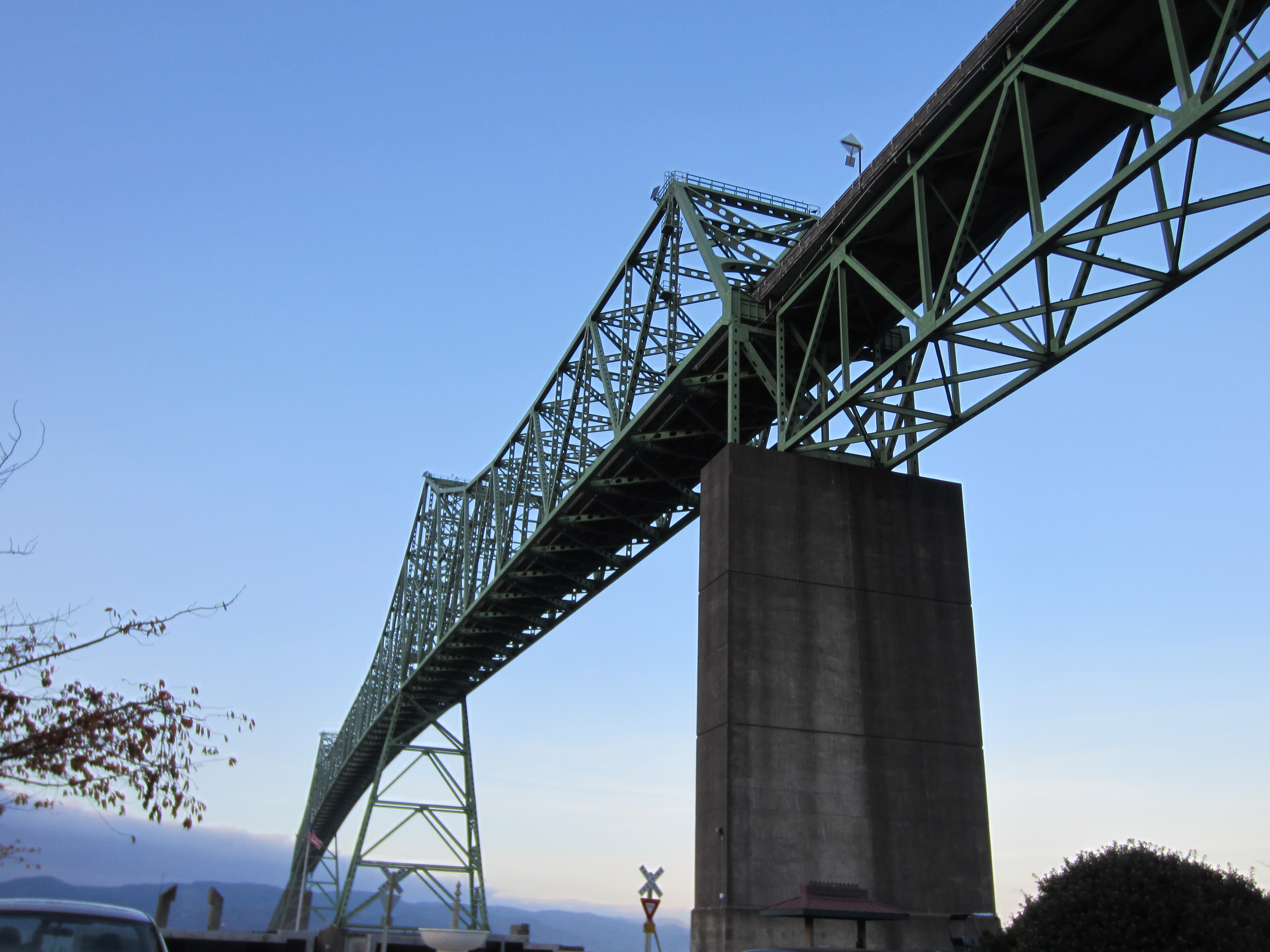
Looking up from beneath the bridge

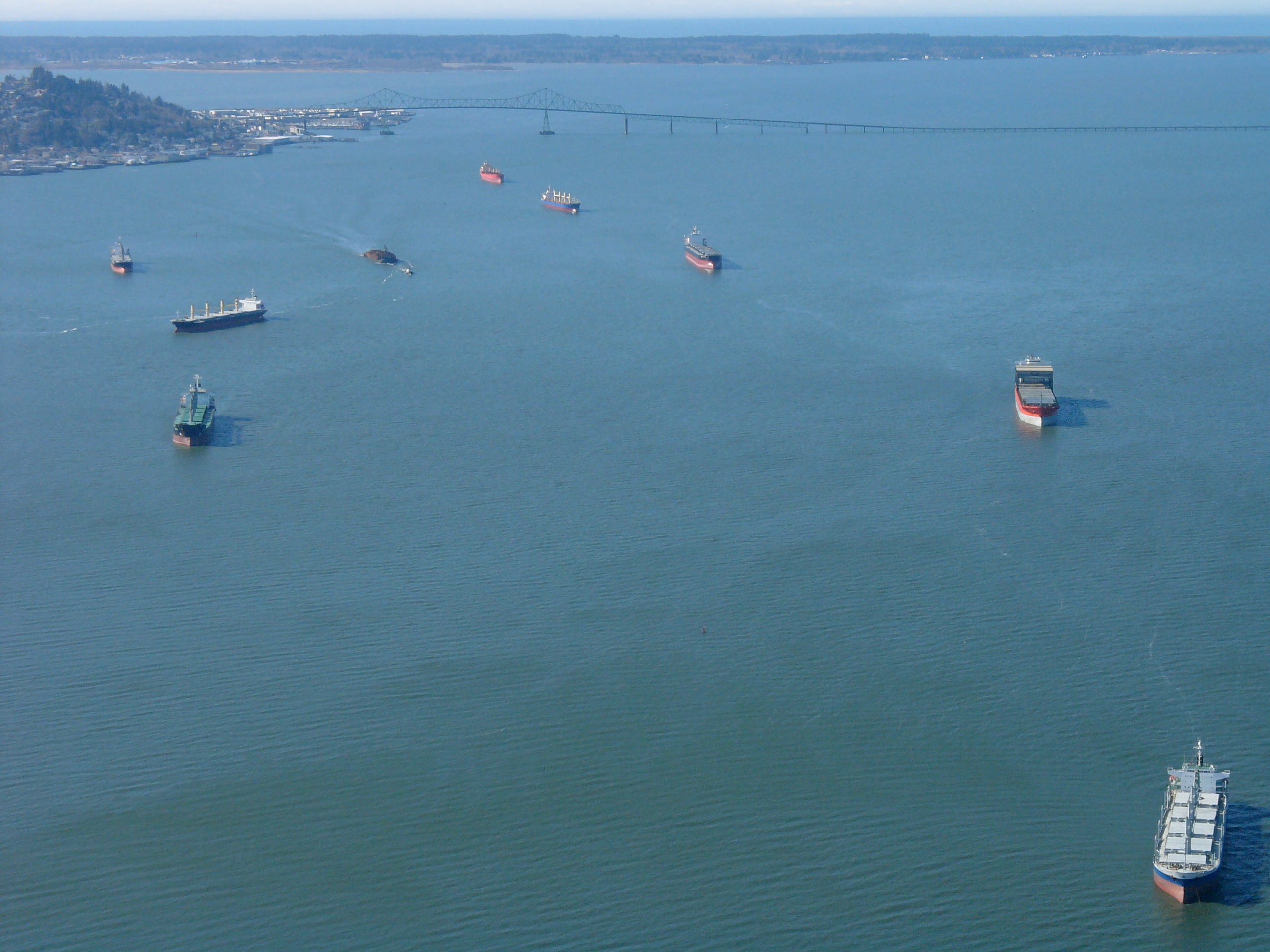
Multiple cargo ships with the bridge in the background

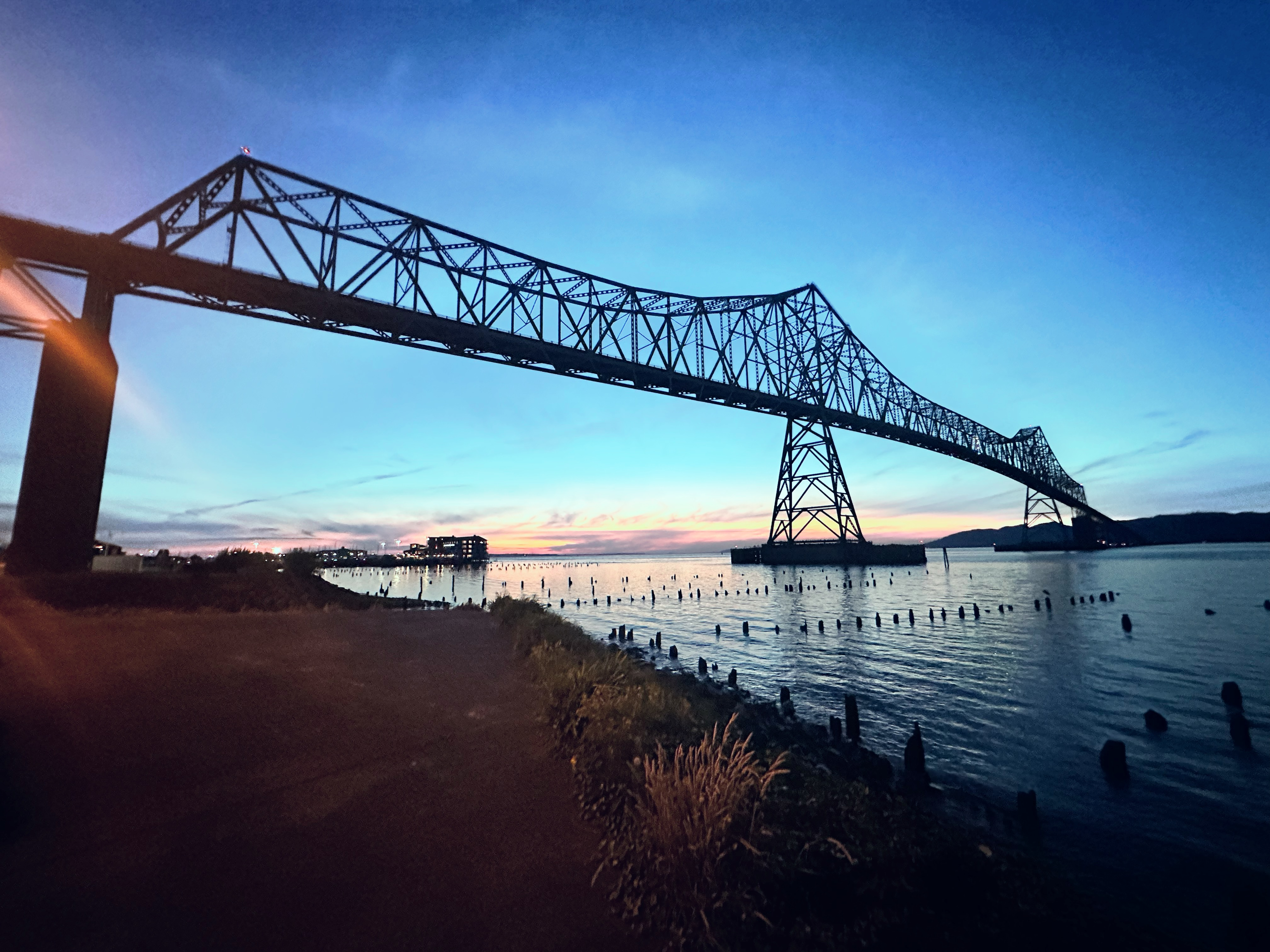
Bridge at twilight
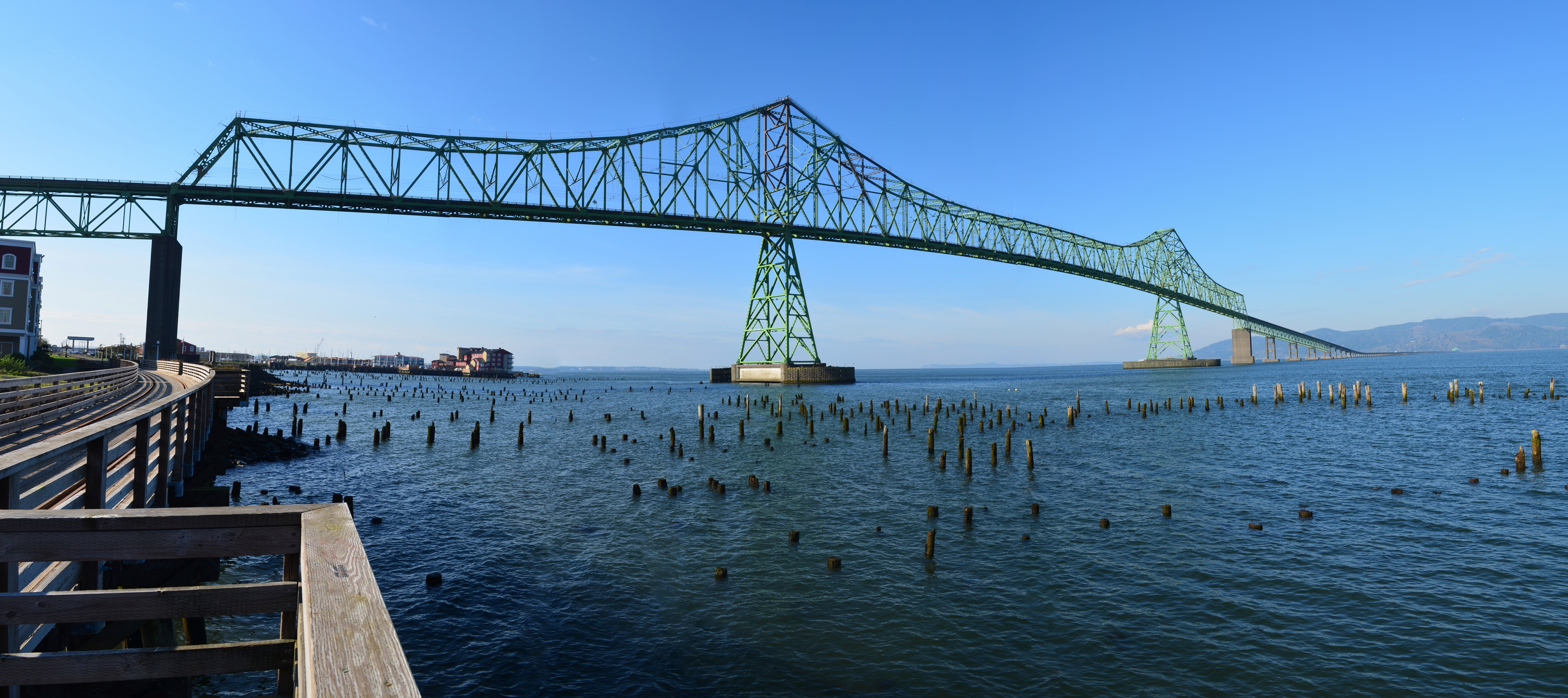
Panorama of the bridge, taken from Astoria, showing it reach across the Columbia towards Washington state.

== See also ==
- List of bridges documented by the Historic American Engineering Record in Oregon
- List of bridges documented by the Historic American Engineering Record in Washington (state)
- List of bridges on U.S. Route 101 in Oregon
