= Links (magazine) =

US magazine

LINKS
- LINKS Magazine
- Editor-in-Chief: George Peper
- Categories: Golf
- Publisher: Purcell Enterprises, Inc.
- Total circulation: 213,013 (2011)
- First issue: 1988
- Country: United States
- Based in: Hilton Head Island, South Carolina
- Language: English
- Website: www.linksmagazine.com
- ISSN: 1554-9151

LINKS (also known as Links Magazine, or Links: The Best of Golf in full) is an American quarterly golf magazine published by Purcell Enterprises, Inc. in Hilton Head Island, South Carolina. LINKS has a mission "of bringing the most engaging, sophisticated and surprising content to its audience of passionate golfers".

== Overview ==
LINKS Magazine targets serious golfers and provides reviews of both international and national golf courses, and often focuses on course design, course architects, real estate, and golf equipment. The magazine features many advertisements and product showcases. LINKS also publishes an annual "Premier Properties Guide", a resource for buyers of golf real estate. The issue features "America's 100 Premier Properties", the oldest list of the best private golf communities in the country.

== History ==
The magazine was launched in 1988 as Southern Links, a publication focused regionally around Hilton Head where the headquarters are located. In 1991 the company expanded its offerings with a new publication Western Links but ultimately merged the two publications in 1993 into a national publication Links: The Best of Golf.

In 2008, Links celebrated its 20th year in its January/February issue featuring Annika Sörenstam on the cover.

== Notable contributors ==
- Tom Doak
- Ernie Els
- Nick Faldo
- Jim Nantz
- George Peper
- Sandy Tatum
- Dick Taylor
- John Updike
- Jack Whitaker

== Controversy ==
In April 2007, Links Magazine apologized to Notes from the Road for publishing false information about Baker's Bay Golf & Ocean Club.

== See also ==
- Golf Digest
- Golf Magazine
- Golf World
