= Ilwaco Railway and Navigation Company =

Defunct narrow gauge railway in Pacific County, Washington

Overview
- Headquarters: Ilwaco, Washington
- Locale: Pacific County, Washington
- Dates of operation: 1889–1930

Technical
- Track gauge: 3 ft (914 mm)

The Ilwaco Railway and Navigation Company operated a 3 ft (914 mm) narrow gauge railroad that ran for over forty years from the bar of the Columbia River up the Long Beach Peninsula to Nahcotta, Washington, on Willapa Bay. The line ran entirely in Pacific County, Washington, and had no connection to any outside rail line. The railroad had a number of nicknames, including the "Clamshell Railroad" and the "Irregular, Rambling and Never-Get-There Railroad."

== Initial ownership and related companies ==
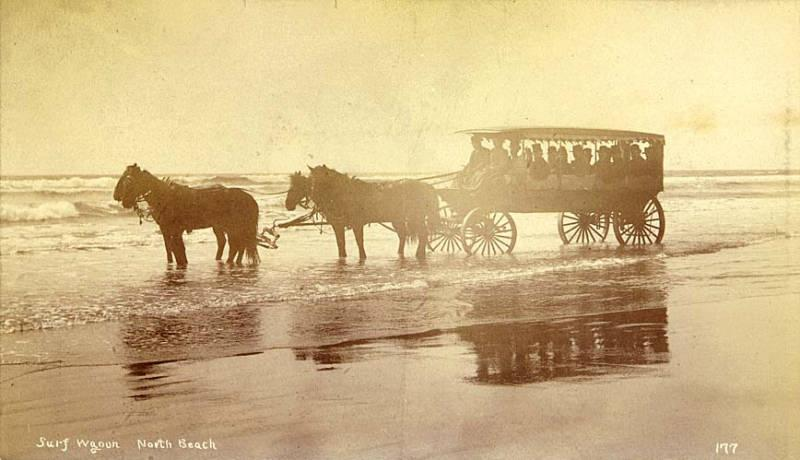
Wagon on North Beach circa 1892. Before the construction of the railroad a wagon like this one was the only way of access to the Long Beach peninsula north of Ilwaco.

The initial owners of the company were Lewis Alfred Loomis, Jacob Kamm, I.W. Case, H.S. Gile, and B. A. Seaborg. L.A. Loomis was a pioneer on the Long Beach Peninsula. He had formed the Ilwaco Wharf Company in July, 1874. In addition to Loomis, incorporators of the Ilwaco Wharf Company included Robert Carruthers, George Johnson, Abraham Wing, and Captain J.H.D. Gray. They sold shares and raised $2,500 to build a pier and freighthouse on Baker's Bay at Ilwaco, near the mouth of the Columbia River. Later, on February 23, 1875, L.A. Loomis and some of the same incorporators of the Ilwaco Wharf Company incorporated the Ilwaco Steam Navigation Company, with the goal of buying a steamboat and running passengers and freight across the Columbia from Astoria to the Ilwaco wharf that they had built. They sold stock again, raised $25,000 in working capital, and for $22,000, bought the steamboat General Canby.

Other steamboats making the run to Ilwaco in the days before the railroad was built include the U.S. Grant, the R.R. Thompson, and the General Miles. From 1884 to 1888, the Oregon Railway and Navigation Company is reported to have put the Alaskan on the run from Portland to Ilwaco.

For a number of years the company struggled to make a profit, relying on government mail and troop transport contracts, which did not pay much. Eventually L.A. Loomis and some of his fellow entrepreneurs settled on the idea of building a railroad to replace the stage coach line that they had used to make the connection between Ilwaco and points on the Long Beach Peninsula. Loomis and others incorporated the Ilwaco, Shoalwater Bay & Grays Harbor Railroad on November 23, 1883. Survey work was commissioned, to be done by Major A.F. Searles, of Portland. It was estimated that the railroad could be built for a cost of $5,000 per mile. This meant that it would take about $100,000 to build the railroad. The company's founders raised the money through sale of stock, which took several years to reach a level of capital where construction could begin.

== Construction ==
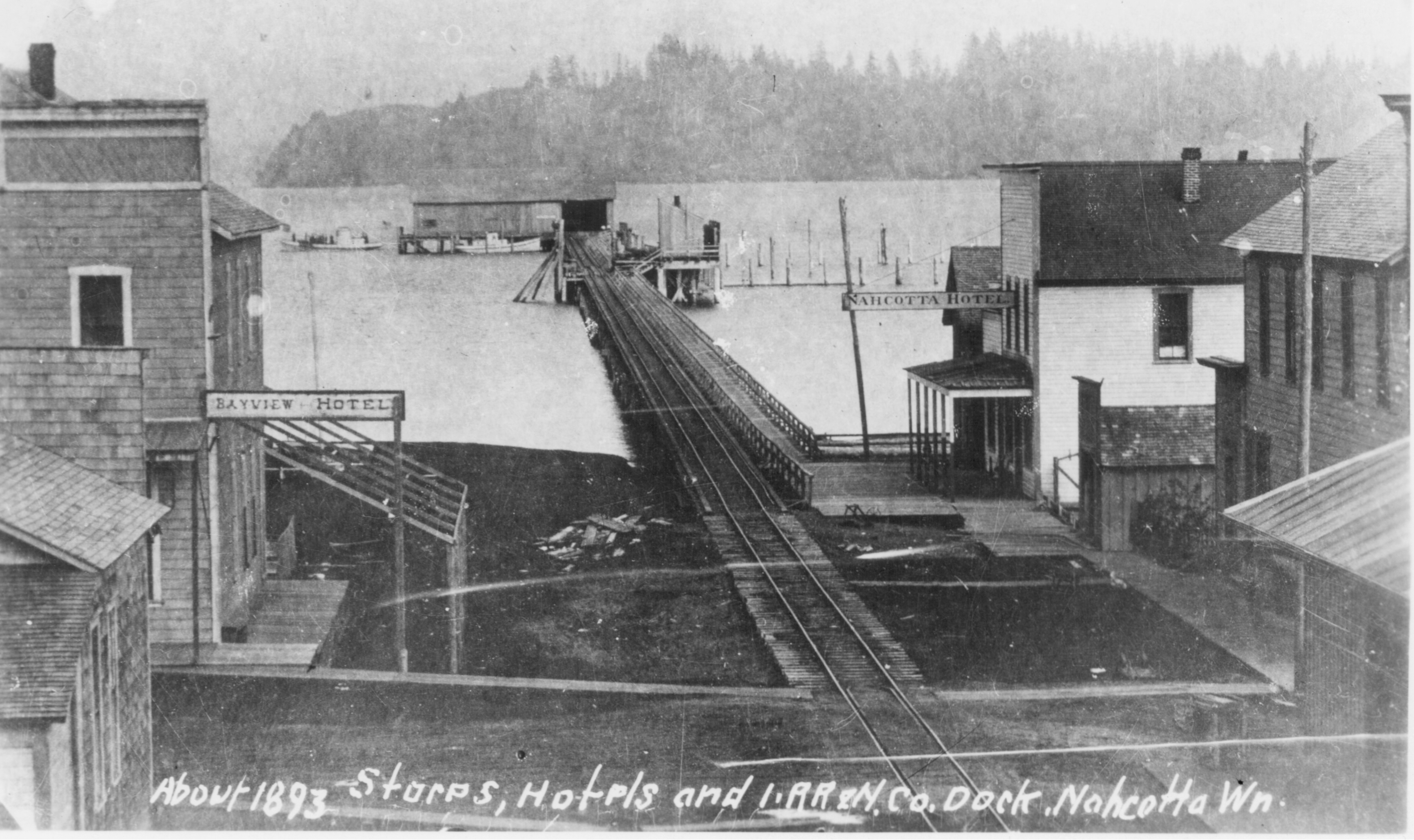
Nahcotta, WA 1893, looking east towards Willapa Bay

The company could not locate a general contractor who would build the railroad for less than the company's total capitalization of $100,000, so the company decided to act as its own general contractor, and hire the Portland firm of Hawgood & Habersham as engineering consultants. The 3 ft (914 mm) gauge was selected to save money on grading and other construction. Also, smaller and less expensive engines and cars could be used. The rails themselves, as well as one of the first engines, came from the Utah & Northern Railway, which had been converted to 4 ft 8 1/2 in (1,435 mm) standard gauge in 1887. The rails were light, 35 pounds to the foot (52 kg/m). By 1888, the railroad had picked up some more used rolling stock from the Utah and Northern, and completed laying track to Long Beach. Construction began in April, 1888, starting at Ilwaco. The corporation was reorganized at about the same time, so that the Ilwaco Steam Navigation Company became the Ilwaco Railroad and Navigation Company (incorporated August 16, 1888). Grading the rest of the line continued through the rest of 1888. The line had reached Long Beach by July 19, 1888. The northern terminus had been originally planned to be at place called New Saratoga, one-half mile south of Oysterville. It turned out that a better steamboat landing was at Nahcotta, about 5 miles (8 km) south of Oysterville, and so Nahcotta became the northern end of the line. By January 1889, grading was almost complete all the way to Nahcotta, however, the railroad had run out of money when the track only reached as far as Ocean Park. More funds were raised, and by May 1889, the railroad had been completed to Nahcotta, costing twice the originally estimated $100,000.

== Operations on original line ==
=== Frugality of management ===
The line was built with 35-pound-per-foot rail, which was too light for the equipment. Loomis as president was very frugal, especially on maintenance expenses. For example, even though there were several derailments caused by rotting cross-ties, Loomis refused to pay for any replacements unless he could punch a hole in the tie with his walking stick. For all of these reasons, it took the train several hours to complete its run of only 15 miles (24 km). No trains ran on Sunday, at least in April 1905. The railroad's early operations attracted some criticism from a local newspaper, which in an 1896 purported "advertisement" for the railroad, stated among other things:

Their Elegant Steam Tub Leaves Astoria every day that she can escape the eagle eye of the Inspectors.

Passengers are required to furnish themselves with life preservers, and to take their own risks, and also a pair of stilts in case of low water on the spit.
Notice--A spotter is employed on every train, to prevent beach visitors from being robbed by the Ilwaco Councilmen and attorney, while en route through the city. Keep on the train and no danger need be apprehended from that source. Passengers alighting in Ilwaco do so at their own risk.

=== Running by the tide ===
Because of the extreme shallow water at the railroad's dock in Ilwaco restricted steamboat access to times when it was permitted by the tide, for so long as the railroad's southern terminus was at Ilwaco, the railroad's schedule was based on the tide charts. For example, a schedule for April, 1905, shows times of departure from Astoria for the steamer Nahcotta as varying from as early as 5:00 a.m. to as late as 8:30 a.m. Mills imagined the scene as follows:

Just in time for the high tide of Ilwaco, a pompous little train rattled in from Nahcotta and waited at the wharf; then from across the bay would come the steamer, a neat side-wheeler such as the Ocean Wave, and tie up at the dock. Passengers rushed ashore to get good seats in the narrow coaches, while freight and baggage from the boat was tumbled on the dock. Quickly, before an ebbing tide could ground it, the boat hurried off, and the train whistled shrilly and clattered away with its load of passengers.

=== Steamboat connections ===
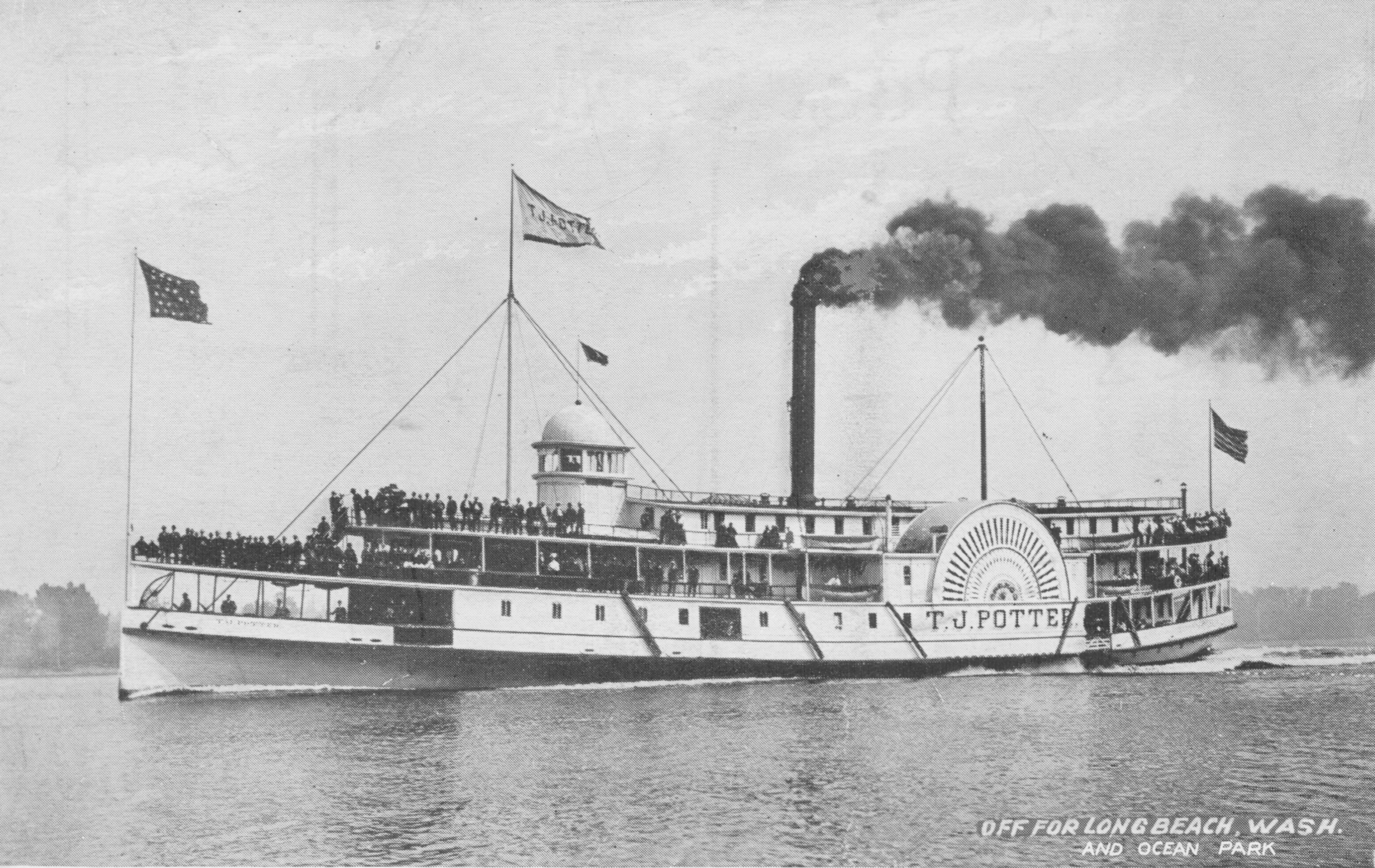
T.J. Potter on Columbia river, following reconstruction in 1901.

The line made connections with steamboats at both ends. At Ilwaco, steamboats meeting the trains included, at various times, the Ilwaco, Suomi, General Canby, Nahcotta, and the Ocean Wave. From 1894 to 1896, the company also put the naptha launch Iris on the Astoria-Ilwaco run. In 1898, the railroad commissioned the twin-propeller steamer Nahcotta, built in Portland, Oregon in 1898 and after resolving some engine troubles, placed her on the Astoria-Ilwaco run.

After the line was acquired by the Oregon Railway and Navigation Company in 1900, the company put the T. J. Potter on the route from Portland direct to Ilwaco to bring more vacationers to the Long Beach Peninsula. The new company also made improvements to line's trackage, which presumably resulted in the improvement of service so that it only took an hour to complete the train's journey from Ilwaco to Nahcotta. Presumably things had improved by 1905, when the railroad claimed to be able to make the run in just an hour from south to north.

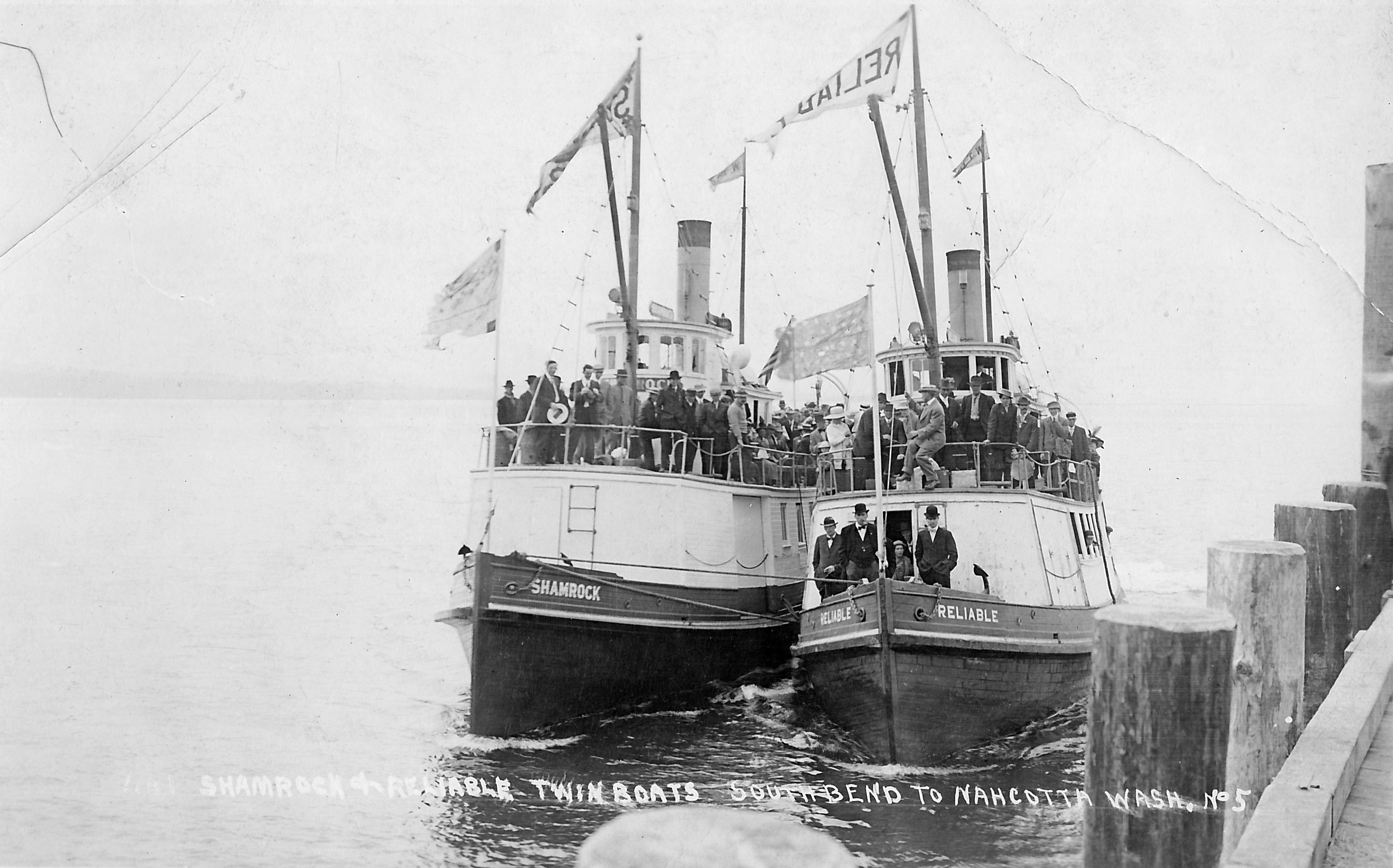
The Shamrock and Reliable meet the Ilwaco Railroad in Nahcotta for the trip to South Bend. 1902 - 1925

At Nahcotta the propeller steamers Shamrock and Reliable would meet the train at the end of the Nahcotta dock, and pick up passengers bound for South Bend across Willapa Bay. In 1896, another steamer employed on the Willapa Bay run was the Edgar.

=== Logging transport ===
Large logs were hauled out to the Ilwaco dock chained down to flat cars, one log to a car. There, they were dumped in Baker's Bay to be made into rafts for water transport to sawmills. Feagans also reports that very large logs were hauled on disconnect logging trucks, and provides a photo, but gives no date or location.

=== Personnel on original line ===
In 1891, the company's officers were L.A. Loomis, president, J.R. Goulter, secretary, and R.V. Egbert, Superintendent. Egbert left in 1895 and was replaced by Wallace Glover. Loomis and Coulter held their positions at least through 1896.

== Depots, stops and facilities on the original line ==
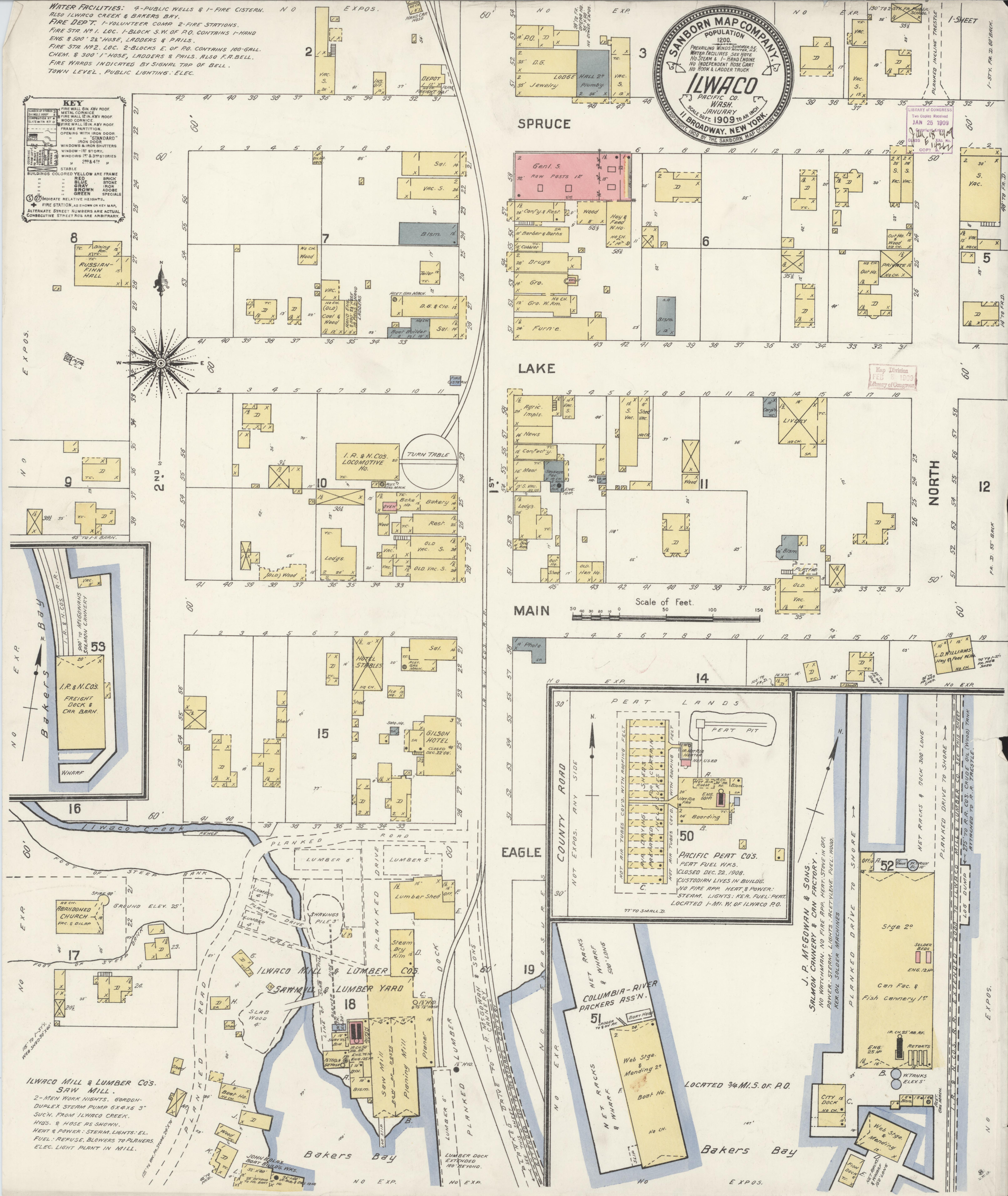
1909 Sanborn fire insurance map of Ilwaco, showing the tracks, depot and engine house locations.

Stops on the line in 1896 in order from south to north were Ilwaco, Holman Station, Seaview, Long Beach, Tioga, Breakers Station, Pacific Park, Cranberry Station, Oceanside, Loomis, Ocean Park, and Nahcotta.

=== Ilwaco ===
The railroad ran south down First Street in Ilwaco, and then out onto a dock in Baker's Bay. Floating logs were stored behind log booms on the west side of the Ilwaco dock.

=== Holman Station ===
A water tank was located at Holman Station, which was also known as the Willows.

=== Black Lake ===
The railroad kept a cranberry warehouse at Black Lake, a little north of Ilwaco. Feagans states that this warehouse was built about March 1915, the same time that the second Nahcotta depot was built to replace the one that had been destroyed by fire in January of that year. Black Lake itself was sometimes called Johnson Lake or Whealdon's Pond. B.A. Seaborg, one of the founders of the Ilwaco railroad, had a sawmill on the lake, where he cut boards to make crates to pack the salmon he canned at his plant (called "Aberdeen Packing Company") on Main Street in Ilwaco.

=== Seaview ===
There was only a platform and shed at Seaview until 1905 when a regular depot was built. That depot building still exists, and is now a restaurant.

=== Long Beach ===
The railroad's major destination was Long Beach, an early tourist trap, and location of a number of popular hotels, including the Tinker's Hotel and the Hotel Portland.

=== Breakers Station ===
The stop at the Breakers Hotel north of Long Beach was called Breakers Station and had a hotel.

=== Cranberry Station ===
Cranberry Station was the next stop north of The Breakers.

=== Loomis Station ===
Loomis Station consisted of simply the mansion of Lewis A. Loomis, the founder and president of the line. The station was on the east side of the line. L.A. Loomis died in 1913, his mansion fell into disrepair, and the railroad ceased making stops at Loomis. (The ghost station of Loomis Station should not be confused with the community of Loomis, Washington in Okanogan County.)

=== Oceanside ===
Oceanside is reported to have been an unscheduled stop from 1908 to 1930.

=== Klipsan Beach Life Saving Station ===
The railroad also took the crew of the Klipsan Beach Life Saving Station to wherever a vessel might have stranded on the beach along the line. Occasional special runs were made to bring on-lookers to a wreck site, and weekly excursions were made to take vacationers to watch the lifeboat rescue drills at the Klipsan Beach Station.

=== Ocean Park ===
Ocean Park had been founded by Methodists as an alcohol-free summer community. It was much closer to the beach than it is today, because of sand accretion. The depot at Ocean Park was located on the east side of the tracks immediately to the north of a road crossing. There were several businesses in the area. The railroad transported boxes of canned razor clams from canneries at Ocean Park. The railroad also built a siding in Ocean Park for the Ilwaco Mill & Lumber Company.

=== Nahcotta ===
The railroad built a long dock out into deep water in Willapa Bay at Nahcotta. Willapa Bay was the location of a major oyster fishery, and transporting the harvested oysters south to Ilwaco, and eventually Portland, became a significant business of the railroad. The first Nahcotta depot was located just south of the tracks. The lading extended northwards from a freight door a few feet towards the track, which at that point had a stub switch. The railroad had a three-stall roundhouse, water tank, and a gallows turntable at Nahcotta. Businesses in Nahcotta included the Bayview (formerly the Morrison) Hotel, built in 1889, and the Nahcotta Hotel, and Morehead's general store. Most of Nahcotta's business district burned down on January 27, 1915, and was never rebuilt, a total insurance loss of $32,500. The railroad ran a train of volunteers to Nahcotta to fight the fire. Structures lost included the first Nahcotta depot, valued at $1,500 for insurance purposes. The railroad's car sheds survived, as did the cars inside.

=== Oysterville ===
Oysterville was not a stop on the original line. In 1890, citizens of Oysterville attempted to organize an extension of the railroad north from Nahcotta to improve business conditions there, but were not able to raise the funds to do so.

== Improvements and extension under new management ==
In August, 1900, Loomis sold his stock to the Oregon Railway and Navigation Company, which assumed total control over the railroad, which had then total assets in rolling stock, track, and real property valued at $248,000. The new owners made a number improvements to the track and rolling stock of the railroad. Trains now ran faster and on time. The dock and railroad facilities at Nahcotta were improved. Two important safety items, air brakes and Janney couplers, were adopted in 1903. The railroad also got into the business of hauling logs from Nahcotta down to Ilwaco. The company acquired the steam tug Flora Bell to round up log tows on Willapa Bay and bring them to Nahcotta to be loaded onto trains bound for Ilwaco.

For a number of years there had been a plan by various persons and companies to build a standard gauge railroad all along the north bank of the Columbia from the ocean at Ilwaco to Wallula Gap near the junction of the Snake and the Columbia rivers. The first leg of this work was to be a railroad built along the north shore of the Columbia river from Ilwaco to Knappton, a small settlement 17 miles (27 km) to the east. The work was contracted out by the Columbia Valley Railroad, but it was supervised by the chief engineer of the Oregon Railway and Navigation Company. After various legal and survey matters settled the route (which actually ran inland from the Columbia shore), construction began in 1907 and was finally completed, following many legal and financial difficulties, in June, 1908, with a terminus at Megler.

The railroad never quite made it to Knappton, which was about one and a half miles further east. The most notable engineering feature of the extension was a tunnel, the only one on the line, blasted through the rock at Scarborough Head. This was right under an army coast defense facility known as Fort Columbia. A large dock, supposedly the largest on the Columbia was built at Megler. The tunnel was 910 feet (277 m) long and The dock was reported to measure 120 feet (37 m) by 900 feet (270 m) in area.

== Operations on the extended line ==
=== Marine connections improved at south end of line ===
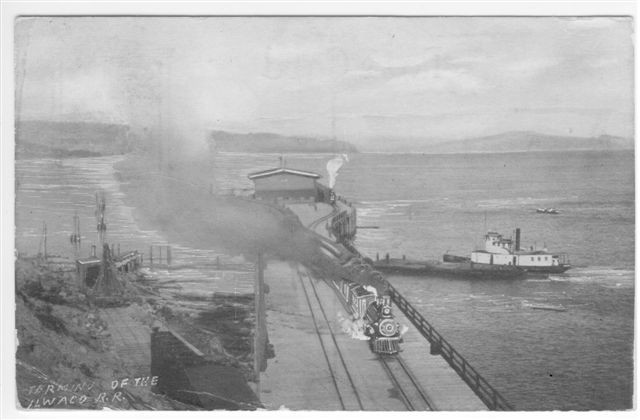
Ilwaco Railway dock at Megler, WA, looking southeast

Entire trains would run out on the Megler dock to large depot to meet steamboats arriving from Portland or Astoria. Because the water was deep enough all the time at the Megler dock, the railroad was finally able to run independently of the tide. In 1903, T.J. Potter made daily trips, departing from the Ash Street dock in Portland at 8:00 a.m. (1:00 p.m. on Saturdays, no run on Sundays). The heavily retouched photograph at right shows the Megler dock looking southeast.

- T. J. Potter at Megler Dock

At this time, the Willapa Transportation Company was running both of their steamboats, the Reliable and the Shamrock, on the run from South Bend to the Long Beach Peninsula, so that it was now possible to travel from South Bend by steamboat to Nahcotta, board the train and ride down to Megler, transfer to the T. J. Potter, and travel on the T. J. Potter upriver to Portland. The fare for this was $4.25 one-way and $7.25 round trip. The only alternative route required transfer to the Nahcotta, going south across the Columbia River to Astoria, and then boarding a train bound for Portland on the Astoria and Columbia Railroad. Since the rail trip from Astoria took as long to get to Portland as it took for the T. J. Potter to steam upriver, the alternative route was not favored.

=== Additional stops along extended line ===
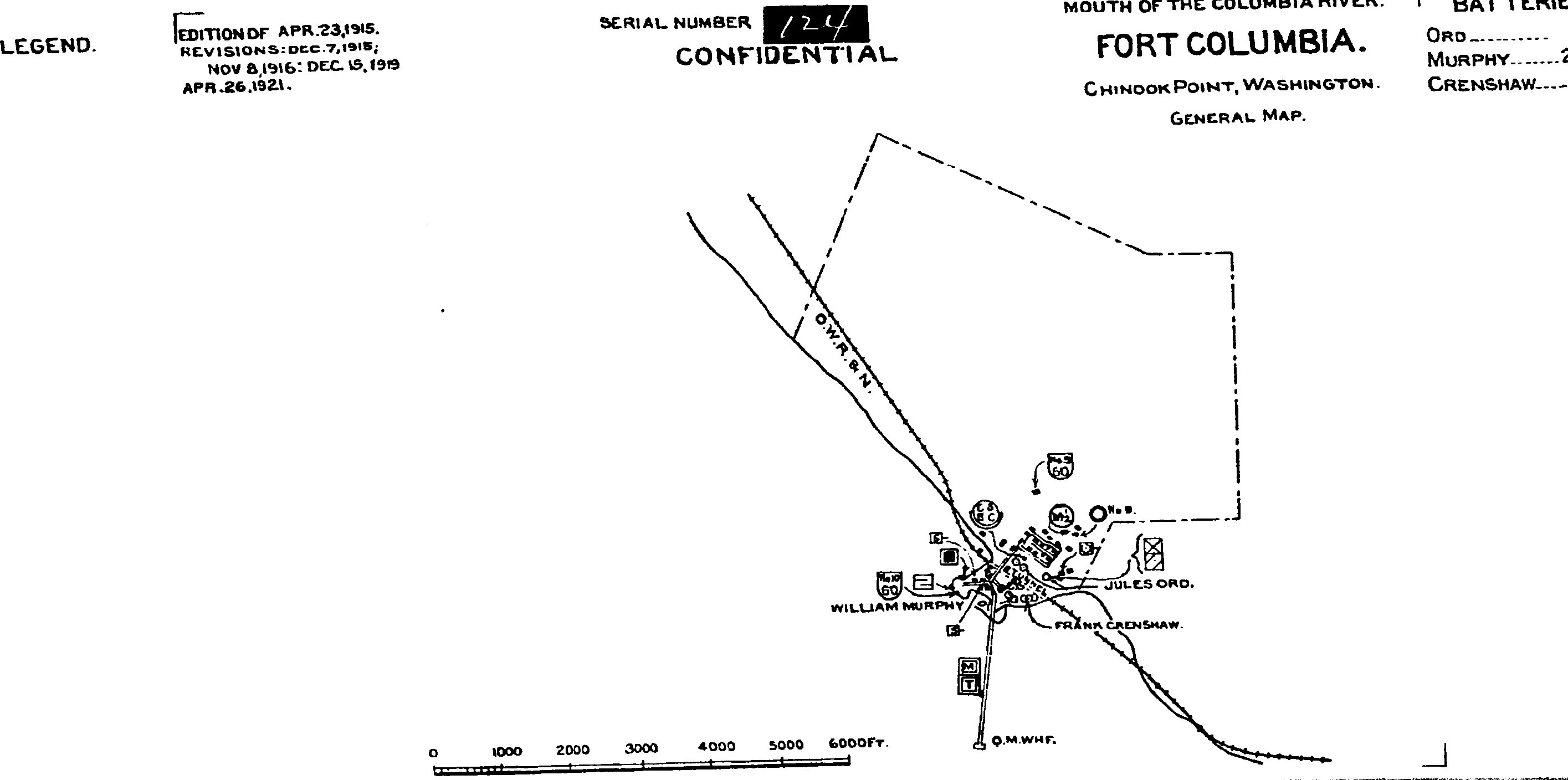
Fort Columbia and Ilwaco Railway line, 1921, overall view

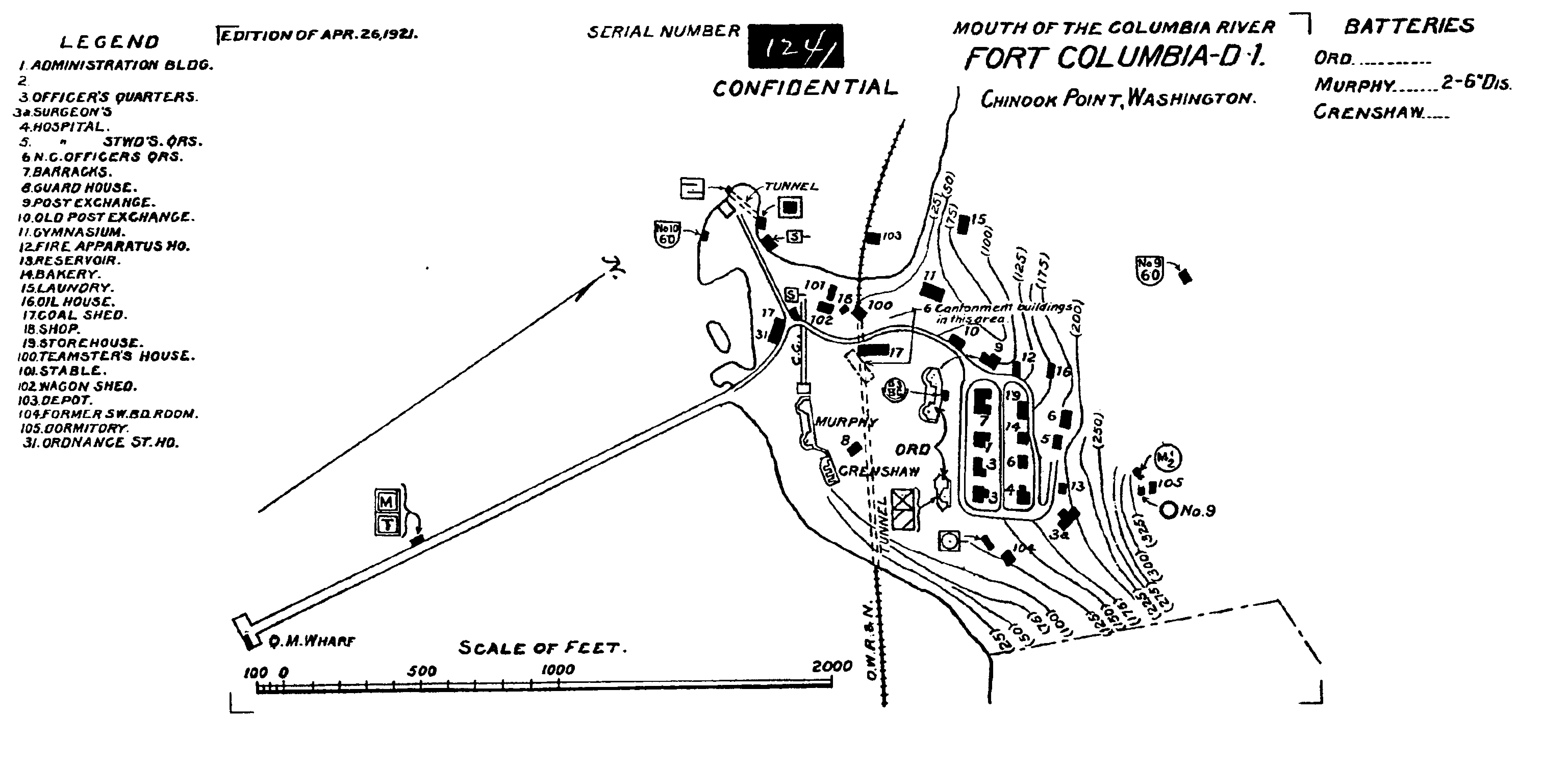
Fort Columbia, 1921, detail, showing locations of railroad tunnel under fort, quartermaster's wharf, officers quarters, batteries and rail depot

A traveller from Portland would board the train right on the dock at Megler. The train then proceeded almost due west for about 1/2 mile around Point Ellice, where, after 1921, Captain Elving's ferries would dock.

Next, for about a mile, the railroad ran along flat bench next to the river until it reached McGowan, where the McGowan family had built a large dock and a cannery. A passing track was built at McGowan. The railroad then entered the tunnel under Fort Columbia. Just on the west end of tunnel was the small depot for the fort's needs. A long pier extended into the river from Fort Columbia, this is shown on the Corps of Engineers maps as the pier "QM", for quartermaster.

The next stop on the line was Chinook, where the railway ran through the streets of the small town. By 1927, an auto road had been built from Megler to Chinook and then to Ilwaco. This roadway ran parallel to the railway up to Chinook, where the railway then went inland somewhat to cross the Wallicut river. Subsequent stops on the line's extension were Ellis, Wallicut, and a stop called China, after the large number of Chinese cannery workers who lived there.

=== Business reorganization and improvement with extension of line ===
Business increased substantially following the extension of the railroad. More passenger trains were run. Shipping of freight, particularly of raw logs increased greatly, until the Willapa Bay area was logged out a few years later. The extension had been built to allow ready conversion to standard gauge, by use of larger standard gauge cross-ties. However, by 1910, the Northern Pacific abandoned its plans to build out to the mouth of the Columbia on the north bank, and as a result the Ilwaco railroad never had any outside rail connection.

On December 23, 1910, the Union Pacific, the owner of the Oregon Railway and Navigation Company reorganized its operations, and the Ilwaco railroad became officially known as the Ilwaco Division of the Oregon-Washington Railroad and Navigation Company. The company then embarked on a publicity campaign to get more summer vacationers to travel to the Long Beach Peninsula. Improvements were also made to the rolling and floating stock of the company. Starting in the summer season of 1910 through 1913 (there was a slight dip in 1912 due to persistent bad weather at the beach), these efforts produced the most business the company had ever seen.

The summer of 1913 was the absolute peak for the railroad. The weather was good, a competitor resort had been destroyed by fire, and jetty projects at the mouth of the Columbia River required hauling passengers and freight. New facilities were built at Nahcotta and improvements were made to the station and trackage in Ilwaco. At this time, there were few automobiles on the Long Beach Peninsula. The railroad charged $68 to transport an automobile from Portland to Ilwaco.

== Decline and abandonment ==
After 1913, business fell off for the railroad, and would never come back to that peak. Even so, the owners continued to make some investments in the line, such as completing the relaying of the line with 56-pound rails all the way up to Nahcotta. A paved highway was completed from Portland to Astoria which caused river passenger traffic to fall off. The T. J. Potter was condemned at the start of the 1916 season and not replaced, which cut off direct water access to the Long Beach Peninsula from Portland (the source of most of the tourist business) to the railroad's dock at Megler. The railroad still ran the steamers Harvest Queen and Nahcotta down the Columbia until 1921, but apparently only on the Portland-Astoria run. This left only the previously thought inferior route of taking a train from Portland to Astoria and then a steamboat (usually the Nahcotta) to the Megler dock.

However, by 1920, the real competitor for the railroad had become the automobile. A paved highway on the south bank of the Columbia was completed in 1916, running from Portland to Astoria. On May 1, 1921, regular automobile ferry service was initiated from Astoria to a dock at McGowan, west of railroad's dock at Megler and closer to the Long Beach Peninsula. Now people could drive their automobiles all the way to Astoria and onto a ferry to take them over to the Long Beach Peninsula, without the need of either railroad or steamboat.

Ferry traffic quickly rose, and the ferry company, owned by Captain Fritz S. Elving, rapidly built new ferries (Tourist, Tourist No. 2, and later, Tourist No. 3) and dock facilities. The ferries departed from a specially-built dock at 14th Street in Astoria which included a ramp to allow rapid loading and unloading of automobiles. Pacific County, Washington helped out the Elving Company, giving them a $400 a year subsidy, and probably more importantly, building a road on pilings around the rocky promontory at Fort Columbia that the railroad had been forced to blast a tunnel through.

In 1926, the Union Pacific Railroad tried to best the Elving company by building their own automobile ferry, the North Beach. Union Pacific had ferry slips built at Astoria and at Megler. Although the North Beach was a well-built vessel, launched on April 28, 1927, with fanfare, and making its first run on July 6, 1927, North Beach could never manage to compete with Captain Elving's boats. J.W. McGowan, a businessman of McGowan, owned stock in Elving's ferry company, and he made it difficult for the railroad to build a road over his property to their competing ferry dock at Megler. Union Pacific shut down ferry operations to Megler in September 1930 selling to one of its employees, claiming they'd lost $40,000 per year in the ferry business.

Roads were extended and improved in the Long Beach Peninsula in the early 1920s. At the same time freight business fell off sharply for the railroad. Steamboat connections were lost both at Nahcotta and Columbia River terminals. Meanwhile, the railroad was still trying to pay the expenses for the expansion of the Megler facilities to accommodate the ferry enterprise.

In 1925, motor truck operators in Astoria started using the ferries to transfer directly over to the Long Beach Peninsula which cut sharply into the railroad's freight business. The railroad calculated that the line had suffered losses of $300,000 from 1925 to 1928. Apparently the railroad then hit on the idea of forming a new subsidiary, the Astoria, North Shore and Willapa Harbor Railroad, selling stock in the railroad to local residents, and then using the proceeds from the stock sale to buy out its losing operation. Supposedly the new operation would return the route to profitability by operating cheaper small diesel-electric engines and cut its expenses by 90%. The plan also included a new ferry for motor traffic and used of trucks instead of rail to deliver freight. There were some problems with the legality of the stock proposal, as the sale could not proceed without the approval of the Interstate Commerce Commission. Local opposition was high, and the plan eventually came to nothing.

This left abandonment of the line as the only realistic business option. In that time, abandonment of a common carrier's route required the consent of the Interstate Commerce Commission. The Union Pacific sought this consent, and following a hearing, on July 12, 1930, the railroad obtained permission to abandon from the Interstate Commerce Commission and the Washington Utilities and Transportation Commission. Asay summed up the terrible financial condition of the railroad at this time:

There was no question that the line was financially hopeless; passenger traffic had declined from almost 33,000 riders in 1924 to only 10,700 in 1929. Operating revenues amounted only to $18,622 in 1928, while expenses hovered at nearly $85,000. Worse, the O-WR&N had incurred a deficit of $127,000 rebuilding the Megler terminal and roadway for the ill-fated ferry service.

The last train was run on September 9, 1930. Feagans describes the scene as follows:

With Clem Morris at the throttle, engine No. 2, dragging a coach and the combine, made its leisurely way south from Nahcotta and then returned. Mrs. Taylor, of Ocean Park, who had been on the first train in 1889, was a prominent passenger on the last one. On the engine the peninsula residents hung a mourning wreath for a railroad that had served them well for 42 years. *** Ilwaco's Mayor Brumbach, who had attended the groundbreaking ceremonies over forty years before, addressed the citizenry from the rear platform of the train. Taps was sounded from an old bugle, and as the 3:30 train departed for the last time a salute was fired from the town cannon, to be answered with a long trailing whistle from the locomotive.

By the summer of 1931, all the structures (save for the Megler terminal), the engines rolling stock of the railroad had been sold to a scrapping firm in Portland for $28,000, and the rails and ties ripped up from the roadbed.

== The railroad route today ==
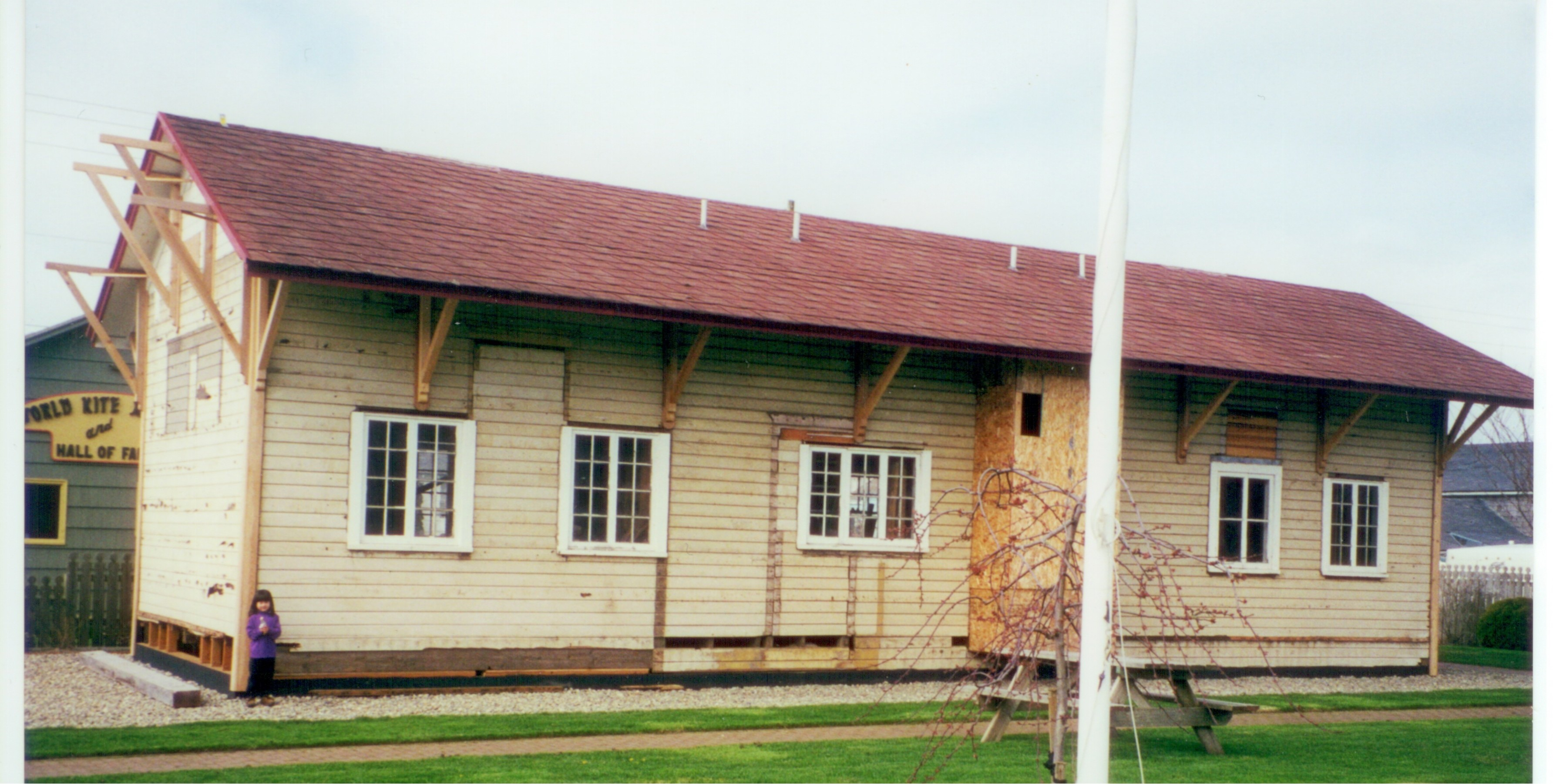
Long Beach, WA depot under restoration

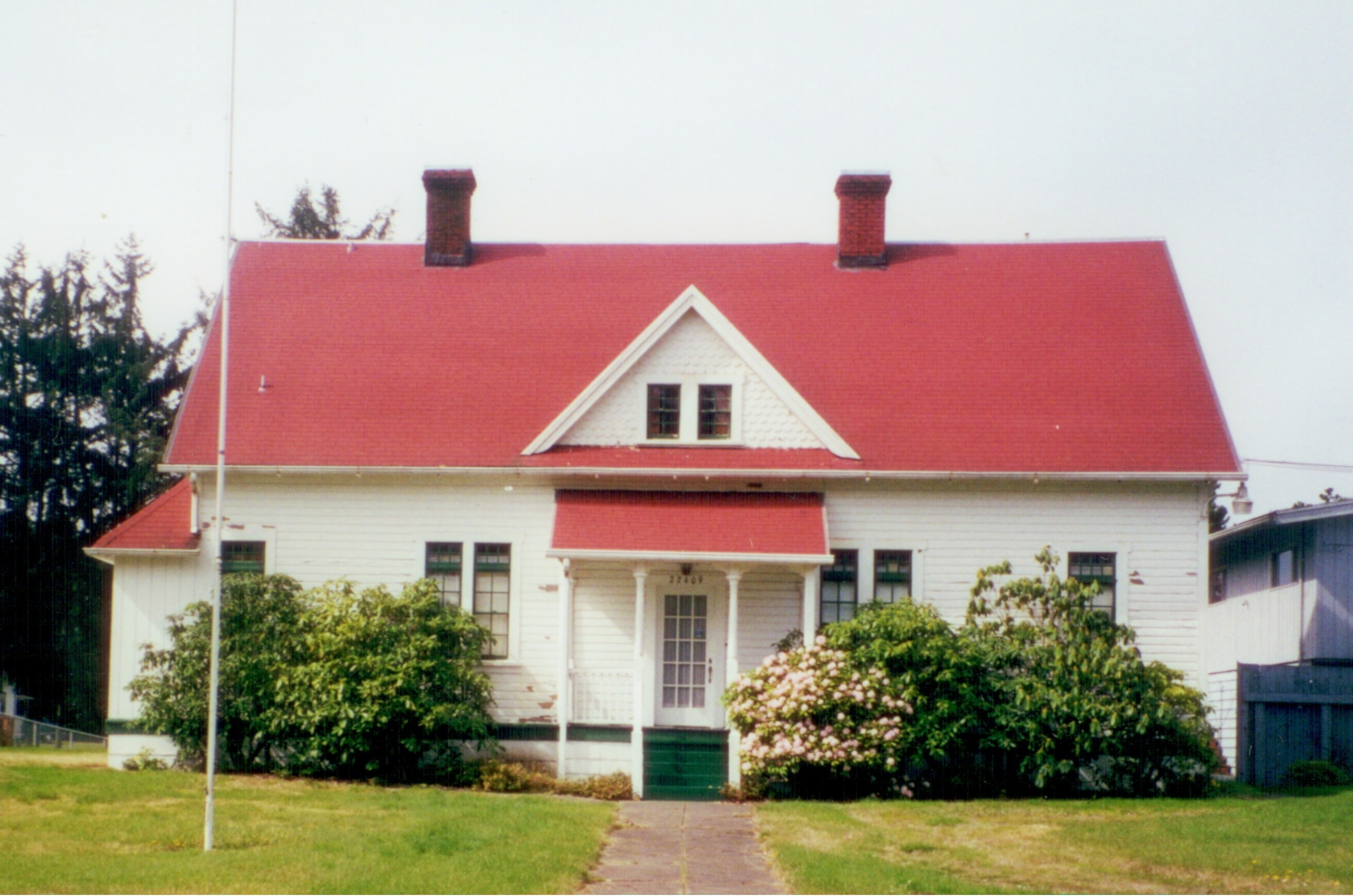
Klipsan Beach Life Saving Station, NHS

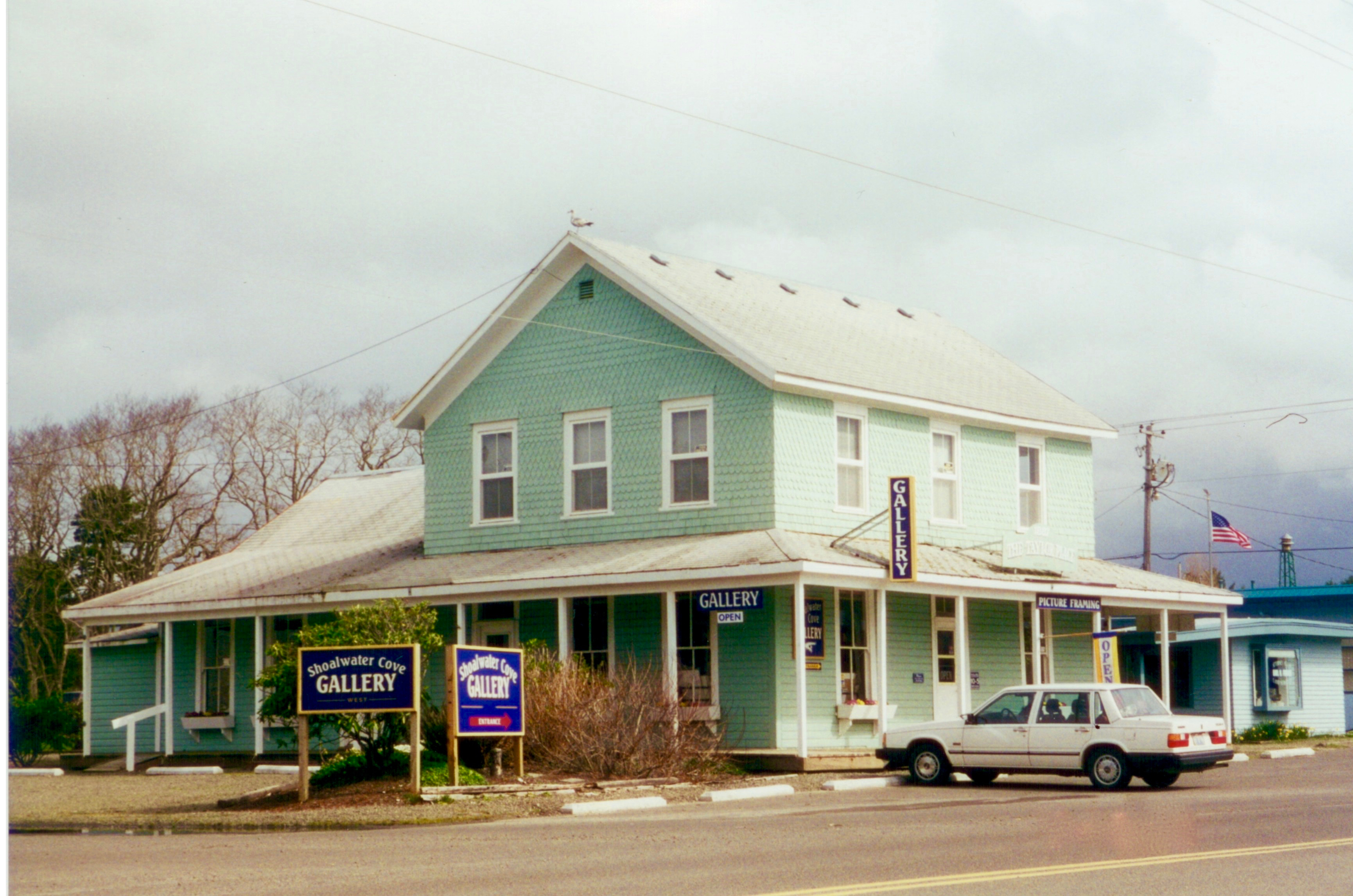
Taylor Hotel building, Ocean Park, WA

Since 1966, the Astoria-Megler Bridge has crossed the Columbia River, replacing the ferry lines. Its northern bridgehead is just about midway between McGowan and the site of the railway's Megler dock to the east.

Feagans in the early 1970s was able to trace many relics of the railroad. He was also able to interview people who well remembered the railroad and who had even worked on it. These sources may have helped Feagans as he traced down at least four passenger coaches that had been lifted off their trucks and converted into housing units in various locations in Long Beach. He located and photographed various artifacts including a baggage rack and an iron coach stove. Feagans also photographed the ruins of the trestle crossing the Wallacut river and the dock at Nahcotta, as well as places where the rails for whatever reason, had been left in place.

In March 2000, an inspection of the area showed surprisingly many structures still standing related to the railroad. The tunnel under Fort Columbia, widened and shortened, continues to be used by the highway. Fort Columbia itself continues to be maintained well as a state park. The Ilwaco freight depot, which was in a derelict state in the early 1970s, had been restored and permanently preserved as part of the Columbia Pacific Heritage Museum.

At Long Beach the old station survived as a pair of housing units. By the year 2000, the Long Beach Station had been purchased relocated to a park area by the city. As of March 25, 2000, the station was being reconstructed, as shown in the photo at left.

North of Long Beach, the life saving station still remains, although several remodeling efforts and overgrown shrubs and trees obscure the original architecture. The station has been placed on the National Register of Historic Places. The highway appears to pass at just about the same distance from the station as did the railway.

The Seaview depot still remains, but is converted into a restaurant. At Ocean Park, the railway ran in the street in front of the Taylor Hotel, built in 1887. The building was still standing and in good condition as of October, 2012, when it was operated as a coffee shop/bookstore called Adelaides. In Nahcotta, the depot built after the 1915 fire, still stands but is now (as of March 2000) a grocery store.

== Rolling and floating stock ==
=== Locomotives ===
Table 1: Locomotives of the Ilwaco Railway and Navigation Company
No.	O-W R&N renumber	Union Pac. #	Type	Driver diameter	Cylinders	Boiler pressure	Builder	Builder #	Date Built	Weight (lb)	Tractive effort (lbf)	Overall length	Remarks
1			2-6-0	42"	12-18"	125 psi	Baldwin	4564	3/79	39,000	6,557	42'6"	ex Utah & Northern #15, sold to IR&N 1888 for $2,500, #15, scrapped either 1911 or 1915
2			2-6-0	40"	12-18"	125 psi	Porter	1155	4/90		7,430		Built for IR&N for $6,075, scrapped or sold 1908
3			2-4-0	42"	10-18"	125 psi	Porter	289	2/78	20,000	5,600		Built for Walla Walla & Columbia River RR as #5, also called "Mountain Queen" on that line. Sold 1892 to Mill Creek Flume and Manufacturing Co., then in 1894 to the Cascades Railroad serving as their #7; sold 1900 (Robertson) or 1905 (Feagans) to a southern Oregon logging concern.
3 The IR&N had two locomotives numbered "3."	N1	1	4-4-0	43"	14-18"	130 psi	Baldwin	4224	12/77	45,500	7,837	46'6"	Known on IR&N as the "second No. 3". Built 1877 for South Pacific Coast as #7 and later #26. Sold Feb 1907 to IR&N for $2,500, delivered Aug 1908 scrapped 1937 (Robertson) or 1931 (Feagans).
4	N2	2	2-6-0	42"	12-18"	125 psi	Baldwin	5121	5/80	45,500	7,837	42'6"	Built for Utah & Northern as #19, later #23, sold 1887 to Portland and Willamette Valley Railway as #1, bought by IR&N in 1906 for $500, scrapped 1941 (Robertson) or 1931 (Feagans).
5	N3	3	4-4-0	43"	12-18"	140 psi	Baldwin	4956	2/80	50,400	8,560	50'6"	Built for South Pacific Coast as #9, rebuilt 1905, sold to IR&N July 18, 1908 for $2,645, scrapped 1937 (Robertson) or 1931 (Feagans)
6	N4	4	4-6-0	48"	16-24"	140 psi	Baldwin	1925	5/91	74,000	12,430	47'6"	Largest engine ever used on IR&N. Built for South Pacific Coast as #23, sold to IR&N on January 1, 1907 (Feagans) or February 1907 (Robertson), for $5,700, scrapped 1931

=== Passenger equipment ===
Table 2: Passenger Equipment of the Ilwaco Railway and Navigation Company circa 1910
No.	Renumber	Type	Name	Date Built	Builder	Length	Width	Height	Pass. Cap.	Remarks
250	N1	combine	"Combination"	1890	Jackson and Sharp	42' 3"	8' 4"	12'	32	Built new for IR&N
251	N2	mail and baggage			Harlan and Hollingsworth	35'0"			0	
300	N10	coach	"Nahcotta"		Pullman	36'0"			44	Built new for IR&N. Preserved at Columbia Pacific Heritage Museum.
301	N11	coach	"Loomis"	1890	Jackson and Sharp	42' 3"	8' 7"	11' 4"	48	Built new for IR&N
302	N12	coach	"Easterbrook"	1890	Jackson and Sharp	42' 3"	8' 7"	11' 4"	52	Built new for IR&N
303	N13	coach	"North Beach"	1890	Jackson and Sharp	42' 3"	8' 7"	11' 4"	50	Built new for IR&N
304	N14	coach		1879	Carter Bros.	39' 11"	8' 0"	11' 4"	50	From South Pacific Coast 1908
305	N15	coach		1880	Carter Bros.	39' 11"	8' 0"	11' 4"	50	From South Pacific Coast 1908
306	N16	coach		1880	Harlan and Hollingsworth	39' 8"	8' 0"	11' 7"	50	From South Pacific Coast 1908
307	N17	coach		1887	Carter Bros.	38' 0"	8' 6"	11' 9"	46	From South Pacific Coast 1908
308	N18	coach		1887	Carter Bros.	38' 0"	8' 6"	11' 9"	46	From South Pacific Coast 1908.
309	N19	coach		1874	Carter Bros.					
310	N20	coach		1879	Carter Bros.					
311	N21	coach		1880	Carter Bros.					

=== Steamboats and other floating stock ===
For further information, see Steamboats associated with Ilwaco Railway and Navigation Company.

== See also ==
- Pacific County, Washington
- Astoria, Oregon

=== Rolling Stock ===
- Society for the Preservation of Carter Railroad Resources

=== Maritime connections ===
- Columbia River Maritime Museum
- Steamboats of Willapa Bay
