= Notes from the Road =

Notes from the Road is an American online travel journal and blog founded in 1999 by travel writer Erik Gauger, which focuses primarily on North America.

Gauger founded the site in January 2000 to let friends know about his travels, and has since broadened to include other content such as details about political disputes between preservationists and developers in various parts of the globe.

== Overview ==
According to the site, "Notes from the Road is a project in experimental travel writing - it is about subjective travel; the kind of real world of random things and real people." The focus of the travelogue is not in specific destinations, but in the subjects of travel, from cultural history, to biology, and to the importance of travel writing in society.

Notes from the Road covers travel issues which are rarely covered by the travel media, such as controversial environmental battles such as those on Great Guana Cay and Sand Mountain.

== Recognition ==
Forbes magazine praised the site in 2008 for having "photos worthy of National Geographic", and called it the best-looking travel blog they had seen. Forbes also noted that the navigation system was poor and that links were often overlaid over photographs. Notes from the Road was also picked as a favorite website by Time Magazine in 2005.

== See also ==
- Family Travel Forum
