= Solang Valley =

Valley in Himachal Pradesh, India

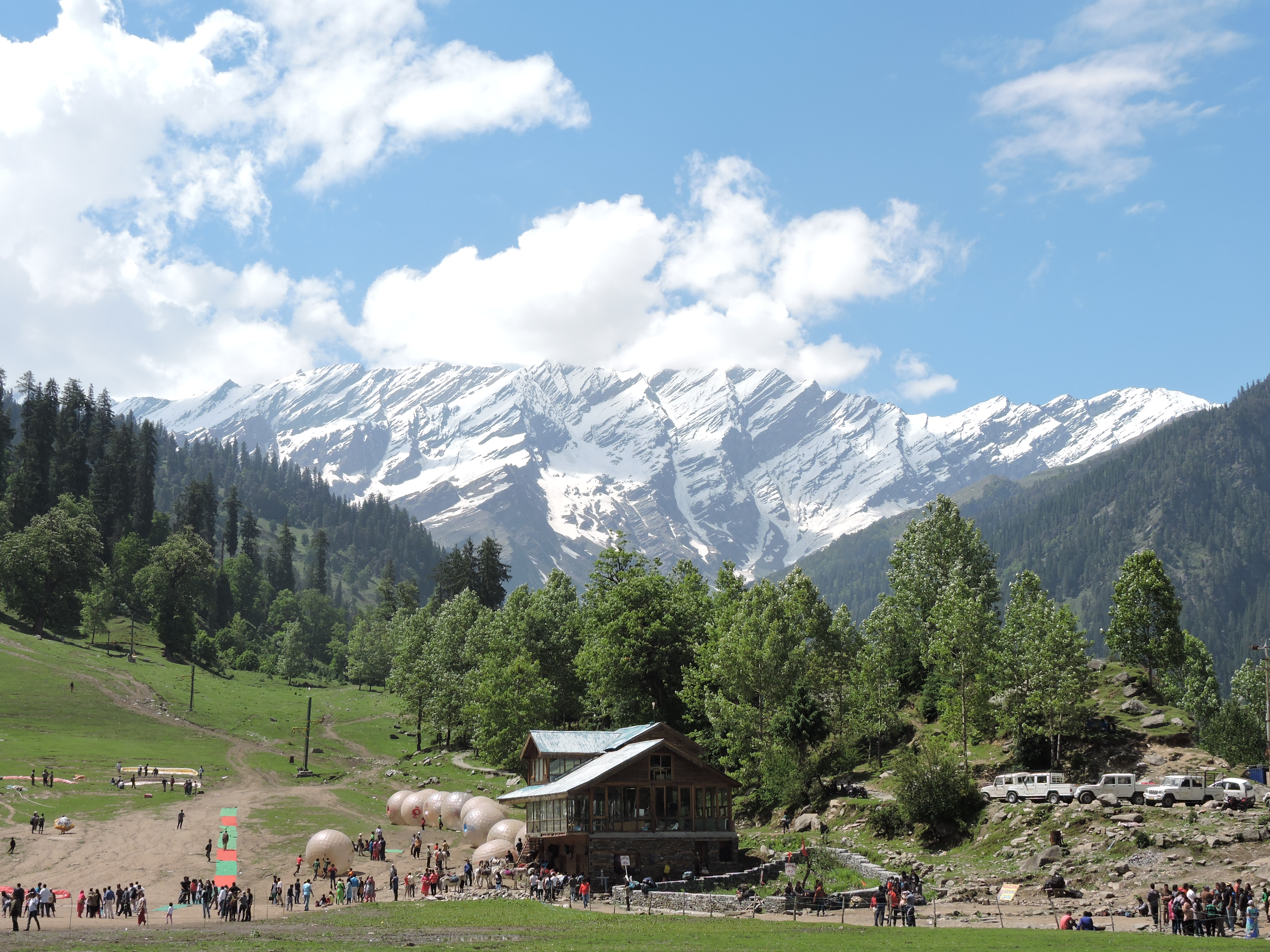
- Solang Valley in Himachal Pradesh

- Location within Himachal Pradesh
- Coordinates: 32.316°N 77.157°E
- State: Himachal Pradesh
- District: Kullu district

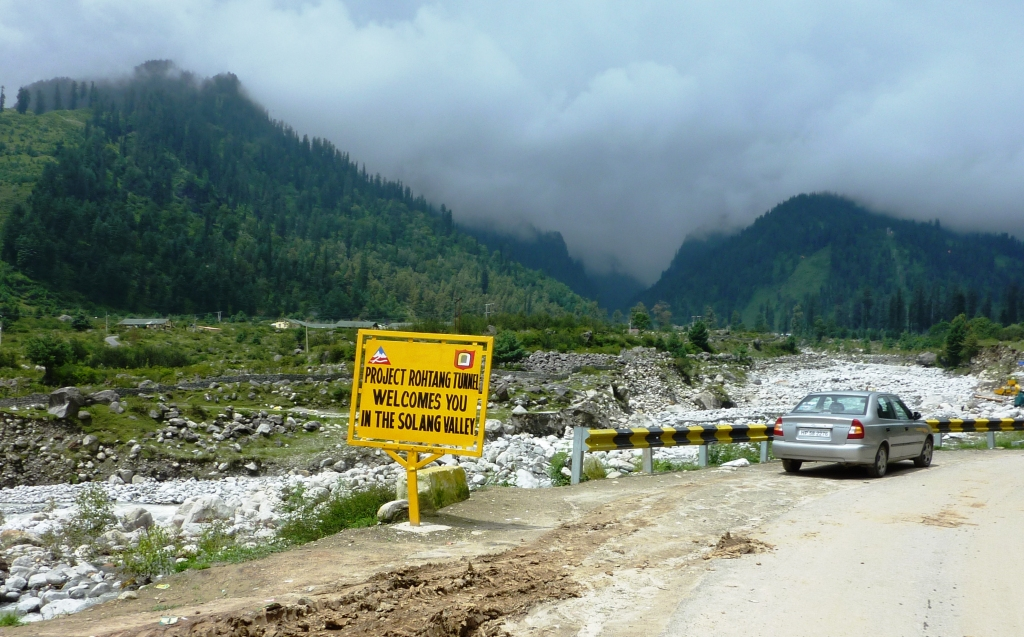
Solang Valley Welcome sign. 2010

Solang Valley derives its name from a combination of the words Solang (Nearby village) and Nallah (water stream). It is a side valley at the top of the Kullu Valley in Himachal Pradesh, India 14 km northwest of the resort town Manali on the way to Rohtang Pass, and is known for its summer and winter sports conditions. The sports most commonly offered are parachuting, paragliding, skating, and zorbing.

The majestic Solang Valley is renowned for its vast slopes of greenery, contributing to its status as a favorite ski resort. The sprawling expanse of lush lawns in the valley has earned it a reputation as a popular destination for skiing enthusiasts. The resort is also known for its world-class ski school and family activities. The village has many shops, including a candy store, which has been featured on Food Network shows. A few ski agencies offering courses and equipment reside here and operate only during winter.

Snow melts during the summer months starting in May and skiing is then replaced by zorbing (a giant ball with room for 2 people which is rolled down a 200-metre hill), paragliding, parachuting, and horse riding.

== Gallery ==
=== Real images of Solang valley ===
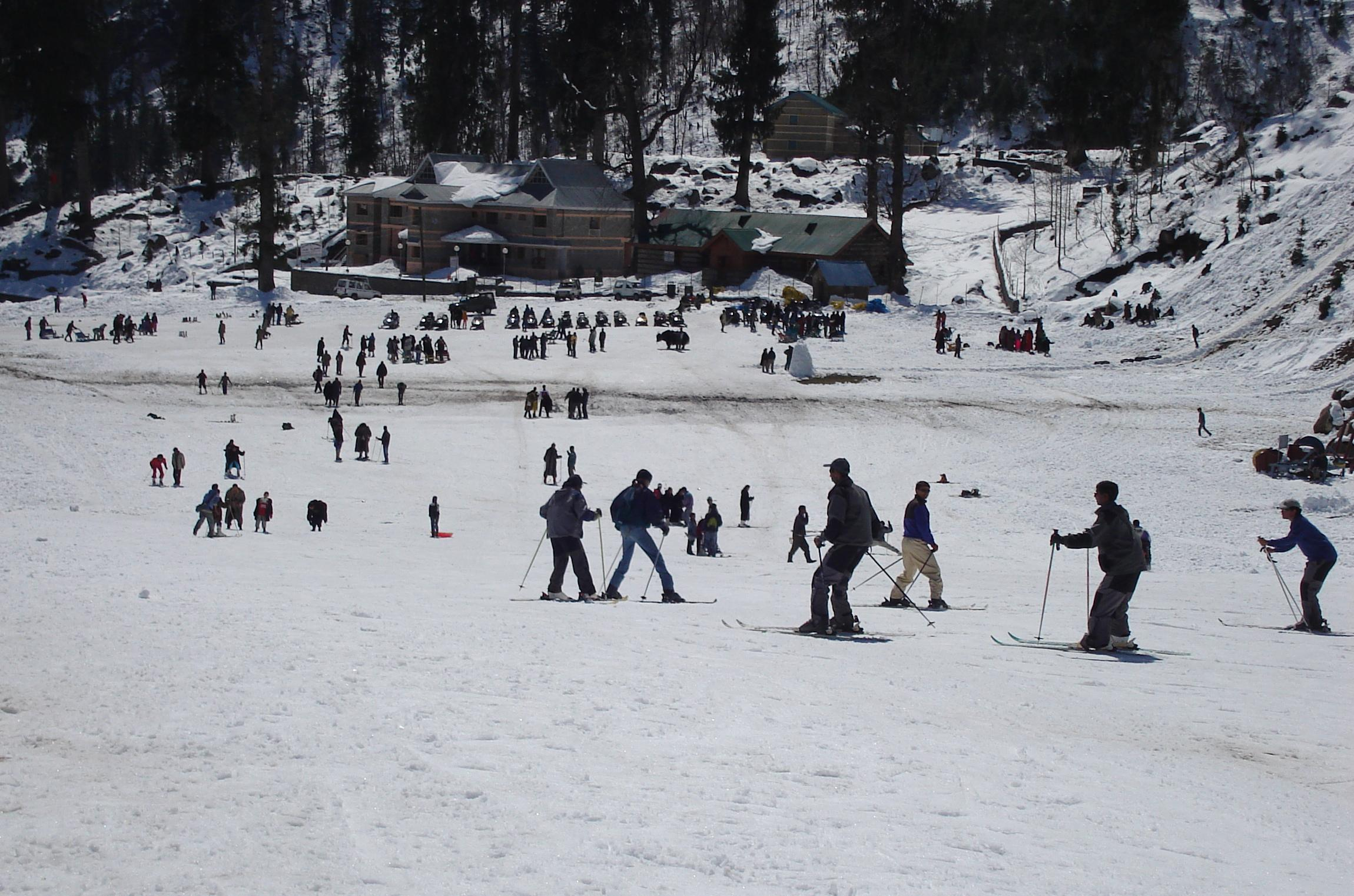

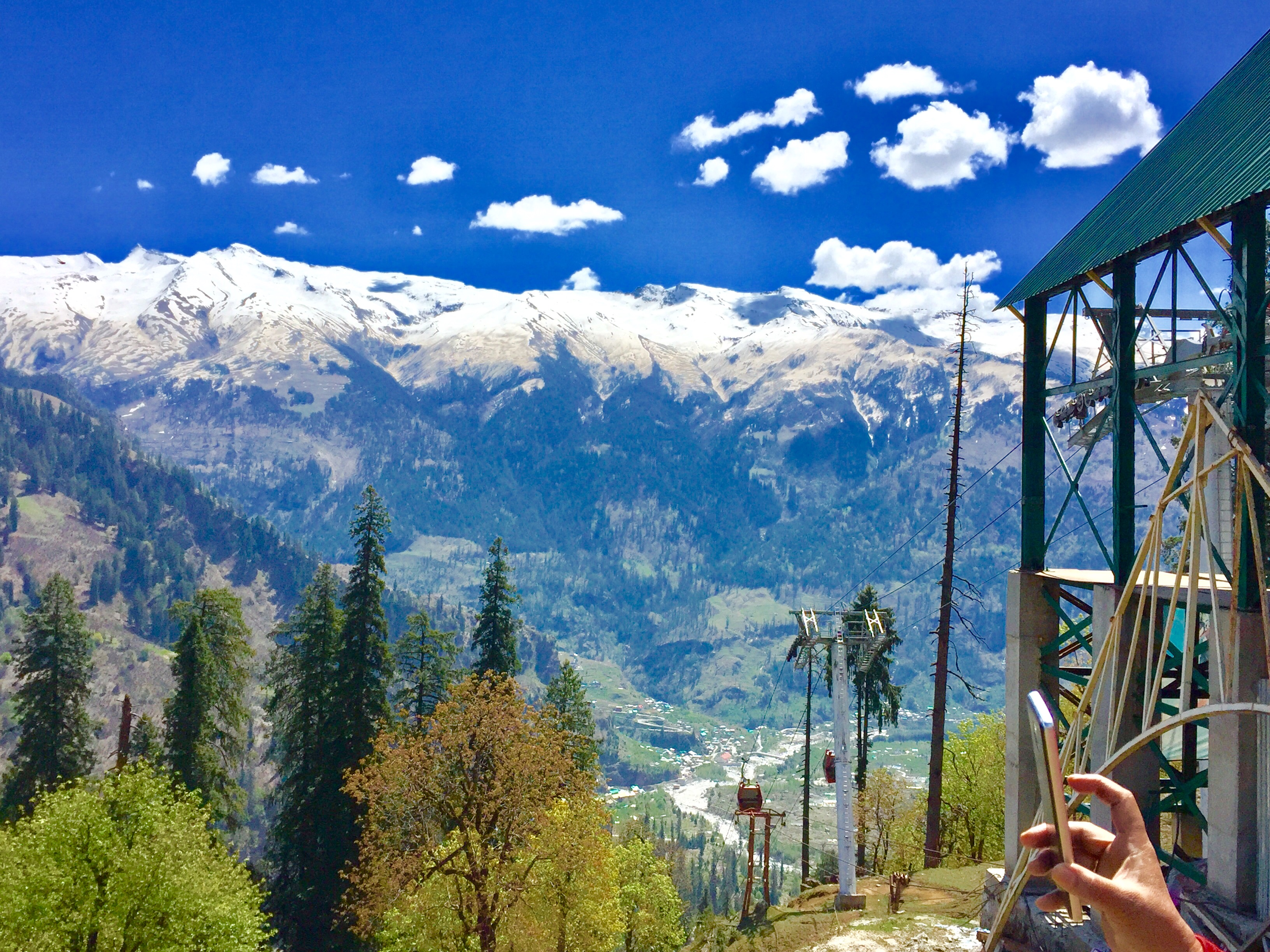

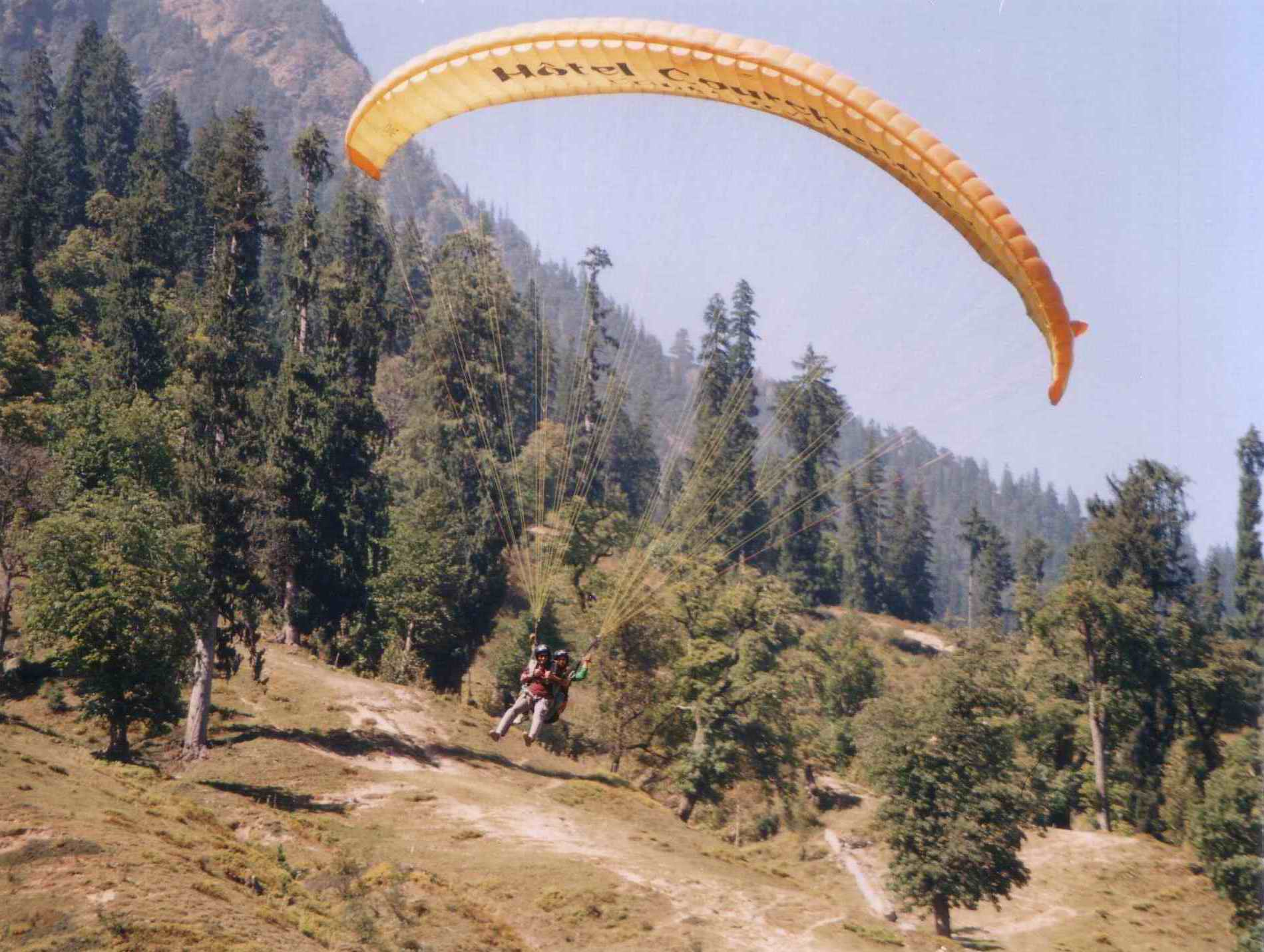

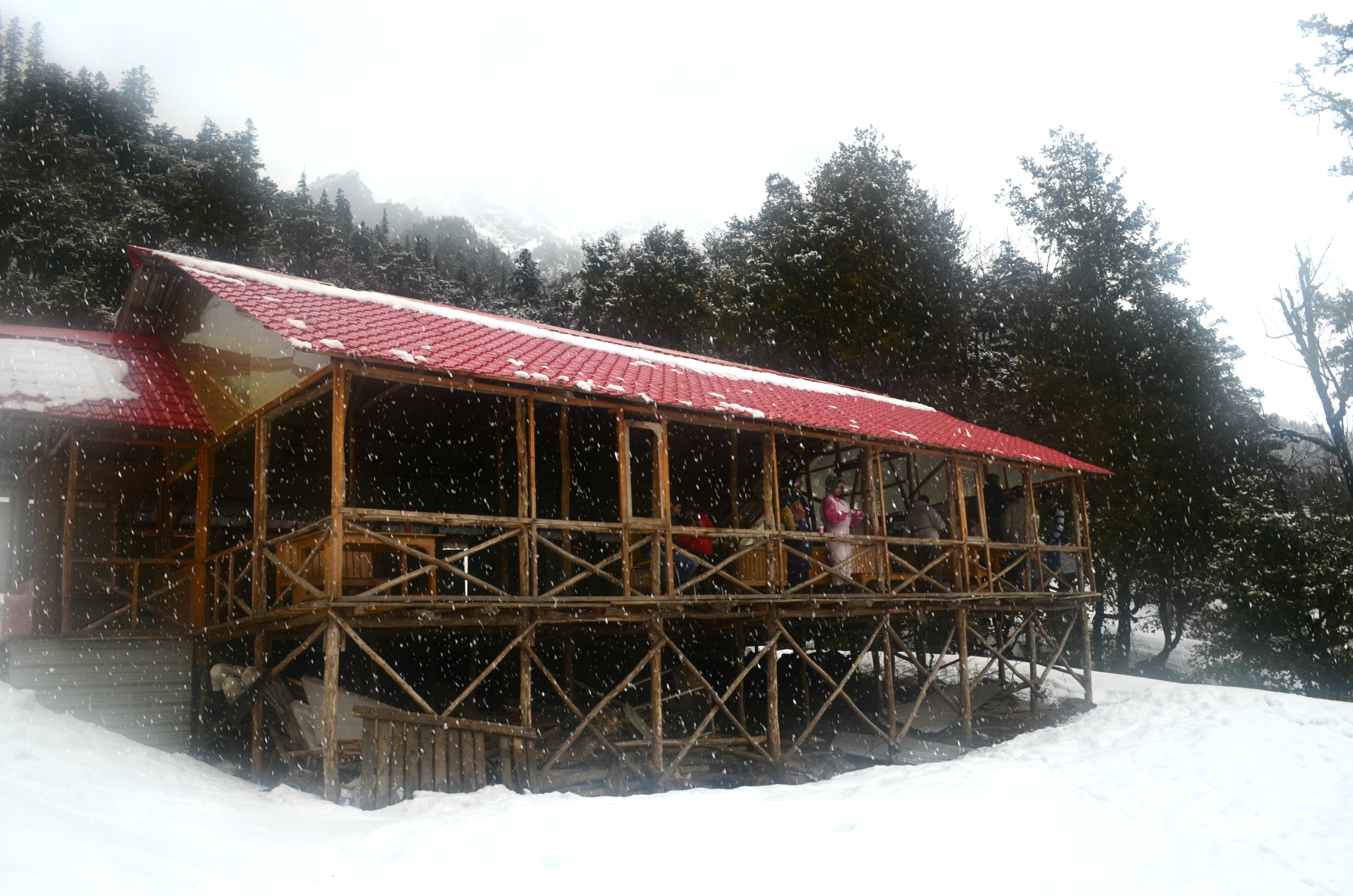

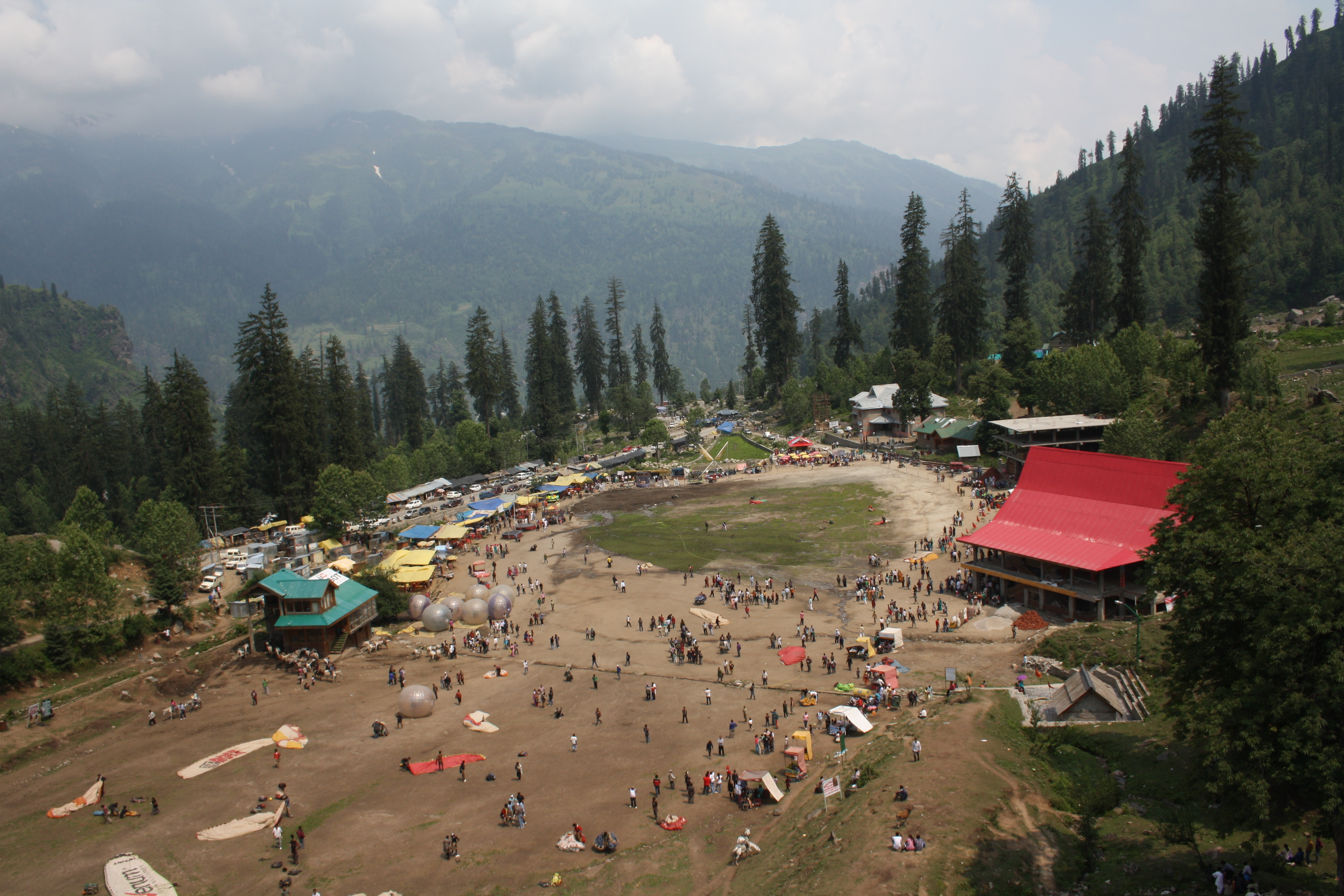

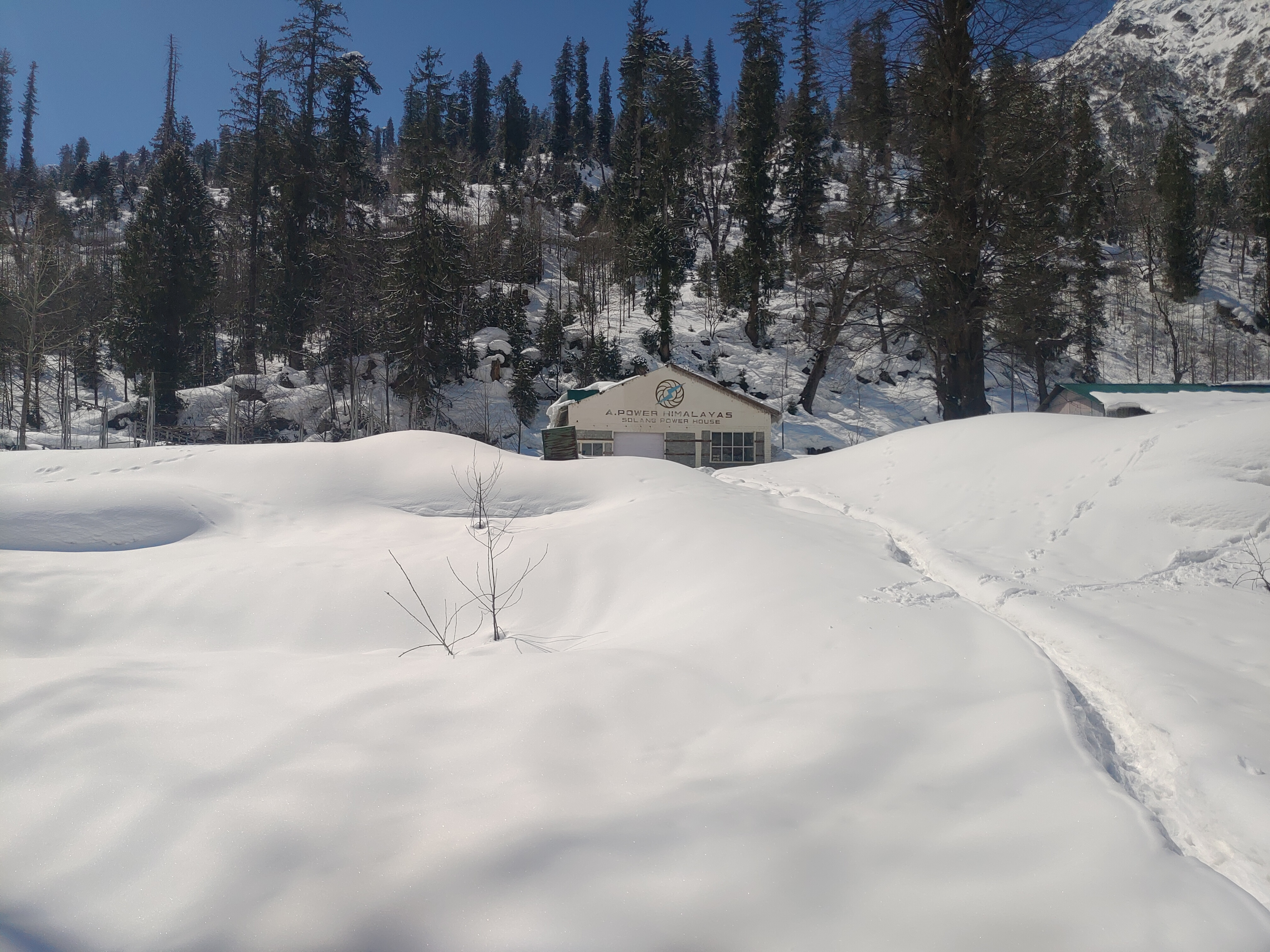
Solang valley Power House

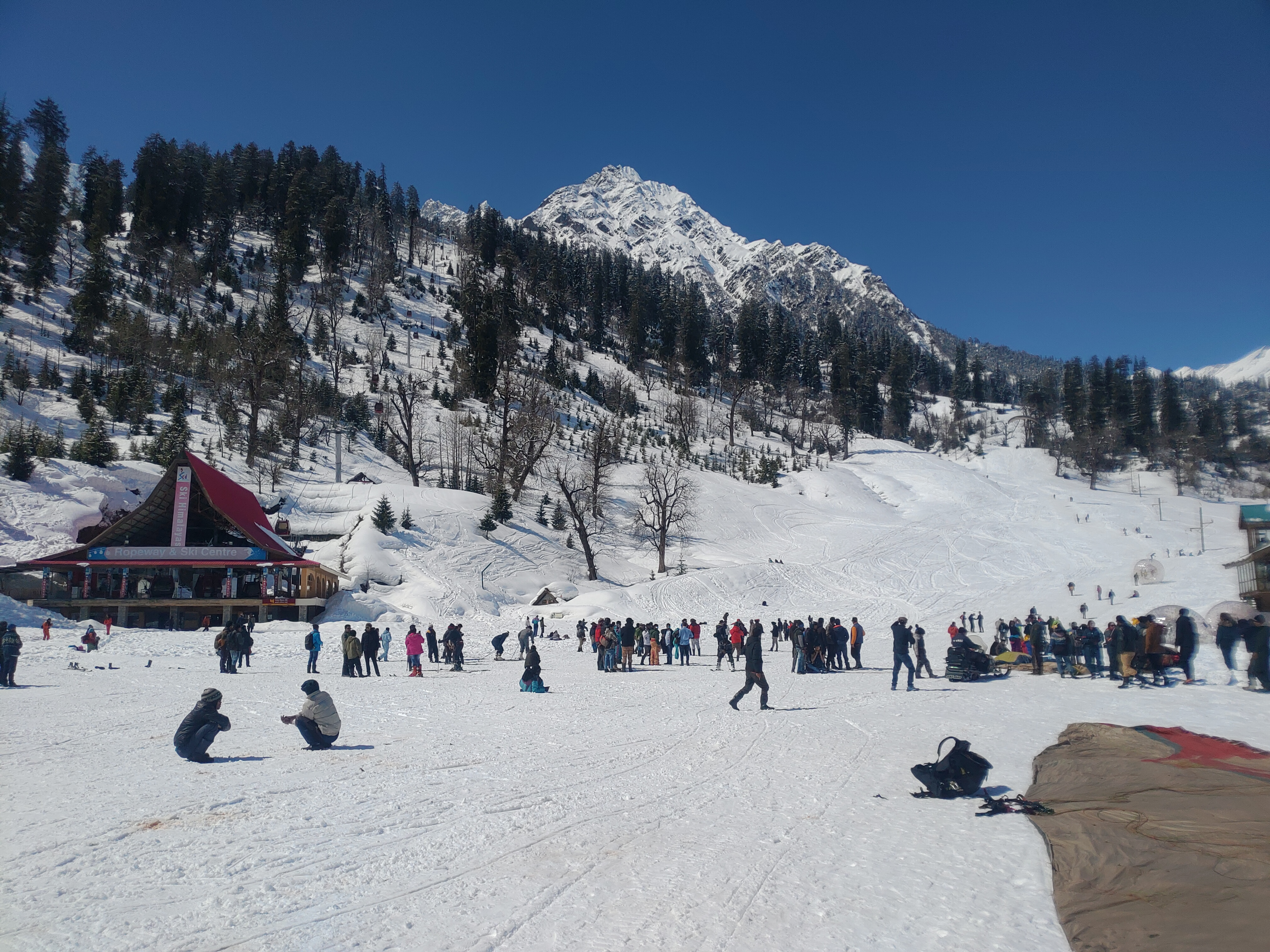
Solang valley Paragliding ground/ropeway (28-02-2019)

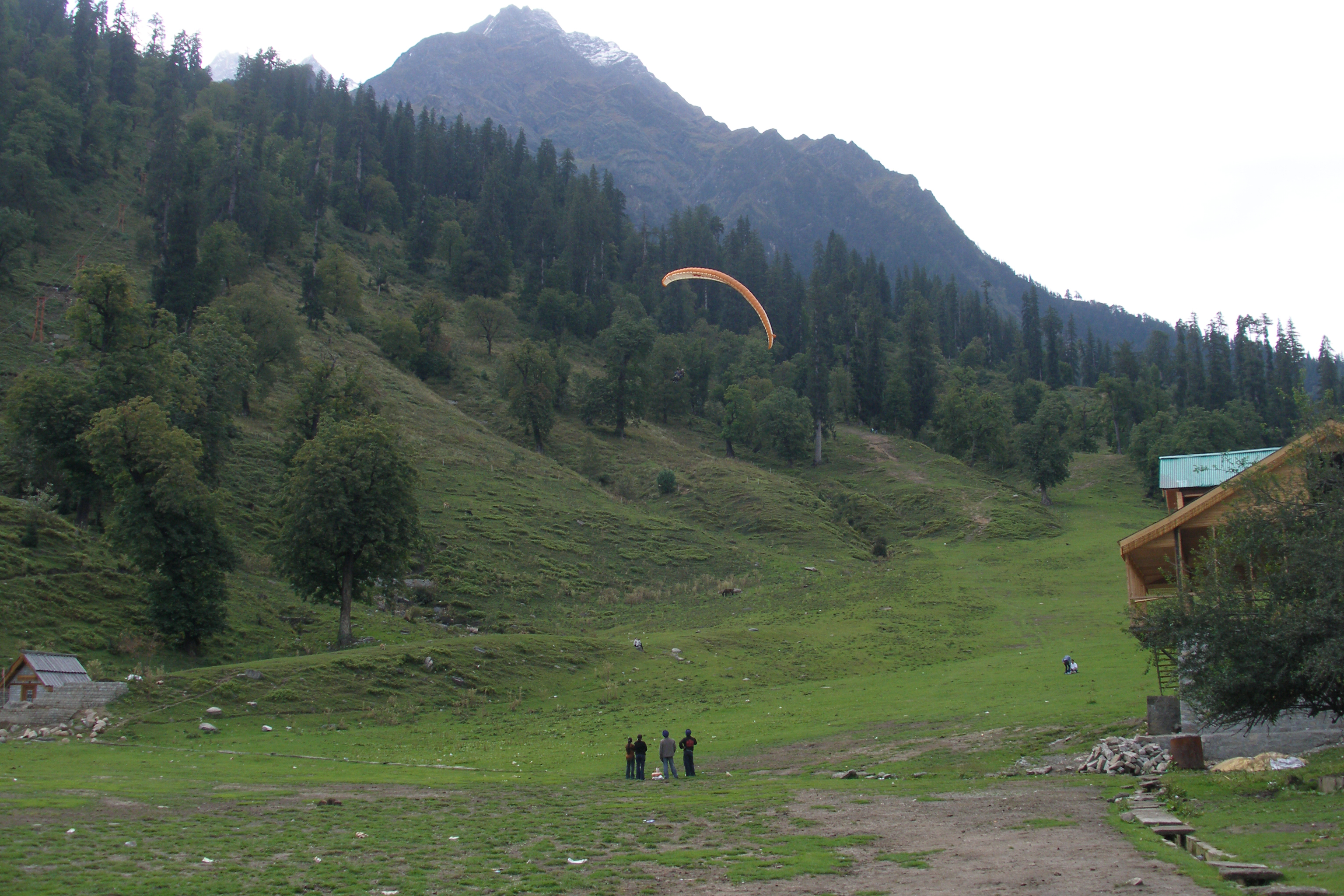

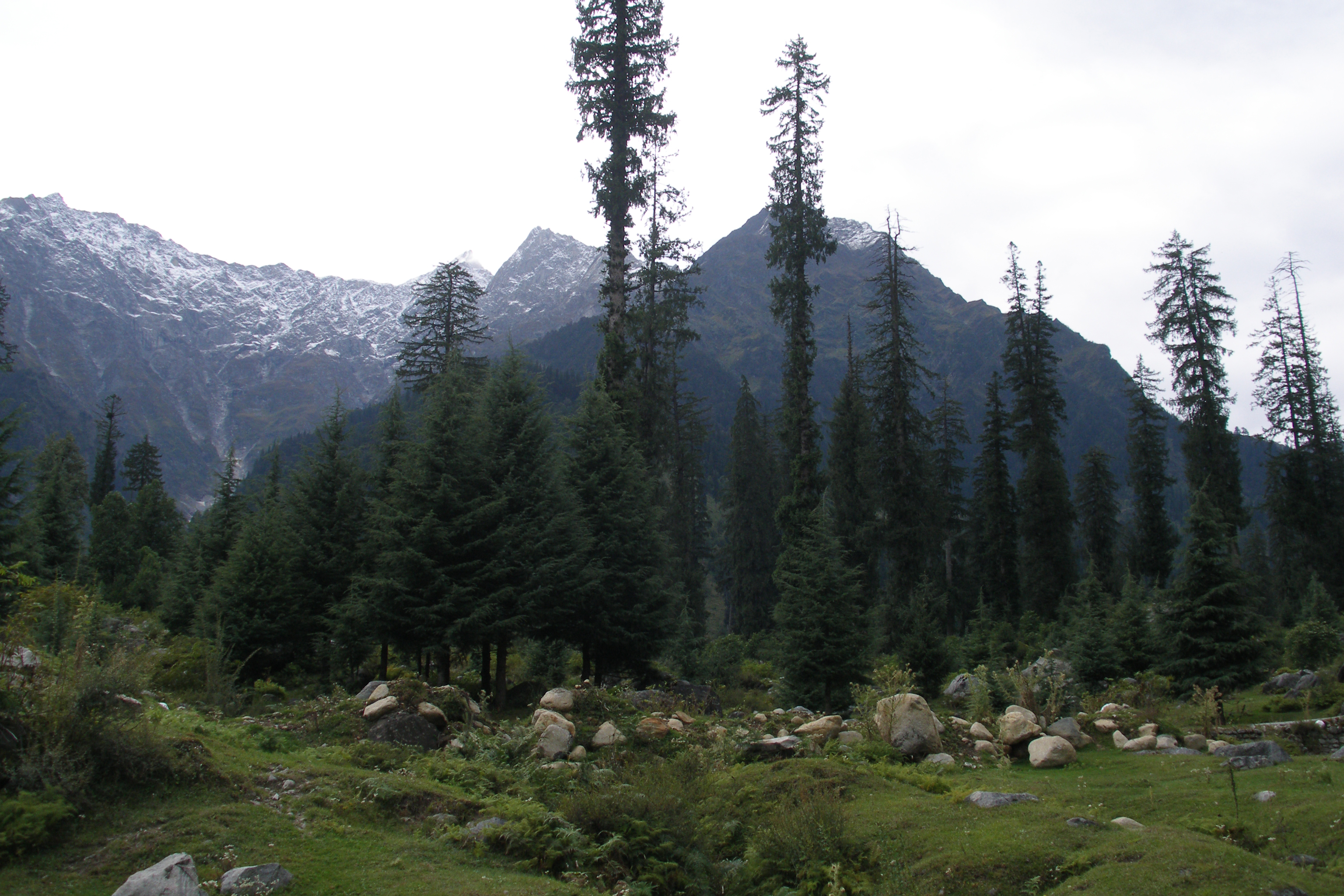

== Climate ==
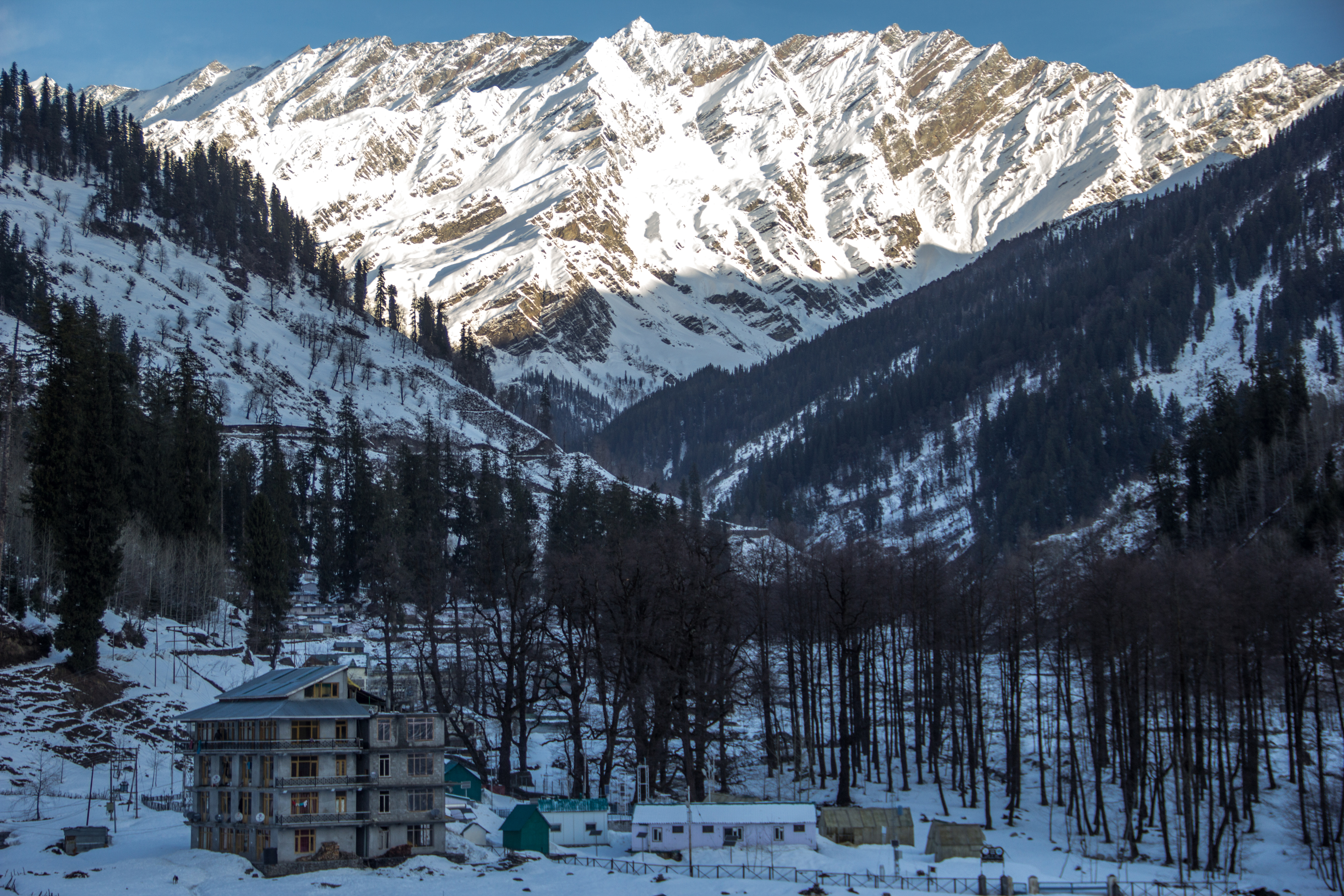
Snowfall in Manali

The climate in Solang Valley is very cold during winter and moderately chilly during summer. The temperatures ranges from −12 °C (10 °F) to 25 °C (77 °F) over the year with the hottest day crossing 25 °C (77 °F) and the coldest day going below −10 °C (14 °F). The average temperature during summer is between 5 °C (41 °F) to 25 °C (77 °F), and between −12 °C (10 °F) to 8 °C (46 °F) in the winter.

Climate data for Solang valley, Record temperatures are from (2018–2019)
Month	Jan	Feb	Mar	Apr	May	Jun	Jul	Aug	Sep	Oct	Nov	Dec	Year
Record high °C (°F)	6.5 (43.7)	6.0 (42.8)	17.0 (62.6)	21.0 (69.8)	25.7 (78.3)	25.8 (78.4)	25.7 (78.3)	24.2 (75.6)	22.1 (71.8)	17.3 (63.1)	12.6 (54.7)	8.8 (47.8)	25.8 (78.4)
Mean daily maximum °C (°F)	1.8 (35.2)	1.8 (35.2)	8.2 (46.8)	17.0 (62.6)	18.0 (64.4)	22 (72)	21.3 (70.3)	20.0 (68.0)	17.5 (63.5)	13.0 (55.4)	7.8 (46.0)	5.0 (41.0)	12.8 (55.0)
Daily mean °C (°F)	−2.0 (28.4)	−1.5 (29.3)	2.7 (36.9)	10.3 (50.5)	11.8 (53.2)	15.3 (59.5)	16.3 (61.3)	15.6 (60.1)	13.3 (55.9)	7.9 (46.2)	3.7 (38.7)	0.9 (33.6)	7.9 (46.1)
Mean daily minimum °C (°F)	−5.8 (21.6)	−4.8 (23.4)	−2.8 (27.0)	3.7 (38.7)	5.6 (42.1)	8.6 (47.5)	11.3 (52.3)	11.3 (52.3)	9.1 (48.4)	2.9 (37.2)	−0.3 (31.5)	−3.2 (26.2)	3.0 (37.4)
Record low °C (°F)	−12.8 (9.0)	−9.0 (15.8)	−6.6 (20.1)	−0.8 (30.6)	3.0 (37.4)	5.5 (41.9)	9.0 (48.2)	8.2 (46.8)	6.2 (43.2)	0.0 (32.0)	−4.6 (23.7)	−10.0 (14.0)	−12.8 (9.0)
Average precipitation mm (inches)	143 (5.6)	130 (5.1)	191 (7.5)	137 (5.4)	121 (4.8)	80 (3.1)	266 (10.5)	239 (9.4)	152 (6.0)	71 (2.8)	31 (1.2)	66 (2.6)	1,627 (64)
Source: SASE (Not enough data to show all time record high and low temperatures)
