= Loomis station (Ilwaco Railway) =

Coordinates: 46°25′30″N 124°03′00″W

Loomis station was a stop on the Ilwaco Railway and Navigation Company's narrow gauge line that ran on the Long Beach Peninsula in Pacific County, Washington, United States from 1889 to 1930. The stop actually consisted of simply the mansion of Lewis A. Loomis, the founder and president of the line. He died in 1913, his mansion fell into disrepair, and the railroad ceased making stops at Loomis. In 1953 the mansion was torn down by a grandson of L.A. Loomis.

The former location of the station is now approximately three blocks south of Loomis Lake State Park.
