= Klipsan Beach Life Saving Station =

- U.S. National Register of Historic Places
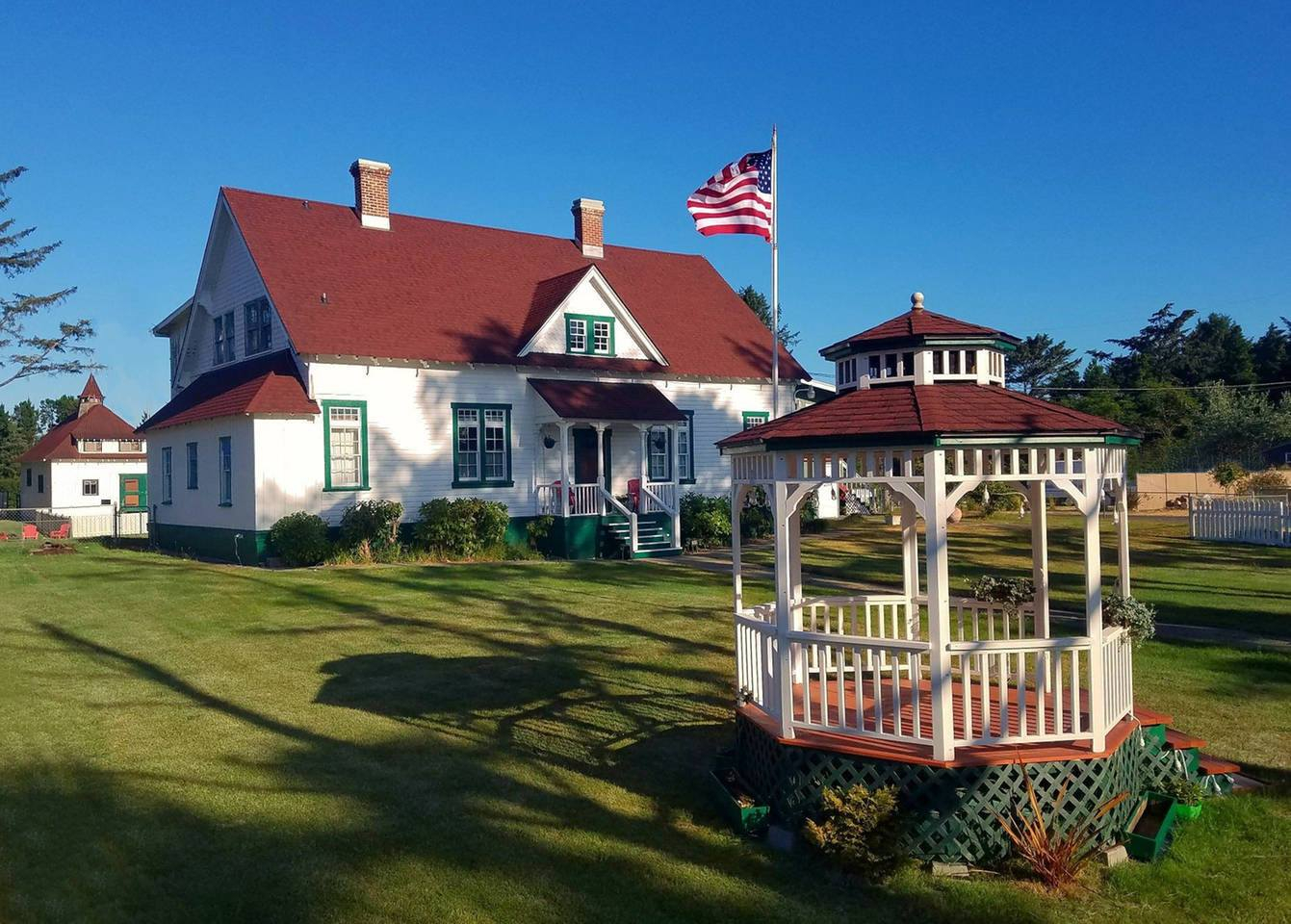
- A photograph of the station in 2017

- Location within Washington (state)
- Location: Klipsan Beach, Washington
- Coordinates: 46°27′52.89″N 124°3′8.77″W
- Built: 1891
- Architect: Arthur B. Bibb
- Architectural style: Marquette-type life-saving station
- NRHP reference No.: 79002546
- Added to NRHP: July 05, 1979

Klipsan Beach was the site of a station of the United States Life-Saving Service. The station buildings still remain, although they are privately owned. The station is on the National Register of Historic Places. The station's name was originally Ilwaco Beach, and only later became known as Klipsan Station. The station was one of several assigned to provide protection in the area known as the Graveyard of the Pacific.

Following the 1915 merger of the U.S. Life-Saving Service and the United States Revenue Cutter Service, the station was designated as Coast Guard Station No. 309. Today, the restored structure operates as a vacation rental property.

== Location ==
On the Long Beach Peninsula, in Pacific County, Washington, about 13 miles (21 km) north of Cape Disappointment.

== Construction and architecture ==
The station was established in 1891. It was built according to the "Marquette" style of life-saving stations, one of a number of standard station designs adopted by the United States Life-Saving Service. This pattern received its name from the station where it was first used, Marquette, Michigan. There were 13 other life-saving Marquette stations, their architect was Albert B. Bibb, and it is speculated that the plans were drawn up in 1889. Other Marquette stations on the West Coast include those at Yaquina Bay, the Umpqua River, Coos Bay, and the Coquille River in Oregon and at Southside, California. The boat house was also built according to a standard United States Life-Saving Service plan, called the "witch's hat" for the design's use of a distinct octagonal ventilator with a conical roof.

- Ilwaco (later Klipsan Beach) Life Saving Station, circa 1895

== Operations ==
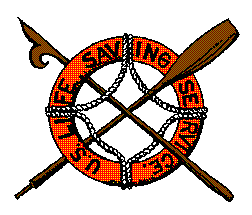
Emblem of the U.S. Life-Saving Service

=== Volunteer operations ===
The station was first started in 1889 on a volunteer basis, and called the Ilwaco Beach station. On November 3, 1891, the ship Strathblane went aground near the station. The volunteer crew was unable to get their lines out to the ship, and seven people died. As a result of this, a decision was made to put the station on a full-time professional basis.

=== Professional keepers ===
Richard Turk was appointed keeper on December 18, 1891, and died on December 2, 1894. William S. Lawrence was appointed keeper on January 4, 1895, and "services dispensed with" on October 9, 1897. George Jorgensen was appointed keeper on November 17, 1897, and transferred to Point Reyes on February 7, 1902. Theodore Conick was appointed keeper on that date and was still serving in 1915. Chief Warrant Officer Joseph Henderson was listed as the Chief Officer in 1929.

=== Equipment ===
The station was equipped with a Dobbins type lifeboat and a McClelland surfboat, which were launched into the surf from a four-wheel hand or horse-drawn carriage. The station was also equipped with a variety of rescue equipment, including the Lyle gun, the breeches buoy, and Coston flares. At times, surfmen rode horses to patrol the beaches The station could call upon the assistance of a seaside railroad, the Ilwaco Railway and Navigation Company, to move rescue boats up and down the beach to get closer to a wreck before launching.

- Wreck of the Alice, with Klipsan Beach life-saving crew launching boat in surf

=== Use of railroad ===
The Ilwaco Railway and Navigation Company railroad also took the crew of the station to wherever a vessel might have stranded on the beach along the line. Occasional special runs were made to bring on-lookers to a wreck site, and weekly excursions were made to take vacationers to watch the lifeboat rescue drills at the Klipsan Beach Station. L.A. Loomis was closely involved with the establishment of the life-saving station near to the railway line, which ran along the eastern boundary of the proposed station property. Loomis promised a siding along the northern boundary to the boathouse overlooking the ocean. A flatcar was placed there to allow transport of rescue crews and boats to points along the beach.

The railroad was used in at least one rescue, on December 19, 1896, when the German bark Potrimpos drifted ashore seven miles south of the life-saving station. The horse-drawn lifeboat was not able to get down the beach, but the railroad transported a life boat and crew to the scene of the wreck, where fourteen men were still aboard. The lifeboat was launched, and all the men were saved. A special train also brought up the life-saving crew from the next south station, Cape Disappointment, but by the time they arrive, all the men had been taken off the stricken bark.

The tracks were so close to the life-saving station that surfmen and their children could and did pose for photographs on the crude platform at the station, with the rails in foreground and the station clearly shown in the background.

- Wreck of the Alice, with Klipsan Beach life-saving crew launching boat in surf
- Ilwaco (later Klipsan Beach) Life Saving Station, circa 1895
- wreck of the Potrimpos

=== Wrecks along the North Beach ===
A partial listing of wrecks along the North Beach (that is, the ocean side of the Long Beach Peninsula) during the station's operation includes, running from north to south on the beach:

- schooner Solano, February 5, 1907
- Glenmorag, March 19, 1896
- Caoba, February 5, 1925
- bark Alfa, September 19, 1924
- Alice, January 15, 1909
- Lenore, April 10, 1917
- Strathblane, November 3, 1891
- Artemsia, 1889
- C.A. Klose (or Close), March 26, 1905
- bark Potrimpos, December 19, 1896
- steamer Point Loma, February 28, 1896
- schooner Frank W. Howe, February 22, 1904

== The station now ==
Although the shoreline has shifted over the past century, the core station buildings remain intact. A historic photo from the beach during active operations shows the sand extending to the station's original boathouse and watchtower; today, the ocean lies farther west, but the main station structure and other elements of the complex remain and are under private ownership.

As of the 2020s, the restored main station operates as a vacation rental property. The building retains much of its historic exterior and architectural character, including features associated with the original Marquette-style design.
