= Gumelemi Cay =

- Location within Bahamas

Geography
- Location: Atlantic Ocean
- Coordinates: 26°40′N 77°07′W
- Type: Cay
- Archipelago: Lucayan Archipelago

Administration
- Bahamas

Gumelemi Cay is a tiny island directly north of the Baker's Bay tip of Great Guana Cay in The Bahamas. The island is a sea turtle nesting ground. Loggerhead sea turtles, hawksbill sea turtles and green sea turtles nest on the 2-acre (8,100 m^{2}) island.

Baker's Bay Golf & Ocean Club, which owns the island and the 600 acres (2.4 km^{2}) adjacent to it, plans to develop the acreage into six lots, despite opposition from Jean-Michel Cousteau's Ocean Futures Society, Caribbean Conservation Corps and the Archie Carr Center.
