= Baker's Bay =

Body of water in the Bahamas

- Location within Bahamas Location within the Caribbean
- Coordinates: 26°41′20″N 77°09′20″W
- Basin countries: Bahamas
- Max. length: 5 kilometres (3.1 mi)

Baker's Bay is a three-mile long bay on the island of Great Guana Cay. A clear and aqua sea grass bed in the Sea of Abaco, it was a favorite destination of Abaco Islands boaters for years.

== Flora and fauna ==
Baker's Bay is home to foraging and nesting sea turtles of up to five species including the Jamaican slider (Trachemys terrapen), the Green sea turtle (Chelonia mydas), the Loggerhead sea turtle (Caretta caretta). It is also home to a wide variety of sharks and large fish. Baker's Bay is created by two mangrove rivers from the island, which are important estuaries for the island's coral reef.

== Environmental issues ==
Dredging for a private Premier Cruise Line Resort caused considerable environmental damage to the corals in the area, as corals are unable to withstand continuous silting.

== Golf club controversy ==
Baker's Bay and Gumelemi Cay are the location of the Baker's Bay Golf & Ocean Club, as well as the controversy surrounding it. In 2004, the Discovery Land Company began the megadevelopment project, which is largely believed by conservation groups to have destroyed the area. Three independent scientists believe the coral reef will be destroyed by the construction of a golf course, marina and development structures. Despite these concerns, construction on the golf course began in 2006 and was completed and opened in 2012.
