= Baker's Bay Golf & Ocean Club =

Coordinates: 26.678°N 77.129°W

Location of Great Guana Cay within the Bahamas

Baker's Bay Golf & Ocean Club is a private resort community in the Northeastern Bahamas. The development is located near Baker's Bay in Great Guana Cay situated between the Sea of Abaco and the Atlantic Ocean. The 585-acre (2.37 km^{2}) project is a resort development of 385 homes. Developed by Discovery Land Company, the project will include a Tom Fazio-designed 18 hole golf course, 200-slip marina, Marina Village resort area, and a private club that includes beach club and spa.

The golf course is notable for its very relaxed dress code, which permits and even encourages golfers to play barefoot.

== Lawsuits ==
The majority of Great Guana Cay residents have taken Baker's Bay Club to court. A group of residents, supported by the coral reef conservation community, believe the development will destroy their coral reef.

Seventy five of the ninety one Bahamians on Great Guana Cay oppose Baker's Bay Club over the subject of whether the central government of the Bahamas has the right to offer public land to foreign developers at the expense of Bahamian use and preservation of the land.

The initial lawsuit by Save Guana Cay Reef lost in the Supreme Court after the developer halted development for several months.

In a Freeport Tribune article, attorney Fred Smith was quoted, "We believe we have a very strong case, and have been denied due process. The issue of the ability of the Prime Minister to bind the country as to Heads of Agreement will be determined at the highest level… for the future development of the Bahamas, these are matters which are of fundamental importance."

In 2006, Jean-Michel Cousteau stated in a letter to the Prime Minister, "...the Bakers Bay Golf and Ocean Club development on Great Guana Cay may undermine the environmental health of the region; specifically affecting the nesting sea turtles of Gumelemi Cay and to the north, and impacting the neighboring reefs adjacent to the proposed golf course."

Despite these lawsuits, construction on the golf resort began in 2006 and was completed and opened in 2012.
