= Great Guana Cay =

Island in The Bahamas

- Location within Bahamas

Geography
- Location: Atlantic Ocean
- Coordinates: 26.678°N 77.129°W
- Type: Cay
- Archipelago: Lucayan Archipelago

Administration
- Bahamas

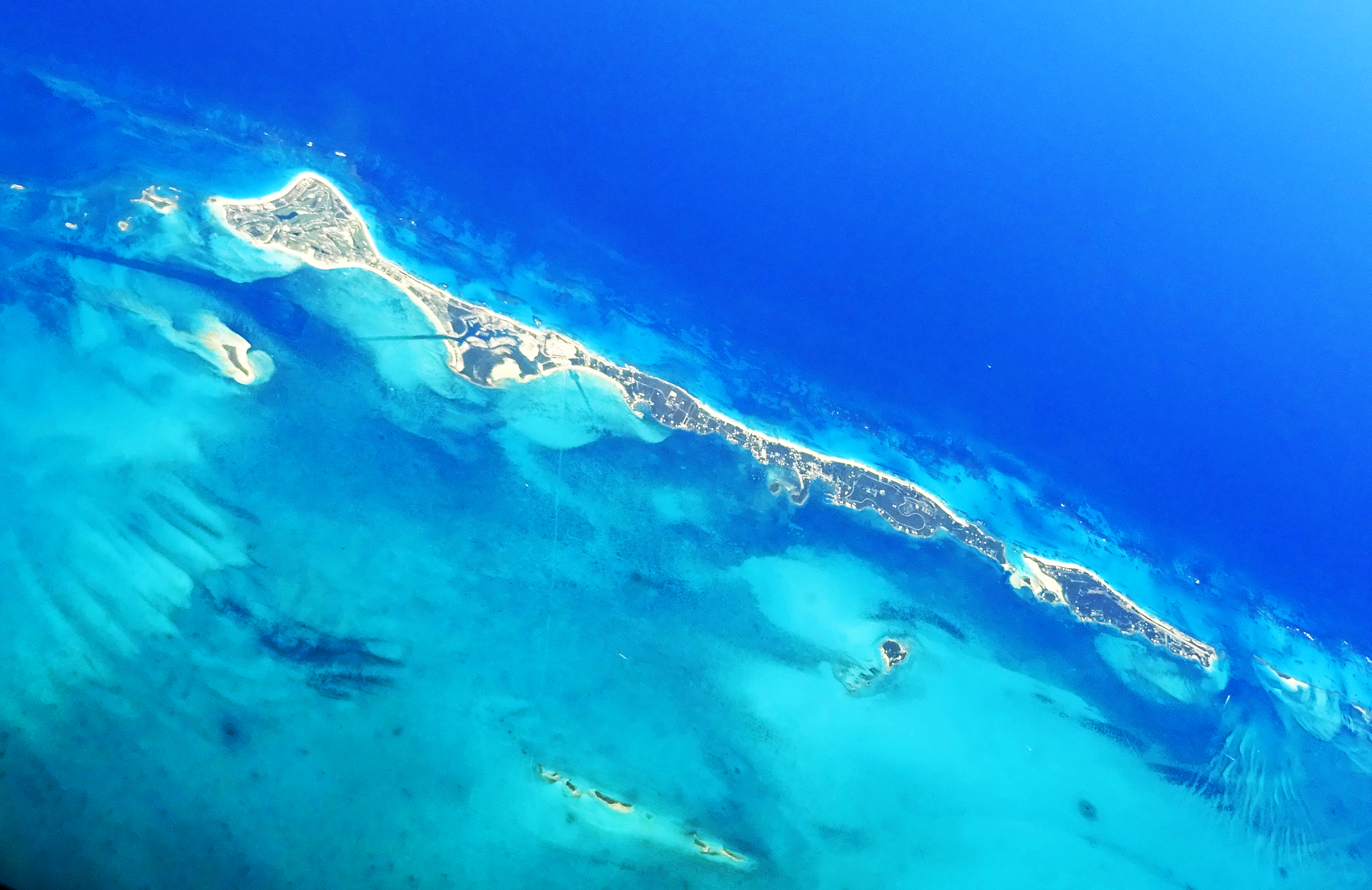
Great Guana Cay and Scotland Cay from aeroplane

Great Guana Cay is an islet in the Abaco Islands of the Bahamas. It is narrow and measures about 7 miles (11 km) long. It is in the centre of the Abaco Islands and near Gumelemi Cay. It is about 8 miles from Marsh Harbour. Approximately 150 people live on the island, mostly along the five and a half mile long stretch of beach.

Great Guana Cay's settlement is known for its loyalist culture and architecture, as well as its social scene. Several traditional loyalist homes are in the settlement, which wraps around a natural harbor.

== Overview ==
Great Guana Cay is an Abaco barrier island that hosts elkhorn and staghorn coral reefs. It also contains a large amount of virgin forest, where migrating birds and resident Abaco species live. Loggerhead sea turtles, green sea turtles and hawksbill sea turtles nest on the island's beaches. Both white-crowned pigeons and white-tailed tropicbirds nest on the island. Before removal of the crabbing-ground mangroves by a golf development, land crabs such as mountain crabs were common and were hunted for food by the native population.

A cove on the island called Kidd's Cove was named after the pirate William Kidd.

== Baker's Bay controversy ==
Great Guana Cay came to international attention in conservation circles when the residents of the island grouped to form Save Guana Cay Reef, an organization designed to fight the large footprint of the Baker's Bay Golf & Ocean Club, located at Baker's Bay. Jean-Michel Cousteau's Ocean Futures Society, the Sierra Club, Greenpeace, Global Coral Reef Alliance, Mangrove Action Network and other conservation groups worked with the native islanders in a battle against the golf resort, which they say will destroy the island's mangroves and coral reef.

Despite these attempts at stopping the golf resort, construction began in 2006. In 2012, a large portion of the originally planned golf resort was completed and opened.
