= Sea of Abaco =

Lagoon in the Bahamas

- Abaco Sound
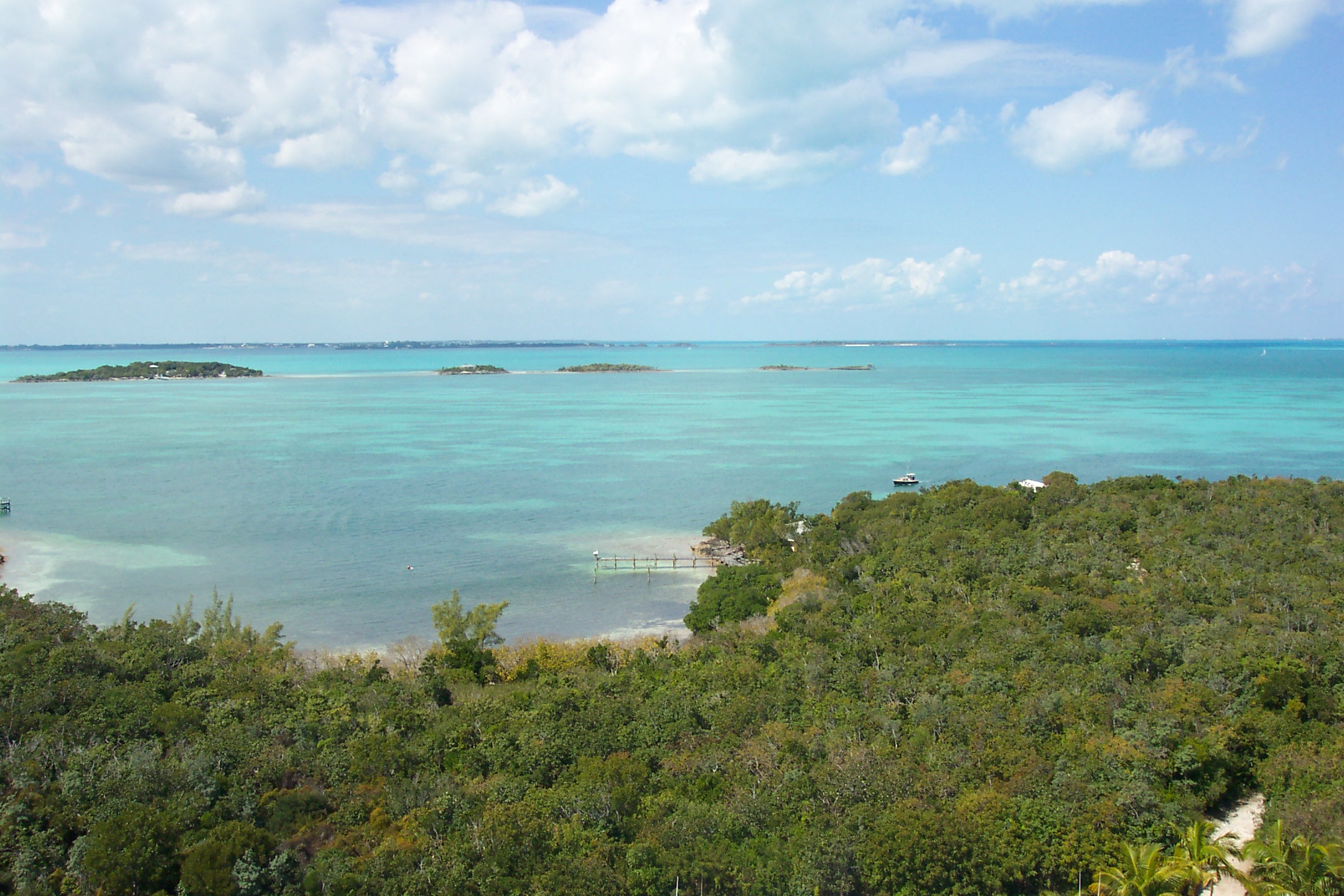
- Sea of Abaco seen from Hope Town

- Location within Bahamas Location within the Caribbean
- Coordinates: 26°37′41″N 77°08′34″W
- Basin countries: Bahamas
- Max. length: 100 kilometres (62 mi)

The Sea of Abaco (sometimes Abaco Sound), located in The Bahamas, is an approximately 100 kilometres (62 miles) long saltwater lagoon separating Great Abaco Island (known locally as the 'mainland') from a chain of barrier islands known as the Abaco Cays. Depths in the Sea of Abaco are generally a few metres, and shallow reefs and shoals can pose a serious hazard to navigation. Despite these hazards, the sea is popular with boaters and is sometimes referred to as a 'marine highway', offering a sheltered passage through the Abaco Islands. The majority of the largest settlements and towns in the Abaco Islands are located along the shores of the sea.

== Geography ==
The northernmost limit of the Sea of Abaco is generally depicted on most modern navigational charts, such as Jeppesen's C-Map Charts, as being south of the Hog Cays, between Crab Cay and Spanish Cay. From Spanish Cay south to Little Harbour (the southernmost limit), the Sea of Abaco forms a lagoon flanked to the east by the Abaco Cays and the Great Abaco Barrier Reef. To the west it is bordered by Great Abaco Island, which forms a nautically impassable barrier for its entire length. Navigable channels between some of the individual Abaco Cays provide access to the Atlantic Ocean.

North of the town of Marsh Harbour the orientation of the sea is generally northwest to southeast. South of Marsh Harbour the orientation is north to south. The widest part of the sea can be found just to the northwest of Marsh Harbour, where the width of the sea separating the barrier cays from Great Abaco Island exceeds 10 kilometres (6 miles).

Notable cays within the sea include the Parrot Cays, Sand Bank Cays, and Fish Cays. The area around the Sand Bank Cays, between Treasure Cay and Whale Cay, is notoriously treacherous to navigation due to breaking shoals and relatively shallow water. Vessels with a draft greater than 1.2 metres (4 feet) are usually warned to avoid this area.

Paper nautical charts which cover the Sea of Abaco include NGA Chart 26321 Hope Town Approaches and NGA Chart 26300 Little Bahama Bank to Eleuthera Island.

== Environment ==
The Sea of Abaco, unlike many continental lagoon systems, is completely saline. None of the islands which border it contribute appreciable quantities of surface runoff, which is part of the reason why its waters are extremely clear. Coastal mangroves are abundant along the islands which border the sea, and marine life is relatively diverse. The Sea of Abaco is partly fringed by what is sometimes considered to be the third largest barrier reef system on Earth, the Great Abaco Barrier Reef. This reef is considered particularly impressive due to the presence of large stands of staghorn and elkhorn coral. By one account, the largest stand of elkhorn coral in the world is located within the Sea of Abaco, near Sandy Cay, south of Man-O-War Cay.

In terms of its physical environment, the Sea of Abaco has earned a reputation for a phenomenon known as “Abaco Rage”. Beyond the eastern edge of the sea, in the Atlantic Ocean, the seafloor drops off rapidly, generally deepening more than 200 metres (650 feet) over a distance of only a few kilometres. As swells from the ocean move west towards the Sea of Abaco, the sudden shallowness can cause the swells to slow down and pile up, building into large waves. For small vessels, the ensuing Abaco Rage can sometimes make navigation extremely difficult in the shallow channels between the Abaco Cays. Weather is very welcoming.

== Geology ==
The Sea of Abaco sits atop the Little Bahama Bank, a massive carbonate platform built up from the remains of millions of years of marine organisms, including corals and foraminifera. It is enclosed by the islands of the Abacos, which are composed of sand dune systems that have been partly lithified due to the cementation of their calcium carbonate sands. Where sand dunes have been transformed to rock, the resulting material is referred to as eolianite. The coastal cliffs and ridges of Great Abaco Island, which fringe the sea, are composed of this material.
