= Family Travel Forum =

Internet forum

The Family Travel Forum is an Internet forum for travelers, focusing on families with children. Of the registered members, 75% are women with children.

The American media company Family Travel Forum Inc. owns the forum, which publishes both print and online travel guides where travel experts and registered members may post trip ideas and advice. The travel website, FamilyTravelForum.com, includes reviews and information on vacation destinations. The site received Travel Weekly's 2009 Magellan Award for Excellence in Online Travel Guides.

== History ==
Kemmons Wilson, who founded the Holiday Inn brand in 1952, is credited with starting "family travel" as a hotel concept after a road trip in which motels charged him $2 per head per night for his five children. The Holiday Inn was one of the first hotels to include perks such as children sleep free, free parking, ice machines, and phones in the room. Two years earlier, Delta Air Lines had instituted a "Family Plan" allowing children under 2 years old to fly free with their parents. In the same year, American Airlines and Northeast Airlines allowed mothers and children to pay half the fare when traveling with their father mid-week, while TWA advertised that their air hostesses were trained to help mothers with their babies, who flew free of charge.

According to IATA, since 1956, standardized children and infant fares for international travel have meant that one infant less than two years of age not occupying a seat pays 10% of the adult fare as a "lap child." Children under 12 years old in their own seat paid a "child's fare" that started at 50% of the adult fare in 1956, and had grown to between 67% and 100% of the full adult fare by 2003.

Today, the U.S. Travel Association defines "family travel" to include many types of traveling parties, including married couples traveling together, spouses traveling with children, grandparents traveling with grandchildren, single parents with children, reunion-goers, and siblings with relatives. According to Ypartnership's National Leisure Travel Monitor, the percentage of adults traveling with their own children increased from 26% in 2000 to 38% in 2008.

The 2010 Portrait of American Travelers published that nearly 50% of leisure travelers had taken one trip with children in the past 12 months, and that 41% had taken an average of 2.5 trips. It found that members of Generation X (born between 1965 and 1978) are twice as likely to travel with children as any other demographic. About 28% of leisure travelers were grandparents, and 32% of them had travelled with children in the past 12 months. More than 89% of these travelers researched their vacations online, and more than 87% booked them online.

The Family Travel Forum started publishing travel advice in 1996. The FTF consulting division has worked with Fairmont Hotels, Chrysler, Forbes, and the Finland Ministry of Tourism. FTF has licensed content to various companies including, among others, hotel, parenting and travel websites such as Travelocity, Discovery Channel, and Disney Family.com.

== Awards and recognition ==
- Conde Nast Traveler "50 Essential Web Sites" (2000)
- National Parenting Center Seal of Approval (2000, 2003, 2005)
- Forbes Best of the Web (2001, 2002, 2003)
- Web Marketing Association Webaward (2005)
- Travel Weekly Magellan Award, Online Travel Guides (2008, 2009)
- Recommended in The 4-Hour Workweek by Tim Ferriss (2009)
