= Washington State Route 103 =

State highway in Pacific County, Washington, US

State Route 103
- SR 103 highlighted in red

Route information
- Auxiliary route of US 101
- Maintained by WSDOT
- Length: 19.97 mi (32.14 km)
- Existed: 1964–present
- Tourist routes: Lewis and Clark Trail

Major junctions
- South end: US 101 in Seaview
- North end: Leadbetter Point State Park

Location
- Country: United States
- State: Washington
- County: Pacific

Highway system
- State highways in Washington; Interstate; US; State; Scenic; Pre-1964; 1964 renumbering; Former
← SR 102	→ SR 104

State Route 103 (SR 103) is a 19.97-mile-long (32.14 km) state highway serving the Long Beach Peninsula, located within Pacific County in the U.S. state of Washington. The highway travels north from U.S. Route 101 (US 101) in Seaview through Long Beach and Ocean Park to the southern entrance of Leadbetter Point State Park. SR 103 was created in the 1964 highway renumbering, replacing the earlier Secondary State Highway 12A (SSH 12A) that was created in 1937 to serve Long Beach and Ocean Park, later extended north in 1991 to serve Leadbetter Point State Park.

== Route description ==
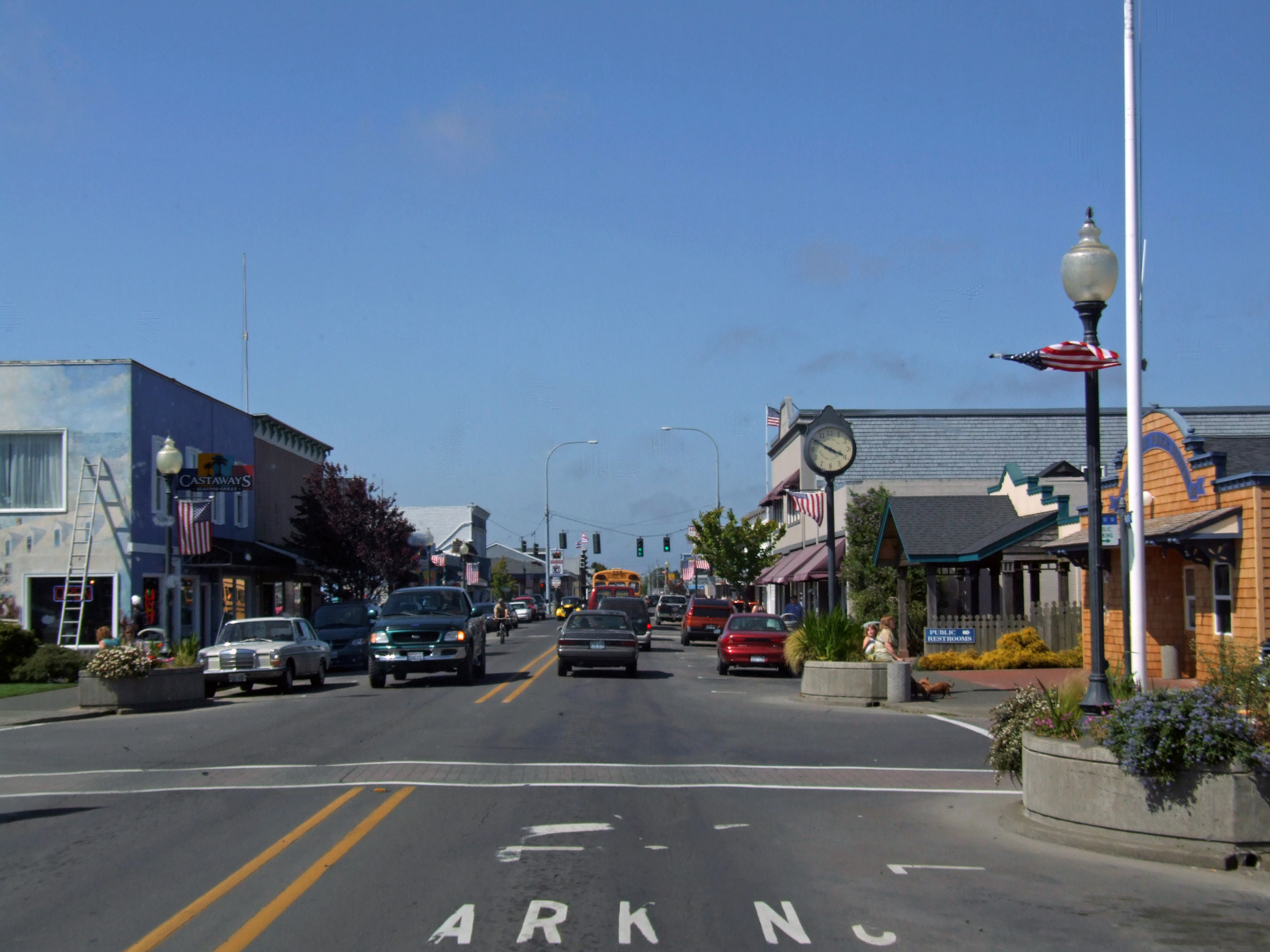
SR 103 traveling north through Downtown Long Beach as Pacific Avenue.

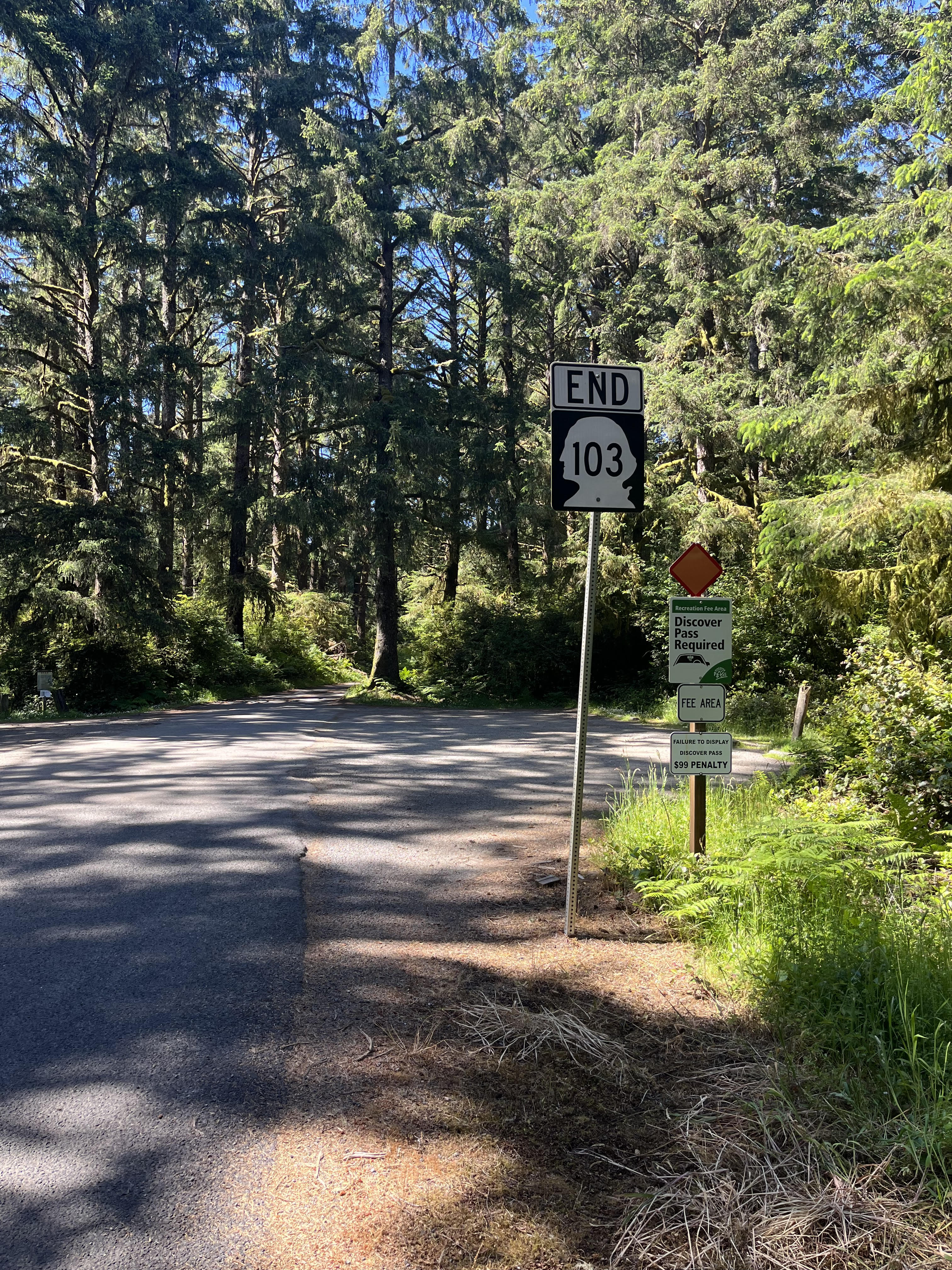
Northern Terminus of SR 103 at Leadbetter Point State Park

SR 103 begins as Pacific Way at an intersection with 40th Street, signed as US 101, in Seaview. The highway travels north through the city of Long Beach as Pacific Avenue and enters rural Pacific County on the coast of the Pacific Ocean, passing Briscoe Lake and Loomis Lake. SR 103 travels through Oceanside and Ocean Park, turning east onto Bay Avenue towards Willapa Bay, before continuing north on Sandridge Road through Nahcotta and Oysterville. The highway turns northwest onto Stackpole Road and ends at the southern entrance of Leadbetter Point State Park, west of Stackpole Harbor.

Every year, the Washington State Department of Transportation (WSDOT) conducts a series of surveys on its highways in the state to measure traffic volume. This is expressed in terms of annual average daily traffic (AADT), which is a measure of traffic volume for any average day of the year. In 2011, WSDOT calculated that the busiest section of the highway was at 10th Street in Downtown Long Beach, serving 7,900 vehicles, while the least busiest section was the entrance to Leadbetter Point State Park, serving 270 vehicles.

== History ==
SSH 12A was established in 1937 during the creation of the primary and secondary state highway system, traveling north from US 101 in Seaview through Long Beach to Ocean Park. During the 1964 highway renumbering, SR 103 replaced SSH 12A on its 11.09-mile-long (17.85 km) route, serving the Long Beach Peninsula. SR 103 was extended further north to serve Leadbetter Point State Park in 1991, increasing the total distance of the highway to the current 19.97-mile-long (32.14 km) route.

== Major intersections ==
The entire highway is in Pacific County.

Location	mi	km	Destinations	Notes
Seaview	0.00	0.00	US 101 – Ilwaco, Raymond, Longview	Southern terminus
Leadbetter Point State Park	19.97	32.14	Park entrance	Northern terminus
1.000 mi = 1.609 km; 1.000 km = 0.621 mi
