= Washington Corrections Center =

Men's prison in Shelton, Washington

Washington Corrections Center (WCC)
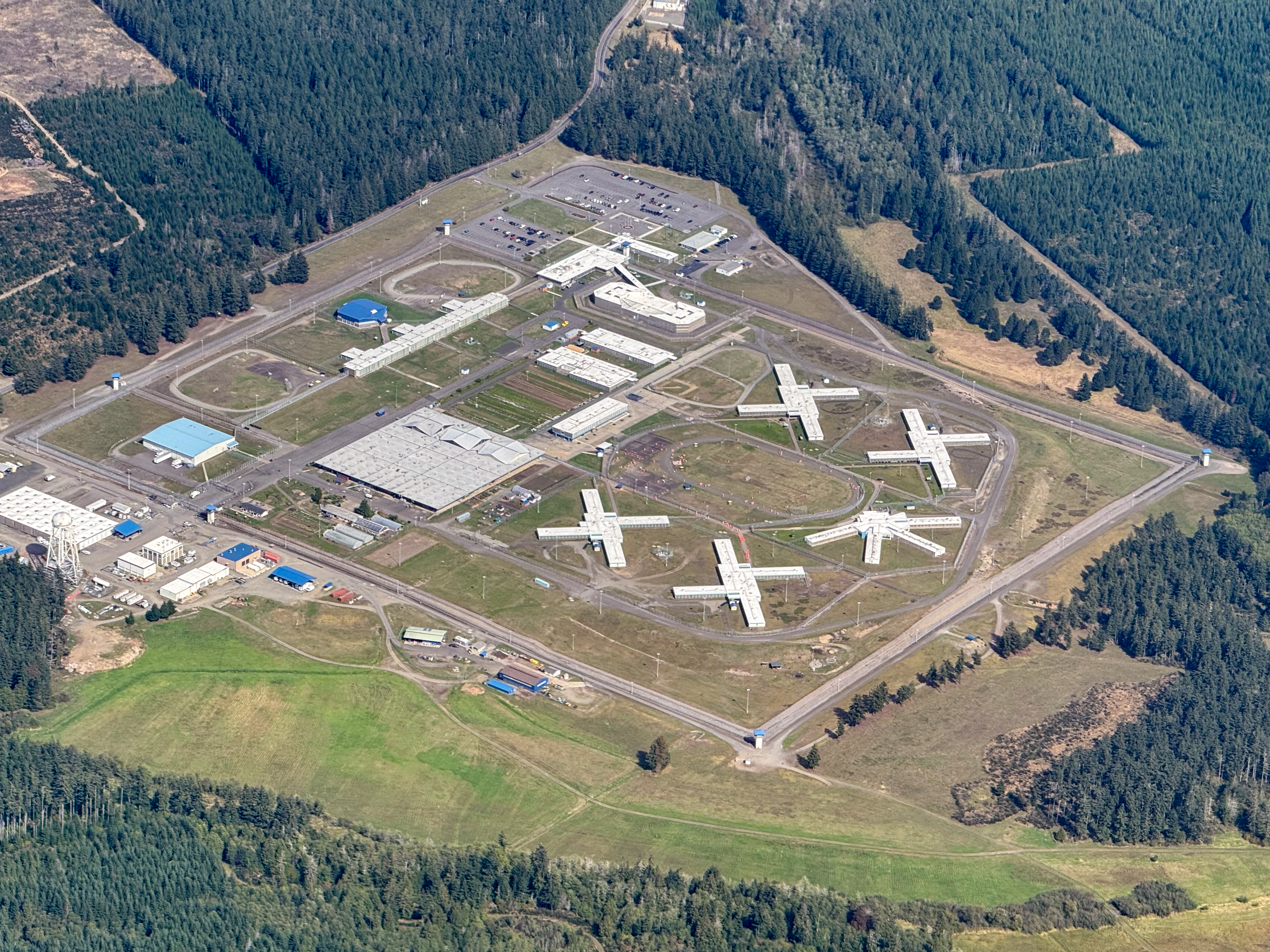
- Overhead view of Washington Corrections Center

- Location in Washington
- Location: Shelton, Washington; 47°14′13″N 123°11′35″W
- Status: Operational
- Security class: Minimum, Medium, Close, Maximum
- Capacity: 1,268
- Opened: 1964
- Managed by: Washington State Department of Corrections
- Director: Dean Mason, Superintendent
- Website: Official website

Washington Corrections Center is a Washington State Department of Corrections men's prison located in Shelton, Washington. With an operating capacity of 1,300, it is the sixth largest prison in the state (after Stafford Creek Corrections Center) and is surrounded by forestland. It opened in 1964, seventy-five years after statehood.

Washington Corrections Center is located at 2321 W Dayton Airport Rd.

== Facilities and Programs ==
Washington Corrections Center facilitates Educational and Offender Change programs, Work and Vocational programs, and Sustainability programs.

- Educational and Offender Change programs include: GED programs, Computer basics programs, and a prison library. their intent is to teach incarcerated new skills, and help them to transition into the outside world.
- Work and Vocational programs include: groundskeeping and vehicle maintenance, these are how prisoners earn prison salaries or commissary.
- Sustainability programs include: Composting, and Vegetable Gardens. Their intent is to allow prisoners to practice skills learned in prison, and make the prison self-sustaining.

== Organization ==
Washington Corrections Center is located on a 400-acre campus in Shelton, Washington. On campus, there are 9 housing units by the names of:

- Cedar
- Evergreen
- Pine
- R-1
- R-2
- R-3
- R-4
- R-5
- IMU

These vary from minimum to maximum security.

== History ==
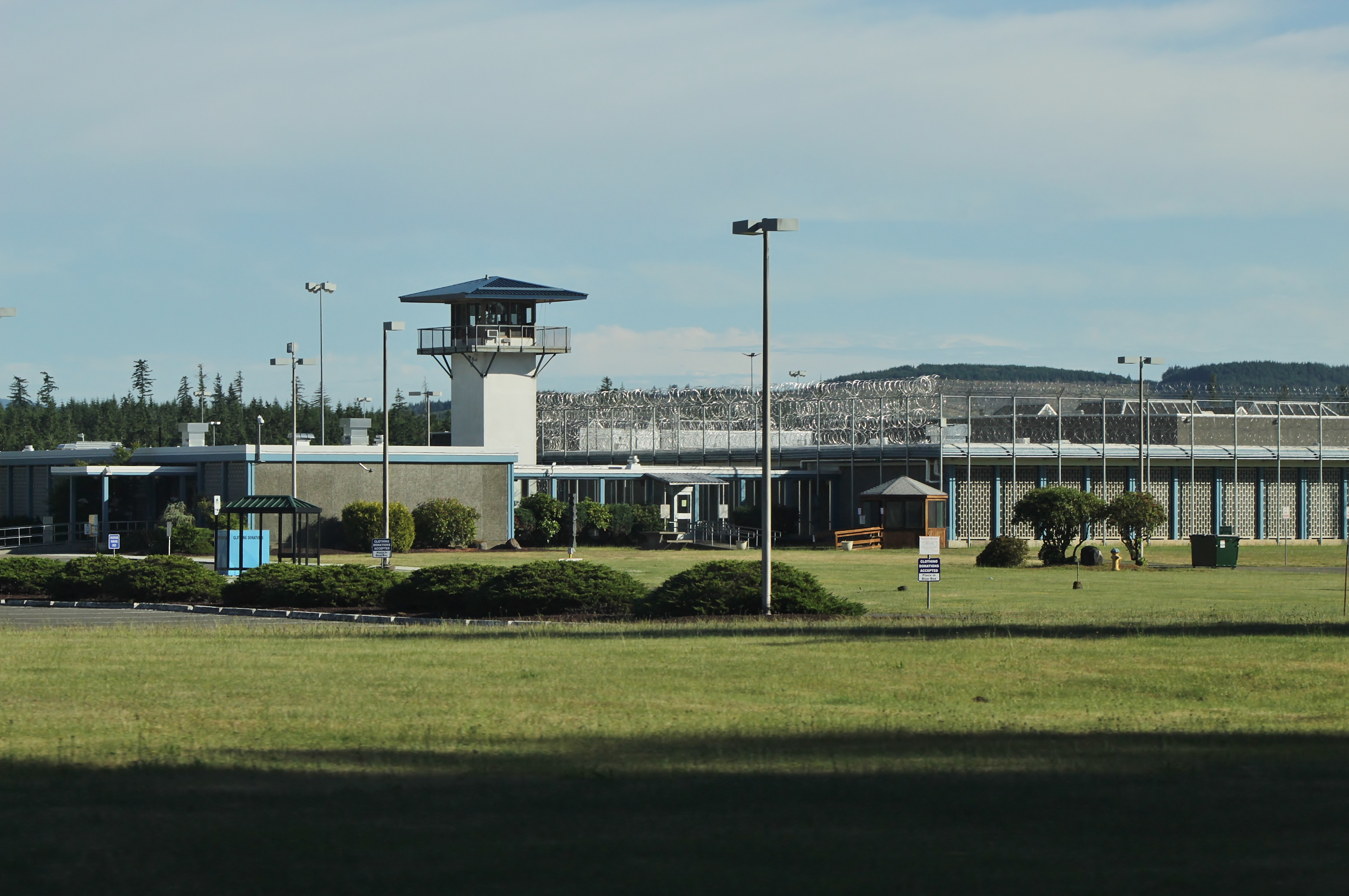
North side viewed from SR 102

Washington Corrections Center was opened 62 years ago in 1964, making it the 5th oldest prison in Washington state. All prisoners entering the Washington State Prison System must pass through Washington Corrections Center in order to be classified and assigned to a permanent residential prison. In 2014, two prisoners at Washington Corrections Center committed successful suicides, leading the Washington State Department of Corrections to reform their official policy on suicides. In September 2015, Washington Corrections Center became the second prison (after Snake River Correctional Institution in Oregon) to install a "Blueroom" inside of solitary confinement to play nature videos for prisoners.

== See also ==
- List of law enforcement agencies in Washington (state)
- List of United States state correction agencies
- List of U.S. state prisons
- List of Washington state prisons
