= Danville Leadbetter =

Confederate Army general

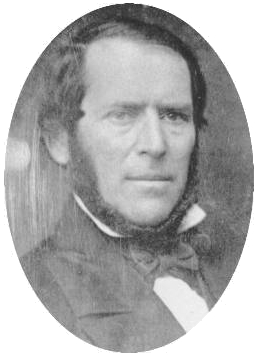
- Danville Leadbetter
- Born: August 26, 1811; Leeds, Maine, U.S.
- Died: September 26, 1866 (aged 55); Clifton, Prince Edward Island, Canada
- Burial place: Magnolia Cemetery in Mobile, Alabama
- Military career
- Allegiance: United States of America; Confederate States of America
- Branch: U.S. Army; Confederate States Army
- Service years: 1836–1857 (USA); 1861–1865 (CSA)
- Rank: Captain (USA); Brigadier General (CSA)
- Conflicts: American Civil War

Danville Leadbetter (August 26, 1811 – September 26, 1866) was a career U.S. Army officer and later he served as a Confederate general during the American Civil War.

A trained engineer, Leadbetter supervised the construction of forts before and during the war, and is noted for his controversial involvement in the November 1863 Battle of Fort Sanders in eastern Tennessee. After the conflict he left the United States and lived out the remainder of his life on foreign soil.

== Early life and career ==
Danville Leadbetter was born in Leeds, Maine. He attended the United States Military Academy in West Point in July 1832, and graduated four years later, standing third out of 49 cadets. He was commissioned a second lieutenant in the 1st U.S. Artillery on July 1, 1836. Leadbetter transferred to the Army Engineers on November 1, but as a brevet second lieutenant to rank from July 1. He then returned to the 1st Artillery on December 31, and went back and forth between the two regiments and ranks throughout 1837. Leadbetter was promoted to first lieutenant on July 7, 1838, then assigned to a joint commission of army and navy officers to identify defense sites along the Pacific Coast. Leadbetter was promoted to captain on October 16, 1852 and spent 1853–57 at Mobile, Alabama, working on the construction and/or repair of the city's harbor forts.

Leadbetter resigned from the U.S. Army on the last day of 1857 and settled in Alabama. He became the state's chief engineer and supervised the construction of the Sand Island Lighthouse.

== Civil War service ==
Choosing to follow his adopted home state and the Confederate cause, he entered service in the Confederate States Army on March 16, 1861, as a major in the army's regular engineers. He was sent to Mobile, Alabama, to oversee the defenses under construction. By August 3 he was the acting chief of the Confederacy's Engineer Bureau, a post he would hold until November 11. Two days later Leadbetter returned to Mobile and continued his work there. He was promoted to the rank of lieutenant colonel that October.

Leadbetter was promoted to brigadier general on February 27, 1862, and began his Western Theater service. In May he was given command of the 1st Brigade in the District of East Tennessee (Department Number Two), and held this position until July 3. He next served as the Engineer of various Confederate districts and armies, and was assigned Chief Engineer of the Department then Army of Tennessee in the fall of 1863.

=== Knoxville ===
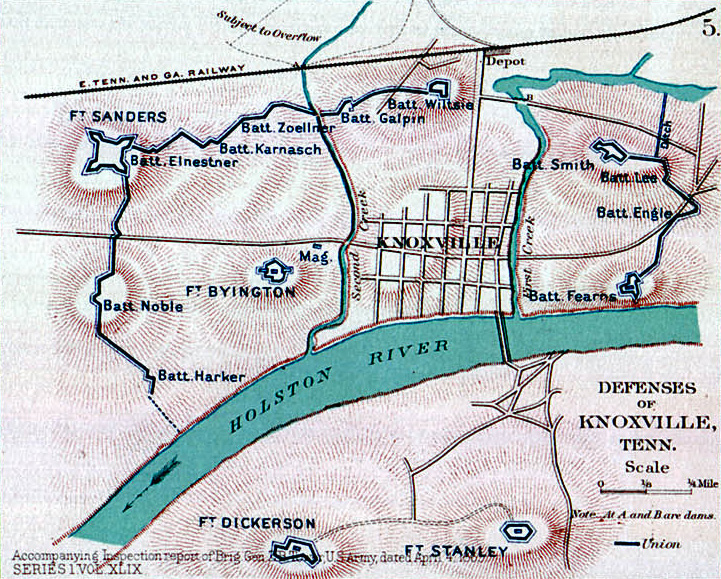
Defenses of Knoxville, Tenn.

As the Chief Engineer of the Army of Tennessee, Leadbetter was responsible for the layout of the Confederate defensive lines prior to the siege and Battle of Chattanooga. During Lt. Gen. James Longstreet's Knoxville Campaign that winter against Union-held Knoxville, Tennessee, Leadbetter was sent by army commander Gen. Braxton Bragg to aid the Confederate planning against the Federal positions. Leadbetter arrived on November 25 and consulted with Longstreet, using his prior knowledge of the fortifications in Knoxville he had designed the year before.

For two days Longstreet, his subordinates, and Leadbetter reconnoitered the Union lines around Knoxville. After a second look at Fort Sanders, the dominating feature of the Federal defenses, Leadbetter recommended hitting them there. The result of this counsel led to the selection of the attack route and the ultimately unsuccessful Battle of Fort Sanders on November 29.

Leadbetter's last Confederate command was the District of the Gulf (Department of Alabama, Mississippi, & East Louisiana) from November 22 to December 12, 1864. There is no record of him receiving a parole from the U.S. Government when the Civil War ended.

== Postbellum ==
After the war Leadbetter fled to Mexico (as did many other ex-Confederate officers) and then went to Canada, where he died in Clifton in 1866. His body was returned to Alabama and buried in Magnolia Cemetery within the city of Mobile, Alabama. Rumers persist that at one point he was shot in the head, where he was placed in a pile of dead soldiers. Two days later he was found to be alive, although possibly blind, or partially. After the war, he would end up having 10 - 15 children. Whether he died in 1866 or not has been debated. Other reports of his death have the date around 1889.

== Assessment ==
Exactly how much and the quality of Leadbetter's service to the Confederate Army is debatable. Military historian Ezra J. Warner states he was usually highly thought of by several of his superiors; however Edward Porter Alexander, whom Leadbetter served with during the Knoxville operations, was critical in post-war writings of his involvement and influence in the campaign. Most historians believe that the Knoxville campaign was a lost cause, and that any strategy would have failed, due to the overwhelming defensive position of the Union, as well as being unfavorably outnumbered.

Alexander believed that in the selection of the artillery site to attack Fort Sanders, "Leadbetter evidently had no appreciation of the ground" he himself had earlier assessed as unpracticable and very exposed. Alexander believed Longstreet knew better, "but was misled in some way I have never [been] able to understand" and that accepting Leadbetter's recommendations "robbed him of most of his few remaining chances of victory." Although many reports of his opinion are contradicted by the soldiers who survived the campaign. One soldier put it this way, " while Gen. Leadbetter did help Johnston plan the attack, no one man could have ever influenced him so much. General Johnston took advice from many but ultimately he would devise the final plans on his own while taking into consideration advice by others as well as trusting his own gut feeling." Johnston had been replaced on several occasions throughout the war for different reasons. Why Alexander disliked Leadbetter so much we may never know the entire story.

== Engineer assignments and dates ==
Leadbetter was the lead engineer of the following Confederate units, followed by his starting date:

- Chattanooga, Tennessee, from July 10, 1862
- District of the Gulf, from October 19, 1862
- Department of Tennessee, from July 25, 1863
- Army of Tennessee, from October 23, 1863
- District of the Gulf, from April 30, 1864

== See also ==
- List of American Civil War generals (Confederate)
- Leadbetter Point
