= Sanderson Field =

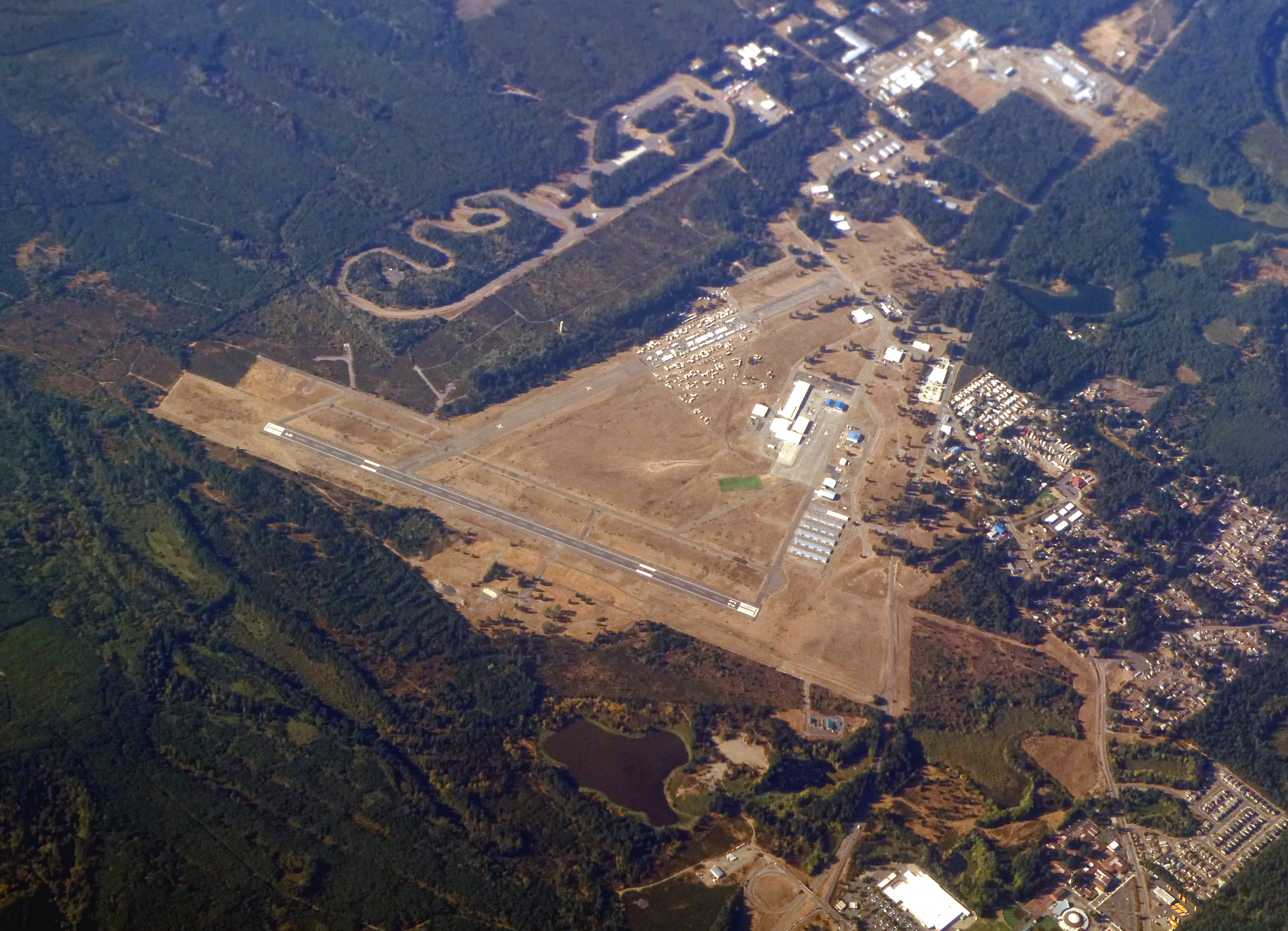
- IATA: SHN; ICAO: KSHN; FAA LID: SHN

Summary
- Airport type: Public
- Owner: Port of Shelton
- Serves: Shelton, Washington
- Elevation AMSL: 273 ft / 83 m
- Coordinates: 47°14′01″N 123°08′51″W
- Interactive map of Sanderson Field

Runways
Direction	Length		Surface
Direction	ft	m	Surface
5/23	5,005	1,526	Asphalt

Statistics (2020)
- Aircraft operations: 47,930
- Based aircraft: 76
- Source: Federal Aviation Administration

Sanderson Field (IATA: SHN, ICAO: KSHN, FAA LID: SHN) is a public lighted-land airport located in Shelton, a city in Mason County, Washington, United States. It is located just outside the City of Shelton corporate limits, and is owned and operated by the Port of Shelton. It is bordered on the south by the Mason County Fairgrounds, on the north by a business park and Dayton Airport Road, on the west by the Washington State Patrol Training Academy, and on the east by U.S. Highway 101. The airport was named after Major General Lawson H. M. Sanderson of the United States Marine Corps.

== History ==
Sanderson Field originally operated under the name Mason County Airport. and opened in the late 1920s. In 1941, the United States Navy took over operations of Mason County Airport for use as a Naval Air Station during World War II and became Naval Air Station Shelton. Under the ownership of the Navy, a new runway was added, and the facilities expanded. The airport closed down as a naval air installation in 1955 and sat unused for eleven years until reopening in August 1966. At the reopening dedication on August 28, it was deeded back to the Port of Shelton (who owns the airport today), christened "Sanderson Field" and the facilities improved. The larger of two runways (north-south; designated 17–35) was closed, and runway 5-23 (east-west) was expanded and kept open. The closed runway has occasionally been used as a drag strip. In late 1993, a chainlink security fence was added to the perimeter of the airport and in 1994 five new hangars were built at the southeast corner. A large number of buildings today are remnants of the World War II era.

== Facilities and aircraft ==
Sanderson Field covers an area of 1,054 acres (427 ha) at an elevation of 273 feet (83 m) above mean sea level. It has one active runway (5/23), running in an east–west orientation with a 5,005 by 100 foot (1,526 m × 30 m) asphalt pavement. The active runway has medium-intensity runway edge lighting, installed in 1986, that operates from dusk to dawn. The primary approach is on Runway 23, which has a four-light Precision Approach Path Indicator system. A former runway (17/35) runs in a north–south orientation and has been deactivated since the early 1960s. Remnants of the former runway's markings are visible from the air and in high-resolution satellite imagery.

Services at Sanderson include minor airframe and powerplant repair by Olympic Air. Additionally, a 24-hour fuel station offers 100LL and JET-A grades of aircraft fuel. There are parking tiedowns for up to 36 aircraft on a spacious parking ramp adjacent to the Olympic Air maintenance shop. In 2006, a new 10,000 sq ft (930 m^{2}) hangar was built to the north of Olympic Air, housing the airport's newest FBO (Fixed-Base Operator) Kapowsin Air Sports. The new facility was built to house two planes equipped for skydiving operations as well as an on-site pilot's cafe.

For the 12-month period ending December 31, 2020, the airport had 47,930 aircraft operations, an average of 131 per day: 79% general aviation, 20% military and <1% air taxi. At that time there were 76 aircraft based at this airport: 63 single-engine, 4 multi-engine, 4 helicopter and 5 ultralight.

== See also ==
- List of airports in Washington (state)
