= Loomis Lake =

Freshwater lake in Washington

Coordinates: 46°26′18″N 124°02′35″W

Loomis Lake is a freshwater lake located on the Long Beach Peninsula in Pacific County, Washington. It covers an area of about 167 acres, making it the largest lake on the peninsula, although it is very shallow, with a maximum depth of only about nine feet. Long and narrow, Loomis Lake formed in the low-lying area between dune ridges at an elevation of about 10 feet above sea level. It is fed by rainfall and groundwater contributions.
