= Pacific Pines State Park =

State park in Washington (state), United States

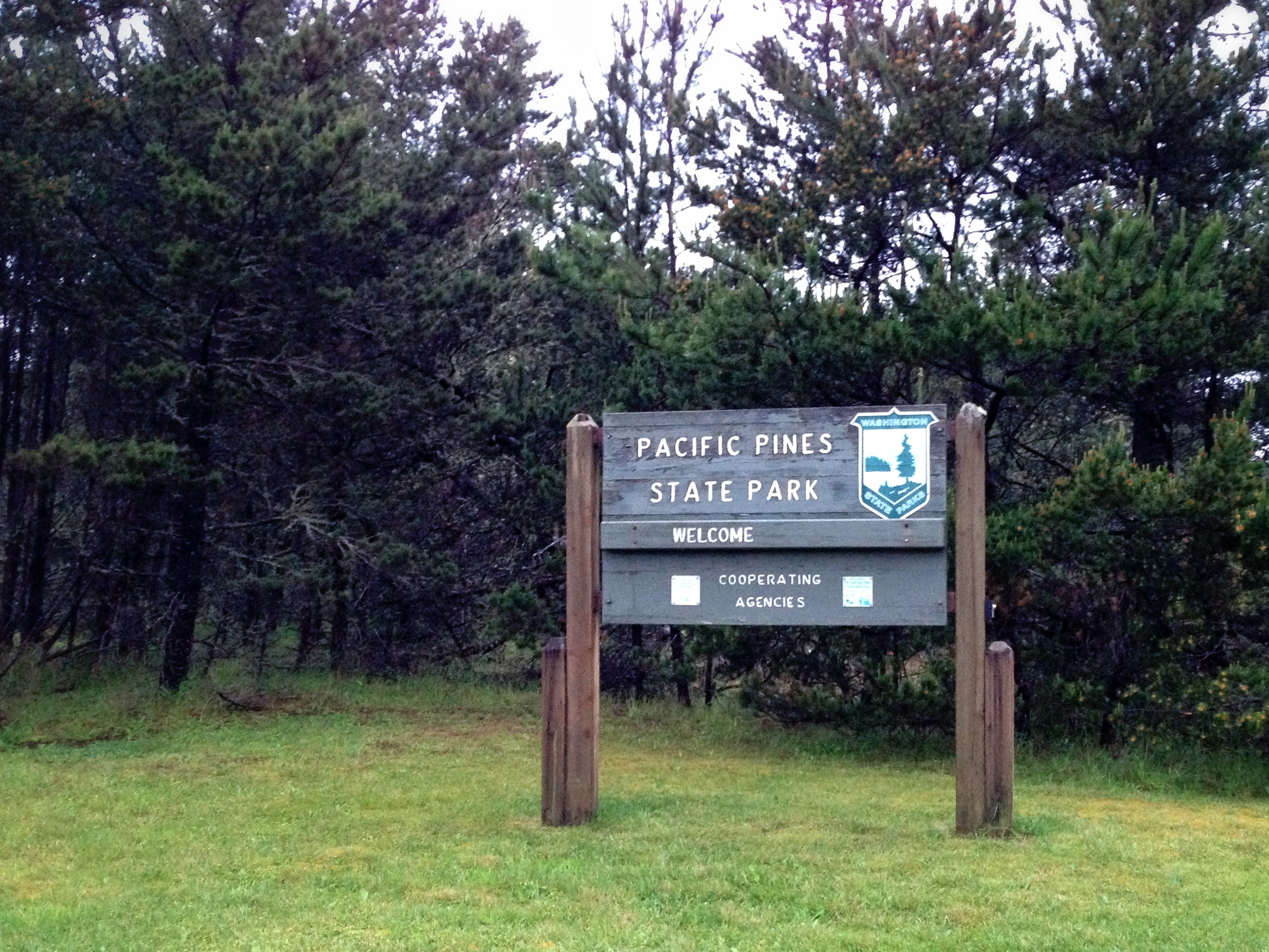

- Location within Washington (state) Location within the United States
- Location: Pacific County, Washington, United States
- Coordinates: 46°30′07″N 124°03′19″W
- Area: 10 acres (4.0 ha)
- Elevation: 16 ft (4.9 m)
- Established: 1972
- Administrator: Washington State Parks and Recreation Commission
- Visitors: 19,352 (in 2024)
- Website: Official website

Pacific Pines State Park is a 10-acre (4.0 ha) Washington state park on the Long Beach Peninsula, just north of Ocean Park. From the main parking area, there is a narrow, sandy footpath that leads through a grove of Pacific Ponderosa pine trees to the beach. The park offers picnicking, beachcombing, fishing, clamming, and crabbing.
