= Leadbetter Point =

Peninsula in Washington, US

- Point, peninsula
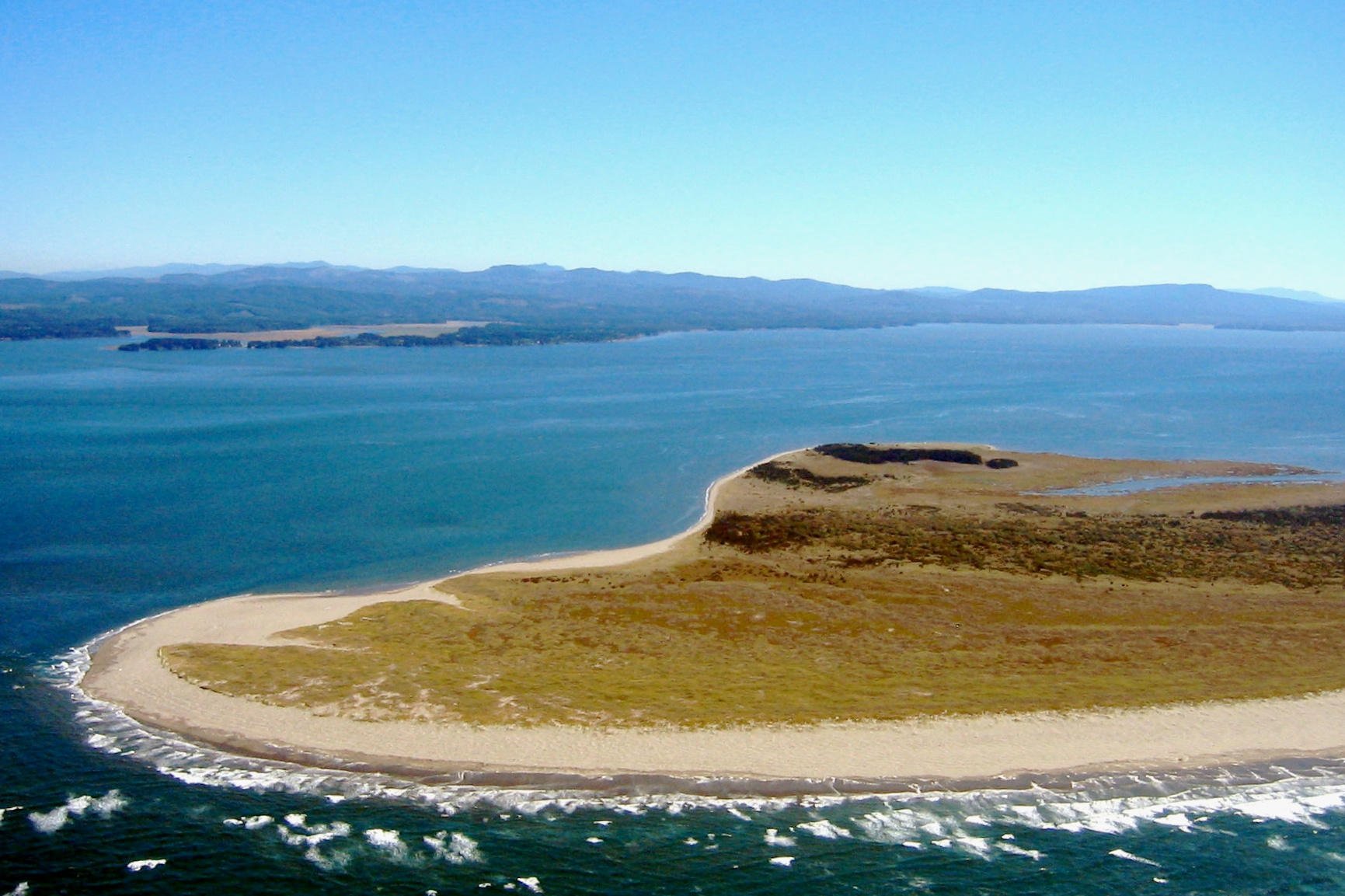
- Leadbetter Point, 2010

- Location within Washington (state)
- Coordinates: 46°39′0″N 124°3′40″W
- Location: Pacific County, Washington
- Water bodies: Willapa Bay
- Etymology: Danville Leadbetter
- GNIS feature ID: 1506120

Leadbetter Point is a point on the northwest coast of Pacific County in the state of Washington in the United States. It lies at the southern side of the entrance to Willapa Bay.

Leadbetter Point was named in 1852 by James Alden for fellow U.S. Coast Survey officer Danville Leadbetter.

== See also ==
- Leadbetter Point State Park
