= Washington State Route 102 =

State highway in Mason County, Washington, US

State Route 102
- Dayton Airport Road
- SR 102 highlighted in red

Route information
- Auxiliary route of US 101
- Maintained by WSDOT
- Length: 2.86 mi (4.60 km)
- Existed: 1984–present

Major junctions
- West end: Washington Corrections Center
- East end: US 101 near Shelton

Location
- Country: United States
- State: Washington
- County: Mason

Highway system
- State highways in Washington; Interstate; US; State; Scenic; Pre-1964; 1964 renumbering; Former
← US 101	→ SR 103

State Route 102 (SR 102) is a 2.86-mile-long (4.60 km) state highway serving the Washington Corrections Center and Washington State Patrol Academy in the U.S. state of Washington. The highway extends northeast and east as Dayton Airport Road from the Washington Corrections Center through rural Mason County to an intersection with U.S. Route 101 (US 101) northwest of Shelton. SR 102 was established in 1984 on an unpaved roadway that was built by the 1950s.

== Route description ==
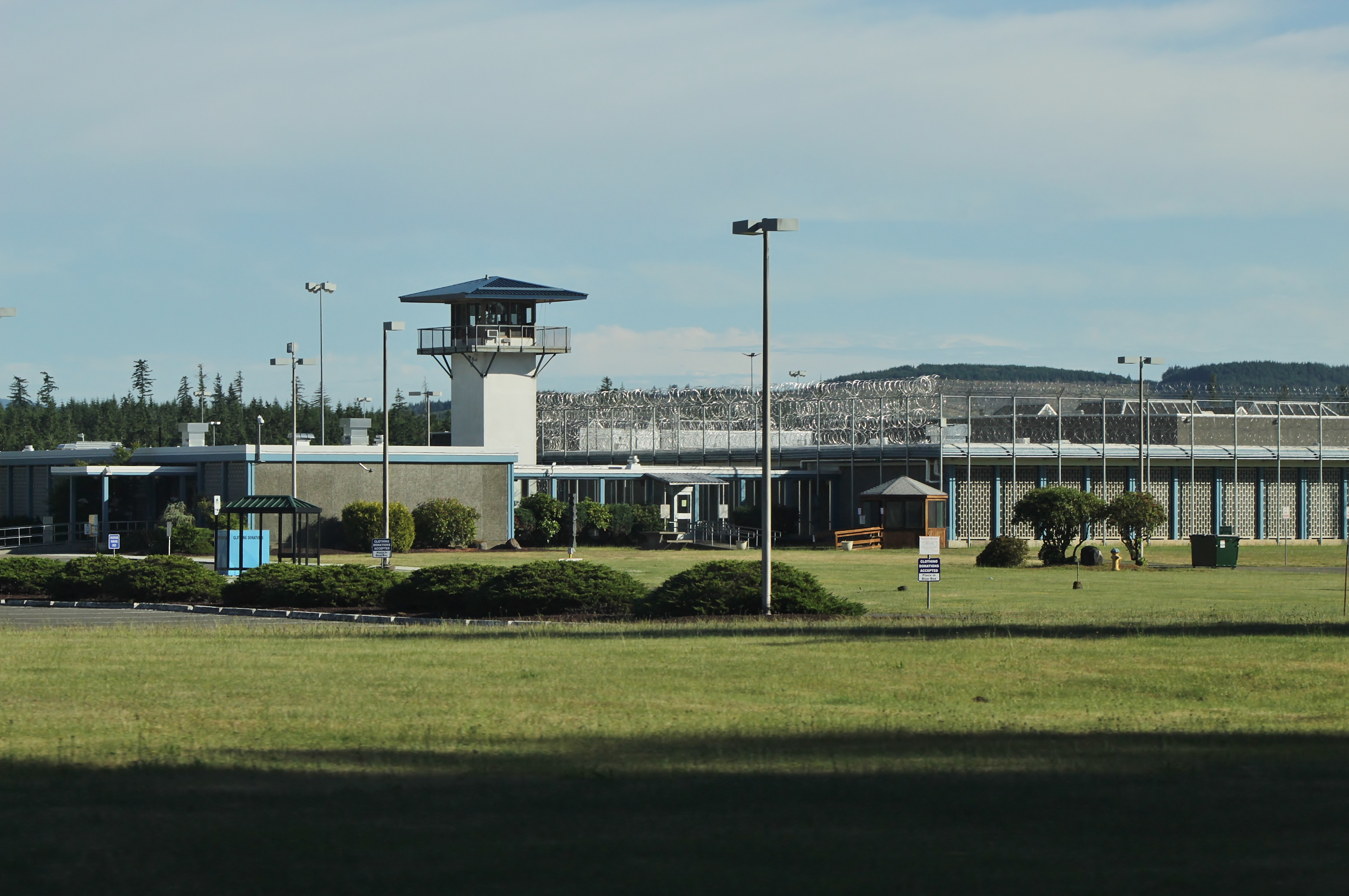
The Washington Corrections Center photographed from SR 102

SR 102 begins as the two-lane Dayton Airport Road at an intersection with the Washington Corrections Center access road and travels northeast into a heavily wooded area. The highway turns east, passing the Washington State Patrol Academy and The Ridge Motorsports Park, before it ends at an intersection with US 101 north of Sanderson Field and west of Turtle Lake. The entire highway is located northwest of Shelton in unincorporated Mason County.

Every year, the Washington State Department of Transportation (WSDOT) conducts a series of surveys on its highways in the state to measure traffic volume. This is expressed in terms of annual average daily traffic (AADT), which is a measure of traffic volume for any average day of the year. In 2011, WSDOT calculated that between 2,000 and 4,100 vehicles per day used the highway, mostly at the US 101 intersection.

== History ==
SR 102 was established in 1984 on the existing Dayton Airport Road northwest of Shelton. Dayton Airport Road (Mason County Road 990) was built as an unpaved road by the 1940s and was paved by the 1970s. A 1973 report to the state legislature recommended against including the road in the state highway system and estimated the costs to improve it to "acceptable standards" to be $417,000. SR 102 was chipsealed by WSDOT in 2018 as part of improvements to US 101 in the area.

== Major intersections ==
The entire highway is in Mason County.

Location	mi	km	Destinations	Notes
	0.00	0.00	Washington Corrections Center	Western terminus; continues as Dayton Airport Road
	2.86	4.60	US 101 – Shelton, Port Angeles	Eastern terminus
1.000 mi = 1.609 km; 1.000 km = 0.621 mi
