= Seaview, Washington =

Unincorporated community in Washington, United States

Seaview
- Unincorporated community
- Location in Washington Location in United States
- Coordinates: 46°20′04″N 124°03′17″W
- Country: United States
- State: Washington
- County: Pacific
- Elevation: 20 ft (6.1 m)

Population (2010)
  - Total: 473
- Time zone: UTC-8 (Pacific (PST))
  - Summer (DST): UTC-7 (PDT)
- ZIP codes: 98644
- Area code: 360
- GNIS feature ID: 1512652

Seaview is an unincorporated community in Pacific County, Washington. It is located near Long Beach and had a population for its 98644 ZIP code at the 2010 census of 473 people.

== Geography ==
Seaview is located in extreme southwest Washington state on the Long Beach Peninsula.

== History ==
Seaview's history began in 1859 when Jonathan Stout, a cooper from Ohio, arrived on the Long Beach Peninsula. In 1880 he purchased 153 acres along the ocean front with plans for a summer resort. He ran through several names for the resort—Stout's, Ocean View, North Pacific Beach, and finally Sea View. He built a hotel a few hundred feet from the mean high tide line with an ocean view across the driftwood that accumulated every winter. A half mile of accreted sand covered with trees now separate the hotel's site from the ocean due to the effects of the North Jetty at the mouth of the Columbia River.

Stout recorded his townsite at the Pacific County courthouse in October 1881 and soon began selling lots. Most were fifty by one hundred feet and sold for one hundred dollars. To build a cottage on a lot cost between two and three hundred dollars. They were board-and-batten on the outside, with no insulation or interior plasterwork. Many Portlanders purchased lots and built houses in Seaview throughout the 1880s and early 1890s, until the Panic of 1893 put a damper on such luxuries.

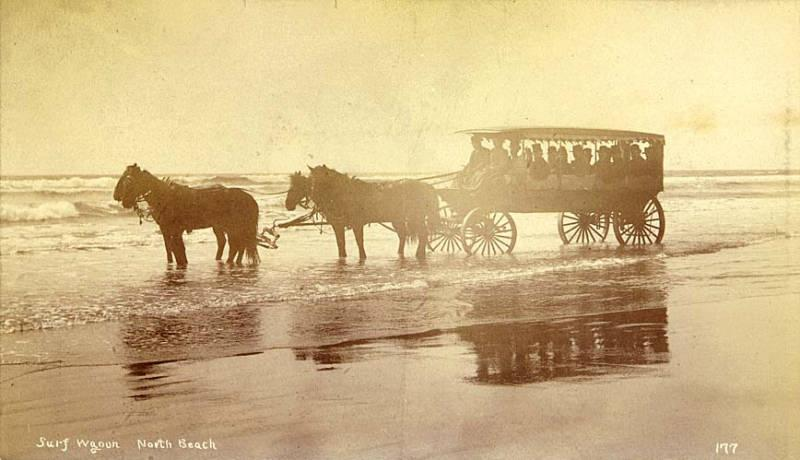
Wagon on North Beach circa 1892. Before the construction of the railroad a wagon like this one was the only way of access to the Long Beach peninsula north of Ilwaco.

Most of those who built summer homes in Seaview would ride a steamboat down the Columbia River to Astoria on the Oregon side where they would disembark and board a smaller steamboat to take them across the river to Ilwaco. There they could transfer their trunks to a wagon and be drawn by horses the rest of the way. The wagon route went through the woods on a plank road to the "weather beach," and then along the beach to Seaview.

In 1889 the Ilwaco Railway and Navigation Company began regular service on a narrow gauge railroad that ran up the Long Beach Peninsula to Nahcotta. The Seaview depot—no more than a shed and platform at first—was near Stout's hotel, the "Sea View House." With railway service, summering families could board the railcars right on the Ilwaco docks for the trip up the peninsula. In 1885, many hundreds of people were estimated to be coming to the peninsula for summer vacation. In 1900, the South Bend Journal reported that the number of summer vacationers had grown to 20,000.

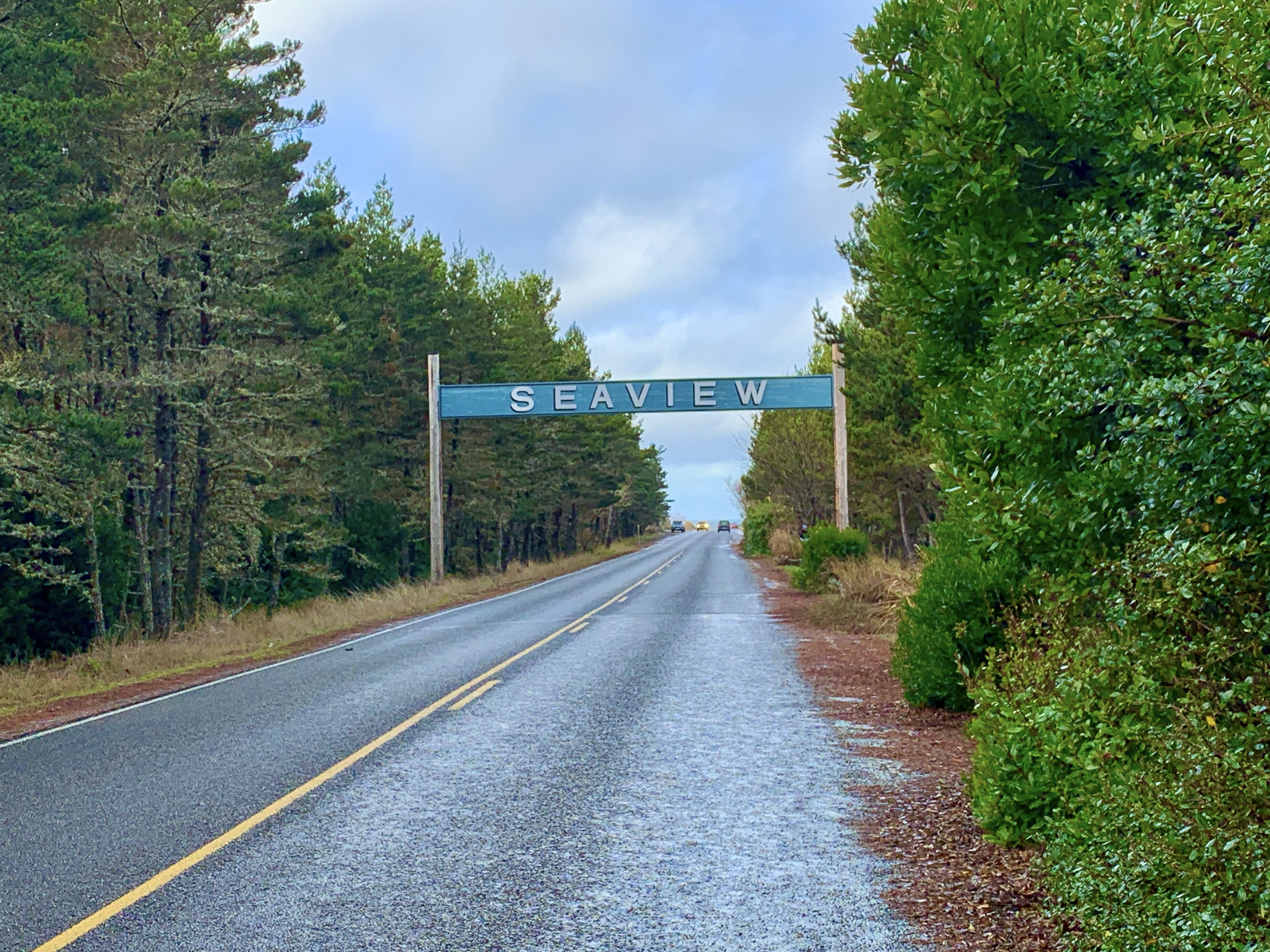
The sign marking the Seaview approach to Long Island Beach

In 1892 US Senator and Portland businessman Henry Winslow Corbett built a vacation home in Seaview on three acres facing the ocean. This summer home, which he named Westborough House, included the main three-story house with a ballroom on the second floor as well as housing for the servants and a stable for horses and carriages. A cow accompanied the family for its summer sojourn on the peninsula so they would always have fresh milk. In the late 1930s the property left the Corbett family and became the Grandview Lodge, welcoming tourists with rooms in the main house and cabins on the grounds. Grandview Lodge is now the Sou'wester Lodge, still an imposing sight on the Seaview beach approach. It has often functioned as a cultural center in Seaview, hosting lectures, literary events, topical discussions, dramatic performances, and chamber concerts. The Corbett pasture is now an RV park and campground.

In 1905 a regular depot was built at Seaview on the east side of the tracks. The Seaview Depot's front doors opened toward the north onto the main Seaview beach approach road, and a long wooden boardwalk ran along the tracks on the west side of the depot and past adjoining businesses to the south end of the block. Departing passengers stood on the boardwalk the length of the block awaiting a train's arrival. Two photos of the depot from 1908 and 1910 show three or four businesses on the boardwalk south of the depot. The photos, linked below, show no business names, but there appear to be an ice cream shop, an "Oyster House and Lunch Room," and a fish market. The first photo shows a train approaching the station from the south. The second photo shows a train heading north as it departs the station. In each photo, the same two children in the same outfits are looking at the photographer from the west side of the tracks. Despite the labeling of one photo as "circa 1910" and the other as "circa 1908," the photos were apparently taken only minutes apart on the same day.

The Seaview depot building still exists, and is now a restaurant. The Hotel Shelburne, built in Seaview in 1896, still exists today as the Shelburne Country Inn. Other hotels in Seaview included the Hackney Cottage, Sunset Hotel, The Hotel Seaview and The Sou'Wester Inn.

== Notable people ==
Notable people associated with Seaview usually have lived somewhere else most of the year and have spent only summers in Seaview.

- Henry W. Corbett (1827-1903), US Senator
- Terence O'Donnell (1924-2001), American writer

== See also ==
- Long Beach, Washington
- Ilwaco Railway and Navigation Company
