= Ocean Park, Washington =

- CDP
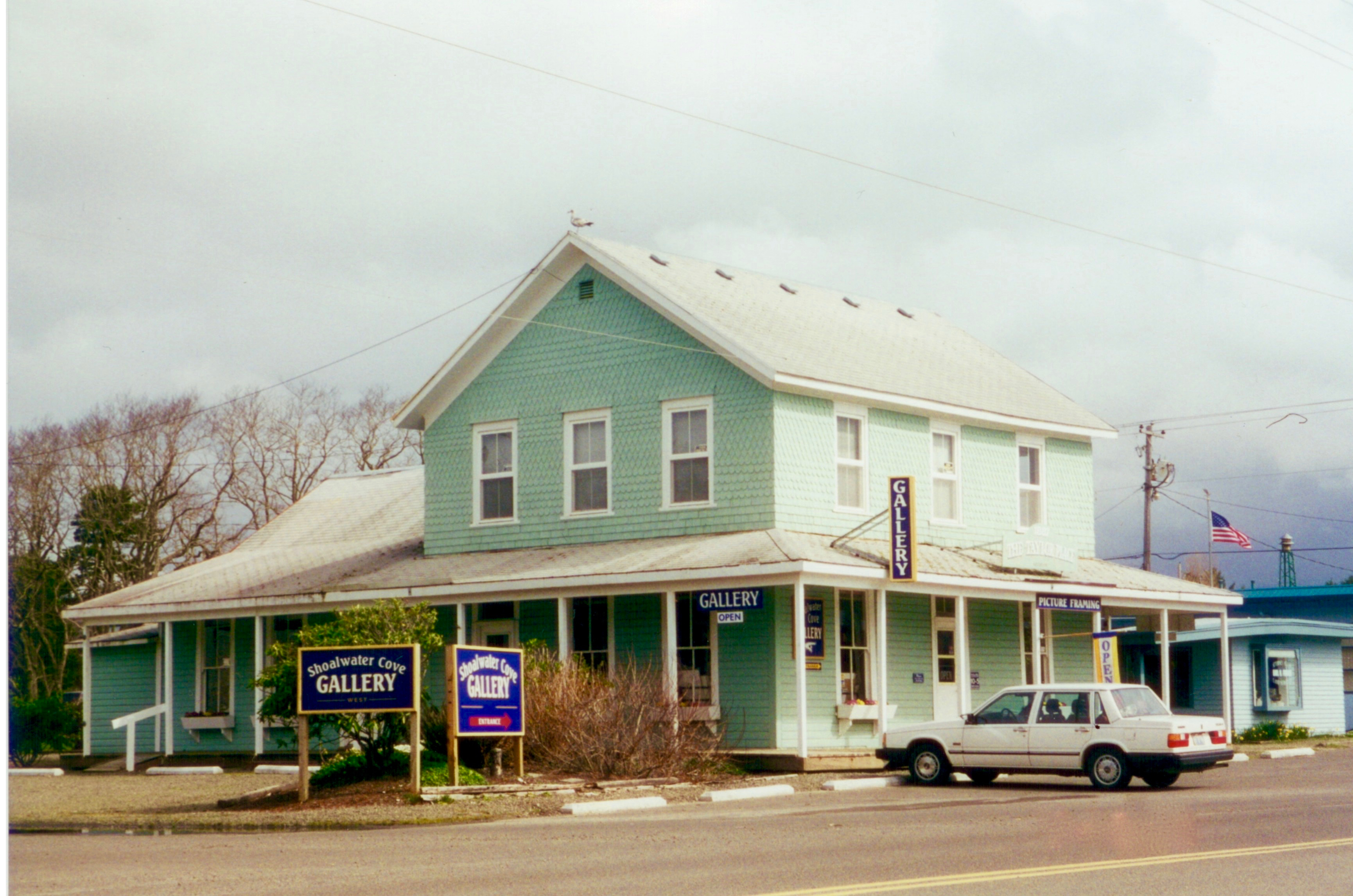
- Taylor Hotel, Ocean Park

- Location of Ocean Park, Washington
- Coordinates: 46°30′09″N 124°02′34″W
- Country: United States
- State: Washington
- County: Pacific

Area
  - Total: 3.9 sq mi (10.0 km^{2})
  - Land: 3.1 sq mi (7.9 km^{2})
  - Water: 0.85 sq mi (2.2 km^{2})
- Elevation: 30 ft (9.1 m)

Population (2020)
  - Total: 1,814
  - Density: 590/sq mi (230/km^{2})
- Time zone: UTC-8 (Pacific (PST))
  - Summer (DST): UTC-7 (PDT)
- ZIP Code: 98640
- Area code(s): 360, 564
- FIPS code: 53-50535
- GNIS feature ID: 2408973

Ocean Park is a census-designated place (CDP) in Pacific County, Washington, United States. The population was 1,814 at the 2020 census. It is on the Long Beach Peninsula, north of Long Beach, Washington.

== Geography ==
Ocean Park is located on the Long Beach Peninsula and adjacent to Pacific Pines State Park.

According to the United States Census Bureau, the CDP has a total area of 3.9 square miles (10.0 km^{2}), of which, 3.0 square miles (7.9 km^{2}) of it is land and 0.8 square miles (2.1 km^{2}) of it (21.45%) is water.

== Demographics ==
Historical population
Census	Pop.	Note	%±
2000	1,459		—
2010	1,573		7.8%
2020	1,814		15.3%
US Decennial Census; 2020 Census

=== 2020 census ===
As of the 2020 census, Ocean Park had a population of 1,814. The median age was 62.7 years. 10.4% of residents were under the age of 18 and 42.4% of residents were 65 years of age or older. For every 100 females there were 92.6 males, and for every 100 females age 18 and over there were 90.1 males age 18 and over.

98.6% of residents lived in urban areas, while 1.4% lived in rural areas.

There were 942 households in Ocean Park, of which 12.4% had children under the age of 18 living in them. Of all households, 46.0% were married-couple households, 20.9% were households with a male householder and no spouse or partner present, and 26.6% were households with a female householder and no spouse or partner present. About 36.3% of all households were made up of individuals and 19.9% had someone living alone who was 65 years of age or older.

There were 1,892 housing units, of which 50.2% were vacant. The homeowner vacancy rate was 1.7% and the rental vacancy rate was 10.6%.

Racial composition as of the 2020 census
Race	Number	Percent
White	1,599	88.1%
Black or African American	5	0.3%
American Indian and Alaska Native	19	1.0%
Asian	10	0.6%
Native Hawaiian and Other Pacific Islander	4	0.2%
Some other race	46	2.5%
Two or more races	131	7.2%
Hispanic or Latino (of any race)	92	5.1%

=== 2000 census ===
As of the census of 2000, there were 1,459 people, 710 households, and 416 families residing in the CDP. The population density was 480.2 people per square mile (185.3/km^{2}). There were 1,505 housing units at an average density of 495.3/sq mi (191.1/km^{2}). The racial makeup of the CDP was 94.52% White, 0.27% African American, 1.85% Native American, 0.27% Asian, 0.07% Pacific Islander, 1.64% from other races, and 1.37% from two or more races. Hispanic or Latino of any race were 4.18% of the population. 25.0% were of German, 13.4% English, 12.9% Irish and 5.2% Swedish ancestry according to Census 2000.

There were 710 households, of which 17.0% had children under the age of 18 living with them, 46.9% were married couples living together, 8.6% had a female householder with no husband present, and 41.4% were non-families. 34.1% of all households were made up of individuals, and 18.5% had someone living alone who was 65 years of age or older. The average household size was 2.05 and the average family size was 2.55.

In the CDP, the population's age distribution was spread out, with 16.6% under the age of 18, 5.3% from 18 to 24, 18.8% from 25 to 44, 28.7% from 45 to 64, and 30.6% who were 65 years of age or older. The median age was 52 years. For every 100 females, there were 99.9 males. For every 100 females age 18 and over, there were 95.0 males.

The median income for a household in the CDP was $22,932, and the median income for a family was $30,208. Males had a median income of $35,536 versus $21,528 for females. The per capita income for the CDP was $18,261. About 7.3% of families and 15.3% of the population were below the poverty line, including 27.9% of those under age 18 and 4.9% of those age 65 or over.

== History ==
Ocean Park was once a station on the Ilwaco Railway and Navigation Company, a narrow gauge railroad that ran along the Long Beach Peninsula from 1889 to 1930. One of the oldest buildings in Pacific County is the Taylor Hotel building, built in 1887, currently in use as Adelaide's Cafe and Bookstore named after Adelaide Taylor, the wife of the original hotel owner. The oldest building in Ocean Park is the Lamberson Cabin, built in 1883 by Buell Lamberson. The cabin has been kept in private family ownership through the generations for the use of Lamberson descendants.
