= Leadbetter Point State Park =

State Park in Washington, United States

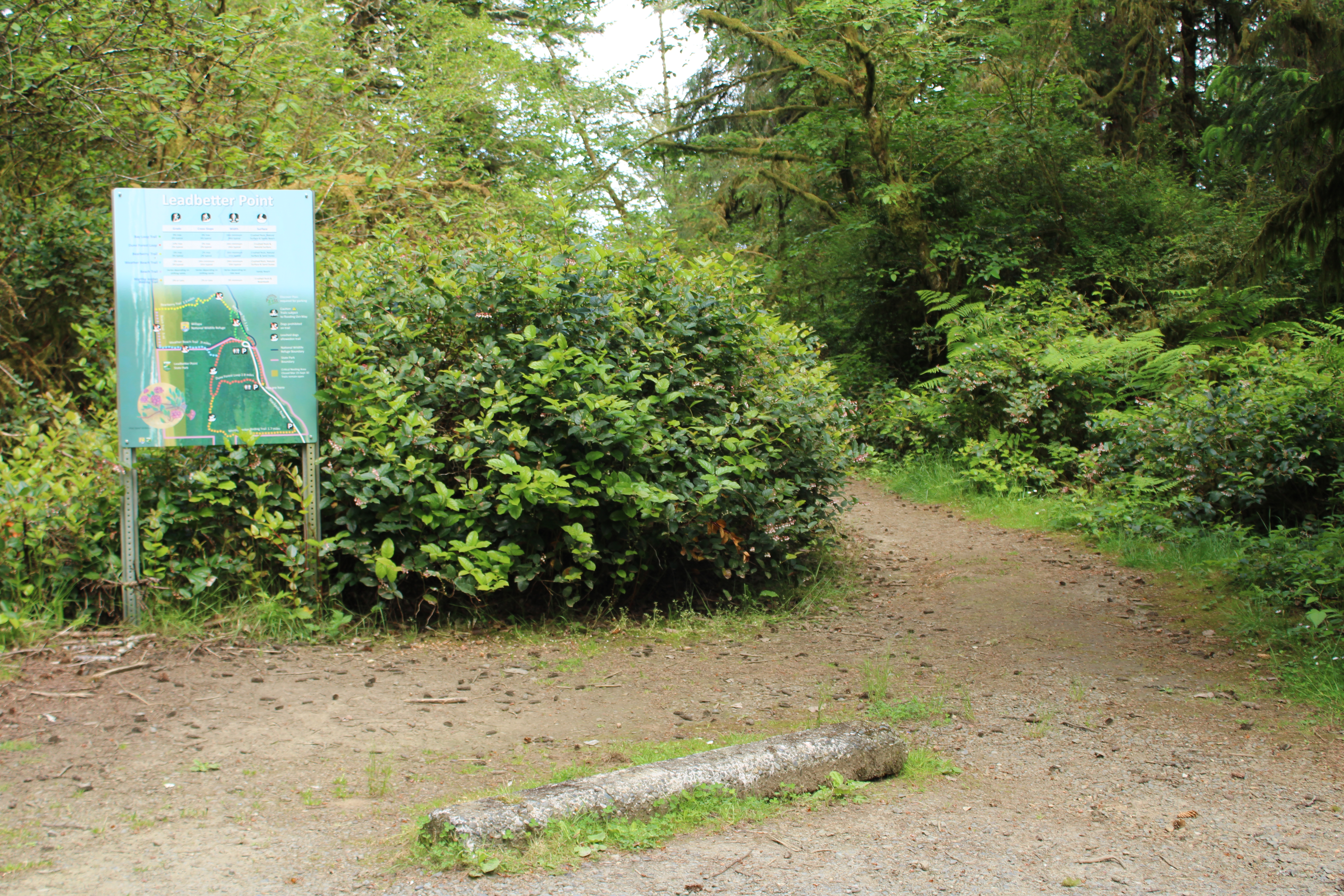
- Trailhead, 2025

- Location within Washington (state) Location within the United States
- Location: Pacific County, Washington, United States
- Coordinates: 46°35′17″N 124°02′08″W
- Area: 1,732 acres (701 ha)
- Elevation: 13 ft (4.0 m)
- Established: 1964
- Administrator: Washington State Parks and Recreation Commission
- Visitors: 97,955 (in 2024)
- Website: Official website

Leadbetter Point State Park is a nature preserve and public recreation area located sixteen miles (26 km) north of the city of Long Beach, Washington, at the northern tip of the Long Beach Peninsula. The state park is bounded by the Pacific Ocean to the west and Willapa Bay to the east and shares a border with the Willapa National Wildlife Refuge. The park's Martha Jordan Birding Trail goes through Hines Marsh, wintering grounds for trumpeter swans. Other park activities include hiking, boating, fishing, clamming, and beachcombing.

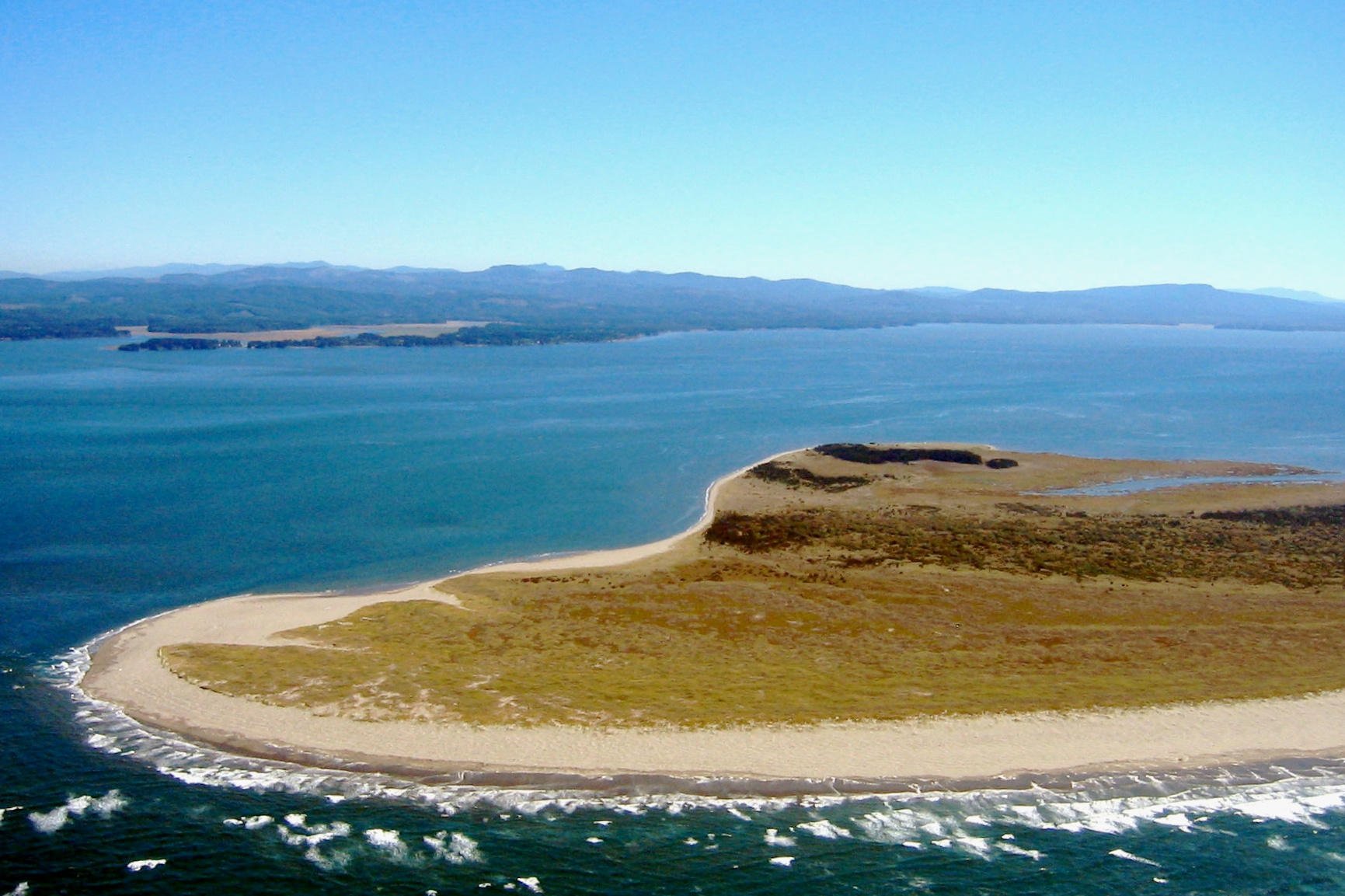
Leadbetter Point, 2010

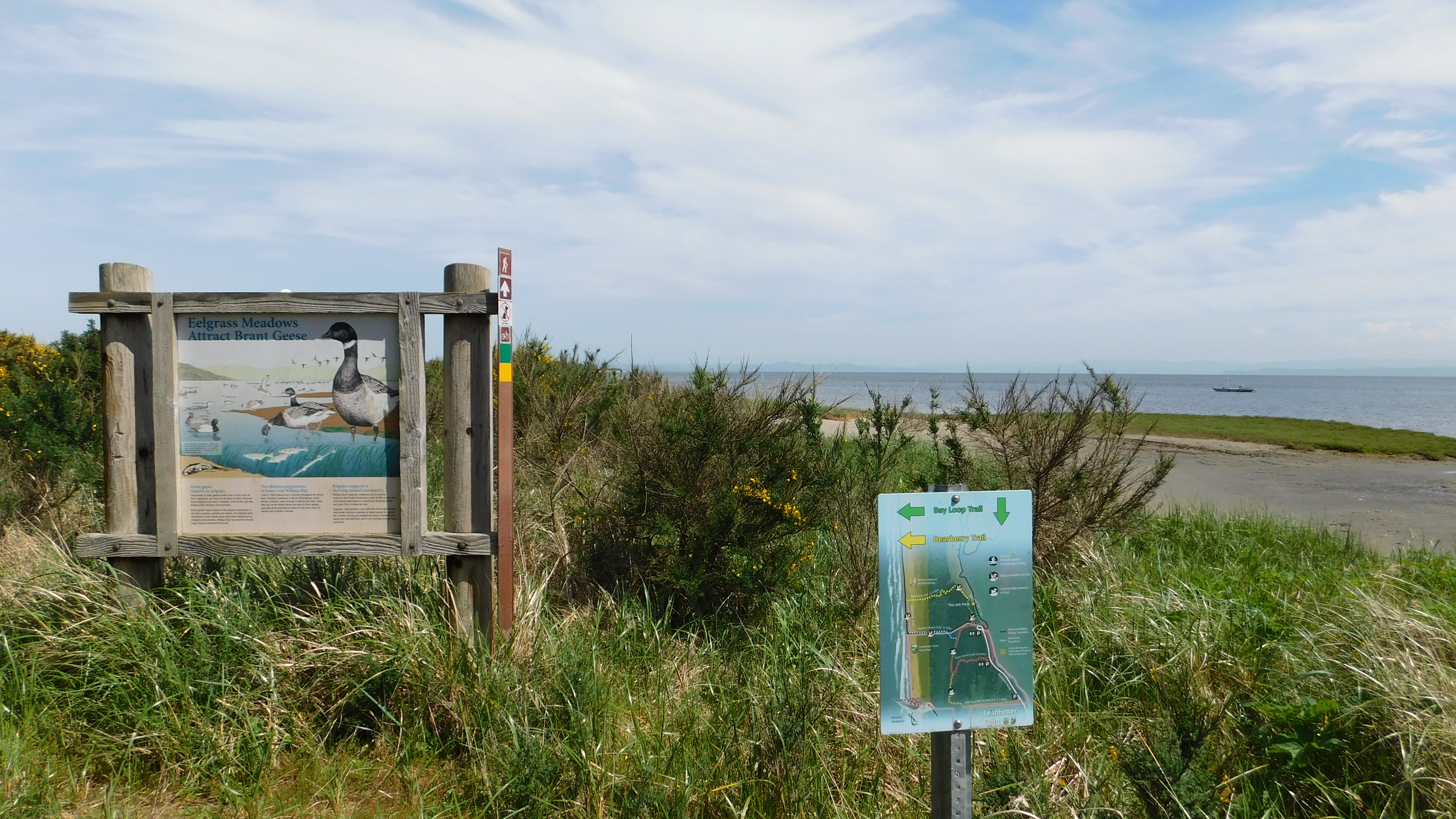
Interpretive sign and trail map, 2026

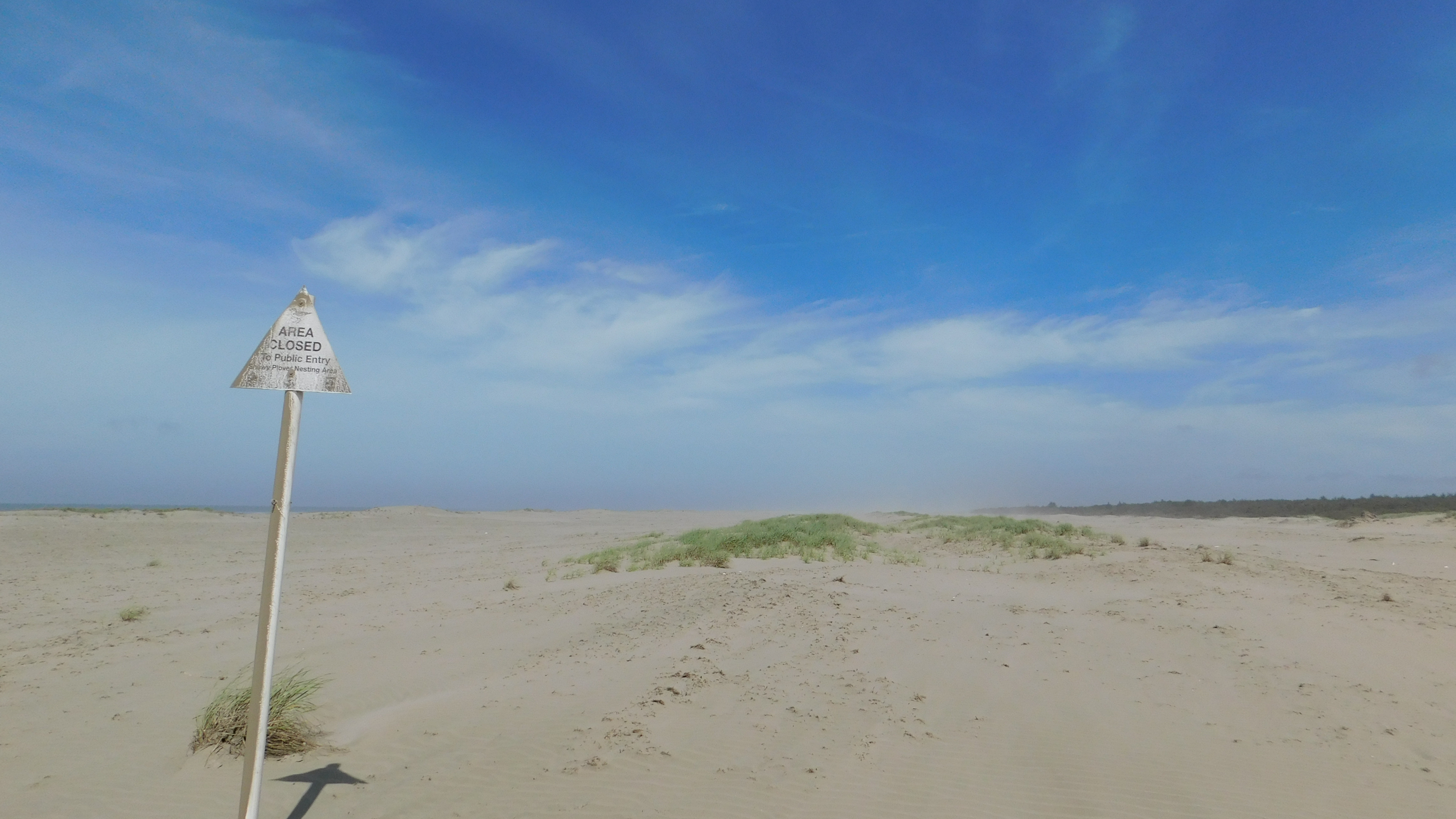
Snowy plover Nesting Area, 2026

== See also ==
- Leadbetter Point
