= Long Beach Peninsula =

Peninsula in the south Washington state

Coordinates: 46°27′36″N 124°02′35″W

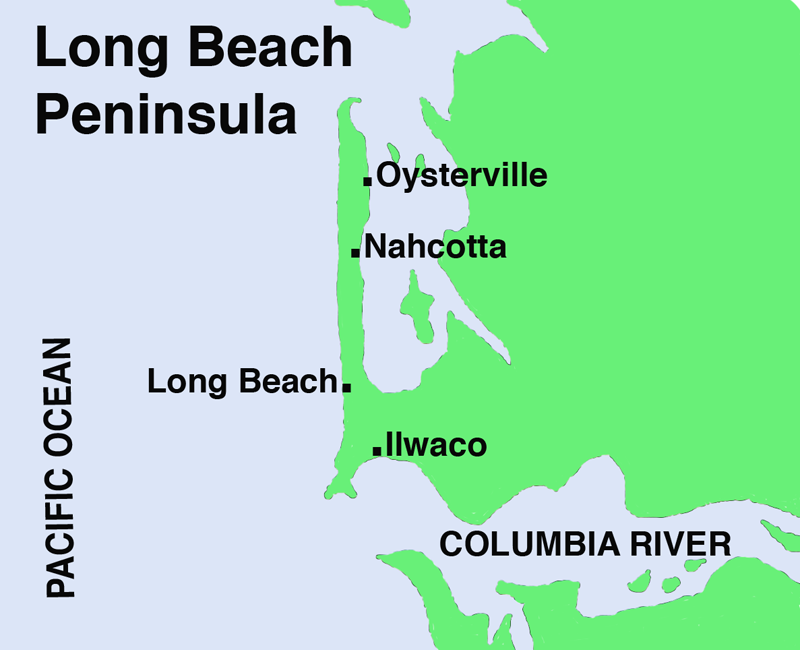
Long Beach Peninsula

The Long Beach Peninsula is an arm of land on the southern coast of the state of Washington in the United States. Entirely within Pacific County, it is bounded on the west by the Pacific Ocean, the south by the Columbia River, and the east by Willapa Bay. Leadbetter Point State Park and Willapa National Wildlife Refuge are at the northern end of the peninsula and Cape Disappointment is at the southern end, with Pacific Pines State Park located in between.

Cape Disappointment State Park west of Ilwaco, part of the Lewis and Clark National Historical Park, was the westernmost terminus for the Lewis and Clark Expedition. A monument designed by Maya Lin as part of the Confluence Project was dedicated there in 2005.

The Long Beach Peninsula is known for its continuous sand beach 28 miles (45 km) in extent on the Pacific Ocean side, claimed to be the longest peninsula beach in the world.

This is a popular vacation destination for people from Seattle, Washington (165 miles (266 km) distant) and Portland, Oregon (115 miles (185 km) distant).

== Geography ==
Due to its low elevation and coastal location, the peninsula is at high risk of severe damage in the event of a tsunami.

== Economy ==
The principal industry of the Long Beach Peninsula has become tourism, though fishing, crabbing, oyster farming, and cranberry farming are also important components of the local economy. The Long Beach Peninsula is located on the west side of the Willapa Bay, considered the number one producer of farmed oysters in the United States and among the top five producers worldwide.

The Long Beach Peninsula has become one of the most popular tourism destinations in the State of Washington, and has attracted visitors from all over North America. As one of the final destinations of the Lewis and Clark Expedition, several television specials have brought publicity to this area. A multitude of events and festivals are held throughout the year including the Washington State International Kite Festival, the Sandsations sandcastle sculpting competition, and the annual The Rod Run to the End of the World, which attracts thousands of visitors on the weekend following Labor Day.

== History ==
The Long Beach Peninsula was the site of the unique steam Ilwaco Railway, which served local peninsula industries and tourism from the 1880s to the 1920s, and was notable for having no connection with other railroads, being linked only by outside steamboat connections at the Ilwaco dock.

== Cities and towns ==
- Ilwaco
- Long Beach
- Nahcotta
- Ocean Park
- Oysterville
- Seaview
